= 1966–67 Spartan League =

Spartan League
- Season: 1966–67

The 1966–67 Spartan League season was the 49th in the history of Spartan League. The league consisted of 17 teams.

== League table ==
Spartan League
- Season: 1966–67
- Champions: Hampton
- Promoted: None
- Relegated: None

The division featured 17 teams, 16 from last season and 1 new team:

- Berkhamsted, from Athenian League Division Two

Pos	Team	Pld	W	D	L	GF	GA	GR	Pts	Promotion or relegation
1	Hampton (C)	32	25	4	3	100	23	4.348	54	
2	Addlestone	32	23	4	5	92	34	2.706	50	
3	Vauxhall Motors	32	21	5	6	72	41	1.756	47	
4	Hoddesdon Town	32	18	7	7	67	34	1.971	43	
5	Tring Town	32	16	7	9	76	49	1.551	39	
6	Banstead Athletic	32	15	7	10	65	47	1.383	37	
7	Chalfont St. Peter	32	14	5	13	58	60	0.967	33	
8	Kingsbury Town	32	12	7	13	57	70	0.814	31	
9	Huntley & Palmers	32	10	10	12	44	52	0.846	30	
10	Rayners Lane	32	12	5	15	60	57	1.053	29	
11	Crown and Manor	32	12	5	15	47	64	0.734	29	
12	Staines Town	32	12	4	16	60	70	0.857	28	
13	Leavesden Hospital	32	11	4	17	47	62	0.758	26	Joined Herts County League
14	Molesey	32	9	7	16	50	63	0.794	25	
15	Petters Sports	32	6	6	20	40	88	0.455	18	
16	Berkhamsted	32	5	5	22	35	84	0.417	15	
17	Wood Green Town	32	3	4	25	36	108	0.333	10	Joined North Suburban League

Rules for classification: 1) points; 2) goal ratio.
(C) Champions
