= 1970–71 Spartan League =

Spartan League
- Season: 1970–71

The 1970–71 Spartan League season was the 53rd in the history of Spartan League. The league consisted of 18 teams.

== League table ==
Spartan League
- Season: 1970–71
- Champions: Hoddesdon Town
- Promoted: Staines Town; Hampton; Addlestone
- Relegated: None

The division featured 18 teams, 17 from last season and 1 new team:

- Bracknell Town, from Surrey Senior League

Pos	Team	Pld	W	D	L	GF	GA	GR	Pts	Promotion or relegation
1	Hoddesdon Town (C)	34	26	3	5	101	26	3.885	55	
2	Staines Town (P)	34	22	8	4	85	27	3.148	52	Promotion to Athenian League Division Two
3	Hampton (P)	34	22	7	5	88	32	2.750	51	Promotion to Athenian League Division Two
4	Addlestone (P)	34	20	10	4	88	37	2.378	50	Promotion to Athenian League Division Two
5	Vauxhall Motors	34	18	8	8	71	43	1.651	44	
6	Leighton Town	34	16	10	8	66	35	1.886	42	
7	Egham Town	34	17	5	12	61	46	1.326	39	
8	Bracknell Town	34	16	5	13	51	65	0.785	37	
9	Banstead Athletic	34	13	5	16	61	69	0.884	31	
10	Kingsbury Town	34	11	8	15	47	43	1.093	30	
11	Molesey	34	12	5	17	48	68	0.706	29	
12	Tring Town	34	12	5	17	38	79	0.481	29	
13	Berkhamsted Town	34	11	6	17	44	65	0.677	28	
14	Crown and Manor	34	7	10	17	27	56	0.482	24	
15	Chertsey Town	34	9	5	20	38	58	0.655	23	
16	Chalfont St. Peter	34	7	6	21	31	64	0.484	20	
17	Feltham	34	6	8	20	32	70	0.457	20	
18	Huntley & Palmers	34	1	6	27	20	114	0.175	8	Left the league

Rules for classification: 1) points; 2) goal ratio.
(C) Champions; (P) Promoted
