= 1969–70 Spartan League =

Spartan League
- Season: 1969–70

The 1969–70 Spartan League season was the 52nd in the history of Spartan League. The league consisted of 18 teams.

== League table ==
Spartan League
- Season: 1969–70
- Champions: Hampton
- Promoted: None
- Relegated: None

The division featured 18 teams, all from last season.

Pos	Team	Pld	W	D	L	GF	GA	GR	Pts	Promotion or relegation
1	Hampton (C)	34	25	6	3	82	21	3.905	56	
2	Addlestone	34	24	6	4	71	24	2.958	54	
3	Leighton Town	34	19	5	10	54	30	1.800	43	
4	Staines Town	34	18	7	9	67	45	1.489	43	
5	Vauxhall Motors	34	19	4	11	61	43	1.419	42	
6	Hoddesdon Town	34	15	10	9	57	36	1.583	40	
7	Banstead Athletic	34	17	6	11	57	44	1.295	40	
8	Berkhamsted Town	34	14	8	12	41	41	1.000	36	
9	Kingsbury Town	34	15	5	14	42	36	1.167	35	
10	Tring Town	34	14	7	13	51	56	0.911	35	
11	Chertsey Town	34	14	5	15	59	59	1.000	33	
12	Crown and Manor	34	10	9	15	36	51	0.706	29	
13	Molesey	34	8	12	14	38	52	0.731	28	
14	Feltham	34	8	8	18	41	55	0.745	24	
15	Chalfont St. Peter	34	7	9	18	35	80	0.438	23	
16	Egham Town	34	6	8	20	31	55	0.564	20	
17	Rayners Lane	34	5	9	20	30	73	0.411	19	Left the league
18	Huntley & Palmers	34	3	6	25	36	88	0.409	12	

Rules for classification: 1) points; 2) goal ratio.
(C) Champions
