= 1971–72 Spartan League =

Spartan League
- Season: 1971–72

The 1971–72 Spartan League season was the 54th in the history of Spartan League. The league consisted of 16 teams.

== League table ==
Spartan League
- Season: 1971–72
- Champions: Egham Town
- Promoted: None
- Relegated: None

The division featured 16 teams, 14 from last season and 2 new teams:

- Farnham Town, from Surrey Senior League
- Harefield United, from Middlesex League

| Pos | Team | Pld | W | D | L | GF | GA | GR | Pts |
|---|---|---|---|---|---|---|---|---|---|
| 1 | Egham Town (C) | 30 | 22 | 4 | 4 | 59 | 19 | 3.105 | 48 |
| 2 | Hoddesdon Town | 30 | 18 | 9 | 3 | 63 | 15 | 4.200 | 45 |
| 3 | Molesey | 30 | 15 | 11 | 4 | 40 | 23 | 1.739 | 41 |
| 4 | Vauxhall Motors | 30 | 17 | 5 | 8 | 61 | 29 | 2.103 | 39 |
| 5 | Bracknell Town | 30 | 14 | 10 | 6 | 58 | 34 | 1.706 | 38 |
| 6 | Kingsbury Town | 30 | 12 | 10 | 8 | 48 | 34 | 1.412 | 34 |
| 7 | Farnham Town | 30 | 12 | 8 | 10 | 51 | 58 | 0.879 | 32 |
| 8 | Feltham | 30 | 11 | 7 | 12 | 46 | 46 | 1.000 | 29 |
| 9 | Harefield United | 30 | 11 | 7 | 12 | 36 | 39 | 0.923 | 29 |
| 10 | Berkhamsted Town | 30 | 10 | 5 | 15 | 41 | 58 | 0.707 | 25 |
| 11 | Chalfont St. Peter | 30 | 8 | 9 | 13 | 29 | 40 | 0.725 | 25 |
| 12 | Chertsey Town | 30 | 8 | 8 | 14 | 44 | 53 | 0.830 | 24 |
| 13 | Leighton Town | 30 | 9 | 5 | 16 | 39 | 61 | 0.639 | 23 |
| 14 | Banstead Athletic | 30 | 8 | 3 | 19 | 33 | 72 | 0.458 | 19 |
| 15 | Tring Town | 30 | 6 | 5 | 19 | 32 | 65 | 0.492 | 17 |
| 16 | Crown and Manor | 30 | 2 | 8 | 20 | 22 | 56 | 0.393 | 12 |

Rules for classification: 1) points; 2) goal ratio.
(C) Champions
