= 1965–66 Spartan League =

Spartan League
- Season: 1965–66

The 1965–66 Spartan League season was the 48th in the history of Spartan League. The league consisted of 18 teams.

== League table ==
Spartan League
- Season: 1965–66
- Champions: Hampton
- Promoted: Boreham Wood
- Relegated: None

The division featured 18 teams, 16 from last season and 2 new teams:

- Banstead Athletic, from Surrey Senior League
- Leavesden Hospital, from Herts County League

Pos	Team	Pld	W	D	L	GF	GA	GR	Pts	Promotion or relegation
1	Hampton (C)	34	29	2	3	123	31	3.968	60	
2	Boreham Wood (P)	34	25	5	4	101	34	2.971	55	Promotion to Athenian League Division Two
3	Vauxhall Motors	34	22	5	7	78	30	2.600	49	
4	Willesden	34	19	7	8	71	39	1.821	45	Joined Greater London League
5	Molesey	34	19	5	10	76	53	1.434	43	
6	Banstead Athletic	34	17	8	9	67	55	1.218	42	
7	Staines Town	34	16	9	9	77	81	0.951	41	
8	Leavesden Hospital	34	15	7	12	71	68	1.044	37	
9	Chalfont St. Peter	34	15	6	13	61	51	1.196	36	
10	Hoddesdon Town	34	13	5	16	65	65	1.000	31	
11	Tring Town	34	12	5	17	53	62	0.855	29	
12	Kingsbury Town	34	9	9	16	60	69	0.870	27	
13	Rayners Lane	34	9	7	18	49	77	0.636	25	
14	Crown and Manor	34	7	7	20	46	86	0.535	21	
15	Huntley & Palmers	34	8	4	22	51	83	0.614	20	
16	Addlestone	34	8	4	22	55	97	0.567	20	
17	Petters Sports	34	7	5	22	51	105	0.486	19	
18	Wood Green Town	34	3	6	25	40	109	0.367	12	

Rules for classification: 1) points; 2) goal ratio.
(C) Champions; (P) Promoted
