= 1967–68 Spartan League =

Spartan League
- Season: 1967–68

The 1967–68 Spartan League season was the 50th in the history of Spartan League. The league consisted of 18 teams.

== League table ==
Spartan League
- Season: 1967–68
- Champions: Tring Town
- Promoted: None
- Relegated: None

The division featured 18 teams, 15 from last season and 3 new teams:

- Leighton Town, from South Midlands League
- Egham Town, from Surrey Senior League
- Chertsey Town, from Greater London League

Pos	Team	Pld	W	D	L	GF	GA	GR	Pts	Promotion or relegation
1	Tring Town (C)	34	25	7	2	105	40	2.625	57	
2	Hampton	34	26	4	4	108	21	5.143	56	
3	Leighton Town	34	22	4	8	86	37	2.324	48	
4	Addlestone	34	20	7	7	82	32	2.563	47	
5	Vauxhall Motors	34	18	11	5	81	40	2.025	47	
6	Staines Town	34	19	7	8	84	45	1.867	45	
7	Hoddesdon Town	34	18	9	7	70	39	1.795	45	
8	Molesey	34	16	6	12	63	58	1.086	38	
9	Egham Town	34	11	8	15	65	68	0.956	30	
10	Huntley & Palmers	34	11	6	17	44	67	0.657	28	
11	Rayners Lane	34	10	8	16	37	62	0.597	28	
12	Banstead Athletic	34	7	13	14	48	63	0.762	27	
13	Berkhamsted Town	34	8	10	16	37	86	0.430	26	
14	Crown and Manor	34	10	5	19	49	79	0.620	25	
15	Kingsbury Town	34	9	6	19	47	78	0.603	24	
16	Chalfont St. Peter	34	5	8	21	39	83	0.470	18	
17	Chertsey Town	34	4	10	20	45	96	0.469	18	
18	Petters Sports	34	0	5	29	33	129	0.256	5	Left the league

Rules for classification: 1) points; 2) goal ratio.
(C) Champions
