= 1968–69 Spartan League =

Spartan League
- Season: 1968–69

The 1968–69 Spartan League season was the 51st in the history of Spartan League. The league consisted of 18 teams.

== League table ==
Spartan League
- Season: 1968–69
- Champions: Vauxhall Motors
- Promoted: None
- Relegated: None

The division featured 18 teams, 17 from last season and 1 new team:

- Feltham, from Surrey Senior League

Pos	Team	Pld	W	D	L	GF	GA	GR	Pts
1	Vauxhall Motors (C)	34	24	8	2	80	27	2.963	56
2	Tring Town	34	24	6	4	89	24	3.708	54
3	Feltham	34	24	6	4	72	40	1.800	54
4	Hampton	34	19	9	6	74	32	2.313	47
5	Leighton Town	34	21	4	9	68	43	1.581	46
6	Staines Town	34	18	7	9	75	54	1.389	43
7	Addlestone	34	18	5	11	68	40	1.700	41
8	Hoddesdon Town	34	14	6	14	47	42	1.119	34
9	Molesey	34	13	7	14	51	52	0.981	33
10	Chertsey Town	34	11	10	13	58	60	0.967	32
11	Kingsbury Town	34	13	5	16	54	65	0.831	31
12	Egham Town	34	9	10	15	63	74	0.851	28
13	Chalfont St. Peter	34	10	7	17	45	70	0.643	27
14	Rayners Lane	34	10	6	18	49	80	0.613	26
15	Berkhamsted Town	34	6	9	19	51	71	0.718	21
16	Huntley & Palmers	34	8	4	22	49	105	0.467	20
17	Banstead Athletic	34	5	3	26	29	72	0.403	13
18	Crown and Manor	34	1	4	29	31	102	0.304	6

Rules for classification: 1) points; 2) goal ratio.
(C) Champions
