= 1973–74 Spartan League =

Spartan League
- Season: 1973–74

The 1973–74 Spartan League season was the 56th in the history of Spartan League. The league consisted of 18 teams.

== League table ==
Spartan League
- Season: 1973–74
- Champions: Farnborough Town
- Promoted: Egham Town
- Relegated: None

The division featured 18 teams, 16 from last season and 2 new teams:

- Camberley Town, from Surrey Senior League
- Rayners Lane

Pos	Team	Pld	W	D	L	GF	GA	GR	Pts	Promotion or relegation
1	Farnborough Town (C)	34	28	5	1	88	16	5.500	61	
2	Hoddesdon Town	34	24	6	4	92	36	2.556	54	
3	Egham Town (P)	34	24	5	5	80	28	2.857	53	Promotion to Athenian League Division Two
4	Vauxhall Motors	34	19	8	7	71	29	2.448	46	Transferred to the United Counties League Premier Division
5	Banstead Athletic	34	20	5	9	62	41	1.512	45	
6	Bracknell Town	34	15	9	10	64	50	1.280	39	
7	Berkhamsted Town	34	15	9	10	48	39	1.231	39	
8	Leighton Town	34	16	4	14	48	43	1.116	36	Transferred to the United Counties League Premier Division
9	Harefield United	34	15	5	14	49	39	1.256	35	
10	Camberley Town	34	12	9	13	46	59	0.780	33	
11	Rayners Lane	34	10	6	18	50	70	0.714	26	
12	Kingsbury Town	34	9	8	17	41	58	0.707	26	
13	Farnham Town	34	9	7	18	38	73	0.521	25	
14	Crown & Manor	34	7	10	17	38	54	0.704	24	
15	Chertsey Town	34	8	7	19	45	64	0.703	23	
16	Tring Town	34	8	7	19	39	62	0.629	23	
17	Chalfont St. Peter	34	5	10	19	33	67	0.493	20	
18	Amersham Town	34	1	2	31	14	118	0.119	4	

Rules for classification: 1) points; 2) goal ratio.
(C) Champions; (P) Promoted
