= 1962–63 Spartan League =

Spartan League
- Season: 1962–63

The 1962–63 Spartan League season was the 45th in the history of Spartan League. The league consisted of 16 teams.

== League table ==
Spartan League
- Season: 1962–63
- Champions: Cheshunt
- Promoted: None
- Relegated: None

The division featured 16 teams, 14 from last season and 2 new teams:

- Cheshunt, from Aetolian League
- Chalfont St. Peter, from London League

Pos	Team	Pld	W	D	L	GF	GA	GR	Pts
1	Cheshunt (C)	30	27	1	2	122	42	2.905	55
2	Vauxhall Motors	30	18	3	9	94	41	2.293	39
3	Ruislip Manor	30	16	6	8	72	39	1.846	38
4	Tring Town	30	15	7	8	60	48	1.250	37
5	Boreham Wood	30	15	4	11	69	53	1.302	34
6	Chalfont St. Peter	30	14	6	10	69	59	1.169	34
7	Molesey	30	11	8	11	57	66	0.864	30
8	Marlow	30	11	7	12	65	71	0.915	29
9	Petters Sports	30	13	3	14	67	75	0.893	29
10	Staines Town	30	11	6	13	56	60	0.933	28
11	Rayners Lane	30	12	4	14	46	65	0.708	28
12	Wood Green Town	30	8	9	13	52	69	0.754	25
13	Crown and Manor	30	10	5	15	44	59	0.746	25
14	Huntley & Palmers	30	8	5	17	44	75	0.587	21
15	Kingsbury Town	30	5	6	19	42	80	0.525	16
16	Hoddesdon Town	30	4	4	22	38	95	0.400	12

Rules for classification: 1) points; 2) goal ratio.
(C) Champions
