= 1964–65 Spartan League =

Spartan League
- Season: 1964–65

The 1964–65 Spartan League season was the 47th in the history of Spartan League. The league consisted of 18 teams.

== League table ==
Spartan League
- Season: 1964–65
- Champions: Hampton
- Promoted: Marlow; Ruislip Manor
- Relegated: None

The division featured 18 teams, 16 from last season and 2 new teams:

- Hampton, from Surrey Senior League
- Addlestone, from Surrey Senior League

Pos	Team	Pld	W	D	L	GF	GA	GR	Pts	Promotion
1	Hampton (C)	34	25	6	3	87	23	3.783	56	
2	Hoddesdon Town	34	19	11	4	85	40	2.125	49	
3	Vauxhall Motors	34	20	7	7	94	45	2.089	47	
4	Wood Green Town	34	22	2	10	86	52	1.654	46	
5	Staines Town	34	20	6	8	84	55	1.527	46	
6	Willesden	34	17	5	12	61	45	1.356	39	
7	Chalfont St. Peter	34	16	7	11	72	54	1.333	39	
8	Boreham Wood	34	15	9	10	61	56	1.089	39	
9	Addlestone	34	13	8	13	59	63	0.937	34	
10	Tring Town	34	11	11	12	43	58	0.741	33	
11	Crown and Manor	34	13	6	15	47	42	1.119	32	
12	Marlow (P)	34	13	3	18	79	77	1.026	29	Promotion to Athenian League Division Two
13	Kingsbury Town	34	10	7	17	57	88	0.648	27	
14	Molesey	34	9	7	18	42	82	0.512	25	
15	Rayners Lane	34	8	7	19	57	88	0.648	23	
16	Ruislip Manor (P)	34	6	6	22	47	61	0.770	18	Promotion to Athenian League Division Two
17	Huntley & Palmers	34	6	5	23	38	98	0.388	17	
18	Petters Sports	34	4	5	25	34	106	0.321	13	

Rules for classification: 1) points; 2) goal average.
(C) Champions; (P) Promoted
