= 1960–61 Spartan League =

Spartan League
- Season: 1960–61

The 1960–61 Spartan League season was the 43rd in the history of Spartan League. The league consisted of 15 teams.

== League table ==
Spartan League
- Season: 1960–61
- Champions: Vauxhall Motors
- Promoted: None
- Relegated: None

The division featured 15 teams, 12 from last season and 3 new teams:

- Petters Sports, from Surrey Senior League
- Crown and Manor, from Parthenon League
- Kingsbury Town, from Parthenon League

Pos	Team	Pld	W	D	L	GF	GA	GR	Pts	Qualification
1	Vauxhall Motors (C)	28	16	5	7	79	41	1.927	37	
2	Petters Sports	28	15	7	6	69	45	1.533	37	
3	Wolverton Town	28	15	5	8	87	62	1.403	35	Joined United Counties League
4	Marlow	28	14	7	7	60	48	1.250	35	
5	Staines Town	28	14	6	8	67	41	1.634	34	
6	Molesey	28	15	4	9	59	42	1.405	34	
7	Crown and Manor	28	13	6	9	61	50	1.220	32	
8	Tring Town	28	15	2	11	66	61	1.082	32	
9	Wood Green Town	28	12	7	9	57	50	1.140	31	
10	Ruislip Manor	28	10	6	12	62	67	0.925	26	
11	Huntley & Palmers	28	8	3	17	46	70	0.657	19	
12	Hoddesdon Town	28	8	3	17	52	81	0.642	19	
13	Rayners Lane	28	7	4	17	48	77	0.623	18	
14	Boreham Wood	28	5	6	17	40	71	0.563	16	
15	Kingsbury Town	28	6	3	19	39	86	0.453	15	

Rules for classification: 1) points; 2) goal ratio.
(C) Champions
