= 1961–62 Spartan League =

Spartan League
- Season: 1961–62

The 1961–62 Spartan League season was the 44th in the history of Spartan League. The league consisted of 14 teams.

== League table ==
Spartan League
- Season: 1961–62
- Champions: Petters Sports
- Promoted: None
- Relegated: None

The division featured 14 teams, all from last season.

Pos	Team	Pld	W	D	L	GF	GA	GR	Pts
1	Petters Sports (C)	26	17	5	4	65	42	1.548	39
2	Vauxhall Motors	26	17	4	5	71	36	1.972	38
3	Ruislip Manor	26	15	7	4	72	38	1.895	37
4	Marlow	26	14	5	7	64	36	1.778	33
5	Crown and Manor	26	10	7	9	47	43	1.093	27
6	Staines Town	26	11	3	12	51	49	1.041	25
7	Hoddesdon Town	26	9	6	11	46	61	0.754	24
8	Wood Green Town	26	7	9	10	43	57	0.754	23
9	Boreham Wood	26	8	6	12	48	62	0.774	22
10	Tring Town	26	9	3	14	51	48	1.063	21
11	Huntley & Palmers	26	6	8	12	33	44	0.750	20
12	Molesey	26	7	6	13	41	60	0.683	20
13	Kingsbury Town	26	7	6	13	44	70	0.629	20
14	Rayners Lane	26	3	9	14	42	72	0.583	15

Rules for classification: 1) points; 2) goal ratio.
(C) Champions
