= 2005–06 FA Cup qualifying rounds =

Tournament details
- Country: England; Wales

The 2005–06 FA Cup qualifying rounds opened the 125th season of competition in England for 'The Football Association Challenge Cup' (FA Cup), the world's oldest association football single knockout competition. A total of 674 clubs were accepted for the competition, up 13 from the previous season's 661.

The large number of clubs entering the tournament from lower down (Levels 5 through 11) in the English football pyramid meant that the competition started with six rounds of preliminary (2) and qualifying (4) knockouts for these non-League teams. South Western Football League was the only level 11 league represented in the Cup, seven clubs from the South Western Football League were the lowest-ranked clubs in competition. The 32 winning teams from Fourth qualifying round progressed to the First round proper, where League teams tiered at Levels 3 and 4 entered the competition.

== Calendar ==
| Round | Start date | Leagues entering at this round | New entries this round | Winners from previous round | Number of fixtures | Prize money |
|---|---|---|---|---|---|---|
| Extra preliminary round | 20 August 2005 | Levels 9-11 | 172 | none | 86 | £500 |
| Preliminary round | 27 August 2005 | Level 8 | 278 | 86 | 182 | £1,000 |
| First qualifying round | 10 September 2005 | Level 7 | 66 | 182 | 124 | £2,250 |
| Second qualifying round | 24 September 2005 | Conference North; Conference South | 44 | 124 | 84 | £3,750 |
| Third qualifying round | 8 October 2005 | none | none | 84 | 42 | £5,000 |
| Fourth qualifying round | 22 October 2005 | Conference Premier | 22 | 42 | 32 | £10,000 |

== Extra preliminary round ==
Matches played on Friday/Saturday/Sunday 19 to 21 August 2005. 172 clubs from Level 9, Level 10 and Level 11 of English football, entered at this stage of the competition, while other 189 clubs from levels 9-11 get a bye to the preliminary round.

| Tie | Home team (tier) | Score | Away team (tier) | Att. |
| 1 | Newcastle Benfield (Bay Plastics) (9) | 2–4 | Bedlington Terriers (9) | 153 |
| 2 | Bacup Borough (9) | 0–5 | Pickering Town (9) | 60 |
| 3 | Jarrow Roofing BCA (9) | 0–4 | Sheffield (9) | 66 |
| 4 | Blackpool Mechanics (10) | 1–2 | Newcastle Blue Star (9) | 80 |
| 5 | Nelson (10) | 2–4 | Retford United (10) | 106 |
| 6 | Esh Winning (9) | 4–4 | Ashington (9) | 59 |
| replay | Ashington (9) | 4–1 | Esh Winning (9) | 165 |
| 7 | Prudhoe Town (10) | 1–3 | Horden Colliery Welfare (9) | 32 |
| 8 | Skelmersdale United (9) | 1–0 | Liversedge (9) | 132 |
| 9 | Curzon Ashton (9) | 2–1 | Darwen (10) | 194 |
| 10 | Oldham Town (10) | 1–0 | Morpeth Town (9) | 65 |
| 11 | Guisborough Town (10) | 1–1 | Great Harwood Town (10) | 77 |
| replay | Great Harwood Town (10) | 3–3 (4–2 p) | Guisborough Town (10) | 92 |
| 12 | Cheadle Town (10) | 3–1 | Abbey Hey (9) | 61 |
| 13 | Brandon United (9) | 0–5 | Billingham Synthonia (9) | 71 |
| 14 | Tow Law Town (9) | 2–0 | Squires Gate (9) | 115 |
| 15 | Formby (9) | 1–1 | Consett (9) | 70 |
| replay | Consett (9) | 5–1 | Formby (9) | 97 |
| 16 | Winsford United (10) | 1–1 | Alsager Town (9) | 99 |
| replay | Alsager Town (9) | 0–1 | Winsford United (10) | 120 |
| 17 | Flixton (10) | 1–2 | Hebburn Town (10) | 64 |
| 18 | Rossington Main (10) | 1–1 | Garforth Town (9) | 79 |
| replay | Garforth Town (9) | 3–0 | Rossington Main (10) | 88 |
| 19 | Cammell Laird (9) | 4–1 | West Allotment Celtic (9) | 130 |
| 20 | West Auckland Town (9) | 2–1 | Shildon (9) | 125 |
| 21 | Winterton Rangers (10) | 1–0 | North Shields (10) | 56 |
| 22 | Studley (9) | 1–3 | Oadby Town (9) | 79 |
| 23 | Sutton Town (9) | 5–1 | Loughborough Dynamo (9) | 108 |
| 24 | Stourbridge (9) | 3–0 | Glossop North End (9) | 211 |
| 25 | Borrowash Victoria (10) | 1–1 | Ford Sports Daventry (9) | 79 |
| replay | Ford Sports Daventry (9) | 1–2 | Borrowash Victoria (10) | 50 |
| 26 | Long Eaton United (9) | 2–1 | Quorn (9) | 93 |
| 27 | Congleton Town (9) | 2–0 | Romulus (9) | 148 |
| 28 | Norton United (10) | 1–0 | Alvechurch (9) | 60 |
| 29 | Shirebrook Town (9) | 2–3 | Teversal (10) | 183 |
| 30 | Oldbury United (9) | 2–1 | Racing Club Warwick (9) | 72 |
| 31 | Witham Town (9) | 1–0 | Hadleigh United (10) | 51 |
| 32 | Hullbridge Sports (9) | 2–5 | Wisbech Town (9) | 70 |
| 33 | Chalfont St Peter (9) | 1–0 | Buckingham Town (9) | 67 |
| 34 | Brook House (9) | 1–1 | Leiston (9) | 77 |
| replay | Leiston (9) | 1–3 | Brook House (9) | 122 |
| 35 | Wembley (9) | 0–2 | St Neots Town (9) | 87 |
| 36 | Aylesbury Vale (9) | 2–2 | Kirkley (9) | 105 |
| replay | Kirkley (9) | 0–3 | Aylesbury Vale (9) | 191 |
| 37 | Ware (9) | 2–0 | Sporting Bengal United (9) | 207 |
| 38 | Concord Rangers (9) | 0–1 | Kingsbury Town (9) | 53 |
| 39 | Harpenden Town (9) | 2–1 | Sawbridgeworth Town (9) | 61 |
| 40 | Soham Town Rangers (9) | 2–1 | Yaxley (9) | 151 |
| 41 | Stanway Rovers (10) | 4–1 | Norwich United (9) | 80 |
| 42 | Fakenham Town (10) | 2–0 | Long Buckby (9) | 86 |
| 43 | Gorleston (10) | 2–4 | North Greenford United (9) | 84 |

| Tie | Home team (tier) | Score | Away team (tier) | Att. |
| 44 | Haringey Borough (9) | 0–3 | Felixstowe & Walton United (10) | 73 |
| 45 | Bowers & Pitsea (9) | 2–2 | Stotfold (9) | 68 |
| replay | Stotfold (9) | 3–3 (4–2 p) | Bowers & Pitsea (9) | 95 |
| 46 | London APSA (9) | 0–2 | Halstead Town (9) | 94 |
| 47 | Broxbourne Borough V & E (9) | 1–4 | Holmer Green (9) | 28 |
| 48 | Eton Manor (9) | 0–1 | Leverstock Green (9) | 35 |
| 49 | St Margaretsbury (9) | 2–1 | St Ives Town (9) | 60 |
| 50 | Wootton Blue Cross (9) | 2–0 | Desborough Town (9) | 67 |
| 51 | Romford (9) | 1–3 | Waltham Abbey (9) | 107 |
| 52 | Biggleswade United (9) | 6–0 | Haverhill Rovers (10) | 86 |
| 53 | Harefield United (9) | 2–3 | Langford (9) | 33 |
| 54 | Southend Manor (9) | 0–1 | Woodford United (9) | 34 |
| 55 | Woodbridge Town (9) | 3–3 | Lowestoft Town (9) | 121 |
| replay | Lowestoft Town (9) | 5–0 | Woodbridge Town (9) | 238 |
| 56 | Saffron Walden Town (10) | 1–1 | Flackwell Heath (9) | 102 |
| replay | Flackwell Heath (9) | 3–1 | Saffron Walden Town (10) | 82 |
| 57 | Erith Town (9) | 0–3 | Hassocks (9) | 46 |
| 58 | Thamesmead Town (9) | 2–4 | Abingdon United (9) | 38 |
| 59 | Saltdean United (10) | 0–0 | Wantage Town (9) | 47 |
| replay | Wantage Town (9) | 0–2 | Saltdean United (10) | 86 |
| 60 | AFC Totton (9) | 5–0 | Milton United (9) | 80 |
| 61 | Eastbourne United Association (9) | 1–2 | Ash United (9) | 68 |
| 62 | Hythe Town (9) | 4–1 | Raynes Park Vale (9) | 116 |
| 63 | Moneyfields (9) | 6–1 | Abingdon Town (9) | 67 |
| 64 | Fareham Town (9) | 0–0 | Selsey (10) | 90 |
| replay | Selsey (10) | 3–2 | Fareham Town (9) | 250 |
| 65 | Gosport Borough (9) | 6–1 | Sandhurst Town (9) | 138 |
| 66 | East Grinstead Town (10) | 0–7 | VCD Athletic (9) | 73 |
| 67 | AFC Newbury (9) | 2–2 | Farnham Town (9) | 95 |
| replay | Farnham Town (9) | 2–3 | AFC Newbury (9) | 90 |
| 68 | Erith & Belvedere (9) | 4–2 | Hamble ASSC (9) | 99 |
| 69 | Lancing (10) | 1–2 | Whitehawk (9) | 95 |
| 70 | Westfield (9) | 1–2 | Godalming Town (9) | 61 |
| 71 | Chichester City United (9) | 1–2 | East Preston (9) | 48 |
| 72 | Sidley United (9) | 3–1 | Pagham (10) | 205 |
| 73 | Sevenoaks Town (9) | 4–2 | Chertsey Town (9) | 133 |
| 74 | Andover (9) | 4–4 | Didcot Town (9) | 190 |
| replay | Didcot Town (9) | 2–0 | Andover (9) | 292 |
| 75 | Hungerford Town (9) | 0–4 | North Leigh (9) | 71 |
| 76 | Horsham YMCA (9) | 1–0 | Hailsham Town (9) | 80 |
| 77 | Three Bridges (9) | 2–0 | Shoreham (9) | 55 |
| 78 | Westbury United (10) | 2–1 | Newquay (11) | 78 |
| 79 | Willand Rovers (9) | 0–1 | Hamworthy United (9) | 167 |
| 80 | Tuffley Rovers (9) | 0–0 | Elmore (10) | 45 |
| replay | Elmore (10) | 1–0 | Tuffley Rovers (9) | 74 |
| 81 | Bishop's Cleeve (9) | 1–0 | Corsham Town (9) | 124 |
| 82 | Hallen (9) | 3–0 | Porthleven (11) | 78 |
| 83 | Calne Town (9) | 0–2 | Shortwood United (9) | 56 |
| 84 | Minehead Town (10) | 1–2 | Almondsbury Town (9) | 49 |
| 85 | Slimbridge (9) | 0–1 | Wimborne Town (9) | 131 |
| 86 | Odd Down (9) | 2–0 | Portland United (9) | 50 |

== Preliminary round ==
Matches played on weekend of Saturday 27 August 2005. A total of 364 clubs took part in this stage of the competition, including the 86 winners from the extra preliminary round, 189 clubs from Levels 9–11, who get a bye in the extra preliminary round and 89 entering at this stage from the four divisions at Level 8 of English football. The round featured five clubs from Level 11 (all from the South Western Football League) still in the competition, being the lowest ranked clubs in this round.

| Tie | Home team (tier) | Score | Away team (tier) | Att. |
| 1 | Bridlington Town (8) | 2–2 | Whitley Bay (9) | 180 |
| replay | Whitley Bay (9) | 4–0 | Bridlington Town (8) | 189 |
| 2 | Tow Law Town (9) | 1–3 | Padiham (10) | 112 |
| 3 | Colne (9) | 1–2 | Chadderton (10) | 111 |
| 4 | Warrington Town (8) | 2–2 | Penrith (10) | 84 |
| replay | Penrith (10) | 1–2 | Warrington Town (8) | 118 |
| 5 | Ramsbottom United (9) | 3–1 | Marske United (10) | 169 |
| 6 | Thornaby (9) | 3–0 | Peterlee Newtown (10) | 59 |
| 7 | Hebburn Town (10) | 1–1 | Winterton Rangers (10) | 143 |
| replay | Winterton Rangers (10) | 0–2 | Hebburn Town (10) | 102 |
| 8 | Cheadle Town (10) | 2–1 | Bamber Bridge (8) | 71 |
| 9 | Pontefract Collieries (10) | 2–3 | Bishop Auckland (8) | 62 |
| 10 | Eccleshill United (9) | 1–2 | Chester-le-Street Town (9) | 36 |
| 11 | Selby Town (9) | 1–3 | Billingham Town (9) | 150 |
| 12 | Skelmersdale United (9) | 2–0 | Colwyn Bay (8) | 219 |
| 13 | Crook Town (10) | 0–3 | St Helens Town (9) | 125 |
| 14 | Curzon Ashton (9) | 1–0 | Garforth Town (9) | 140 |
| 15 | Rossendale United (8) | 1–1 | Sunderland Nissan (9) | 76 |
| replay | Sunderland Nissan (9) | 1–4 | Rossendale United (8) | 58 |
| 16 | Norton & Stockton Ancients (10) | 0–4 | Great Harwood Town (10) | 93 |
| 17 | Spennymoor Town (10) | 0–2 | Consett (9) | 284 |
| 18 | Durham City (9) | 5–0 | Brodsworth Miners Welfare (9) | 129 |
| 19 | Seaham Red Star (10) | 2–0 | Atherton Collieries (9) | 62 |
| 20 | Cammell Laird (9) | 6–0 | Alnwick Town (10) | 115 |
| 21 | Brigg Town (8) | 4–0 | Holker Old Boys (10) | 123 |
| 22 | Retford United (10) | 4–3 | Parkgate (10) | 197 |
| 23 | Horden Colliery Welfare (9) | 1–2 | Kendal Town (8) | 79 |
| 24 | Tadcaster Albion (10) | 2–2 | Chorley (8) | 110 |
| replay | Chorley (8) | 2–0 | Tadcaster Albion (10) | 176 |
| 25 | Oldham Town (10) | 2–0 | Hall Road Rangers (10) | 75 |
| 26 | Pickering Town (9) | 2–2 | Ashington (9) | 228 |
| replay | Ashington (9) | 1–2 | Pickering Town (9) | 282 |
| 27 | Washington (10) | 0–0 | Stocksbridge Park Steels (8) | 94 |
| replay | Stocksbridge Park Steels (8) | 1–1 (4–2 p) | Washington (10) | |
| 28 | Thackley (9) | 2–0 | South Shields (10) | 57 |
| 29 | Newcastle Blue Star (9) | 2–0 | Hallam (9) | 62 |
| 30 | Sheffield (9) | 2–2 | Mossley (8) | 229 |
| replay | Mossley (8) | 1–0 | Sheffield (9) | 268 |
| 31 | Yorkshire Amateur (10) | 2–1 | Bedlington Terriers (9) | 75 |
| 32 | Glasshoughton Welfare (9) | 0–2 | Woodley Sports (8) | 45 |
| 33 | Maine Road (9) | 0–2 | Armthorpe Welfare (9) | 40 |
| 34 | Billingham Synthonia (9) | 2–0 | Fleetwood Town (8) | 128 |
| 35 | Ossett Albion (8) | 0–3 | Dunston Federation Brewery (9) | 103 |
| 36 | Atherton Laburnum Rovers (9) | 1–1 | Goole (8) | 86 |
| replay | Goole (8) | 2–0 | Atherton Laburnum Rovers (9) | 193 |
| 37 | Whickham (10) | 1–5 | West Auckland Town (9) | 92 |
| 38 | Harrogate Railway Athletic (9) | 1–2 | Clitheroe (8) | 138 |
| 39 | New Mills (10) | 0–2 | Salford City (9) | 206 |
| 40 | Trafford (9) | 3–1 | Silsden (9) | 159 |
| 41 | Northallerton Town (10) | 4–0 | Winsford United (10) | 103 |
Abandoned 80 minutes, result stands
| 42 | Willenhall Town (8) | 1–0 | Blackstones (9) | 104 |
| 43 | Shepshed Dynamo (8) | 4–1 | Carlton Town (10) | 96 |
| 44 | Newcastle Town (9) | 1–1 | Buxton (9) | 211 |
| replay | Buxton (9) | 1–2 | Newcastle Town (9) | 376 |
| 45 | Chasetown (9) | 2–0 | Causeway United (9) | 111 |
| 46 | Congleton Town (9) | 1–2 | Corby Town (8) | 164 |
| 47 | Solihull Borough (8) | 2–0 | Eccleshall (10) | 115 |
| 48 | Westfields (9) | 3–0 | Sutton Coldfield Town (8) | 56 |
| 49 | Rushall Olympic (8) | 0–2 | Gedling Town (10) | 78 |
| 50 | Bromsgrove Rovers (8) | 4–1 | Bourne Town (9) | 304 |
| 51 | Glapwell (9) | 3–1 | Barwell (9) | 46 |
| 52 | Spalding United (8) | 0–1 | Staveley Miners Welfare (10) | 121 |
| 53 | Nantwich Town (9) | 3–1 | Gresley Rovers (8) | 131 |
| 54 | Long Eaton United (9) | 4–2 | Boston Town (9) | 64 |
| 55 | Coalville Town (9) | 3–0 | Borrowash Victoria (10) | 117 |
| 56 | Deeping Rangers (9) | 0–0 | Norton United (10) | 77 |
| replay | Norton United (10) | 1–0 | Deeping Rangers (9) | 66 |
| 57 | Stourport Swifts (8) | 1–2 | Stratford Town (9) | 73 |
| 58 | Oldbury United (9) | 4–0 | Stone Dominoes (9) | 62 |
| 59 | Bedworth United (8) | 3–1 | Rocester (9) | 107 |
| 60 | Oadby Town (9) | 3–3 | Stamford (8) | 175 |
| replay | Stamford (8) | 0–1 | Oadby Town (9) | 202 |
| 61 | Malvern Town (9) | 4–3 | Mickleover Sports (9) | 136 |
| 62 | Cradley Town (9) | 2–1 | Biddulph Victoria (9) | 41 |
| 63 | Holbeach United (9) | 0–2 | Boldmere St Michaels (9) | 68 |
| 64 | Teversal (10) | 1–1 | Pegasus Juniors (9) | 78 |
| replay | Pegasus Juniors (9) | 3–2 | Teversal (10) | 179 |
| 65 | Leamington (9) | 0–0 | Sutton Town (9) | 538 |
| replay | Sutton Town (9) | 2–2 (8–9 p) | Leamington (9) | 205 |
| 66 | Lincoln Moorlands (10) | 0–0 | Eastwood Town (8) | 74 |
| replay | Eastwood Town (8) | 3–2 | Lincoln Moorlands (10) | 116 |
| 67 | Belper Town (8) | 1–0 | Leek CSOB (10) | 148 |
| 68 | South Normanton Athletic (10) | 1–0 | Arnold Town (9) | 84 |
| 69 | Stourbridge (9) | 2–2 | Kidsgrove Athletic (8) | 218 |
| replay | Kidsgrove Athletic (8) | 5–2 | Stourbridge (9) | 110 |
| 70 | Ilford (8) | 0–2 | Brackley Town (8) | 68 |
| 71 | Long Melford (10) | 0–1 | AFC Sudbury (9) | 448 |
| 72 | Wootton Blue Cross (9) | 1–1 | Barton Rovers (8) | 79 |
| replay | Barton Rovers (8) | 4–1 | Wootton Blue Cross (9) | 144 |
| 73 | Ware (9) | 2–4 | Northampton Spencer (9) | 83 |
| 74 | AFC Hornchurch | 0–0 | Chalfont St Peter (9) | 320 |
| replay | Chalfont St Peter (9) | 1–2 | AFC Hornchurch | 104 |
| 75 | Barkingside (9) | 2–2 | Leverstock Green (9) | 119 |
| replay | Leverstock Green (9) | 3–4 | Barkingside (9) | 74 |
| 76 | Harlow Town (8) | 4–2 | Newport Pagnell Town (9) | 119 |
| 77 | Uxbridge (8) | 2–3 | Great Wakering Rovers (8) | 93 |
| 78 | Tiptree United (10) | 2–3 | Potton United (9) | 91 |
| 79 | Bury Town (9) | 1–1 | Ely City (10) | 155 |
| replay | Ely City (10) | 0–8 | Bury Town (9) | 218 |
| 80 | Needham Market (9) | 2–5 | Diss Town (9) | 191 |
| 81 | Marlow (8) | 2–3 | Arlesey Town (8) | 88 |
| 82 | Welwyn Garden City (9) | 2–0 | Aylesbury Vale (9) | 76 |
| 83 | St Neots Town (9) | 1–4 | Hemel Hempstead Town (8) | 145 |
| 84 | Harwich & Parkeston (9) | 2–2 | Holmer Green (9) | 114 |
| replay | Holmer Green (9) | 2–5 | Harwich & Parkeston (9) | 104 |
| 85 | Aveley (8) | 5–1 | Kingsbury Town (9) | 53 |
| 86 | Thame United (8) | 0–1 | Brentwood Town (9) | 49 |
| 87 | Fakenham Town (10) | 1–4 | Waltham Forest (8) | 97 |
| 88 | Berkhamsted Town (8) | 2–0 | Newmarket Town (9) | 131 |
| 89 | Mildenhall Town (9) | 3–1 | Potters Bar Town (8) | 140 |
| 90 | Stotfold (9) | 1–2 | Clapton (9) | 70 |
| 91 | Barking & East Ham United (8) | 1–1 | St Margaretsbury (9) | 85 |
| replay | St Margaretsbury (9) | 2–0 | Barking & East Ham United (8) | 94 |

| Tie | Home team (tier) | Score | Away team (tier) | Att. |
| 92 | Leighton Town (8) | 1–1 | Wroxham (9) | 113 |
| replay | Wroxham (9) | 4–1 | Leighton Town (8) | 132 |
| 93 | Soham Town Rangers (9) | 1–2 | Enfield Town (8) | 254 |
| 94 | Cogenhoe United (9) | 4–1 | Hanwell Town (9) | 78 |
| 95 | March Town United (10) | 4–1 | Harpenden Town (9) | 108 |
| 96 | Stowmarket Town (10) | 2–2 | Ipswich Wanderers (9) | 129 |
| replay | Ipswich Wanderers (9) | 3–1 | Stowmarket Town (10) | 169 |
| 97 | Oxhey Jets (9) | 1–2 | Lowestoft Town (9) | 139 |
| 98 | Royston Town (9) | 1–2 | Clacton Town (9) | 93 |
| 99 | Burnham Ramblers (9) | 4–3 | Flackwell Heath (9) | 56 |
| 100 | Southall (9) | 5–0 | Enfield (8) | 46 |
| 101 | Felixstowe & Walton United (10) | 1–2 | Dunstable Town (8) | 123 |
| 102 | Tilbury (9) | 0–3 | Wivenhoe Town (8) | 58 |
| 103 | London Colney (9) | 2–3 | Rothwell Town (8) | 50 |
| 104 | Raunds Town (9) | 0–2 | Beaconsfield SYCOB (8) | 65 |
| 105 | Woodford United (9) | 1–0 | Wisbech Town (9) | 92 |
| 106 | Boreham Wood (8) | 3–0 | Dereham Town (9) | 115 |
| 107 | Great Yarmouth Town (10) | 2–3 | Stanway Rovers (10) | 100 |
| 108 | Henley Town (9) | 2–4 | Witham Town (9) | 78 |
| 109 | Tring Athletic (9) | 1–2 | Biggleswade United (9) | 140 |
| 110 | North Greenford United (9) | 1–6 | Brook House (9) | 64 |
| 111 | Waltham Abbey (9) | 6–2 | Wingate & Finchley (8) | 58 |
| 112 | Stansted (9) | 2–1 | Langford (9) | 70 |
| 113 | Hertford Town (9) | 1–2 | Ruislip Manor (9) | 85 |
| 114 | Halstead Town (9) | 7–0 | Cornard United (10) | 144 |
| 115 | Lymington & New Milton (8) | 0–2 | Dover Athletic (8) | 142 |
| 116 | Mile Oak (10) | 1–1 | Camberley Town (9) | 61 |
Mile Oak played ineligible player, walkover victory given to Camberley Town
| 117 | Horsham YMCA (9) | 2–0 | Corinthian-Casuals (8) | 99 |
| 118 | Moneyfields (9) | 4–0 | Rye & Iden United (9) | 105 |
| 119 | Lordswood (9) | 3–2 | Saltdean United (10) | 60 |
| 120 | Carterton (9) | 0–3 | Didcot Town (9) | 107 |
| 121 | Kingstonian (8) | 2–1 | Ringmer Town (9) | 324 |
| 122 | Tonbridge Angels (8) | 3–1 | Horsham (8) | 457 |
| 123 | Ashford Town (Kent) (8) | 3–1 | Slade Green (9) | 169 |
| 124 | Cobham (9) | 0–2 | Egham Town (9) | 55 |
| 125 | Reading Town (9) | 1–3 | Eastbourne Town (9) | 44 |
| 126 | Molesey (8) | 2–4 | Burgess Hill Town (8) | 118 |
| 127 | Bashley (8) | 4–0 | Hythe Town (9) | 106 |
| 128 | Ash United (9) | 1–1 | Leatherhead (8) | 111 |
| replay | Leatherhead (8) | 3–2 | Ash United (9) | 235 |
| 129 | Herne Bay (9) | 3–2 | Sevenoaks Town (9) | 117 |
| 130 | Burnham (8) | 2–0 | Selsey (10) | 49 |
| 131 | Sittingbourne (8) | 2–4 | Chessington & Hook United (9) | 138 |
| 132 | Erith & Belvedere (9) | 1–2 | Tooting & Mitcham United (8) | 215 |
| 133 | Croydon Athletic (8) | 4–2 | Redhill (9) | 76 |
| 134 | Oxford City (9) | 3–2 | Newport (Isle of Wight) (8) | 139 |
| 135 | East Preston (9) | 0–1 | Cowes Sports (9) | 51 |
| 136 | Chatham Town (8) | 2–0 | North Leigh (9) | 154 |
| 137 | Metropolitan Police (8) | 0–0 | Bracknell Town (8) | 81 |
| replay | Bracknell Town (8) | 0–2 | Metropolitan Police (8) | 131 |
| 138 | VCD Athletic (9) | 0–2 | Hastings United (8) | 122 |
| 139 | Croydon (9) | 1–1 | Frimley Green (9) | 56 |
| replay | Frimley Green (9) | 0–2 | Croydon (9) | 68 |
| 140 | Mole Valley Predators (9) | 0–8 | Gosport Borough (9) | 58 |
| 141 | Winchester City (9) | 0–3 | Maidstone United (9) | 452 |
| 142 | Sidlesham (10) | 1–2 | Bedfont (9) | 83 |
| 143 | Thatcham Town (9) | 3–0 | Cove (9) | 80 |
| 144 | Chipstead (9) | 4–2 | Brockenhurst (9) | 72 |
| 145 | Whitstable Town (9) | 3–3 | Fleet Town (8) | 165 |
| replay | Fleet Town (8) | 2–1 | Whitstable Town (9) | 102 |
| 146 | Godalming Town (9) | 1–2 | Dulwich Hamlet (8) | 121 |
| 147 | Ashford Town (Middx) (8) | 3–1 | Whyteleafe (8) | 102 |
| 148 | Merstham (9) | 1–4 | Ramsgate (8) | 85 |
| 149 | Steyning Town (10) | 0–6 | Cray Wanderers (8) | 76 |
| 150 | BAT Sports (9) | 0–3 | Abingdon United (9) | 54 |
| 151 | Dartford (8) | 1–2 | Dorking (9) | 281 |
| 152 | Epsom & Ewell (9) | 6–1 | AFC Newbury (9) | 81 |
| 153 | Hillingdon Borough (9) | 0–0 | Hassocks (9) | 64 |
| replay | Hassocks (9) | 2–1 | Hillingdon Borough (9) | 110 |
| 154 | Banstead Athletic (8) | 1–0 | Alton Town (9) | 37 |
| 155 | Whitehawk (9) | 0–2 | AFC Totton (9) | 80 |
| 156 | Three Bridges (9) | 1–0 | Walton Casuals (8) | 84 |
| 157 | Wick (9) | 1–1 | Arundel (9) | 165 |
| replay | Arundel (9) | 1–2 | Wick (9) | 204 |
| 158 | Littlehampton Town (9) | 1–1 | Tunbridge Wells (9) | 131 |
| replay | Tunbridge Wells (9) | 2–2 (16–15 p) | Littlehampton Town (9) | 122 |
| 159 | Sidley United (9) | 1–1 | Deal Town (9) | 104 |
| replay | Deal Town (9) | 2–1 | Sidley United (9) | 143 |
| 160 | Elmore (10) | 2–0 | Torrington (9) | 43 |
| 161 | Shortwood United (9) | 2–3 | Bodmin Town (11) | 93 |
| 162 | Liskeard Athletic (11) | 2–0 | Brislington (9) | 73 |
| 163 | Melksham Town (9) | 2–2 | Westbury United (10) | 112 |
| replay | Westbury United (10) | 2–3 | Melksham Town (9) | 190 |
| 164 | Hamworthy United (9) | 4–0 | Backwell United (9) | 122 |
| 165 | Frome Town (9) | 0–0 | St Blazey (11) | 211 |
Walkover for St Blazey – Frome Town removed
| 166 | Hallen (9) | 1–3 | Swindon Supermarine (8) | 83 |
| 167 | Almondsbury Town (9) | 3–5 | Cinderford Town (8) | 64 |
| 168 | Penzance (11) | 2–2 | Street (10) | 162 |
| replay | Street (10) | 0–0 (2–4 p) | Penzance (11) | 135 |
| 169 | Bemerton Heath Harlequins (9) | 1–0 | Ilfracombe Town (10) | 64 |
| 170 | Chard Town (10) | 0–0 | Wimborne Town (9) | 93 |
| replay | Wimborne Town (9) | 2–0 | Chard Town (10) | 200 |
| 171 | Shepton Mallet (10) | 0–2 | Bournemouth (9) | 69 |
| 172 | Taunton Town (8) | 1–0 | Bristol Manor Farm (9) | 268 |
| 173 | Highworth Town (9) | 1–0 | Welton Rovers (9) | 88 |
| 174 | Bridgwater Town (9) | 0–1 | Paulton Rovers (8) | 168 |
| 175 | Barnstaple Town (9) | 4–1 | Clevedon United (10) | 130 |
| 176 | Odd Down (9) | 3–2 | Exmouth Town (9) | 28 |
| 177 | Bitton (9) | 2–1 | Dawlish Town (10) | 127 |
| 178 | Witney Town (9) | 0–0 | Clevedon Town (8) | 153 |
| replay | Clevedon Town (8) | 3–2 | Witney Town (9) | 165 |
| 179 | Fairford Town (9) | 0–0 | Devizes Town (9) | 55 |
| replay | Devizes Town (9) | 0–3 | Fairford Town (9) | 85 |
| 180 | Christchurch (9) | 5–0 | Bishop Sutton (9) | 55 |
| 181 | Bishop's Cleeve (9) | 3–1 | Bideford (9) | 114 |
| 182 | Bridport (10) | 0–3 | Falmouth Town (11) | 139 |

== First qualifying round ==
Matches on weekend of Saturday 10 September 2005. A total of 248 clubs took part in this stage of the competition, including the 182 winners from the Preliminary round and 66 entering at this stage from the top division of the three leagues at Level 7 of English football. The round featured five clubs from Level 11 (all from the South Western Football League) still in the competition, being the lowest ranked clubs in this round.

| Tie | Home team (tier) | Score | Away team (tier) | Att. |
| 1 | Oldham Town (10) | 1–2 | Great Harwood Town (10) | 65 |
| 2 | Wakefield-Emley (7) | 1–2 | Blyth Spartans (7) | 162 |
| 3 | Armthorpe Welfare (9) | 3–1 | Mossley (8) | 94 |
| 4 | Goole (8) | 5–3 | Clitheroe (8) | 207 |
| 5 | Billingham Synthonia (9) | 4–2 | Retford United (10) | 106 |
| 6 | Trafford (9) | 4–1 | Yorkshire Amateur (10) | 117 |
| 7 | Kendal Town (8) | 2–3 | Witton Albion (7) | 167 |
| 8 | Durham City (9) | 0–2 | Hebburn Town (10) | 151 |
| 9 | Runcorn FC Halton (7) | 2–3 | Skelmersdale United (9) | 129 |
| 10 | Curzon Ashton (9) | 0–2 | Chester-le-Street Town (9) | 117 |
| 11 | Burscough (7) | 3–2 | Ashton United (7) | 187 |
| 12 | Pickering Town (9) | 1–2 | Farsley Celtic (7) | 146 |
| 13 | Cammell Laird (9) | 2–1 | Radcliffe Borough (7) | 175 |
| 14 | Stocksbridge Park Steels (8) | 1–3 | Ossett Town (7) | 104 |
| 15 | Chorley (8) | 0–0 | Bishop Auckland (8) | 237 |
| replay | Bishop Auckland (8) | 2–1 | Chorley (8) | 140 |
| 16 | Dunston Federation Brewery (9) | 4–1 | Thackley (9) | 140 |
| 17 | Woodley Sports (8) | 2–4 | Prescot Cables (7) | 71 |
| 18 | Seaham Red Star (10) | 0–4 | Consett (9) | 87 |
| 19 | Bradford Park Avenue (7) | 1–1 | Padiham (10) | 198 |
| replay | Padiham (10) | 1–4 | Bradford Park Avenue (7) | 305 |
| 20 | Marine (7) | 4–0 | Cheadle Town (10) | 191 |
| 21 | St Helens Town (9) | 3–3 | Northallerton Town (10) | 81 |
| replay | Northallerton Town (10) | 2–3 | St Helens Town (9) | 134 |
| 22 | Frickley Athletic (7) | 2–0 | Chadderton (10) | 214 |
| 23 | Gateshead (7) | 4–0 | Warrington Town (8) | 235 |
| 24 | Guiseley (7) | 0–1 | Salford City (9) | 192 |
| 25 | Rossendale United (8) | 2–2 | Billingham Town (9) | 107 |
| replay | Billingham Town (9) | 2–3 | Rossendale United (8) | 166 |
| 26 | Thornaby (9) | 4–3 | West Auckland Town (9) | 62 |
| 27 | Newcastle Blue Star (9) | 1–2 | Whitby Town (7) | 208 |
| 28 | North Ferriby United (7) | 3–1 | Brigg Town (8) | 213 |
| 29 | Whitley Bay (9) | 1–2 | Ramsbottom United (9) | 162 |
| 30 | Willenhall Town (8) | 1–1 | Malvern Town (9) | 131 |
| replay | Malvern Town (9) | 1–0 | Willenhall Town (8) | 139 |
| 31 | Bedworth United (8) | 1–1 | Solihull Borough (8) | 141 |
| replay | Solihull Borough (8) | 3–2 | Bedworth United (8) | 173 |
| 32 | Stratford Town (9) | 1–3 | Glapwell (9) | 112 |
| 33 | Bromsgrove Rovers (8) | 2–0 | Newcastle Town (9) | 242 |
| 34 | Ilkeston Town (7) | 1–0 | Coalville Town (9) | 336 |
| 35 | Kidsgrove Athletic (8) | 0–1 | Leamington (9) | 429 |
| 36 | Staveley Miners Welfare (10) | 2–1 | Norton United (10) | 68 |
| 37 | Halesowen Town (7) | 5–3 | South Normanton Athletic (10) | 281 |
| 38 | Leek Town (7) | 7–0 | Long Eaton United (9) | 193 |
| 39 | Westfields (9) | 1–2 | Belper Town (8) | 122 |
| 40 | Oadby Town (9) | 3–3 | Oldbury United (9) | 142 |
| replay | Oldbury United (9) | 0–3 | Oadby Town (9) | 62 |
| 47 | Corby Town (8) | 2–0 | Shepshed Dynamo (8) | 184 |
| 41 | Boldmere St Michaels (9) | 0–3 | Nantwich Town (9) | 94 |
| 42 | Matlock Town (7) | 4–0 | Pegasus Juniors (9) | 160 |
| 43 | Cradley Town (9) | 0–6 | Eastwood Town (8) | 55 |
| 44 | Grantham Town (7) | 4–0 | Lincoln United (7) | 413 |
| 45 | Chasetown (9) | 2–1 | Gedling Town (10) | 76 |
| 46 | AFC Telford United (7) | 1–1 | Rugby Town (7) | 1,065 |
| replay | Rugby Town (7) | 2–3 | AFC Telford United (7) | 265 |
| 48 | Chesham United (7) | 0–1 | Brackley Town (8) | 224 |
| 49 | St Margaretsbury (9) | 0–0 | Billericay Town (7) | 228 |
| replay | Billericay Town (7) | 2–3 | St Margaretsbury (9) | 302 |
| 50 | Northwood (7) | 3–0 | March Town United (10) | 141 |
| 51 | Rothwell Town (8) | 1–3 | Wivenhoe Town (8) | 75 |
| 52 | Welwyn Garden City (9) | 3–2 | Beaconsfield SYCOB (8) | 71 |
| 53 | Ruislip Manor (9) | 1–1 | Redbridge (7) | 97 |
| replay | Redbridge (7) | 2–1 | Ruislip Manor (9) | 88 |
| 54 | Wroxham (9) | 2–0 | Diss Town (9) | 228 |
| 55 | Woodford United (9) | 5–0 | Harwich & Parkeston (9) | 78 |
| 56 | East Thurrock United (7) | 1–2 | Harrow Borough (7) | 96 |
| 57 | Hampton & Richmond (7) | 3–0 | Witham Town (9) | 226 |
| 58 | Halstead Town (9) | 1–3 | Lowestoft Town (9) | 142 |
| 59 | Aveley (8) | 1–2 | Burnham Ramblers (9) | 76 |
| 60 | Brentwood Town (9) | 3–1 | Great Wakering Rovers (8) | 147 |
| 61 | Barkingside (9) | 1–6 | Maldon Town (7) | 61 |
| 62 | Brook House (9) | 9–1 | Clacton Town (9) | 91 |
| 63 | Bedford Town (7) | 2–2 | AFC Sudbury (9) | 460 |
| replay | AFC Sudbury (9) | 2–1 | Bedford Town (7) | 441 |

| Tie | Home team (tier) | Score | Away team (tier) | Att. |
| 64 | AFC Hornchurch | 2–0 | Stansted (9) | 415 |
| 65 | Cogenhoe United (9) | 4–2 | Clapton (9) | 68 |
| 66 | Heybridge Swifts (7) | 1–0 | Arlesey Town (8) | 169 |
| 67 | Stanway Rovers (10) | 0–0 | Wealdstone (7) | 170 |
| replay | Wealdstone (7) | 3–0 | Stanway Rovers (10) | 179 |
| 68 | Chelmsford City (7) | 1–1 | Harlow Town (8) | 301 |
| replay | Harlow Town (8) | 0–1 | Chelmsford City (7) | 206 |
| 69 | Ipswich Wanderers (9) | 1–1 | Hemel Hempstead Town (8) | 126 |
| replay | Hemel Hempstead Town (8) | 4–1 | Ipswich Wanderers (9) | 155 |
| 70 | Potton United (9) | 0–1 | Leyton (7) | 84 |
| 71 | Hitchin Town (7) | 4–1 | Waltham Forest (8) | 168 |
| 72 | Enfield Town (8) | 3–0 | Waltham Abbey (9) | 314 |
| 73 | Bury Town (9) | 2–2 | Boreham Wood (8) | 166 |
| replay | Boreham Wood (8) | 4–2 | Bury Town (9) | 128 |
| 74 | Northampton Spencer (9) | 1–2 | Aylesbury United (7) | 208 |
| 75 | Staines Town (7) | 1–1 | Dunstable Town (8) | 174 |
| replay | Dunstable Town (8) | 0–1 | Staines Town (7) | 118 |
| 76 | Hendon (7) | 6–0 | Biggleswade United (9) | 116 |
| 77 | Southall (9) | 6–3 | Mildenhall Town (9) | 75 |
| 78 | Banbury United (7) | 2–1 | King's Lynn (7) | 549 |
| 79 | Berkhamsted Town (8) | 3–0 | Barton Rovers (8) | 144 |
| 80 | Cheshunt (7) | 1–2 | Braintree Town (7) | 132 |
| 81 | Slough Town (7) | 4–1 | Oxford City (9) | 312 |
| 82 | Camberley Town (9) | 1–0 | Epsom & Ewell (9) | 73 |
| 83 | Cray Wanderers (8) | 4–1 | Kingstonian (8) | 225 |
| 84 | Fleet Town (8) | 3–2 | Thatcham Town (9) | 138 |
| 85 | Lordswood (9) | 1–2 | AFC Totton (9) | 71 |
| 86 | Didcot Town (9) | 0–0 | Herne Bay (9) | 269 |
| replay | Herne Bay (9) | 2–6 | Didcot Town (9) | 211 |
| 87 | Bashley (8) | 0–1 | Dover Athletic (8) | 141 |
| 88 | Burgess Hill Town (8) | 0–4 | Walton & Hersham (7) | 169 |
| 89 | Abingdon United (9) | 1–1 | Dulwich Hamlet (8) | 102 |
| replay | Dulwich Hamlet (8) | 3–2 | Abingdon United (9) | 115 |
| 90 | Banstead Athletic (8) | 3–0 | Moneyfields (9) | 72 |
| 91 | Three Bridges (9) | 1–3 | Chipstead (9) | 59 |
| 92 | Croydon Athletic (8) | 1–3 | Ramsgate (8) | 101 |
| 93 | Bedfont (9) | 1–4 | Bromley (7) | 128 |
| 94 | Horsham YMCA (9) | 1–2 | Croydon (9) | 72 |
| 95 | AFC Wimbledon (7) | 2–2 | Ashford Town (Middx) (8) | 1,868 |
| replay | Ashford Town (Middx) (8) | 0–2 | AFC Wimbledon (7) | 720 |
| 96 | Ashford Town (Kent) (8) | 0–3 | Windsor & Eton (7) | 163 |
| 97 | Maidstone United (9) | 1–2 | Burnham (8) | 347 |
| 98 | Folkestone Invicta (7) | 3–1 | Egham Town (9) | 212 |
| 99 | Chessington & Hook United (9) | 0–3 | Hassocks (9) | 129 |
| 100 | Wick (9) | 0–4 | Worthing (7) | 303 |
| 101 | Eastbourne Town (9) | 1–2 | Gosport Borough (9) | 160 |
| 102 | Margate (7) | 4–0 | Cowes Sports (9) | 672 |
| 103 | Dorking (9) | 1–3 | Deal Town (9) | 111 |
| 104 | Fisher Athletic (7) | 6–2 | Tooting & Mitcham United (8) | 164 |
| 105 | Chatham Town (8) | 3–4 | Leatherhead (8) | 251 |
| 106 | Metropolitan Police (8) | 2–0 | Tunbridge Wells (9) | 83 |
| 107 | Hastings United (8) | 3–3 | Tonbridge Angels (8) | 555 |
| replay | Tonbridge Angels (8) | 2–1 | Hastings United (8) | 460 |
| 108 | Swindon Supermarine (8) | 1–0 | Melksham Town (9) | 101 |
| 109 | Fairford Town (9) | 0–1 | Bishop's Cleeve (9) | 75 |
| 110 | Liskeard Athletic (11) | 1–1 | Bitton (9) | 102 |
| replay | Bitton (9) | 1–0 | Liskeard Athletic (11) | 130 |
| 111 | Cirencester Town (7) | 5–3 | Wimborne Town (9) | 147 |
| 112 | Bath City (7) | 1–0 | Cinderford Town (8) | 404 |
| 113 | Clevedon Town (8) | 1–1 | Salisbury City (7) | 254 |
| replay | Salisbury City (7) | 4–2 | Clevedon Town (8) | 506 |
| 114 | Taunton Town (8) | 3–0 | Odd Down (9) | 283 |
| 115 | Paulton Rovers (8) | 3–2 | Barnstaple Town (9) | 102 |
| 116 | Chippenham Town (7) | 4–0 | Falmouth Town (11) | 443 |
| 117 | Penzance (11) | 0–1 | Bemerton Heath Harlequins (9) | 178 |
| 118 | Gloucester City (7) | 0–0 | Christchurch (9) | 280 |
| replay | Christchurch (9) | 3–0 | Gloucester City (7) | 103 |
| 119 | Tiverton Town (7) | 1–1 | Evesham United (7) | 392 |
| replay | Evesham United (7) | 0–1 | Tiverton Town (7) | 130 |
| 120 | Yate Town (7) | 2–0 | Bodmin Town (11) | 170 |
| 121 | Merthyr Tydfil (7) | 3–2 | St Blazey (11) | 407 |
| 122 | Bournemouth (9) | 1–1 | Mangotsfield United (7) | 130 |
| replay | Mangotsfield United (7) | 7–0 | Bournemouth (9) | 197 |
| 123 | Hamworthy United (9) | 0–2 | Team Bath (7) | 132 |
| 124 | Highworth Town (9) | 2–1 | Elmore (10) | 135 |

== Second qualifying round ==
Matches played on weekend of Saturday 24 September 2005. A total of 168 clubs took part in this stage of the competition, including the 124 winners from the first qualifying round and 44 Level 6 clubs, from Conference North and Conference South, entering at this stage. Great Harwood Town, Hebburn Town and Staveley Miners Welfare from Level 10 of English football were the lowest-ranked clubs to qualify for this round of the competition.

| Tie | Home team (tier) | Score | Away team (tier) | Att. |
| 1 | Consett (9) | 1–5 | Ossett Town (7) | 166 |
| 2 | Billingham Synthonia (9) | 0–3 | North Ferriby United (7) | 183 |
| 3 | Blyth Spartans (7) | 1–0 | Prescot Cables (7) | 484 |
| 4 | Armthorpe Welfare (9) | 0–2 | Rossendale United (8) | 110 |
| 5 | Dunston Federation Brewery (9) | 1–1 | Thornaby (9) | 124 |
| replay | Thornaby (9) | 2–1 | Dunston Federation Brewery (9) | |
| 6 | Trafford (9) | 1–1 | Whitby Town (7) | 164 |
| replay | Whitby Town (7) | 6–0 | Trafford (9) | 196 |
| 7 | Harrogate Town (6) | 3–0 | Great Harwood Town (10) | 346 |
| 8 | Chester-le-Street Town (9) | 1–3 | Leigh RMI (6) | 193 |
| 9 | Marine (7) | 1–1 | Cammell Laird (9) | 358 |
| replay | Cammell Laird (9) | 3–1 | Marine (7) | 205 |
| 10 | Worksop Town (6) | 0–1 | Witton Albion (7) | 348 |
| 11 | Skelmersdale United (9) | 0–0 | Bishop Auckland (8) | 509 |
| replay | Bishop Auckland (8) | 1–2 | Skelmersdale United (9) | 125 |
| 12 | Hyde United (6) | 2–1 | Lancaster City (6) | 333 |
| 13 | St Helens Town (9) | 0–2 | Alfreton Town (6) | 142 |
| 14 | Vauxhall Motors (6) | 2–0 | Ramsbottom United (9) | 109 |
| 15 | Barrow (6) | 5–1 | Hebburn Town (10) | 911 |
| 16 | Farsley Celtic (7) | 2–0 | Bradford Park Avenue (7) | 403 |
| 17 | Gainsborough Trinity (6) | 2–2 | Goole (8) | 448 |
| replay | Goole (8) | 1–2 | Gainsborough Trinity (6) | 298 |
| 18 | Frickley Athletic (7) | 1–4 | Northwich Victoria (6) | 392 |
| 19 | Droylsden (6) | 1–2 | Burscough (7) | 316 |
| 20 | Salford City (9) | 1–0 | Gateshead (7) | 213 |
| 21 | Stalybridge Celtic (6) | 0–0 | Workington (6) | 448 |
| replay | Workington (6) | 2–1 | Stalybridge Celtic (6) | 315 |
| 22 | Bromsgrove Rovers (8) | 3–1 | Hinckley United (6) | 425 |
| 23 | Leamington (9) | 2–2 | Oadby Town (9) | 861 |
| replay | Oadby Town (9) | 1–1 (2–4 p) | Leamington (9) | 356 |
| 24 | Chasetown (9) | 3–3 | Belper Town (8) | 167 |
| replay | Belper Town (8) | 1–4 | Chasetown (9) | 154 |
| 25 | Brackley Town (8) | 1–1 | Banbury United (7) | 680 |
| replay | Banbury United (7) | 5–2 | Brackley Town (8) | 960 |
| 26 | Eastwood Town (8) | 1–1 | Cambridge City (6) | 225 |
| replay | Cambridge City (6) | 3–1 | Eastwood Town (8) | 263 |
| 27 | Nuneaton Borough (6) | 3–1 | AFC Telford United (7) | 1,174 |
| 28 | Matlock Town (7) | 2–0 | Corby Town (8) | 333 |
| 29 | Glapwell (9) | 0–1 | Halesowen Town (7) | 171 |
| 30 | Redditch United (6) | 1–1 | Woodford United (9) | 316 |
| replay | Woodford United (9) | 2–2 (10–9 p) | Redditch United (6) | 208 |
| 31 | Malvern Town (9) | 1–4 | Histon (6) | 196 |
| 32 | Hednesford Town (6) | 2–0 | Moor Green (6) | 491 |
| 33 | Leek Town (7) | 1–0 | Grantham Town (7) | 347 |
| 34 | Kettering Town (6) | 1–0 | Stafford Rangers (6) | 971 |
| 35 | Cogenhoe United (9) | 3–2 | Staveley Miners Welfare (10) | 91 |
| 36 | Solihull Borough (8) | 3–0 | Ilkeston Town (7) | 237 |
| 37 | Nantwich Town (9) | 0–1 | Hucknall Town (6) | 214 |
| 38 | Thurrock (6) | 3–2 | Hemel Hempstead Town (8) | 93 |
| 39 | Boreham Wood (8) | 0–2 | Welling United (6) | 267 |
| 40 | Wivenhoe Town (8) | 1–4 | Heybridge Swifts (7) | 241 |
| 41 | Bognor Regis Town (6) | 1–1 | Basingstoke Town (6) | 552 |
| replay | Basingstoke Town (6) | 2–1 | Bognor Regis Town (6) | 315 |
| 42 | Yeading (6) | 3–0 | Maidenhead United (6) | 185 |

| Tie | Home team (tier) | Score | Away team (tier) | Att. |
| 43 | Hendon (7) | 0–0 | Metropolitan Police (8) | 155 |
| replay | Metropolitan Police (8) | 1–0 | Hendon (7) | 104 |
| 44 | AFC Hornchurch | 1–4 | Worthing (7) | 544 |
| 45 | Burnham (8) | 1–1 | Lowestoft Town (9) | 110 |
| replay | Lowestoft Town (9) | 1–1 (2–4 p) | Burnham (8) | 264 |
| 46 | Bromley (7) | 2–1 | Chipstead (9) | 407 |
| 47 | Staines Town (7) | 1–1 | Croydon (9) | 251 |
| replay | Croydon (9) | 1–2 | Staines Town (7) | 82 |
| 48 | Redbridge (7) | 2–2 | Eastbourne Borough (6) | 113 |
| replay | Eastbourne Borough (6) | 5–1 | Redbridge (7) | 359 |
| 49 | Deal Town (9) | 1–3 | Hitchin Town (7) | 211 |
| 50 | Chelmsford City (7) | 1–0 | Dover Athletic (8) | 404 |
| 51 | AFC Wimbledon (7) | 0–3 | Walton & Hersham (7) | 1,930 |
| 52 | Cray Wanderers (8) | 4–1 | Camberley Town (9) | 129 |
| 53 | Leyton (7) | 0–1 | Lewes (6) | 162 |
| 54 | St Margaretsbury (9) | 0–1 | Folkestone Invicta (7) | 212 |
| 55 | Braintree Town (7) | 2–0 | Didcot Town (9) | 306 |
| 56 | Brentwood Town (9) | 1–2 | Windsor & Eton (7) | 144 |
| 57 | Wroxham (9) | 2–0 | Slough Town (7) | 267 |
| 58 | Fisher Athletic (7) | 2–3 | Tonbridge Angels (8) | 257 |
| 59 | Northwood (7) | 0–0 | Aylesbury United (7) | 249 |
| replay | Aylesbury United (7) | 2–0 | Northwood (7) | 262 |
| 60 | Margate (7) | 1–0 | Carshalton Athletic (6) | 773 |
| 61 | Hayes (6) | 1–1 | Brook House (9) | 406 |
| replay | Brook House (9) | 0–4 | Hayes (6) | 342 |
| 62 | Welwyn Garden City (9) | 4–2 | AFC Sudbury (9) | 304 |
| 63 | Hassocks (9) | 0–1 | Dulwich Hamlet (8) | 319 |
| 64 | Ramsgate (8) | 1–0 | Southall (9) | 231 |
| 65 | Farnborough Town (6) | 3–0 | Berkhamsted Town (8) | 456 |
| 66 | Enfield Town (8) | 1–1 | St Albans City (6) | 525 |
| replay | St Albans City (6) | 3–0 | Enfield Town (8) | 436 |
| 67 | Sutton United (6) | 2–0 | Maldon Town (7) | 402 |
| 68 | Banstead Athletic (8) | 1–4 | Wealdstone (7) | 164 |
| 69 | Harrow Borough (7) | 2–1 | Burnham Ramblers (9) | 140 |
| 70 | Hampton & Richmond Borough (7) | 1–1 | Leatherhead (8) | 357 |
| replay | Leatherhead (8) | 2–1 | Hampton & Richmond Borough (7) | 273 |
| 71 | Fleet Town (8) | 0–2 | Bishop's Stortford (6) | 201 |
| 72 | Highworth Town (9) | 0–7 | Tiverton Town (7) | 284 |
| 73 | Yate Town (7) | 0–2 | Salisbury City (7) | 371 |
| 74 | Christchurch (9) | 0–2 | Cirencester Town (7) | 165 |
| 75 | Worcester City (6) | 7–0 | Bemerton Heath Harlequins (9) | 579 |
| 76 | Taunton Town (8) | 1–1 | Merthyr Tydfil (7) | 414 |
| replay | Merthyr Tydfil (7) | 2–1 | Taunton Town (8) | 370 |
| 77 | Gosport Borough (9) | 3–4 | Bath City (7) | 440 |
| 78 | Mangotsfield United (7) | 4–2 | Swindon Supermarine (8) | 278 |
| 79 | Bishop's Cleeve (9) | 3–0 | Bitton (9) | 210 |
| 80 | Dorchester Town (6) | 4–2 | Team Bath (7) | 317 |
| 81 | Weston-super-Mare (6) | 2–2 | Weymouth (6) | 704 |
| replay | Weymouth (6) | 1–0 | Weston-super-Mare (6) | 1,003 |
| 82 | Chippenham Town (7) | 4–0 | Newport County (6) | 949 |
| 83 | AFC Totton (9) | 2–1 | Paulton Rovers (8) | 107 |
| 84 | Eastleigh (6) | 0–0 | Havant & Waterlooville (6) | 470 |
| replay | Havant & Waterlooville (6) | 4–1 | Eastleigh (6) | 329 |

== Third qualifying round ==
Matches played on weekend of Saturday 8 October 2005. A total of 84 clubs took part, all having progressed from the second qualifying round. The round featured twelve clubs from Level 9 still in the competition, being the lowest ranked clubs in this round.

| Tie | Home team (tier) | Score | Away team (tier) | Att. |
| 1 | Northwich Victoria (6) | 1–0 | North Ferriby United (7) | 684 |
| 2 | Vauxhall Motors (6) | 4–3 | Skelmersdale United (9) | 243 |
| 3 | Leigh RMI (6) | 1–1 | Gainsborough Trinity (6) | 165 |
| replay | Gainsborough Trinity (6) | 2–1 | Leigh RMI (6) | 385 |
| 4 | Rossendale United (8) | 0–1 | Blyth Spartans (7) | 209 |
| 5 | Leek Town (7) | 2–1 | Thornaby (9) | 211 |
| 6 | Matlock Town (7) | 3–6 | Ossett Town (7) | 332 |
| 7 | Harrogate Town (6) | 2–0 | Witton Albion (7) | 402 |
| 8 | Hucknall Town (6) | 2–2 | Cammell Laird (9) | 352 |
| replay | Cammell Laird (9) | 0–1 | Hucknall Town (6) | 395 |
| 9 | Alfreton Town (6) | 2–1 | Whitby Town (7) | 230 |
| 10 | Burscough (7) | 2–0 | Workington (6) | 303 |
| 11 | Salford City (9) | 0–1 | Farsley Celtic (7) | 195 |
| 12 | Hyde United (6) | 2–3 | Barrow (6) | 469 |
| 13 | Thurrock (6) | 1–0 | Solihull Borough (8) | 126 |
| 14 | Banbury United (7) | 3–4 | Hednesford Town (6) | 1,005 |
| 15 | Leamington (9) | 2–0 | Woodford United (9) | 1,027 |
| 16 | Cogenhoe United (9) | 1–1 | Chasetown (9) | 184 |
| replay | Chasetown (9) | 4–3 | Cogenhoe United (9) | 374 |
| 17 | Hayes (6) | 2–0 | Bishop's Stortford (6) | 231 |
| 18 | Wroxham (9) | 1–1 | Aylesbury United (7) | 257 |
| replay | Aylesbury United (7) | 4–2 | Wroxham (9) | 381 |
| 19 | Cambridge City (6) | 4–1 | Hitchin Town (7) | 461 |
| 20 | Heybridge Swifts (7) | 1–1 | Braintree Town (7) | 362 |
| replay | Braintree Town (7) | 3–1 | Heybridge Swifts (7) | 479 |
| 21 | Harrow Borough (7) | 0–1 | Welling United (6) | 258 |
| 22 | Wealdstone (7) | 2–4 | Burnham (8) | 241 |

| Tie | Home team (tier) | Score | Away team (tier) | Att. |
| 23 | Halesowen Town (7) | 0–2 | Bromsgrove Rovers (8) | 756 |
| 24 | Histon (6) | 2–1 | Welwyn Garden City (9) | 373 |
| 25 | St Albans City (6) | 0–0 | Kettering Town (6) | 882 |
| replay | Kettering Town (6) | 4–0 | St Albans City (6) | 1,220 |
| 26 | Nuneaton Borough (6) | 1–1 | Chelmsford City (7) | 915 |
| replay | Chelmsford City (7) | 1–2 | Nuneaton Borough (6) | 379 |
| 27 | Bishop's Cleeve (9) | 1–1 | AFC Totton (9) | 187 |
| replay | AFC Totton (9) | 0–4 | Bishop's Cleeve (9) | 322 |
| 28 | Metropolitan Police (8) | 3–3 | Eastbourne Borough (6) | 201 |
| replay | Eastbourne Borough (6) | 3–2 | Metropolitan Police (8) | 601 |
| 29 | Bromley (7) | 0–0 | Mangotsfield United (7) | 488 |
| replay | Mangotsfield United (7) | 0–1 | Bromley (7) | 403 |
| 30 | Worcester City (6) | 3–0 | Tonbridge Angels (8) | 684 |
| 31 | Cirencester Town (7) | 2–1 | Havant & Waterlooville (6) | 278 |
| 32 | Worthing (7) | 2–4 | Basingstoke Town (6) | 571 |
| 33 | Yeading (6) | 1–1 | Dorchester Town (6) | 151 |
| replay | Dorchester Town (6) | 3–2 | Yeading (6) | 394 |
| 34 | Merthyr Tydfil (7) | 2–1 | Salisbury City (7) | 615 |
| 35 | Folkestone Invicta (7) | 2–0 | Staines Town (7) | 337 |
| 36 | Tiverton Town (7) | 2–1 | Windsor & Eton (7) | 531 |
| 37 | Leatherhead (8) | 0–2 | Farnborough Town (6) | 609 |
| 38 | Chippenham Town (7) | 1–0 | Sutton United (6) | 725 |
| 39 | Ramsgate (8) | 1–0 | Walton & Hersham (7) | 301 |
| 40 | Margate (7) | 0–3 | Cray Wanderers (8) | 805 |
| 41 | Lewes (6) | 1–0 | Dulwich Hamlet (8) | 539 |
| 42 | Weymouth (6) | 1–0 | Bath City (7) | 1,232 |

== Fourth qualifying round ==
Matches played on weekend of Saturday 22 October 2005. A total of 64 clubs took part, 42 having progressed from the third qualifying round and 22 clubs from Conference Premier, forming Level 5 of English football, entering at this stage. Bishop's Cleeve, Chasetown and Leamington from Level 9 of English football were the lowest-ranked clubs to qualify for this round of the competition.

| Tie | Home team (tier) | Score | Away team (tier) | Att. |
| 1 | Harrogate Town (6) | 1–0 | Scarborough (5) | 1,591 |
| 2 | Tamworth (5) | 3–1 | Altrincham (5) | 801 |
| 3 | Southport (5) | 1–0 | Kidderminster Harriers (5) | 1,108 |
| 4 | Hucknall Town (6) | 0–0 | Burscough (7) | 750 |
| replay | Burscough (7) | 6–2 | Hucknall Town (6) | 415 |
| 5 | Blyth Spartans (7) | 2–2 | Chasetown (9) | 926 |
| replay | Chasetown (9) | 1–0 | Blyth Spartans (7) | 2,134 |
| 6 | Northwich Victoria (6) | 4–1 | Barrow (6) | 1,116 |
| 7 | Gainsborough Trinity (6) | 0–4 | York City (5) | 1,725 |
| 8 | Ossett Town (7) | 2–3 | Leamington (9) | 900 |
| 9 | Accrington Stanley (5) | 1–1 | Worcester City (6) | 940 |
| replay | Worcester City (6) | 3–2 | Accrington Stanley (5) | 1,331 |
| 10 | Hednesford Town (6) | 3–0 | Vauxhall Motors (6) | 628 |
| 11 | Halifax Town (5) | 2–0 | Farsley Celtic (7) | 1,469 |
| 12 | Burton Albion (5) | 2–0 | Leek Town (7) | 1,467 |
| 13 | Hereford United (5) | 0–0 | Alfreton Town (6) | 1,768 |
| replay | Alfreton Town (6) | 1–1 (3–4 p) | Hereford United (5) | 740 |
| 14 | Bromsgrove Rovers (8) | 0–2 | Morecambe (5) | 919 |
| 15 | Crawley Town (5) | 0–1 | Braintree Town (7) | 970 |

| Tie | Home team (tier) | Score | Away team (tier) | Att. |
| 16 | Canvey Island (5) | 1–1 | Burnham (8) | 363 |
| replay | Burnham (8) | 2–1 | Canvey Island (5) | 607 |
| 17 | Kettering Town (6) | 3–0 | Gravesend & Northfleet (5) | 1,647 |
| 18 | Dorchester Town (6) | 1–2 | Welling United (6) | 533 |
| 19 | Bromley (7) | 0–1 | Aldershot Town (5) | 1,454 |
| 20 | Histon (6) | 3–1 | Hayes (6) | 588 |
| 21 | Grays Athletic (5) | 2–0 | Cray Wanderers (8) | 1,360 |
| 22 | Nuneaton Borough (6) | 0–0 | Tiverton Town (7) | 1,237 |
| replay | Tiverton Town (7) | 0–1 | Nuneaton Borough (6) | 885 |
| 23 | Exeter City (5) | 0–1 | Stevenage Borough (5) | 3,421 |
| 24 | Woking (5) | 3–0 | Thurrock (6) | 1,486 |
| 25 | Basingstoke Town (6) | 0–1 | Chippenham Town (7) | 1,072 |
| 26 | Cambridge City (6) | 2–1 | Lewes (6) | 588 |
| 27 | Merthyr Tydfil (7) | 2–0 | Farnborough Town (6) | 1,019 |
| 28 | Aylesbury United (7) | 0–2 | Folkestone Invicta (7) | 646 |
| 29 | Forest Green Rovers (5) | 2–3 | Dagenham & Redbridge (5) | 751 |
| 30 | Ramsgate (8) | 3–0 | Cirencester Town (7) | 697 |
| 31 | Weymouth (6) | 2–1 | Cambridge United (5) | 1,652 |
| 32 | Bishop's Cleeve (9) | 0–1 | Eastbourne Borough (6) | 625 |

== Competition proper ==
See 2005–06 FA Cup for details of the rounds from the first round proper onwards.
