= 1956–57 Spartan League =

Spartan League
- Season: 1956–57

The 1956–57 Spartan League season was the 39th in the history of Spartan League, an association football league in London and the adjoining counties. The league consisted of 14 teams.

== League table ==
Spartan League
- Season: 1956–57
- Champions: Briggs Sports
- Promoted: None
- Relegated: None

The division featured 14 teams, all from last season.

Pos	Team	Pld	W	D	L	GF	GA	GR	Pts
1	Briggs Sports (C)	26	20	3	3	51	17	3.000	43
2	Hertford Town	26	16	5	5	59	24	2.458	37
3	Huntley & Palmers	26	17	2	7	78	43	1.814	36
4	Harrow Town	26	16	3	7	73	37	1.973	35
5	Vauxhall Motors	26	14	2	10	66	57	1.158	30
6	Marlow	26	13	1	12	71	47	1.511	27
7	Wolverton Town & B.R.	26	10	4	12	63	66	0.955	24
8	Metropolitan Police	26	10	2	14	51	64	0.797	22
9	Wood Green Town	26	10	2	14	47	69	0.681	22
10	Histon	26	8	5	13	57	80	0.713	21
11	Welwyn Garden City	26	8	4	14	61	79	0.772	20
12	Hoddesdon Town	26	6	8	12	47	63	0.746	20
13	Ford Sports	26	7	1	18	37	76	0.487	15
14	Tring Town	26	4	4	18	38	77	0.494	12

Rules for classification: 1) points; 2) goal ratio.
(C) Champions
