= 1952–53 Spartan League =

Spartan League
- Season: 1952–53

The 1952–53 Spartan League season was the 35th in the history of Spartan League. The league consisted of 16 clubs.

== League table ==
=== Premier Division ===
Spartan League Premier Division
- Season: 1952–53
- Champions: Ware
- Promoted: None

The division featured 16 clubs, including four that were new to the division:

- Ware
- Tufnell Park Edmonton, from Isthmian League
- Ford Sports
- Polytechnic

Pos	Team	Pld	W	D	L	GF	GA	GR	Pts	Result
1	Ware (C)	30	24	4	2	88	36	2.444	52	
2	Briggs Sports	30	22	5	3	105	26	4.038	49	
3	Metropolitan Police	30	20	4	6	93	40	2.325	44	
4	Histon	30	18	3	9	78	47	1.660	39	
5	Hertford Town	30	13	8	9	82	60	1.367	34	
6	Hoddesdon Town	30	13	5	12	80	69	1.159	31	
7	Harrow Town	30	13	2	15	52	57	0.912	28	
8	Wolverton Town & B.R.	30	10	7	13	68	75	0.907	27	
9	Tufnell Park Edmonton	30	11	3	16	54	61	0.885	25	
10	Vauxhall Motors	30	9	7	14	63	80	0.788	25	
11	Huntley & Palmers	30	10	3	17	73	89	0.820	23	
12	Ford Sports	30	10	3	17	48	72	0.667	23	
13	Marlow	30	9	4	17	51	106	0.481	22	
14	Wood Green Town	30	10	1	19	47	88	0.534	21	
15	Letchworth Town	30	7	5	18	43	82	0.524	19	Left the Division
16	Polytechnic	30	8	2	20	46	83	0.554	18	Left the Division

Source: Non-League Matters
Rules for classification: 1) points; 2) goal ratio.
(C) Champions
