= 1949–50 Spartan League =

Spartan League
- Season: 1949–50

The 1949–50 Spartan League season was the 32nd in the history of Spartan League. The league consisted of 14 teams.

== League table ==
Spartan League
- Season: 1949–50
- Champions: Briggs Sports
- Promoted: Cambridge Town

The division featured 14 teams, 12 from last season and 2 new teams:

- Slough Centre
- Stevenage Town

Pos	Team	Pld	W	D	L	GF	GA	GR	Pts	Promotion or relegation
1	Briggs Sports (C)	26	22	3	1	91	20	4.550	47	
2	Cambridge Town (P)	26	15	4	7	73	39	1.872	34	Promotion to Athenian League
3	Aylesbury United	26	14	6	6	69	48	1.438	34	
4	Wolverton Town & B.R.	26	13	6	7	78	43	1.814	32	
5	Brentwood & Warley	26	13	4	9	59	44	1.341	30	
6	Letchworth Town	26	13	2	11	53	50	1.060	28	
7	Slough Centre	26	10	6	10	50	62	0.806	26	
8	Vauxhall Motors	26	10	4	12	50	55	0.909	24	
9	Metropolitan Police	26	8	7	11	53	65	0.815	23	
10	Huntley & Palmers	26	9	4	13	60	72	0.833	22	
11	Harrow Town	26	8	3	15	53	89	0.596	19	
12	Willesden	26	8	2	16	39	57	0.684	18	
13	Stevenage Town	26	6	5	15	51	79	0.646	17	Left the Division
14	Hoddesdon Town	26	4	2	20	41	97	0.423	10	Left the Division

Rules for classification: 1) points; 2) goal ratio.
(C) Champions; (P) Promoted
