= Southwark Borough F.C. =

Southwark Borough
- Full name: Southwark Borough Football Club
- Founded: 1975
- Dissolved: 1990
- Ground: Surrey Docks Stadium, Rotherhithe
- Capacity: 5,300
- Final season; 1988–89: Spartan League Premier Division, 9th of 20

Southwark Borough Football Club was a football club based in the London Borough of Southwark, England.

== History ==
Founded in 1975 as Southwark Sports, the club initially competed in Sunday league football. In 1982, the club joined the London Spartan League, and advanced to the Premier Division in 1984. In 1988, the club changed its name to Southwark Borough, one year after it first entered the FA Vase. Following a ninth-place finish in the 1988–89 Spartan League, Southwark Borough was ejected from the league for breaking misconduct rules. The club folded on 3 April 1990 after failing to gain admission to the Essex Senior League.

== Ground ==
The club initially played at Southwark Sports Ground in Dulwich. In 1988, Southwark Borough entered a groundsharing agreement with Fisher Athletic at their Surrey Docks Stadium. The groundshare was terminated at the end of the season following Southwark's expulsion from the Spartan League. Southwark later secured a pitch in Kidbrooke before folding due to not having a league to compete in.

== Records ==
- Best FA Vase performance: First round, 1988–89
- Record attendance: 325 vs Fisher Athletic, Spartan League, 3 April 1989
