= Parthenon League =

- Founded: 1951
- First season: 1951–52
- Folded: 1966
- Country: England
- Divisions: One (1951–1960); Two (1960–1966)
- Domestic cup(s): FA Cup
- Most championships: Wapping Sports (3)

The Parthenon League was a football league covering Greater London and the surrounding area.

== History ==
The league was formed in 1951 with 11 clubs, nine of which had come from the Middlesex Senior League. By 1954 the league had grown to 16 clubs, but then slowly lost members until 1960 when a second division was added, although largely filled with reserve teams. However, the league was dissolved in 1966 and was replaced by the Middlesex League.

== List of champions ==
Season	Champions
1951–52	Wingate
1952–53	Kingsbury Town
1953–54	Crown & Manor
1954–55	Basildon Town
1955–56	Boreham Wood
1956–57	Willesden
1957–58	Wapping Sports
1958–59	Twickenham
1959–60	Wapping Sports
1960–61	Wapping Sports
1961–62	Fisher Athletic
1962–63	Wandsworth
1963–64	Wandsworth
1964–65	Harefield United
1965–66	Surbiton Byron

== Member clubs ==
During its history, member clubs included:

- Addlestone
- Arlesey Town
- Atlas Sports
- Baldock Town
- Barnes
- Basildon Town
- Battersea United
- Bees Club
- Boreham Wood
- British European Airways
- Byron Wanderers
- Camberley Wanderers
- Canvey Island
- Chalfont National
- Chalfont St Peter
- Chingford
- Collier Row
- Crown & Manor
- Ditton Old Boys
- Edmonton BOC
- Egham Town
- Epping Town
- Finsbury
- Fisher Athletic
- Harefield United
- Harold Hill
- Hatfield Town
- Kings Langley
- Kingsbury Town
- Kodak
- London Transport Buses
- Northolt Saints
- Orpington Athletic
- Paddington Town
- Post Office Engineers
- Rainham Town Reserves
- Rayners Lane
- Rickmansworth Town
- Rootes Athletic
- Ruislip Town
- Saffron Walden Town
- Shefford Town
- South Vale Glacier
- Southall Athletic
- Southall Corinthians
- Spelthorne
- Staines Town
- Surbiton Byron
- Surbiton Town
- Tudor Park
- Twickenham
- Wandsworth
- Wapping Sports
- Westfield
- Willesden
- Wingate
