= Leavesden Hospital F.C. =

Leavesden Hospital
- Full name: Leavesden Hospital Football Club
- Founded: 1887
- Dissolved: 1989
- Ground: Woodside Road, Leavesden
Home colours

Leavesden Hospital Football Club was a football club based in Leavesden, England.

== History ==
On 9 October 1870, the Metropolitan Asylum for Chronic Imbeciles was founded by the Metropolitan Asylums Board in Leavesden, Hertfordshire. Following a name change to Leavesden Asylum, a football club baring the same name was founded in 1887 due to recreation being encouraged at the facility. The club entered the Hertfordshire Senior County League Western Division in 1908, leaving the league system in 1910, before returning in 1912. Following World War I, now under the guise of Leavesden Mental Hospital, the club entered the FA Amateur Cup for the first time in 1919, losing 3–1 against Langley Park. In 1922, the club once again left the Herts County League, joining the reformed league in 1927, winning the league for a fourth time in the 1927–28 season. Following World War II, the club rejoined the London League under the name of Leavesden Hospital. In 1955, the club joined the Herts County League, winning the league in 1958, 1961, 1962 and 1964, before joining the Spartan League in 1965, rejoining the Herts County League two years later. In 1974, the club entered the Guinness Book of World Records for the longest cup tie in football, with seven ties between played against London Colney between 6 November and 17 December 1971 in the Herts Intermediate Cup. In the 1988–89 season, the club played their final season in senior football, finishing 15th in the Herts County League Division One.

== Ground ==
The club played at Woodside Road in Leavesden. The ground was later used by Kings Langley.

== Records ==
- Best FA Amateur Cup performance: Third round, 1919–20, 1922–23, 1932–33, 1946–47
- Best FA Vase performance: First round, 1985–86, 1986–87
