= Spartan League =

Former association football league in England

- Founded: 1907
- First season: 1907–08
- Folded: 1997
- Country: England
- Divisions: 1–4
- Promotion to: Isthmian League
- Domestic cup(s): FA Cup, FA Amateur Cup, FA Vase

The Spartan League was a football league in England covering London and adjacent counties. Established in 1907, it merged with the South Midlands League in 1997 to form the Spartan South Midlands League.

== History ==
The Spartan League was established in 1907 with six clubs; Bromley, Dulwich Hamlet, Leytonstone, Nunhead, Shepherd's Bush and West Norwood. It gained five clubs for its second season, and split into two divisions, Eastern and Western. In 1909–10 the split was changed to Section A and B, before the league reverted to a single division in 1910–11.

The league added a second division in 1920, and in 1925 it added another division, with Division Two divided into 2A and 2B. This structure lasted until 1928 when the league gained another division, with both Division One and Two divided into East and West divisions. The following season the league was reorganised, with a Premier Division created above Division One and Division Two still divided into East and West sections. This structure remained unchanged until World War II. The league restarted in 1945 and was divided into three divisions; Central, Eastern and Western. The following season it reverted to a single division.

In 1975 the league merged with the Metropolitan–London League, forming the London Spartan League, which ran with two divisions; Division One and Division Two. In 1977 they were renamed, becoming the Premier Division and Senior Division. The league readopted the name Spartan League in 1987, A third division, the Intermediate Division, was added for the 1987–88 season; by 1992 it had been renamed Division Two.

In 1997 it merged with the South Midlands League to form the Spartan South Midlands League. The new league initially ran with two Premier Divisions (north and south), a Senior Division and two Division Ones (north and south).

== Champions ==
=== Spartan League ===
First season with six clubs.

Season	Spartan League
1907–08	Bromley

For the 1908–09 season, the league was split into two regional sections: Eastern and Western Sections.

Season	Eastern Section	Western Section
1908–09	Luton Clarence	Aylesbury United

For the following season, the regional divisions were renamed the Section B and fSection A respectively.

Season	Section A	Section B
1909–10	2nd Coldstream Guards	St Albans City

For the 1910–11 season, the league reverted to a single division

Season	Spartan League
1910–11	2nd Coldstream Guards
1911–12	St Albans City
1912–13	2nd Coldstream Guards
1913–14	Chesham Generals
1919–20	Wycombe Wanderers

For the 1920–21 season, Division Two was added.

Season	Division One	Division Two
1920–21	Wycombe Wanderers	Wycombe Wanderers Reserves
1921–22	Chesham United	Chesham United Reserves
1922–23	Chesham United	Wendover
1923–24	Leavesden Mental Hospital	Leighton United
1924–25	Chesham United	Wealdstone Reserves

For the 1925–26 season, Division Two was divided in Division Two A and Division Two B

Season	Division One	Division Two A	Division Two B
1925–26	G.E.R. (Romford)	Lyons Club	Artillery College
1926–27	Maidenhead United	Berkhamsted Town	Ware
1927–28	Botwell Mission	Leighton United	Hoddesdon Town

For the 1928–29 season, both Division One and Two divided into East and West divisions.

Season	Division One East	Division One West	Division Two East	Division Two West
1928–29	Metropolitan Police	Aylesbury United	Metropolitan Police Reserves	R.A.F.(Royal Air Force) Halton

For the following season the league was reorganised, with a Premier Division created above Division One and Division Two still divided into East and West sections.

Season	Premier Division	Division One	Division Two East	Division Two West
1929–30	Metropolitan Police	Haywards Sports (Enfield)	Letchworth Town	Marlow
1930–31	Haywards Sports (Enfield)	Windsor & Eton	Callender Athletic	Maidenhead United Reserves
1931–32	Maidenhead United	Callender Athletic	Bishop's Stortford	R.A.F.(Royal Air Force) Uxbridge
1932–33	Chesham United	Waterlows (Dunstable)	Hoxton Manor	Maidenhead United Reserves
1933–34	Maidenhead United	Apsley	Jurgens (Purfleet)	Henley Town
1934–35	Hitchin Town	Jurgens (Purfleet)	Lea Bridge Gas	Pinner
1935–36	Waterlows (Dunstable)	Hoddesdon Town	Letchworth Town Reserves	Hazells (Aylesbury)
1936–37	Metropolitan Police	Henley Town	Saffron Walden Town	Wendover
1937–38	Waterlows (Dunstable)	Marlow	R.A.F.(Royal Air Force) Henlow	Pinner
1938–39	Metropolitan Police	Aylesbury United	Ford Sports (Dagenham)	Harrow Town

In the 1945–46 season the league had three divisions.

Season	Eastern Division	Central Division	Western Division
1945–46	Cambridge Town	Metropolitan Police	Hounslow

For the 1946–47 season, the league reverted to a single division.

Season	Champions
1946–47	Metropolitan Police
1947–48	Cambridge Town
1948–49	Cambridge Town
1949–50	Briggs Sports
1950–51	Yiewsley
1951–52	Briggs Sports
1952–53	Ware
1953–54	Metropolitan Police
1954–55	Metropolitan Police
1955–56	Briggs Sports
1956–57	Briggs Sports
1957–58	Briggs Sports
1958–59	Briggs Sports
1959–60	Staines Town
1960–61	Vauxhall Motors
1961–62	Petters Sports
1962–63	Cheshunt
1963–64	Croydon Amateurs
1964–65	Hampton
1965–66	Hampton
1966–67	Hampton
1967–68	Tring Town
1968–69	Vauxhall Motors
1969–70	Hampton
1970–71	Hoddesdon Town
1971–72	Egham Town
1972–73	Farnborough Town
1973–74	Farnborough Town
1974–75	Farnborough Town

In 1975 the Spartan League merged with the Metropolitan-London League to form the London Spartan League.

=== London Spartan League ===
For the 1975–76 season, the London Spartan League ran with two divisions; Division One and Division Two.

Season	Division One	Division Two
1975–76	Farnborough Town	Chalfont St. Peter
1976–77	Cray Wanderers	Ulysses

For the 1977–78 season, the Division One and Division Two were renamed as Premier Division and Senior Division respectively.

Season	Premier Division	Senior Division
1977–78	Cray Wanderers	Fisher Athletic
1978–79	Swanley Town	Waltham Abbey
1979–80	Berkhamsted Town	Greenwich Borough
1980–81	Fisher Athletic	Bracknell Town
1981–82	Fisher Athletic	Highfield
1982–83	Bracknell Town	Beaconsfield United
1983–84	Collier Row	Hanwell Town
1984–85	Burnham	Crown & Manor
1985–86	Collier Row	Corinthian-Casuals
1986–87	Yeading	Southwark Sports

In 1987 the London Spartan League readopted the name to Spartan League

=== Spartan League ===
For the 1987–88 season, the league added an Intermediate Division.

Season	Premier Division	Division One	Intermediate Division
1987–88	Edgware Town	Catford Wanderers	Newmont Travel
1988–89	Abingdon Town	Newmont Travel	
1989–90	Edgware Town	KPG Tipples	
1990–91	Walthamstow Pennant	Sangley Sports	

For the 1991–92 season, the Intermediate Division was renamed as Division Two.

Season	Premier Division	Division One	Division Two
1991–92	Northwood	Willesden Hawkeye	Clapton Villa
1992–93	Brimsdown Rovers	Metrogas	Bridon Ropes
1993–94	Willesden Hawkeye	Lewisham Elms	Tottenham Wine
1994–95	Croydon Athletic	Tottenham Wine	Southwark Faweh
1995–96	St. Margaretsbury	Leyton County	Classic Inter
1996–97	Barkingside	Leyton County	Odua United

In 1997 the Spartan League merged with the South Midlands League to form the Spartan South Midlands League.
