= Wood Green Town F.C. =

Coordinates: 51°36′20.12″N 0°05′33.97″W

Wood Green Town
- Full name: Wood Green Town Football Club
- Founded: 1911
- Dissolved: 1973
- Ground: Coles Park, Tottenham
Home colours

Wood Green Town Football Club was a football club based in Tottenham in the London Borough of Haringey, England. Formed in 1911 as a breakaway from Tufnell Park, they merged with Edmonton (a descendant of Tufnell Park) in 1973 to form Edmonton & Haringey. During their history the club were known as Tufnell Spartans, Wood Green, Wood Green Town and Haringey Borough.

== History ==
The club was established in 1911 when the reserve team of Tufnell Park broke away to form a club named Tufnell Spartans. The new club continued in the Spartan League in place of Tufnell Park reserves. In 1920 the club was renamed Wood Green, and with the league gaining a second division, the club were placed in Division One. In 1927–28 they finished bottom of Division One, but avoided relegation as league reorganisation saw two Division Ones created for the 1928–29 season, with Wood Green placed in Division One East.

Further reorganisation in 1929 saw Wood Green placed in the Premier Division for the 1929–30 season. In 1930 they were renamed Wood Green Town, adopting the name of a club that had played in the London League between 1909 and 1913. After finishing bottom of the Premier Division in 1930–31 the club were relegated to Division One. Despite only finishing fourth in Division One the following season, they were promoted back to the Premier Division at the first attempt. However, they finished bottom of the Premier Division again in 1933–34, resulting in another relegation to Division One.

In 1937–38 Wood Green Town were Division One runners-up, earning promotion to the Premier Division. During World War II they played in the Middlesex Senior League, winning it in 1940–41. The club were placed in the Central Division of the Spartan League when it resumed in 1945–46, with a third-place finish seeing them gain a place in the Premier Division for the following season. However, they were relegated at the end of the 1947–48 season. The club were promoted back to the Premier Division in 1950–51. They finished bottom of the Premier Division in 1965–66 and again in 1966–67, after which they were lost their bid for re-election and dropped into the North Suburban League.

In 1970 the club was renamed Haringey Borough and joined the Reserves Division Two of the Greater London League. The league merged with the Metropolitan League in 1971, with the club playing in the reserves division of the new Metropolitan–London League. In 1973 they merged with Edmonton to form Edmonton & Haringey.

== Colours ==
The club's colours were green shirts and white trim.

== Ground ==
The club initially played in Barnet, before relocating to Wood Green Recreation Ground. In 1920 they moved again, this time to a ground on White Hart Lane opposite Perth Road. They moved to their final ground, Coles Park, in 1930, with the ground later used by the merged club Edmonton & Haringey.

== Honours ==
- Middlesex Senior League
  - Champions 1940–41

== Records ==
- Best FA Cup performance: First qualifying round, 1946–47

== See also ==
- Wood Green Town F.C. players
