= Egham Town F.C. =

English football club

Coordinates: 51°25′35″N 0°32′0″W

Egham Town
- Full name: Egham Town Football Club
- Nickname: The Sarnies
- Founded: 1963
- Ground: Runnymede Stadium, Egham
- Capacity: 5,500 (262 seated)
- Chairman: Steve and Danny Bennett
- Manager: Jordan Berry
- League: Isthmian League South Central Division
- 2024–25: Combined Counties League Premier Division North, 1st of 20 (promoted)
Home colours

Egham Town Football Club is a football club based in Egham, Surrey, England. They are currently members of the Isthmian League South Central Division and play at the Runnymede Stadium.

== History ==
The club was originally formed as Runnymede Rovers in 1877, before reforming as Egham in 1905. They won the West Surrey League in 1921–22, before becoming founder members of the Surrey Senior League in 1922 and going on to win the league in its first season. In 1927–28 the club finished as league runners-up, and subsequently joined Division One West of the Spartan League. A sixth-placed finish in 1928–29 saw them placed in the Premier Division for the 1929–30 season. After finishing bottom of the division in 1931–32, they were relegated to Division One.

Egham left the Spartan League at the end of the 1932–33 season and returned to the Surrey Senior League. The club closed down during World War II, but was not restored when the war ended. A public meeting on 9 December 1963 led to the club being reformed as Egham Town. They joined the Parthenon League for the 1964–65 season, but rejoined the Surrey Senior League at the end of the season. After two seasons in the league, they moved to the Spartan League in 1967. The club won the Spartan League in 1971–72, before joining Division Two of the Athenian League in 1974. They won Division Two at the first attempt, earning promotion to Division One. The following season saw them finish as Division One runners-up.

In 1977 Egham joined Division Two of the Isthmian League. Restructuring saw them moved to Division One South in 1984, before Division Two was restored in 1991. They were relegated to Division Three at the end of the 1997–98 season and remained there until restructuring saw them placed in Division One South in 2002. The club were transferred to Division One West of the Southern League for the 2004–05 season, but were moved back to Division Two of the Isthmian League the following season. In 2006 the club left the Isthmian League and joined the Premier Division of the Combined Counties League. They were Premier Division champions in 2012–13, earning promotion to Division One Central of the Southern League. A third-place finish in 2015–16 saw them qualify for the promotion play-offs, in which they were beaten 4–2 on penalties in the semi-finals by St Ives Town after a 2–2 draw. The following season saw the club finish fifth, qualifying for the play-offs again and they went on to lose 4–0 to Farnborough in the semi-finals.

At the end of the 2017–18 season, Egham were transferred to the South Central Division of the Isthmian League. They finished bottom of the division in 2018–19 and were relegated to Premier Division of the Combined Counties League. When the league gained an additional division as part of restructuring, the club were placed in the Premier Division North. They were runners-up in the Premier Division North in 2022–23, qualifying for a promotion/relegation play-off against Merstham of the Isthmian League, which Merstham won 3–1. The 2024–25 season saw Egham promoted back to step four.

== Ground ==
The club has played at the Runnymede Stadium since their re-establishment in 1963. The land was previously part of a recreation ground and was offered to the club by the local council. The ground currently has a capacity of 5,500, of which 262 is seated and 3,300 is covered. In May 2021 the Brian Askew stand was destroyed in a fire.

== Honours ==
- Combined Counties League
  - Premier Division champions 2012–13
  - Premier Division North champions 2024–25
- Athenian League
  - Division Two champions 1974–75
- Spartan League
  - Champions 1971–72
- Surrey Senior League
  - Champions 1922–23
- West Surrey League
  - Champions 1921–22

== Records ==
- Best FA Cup performance: Fourth qualifying round, 1990–91, 2016–17
- Best FA Vase performance: Fifth round, 2024–25
- Record attendance: 1,400 vs Wycombe Wanderers, FA Cup second qualifying round, 1972–73
- Biggest win: 11–0 vs Hilltop, Combined CountiesLeague Premier Division North, 3 December 2024
- Most appearances: Dave Jones, over 850
- Most goals: Mark Butler, 153

== See also ==
- Egham Town F.C. players
- Egham Town F.C. managers
