= Berkhamsted Town F.C. =

Berkhamsted Town
- Full name: Berkhamsted Town Football Club
- Nickname(s): The Lilywhites
- Founded: 1919; 106 years ago (as Berkhamsted Comrades)
- Dissolved: 2009
- Ground: Broadwater
- Capacity: 2,000
- 2007–08: Southern League Division One Midlands, 21st (relegated)
Home colours	Away colours

Berkhamsted Town F.C. was a football club from Berkhamsted, Hertfordshire. The club was founded in 1919, played in a black & white strip, and was nicknamed the Lilywhites or Berko. The team began the 2008–09 season playing in the Spartan South Midlands League Premier Division, but was dissolved in January 2009 due to its outstanding debts. Supporters set up a new club, Berkhamsted F.C., in the summer of 2009.

== History ==
- 1919 – The club was formed as Berkhamsted Comrades by ex-servicemen. The side played in two leagues, in Division One of the West Herts League and the West Division of the Herts County League at Lower Kings Road.
- 1922 – The club joined Division Two of the Spartan League and changed its name to Berkhamsted Town FC.
- 1927 – Promotion to the top division was won after winning Division 2A and a 4–0 play-off victory against Division 2B winners, Ware
- 1933 – Frank Broome became the club's top scorer with 53 goals in the season. The following year the player signed for Aston Villa and went on to win seven caps for England.
- 1935 – The club won the Bucks Charity Cup after a 2–0 victory over Maidenhead United in the final.
- 1950 – After finishing runners-up in their division, promotion was won to the Premier Division of the Spartan League.
- 1951 – The club became founder members of the Delphian League. The Herts Charity Shield was shared with Stevenage.
- 1953 – The Herts Senior Cup was won for the first time after St Albans City were beaten 4–2 in the final.
- 1963 – Club finished runners-up in the final season of the Delphian League before it was incorporated into the Athenian League
- 1966 – Due to financial constraints the club resigned and joined the Spartan League instead
- 1980 – Berkhamsted Town won the recently formed championship of the London Spartan League as well as the Herts Charity Shield and St Marys Cup.
- 1983 – The club moves to the re-located Broadwater ground on Lower Kings Road
- 1984 – The club joined the Isthmian League
- 1985 – The last 32 of the FA Vase was reached for the first time, whilst three cup finals were won against Letchworth, Cambridge United and Chesham United in the Herts Charity Shield, Wallspan Floodlit Cup and St Marys Cup respectively.
- 1993 – A third-place finish allowed the Lilywhites to gain promotion to Division One of the Isthmian League
- 1999 – The first ever relegation in the history of club occurred as Berko slipped back down to Division Two
- 2000–01 – The final of the FA Vase was reached for the first time, however, the Lilywhites succumbed 2–1 to Taunton Town in front of 8,439 fans at Villa Park. In an epic journey and many a daunting away trip, Berko overcame Leighton Town, Hythe United, Hornchurch, St Helens Town, Brigg Town and gained a two-legged semi-final victory over Bedlington Terriers. In the return match at Broadwater, a new record crowd of 1,542 passed through the turnstiles to witness the 5–1 aggregate scoreline. The successful run in the FA Vase caused a huge backlog of league fixtures and a run of 13 games from the middle of April to end of the season tripped the Lilywhites in their quest for promotion, finishing 2 points adrift in 4th place in Division Two of the Isthmian League.
- 2004–05 – With reorganisation of the non-league pyramid structure taking place, the club switched to the Southern Football League, competing in the Eastern Division.
- 2005–06 – Despite crippling financial troubles, current chairman, Guillermo Ganet, stabilised the club off the field and managed the team to safety in the Eastern Division.
- 2006–07 – With further pyramid restructuring taking place, the club was switched to Southern League Division One Midlands and after a poor start to the season Guillermo Ganet stepped down as 1st team manager. Former Leighton Town boss, Paul Burgess took over the Broadwater hot-seat in October 2006 with Tony Duncombe as his assistant.
- 2007–08 – Tony Duncombe becomes 1st team manager. Team finish bottom of the Southern Midlands League and are relegated.
- 2009 – The club is wound up when all attempts to resolve its debts are reported to have failed.

== Major honours ==
- Spartan League
  - Premier Division Champions 1979–80
  - Division 2A Champions 1926–27
- FA Vase
  - Runners Up 2000–01
- Hertfordshire Senior Cup
  - Winners 1952–53, 2002–03
- Hertfordshire Charity Shield
  - Winners 1950–51, 1973–74, 1979–80, 1984–85, 1990–91

== Club records ==
- Best League Position: – 7th Isthmian Division One North 2002–03
- Best FA Cup Performance: – 3rd Qualifying Round 2001–02, 1992–93, 1987–88
- Best FA Trophy Performance: – 3rd Round 1997–98
- Best FA Vase Performance: – Runners-up 2000–01

== Former players ==
1. Players that have played/managed in the Football League or any foreign equivalent to this level (i.e. fully professional league).
2. Players with full international caps.
3. Players that hold a club record or have captained the club.

- (England) Dean Williams
- (England) Maurice Cook
- (England) Ray Mabbutt
