= Banstead Athletic F.C. =

Association football club in England

Coordinates: 51.3035°N 0.2329°W

Banstead Athletic
- Full name: Banstead Athletic Football Club
- Nicknames: The A's, The Yellows
- Founded: 1944
- Ground: Merland Rise, Tadworth
- Capacity: 1,500
- Chairman: Gary Grabban
- Manager: Paul Hill, Mike Fox and Tom Taylor
- League: Southern Counties East League Division One
- 2025–26: Southern Counties East League Division One, 13th of 18
Home colours	Away colours

Banstead Athletic Football Club is a football club based in Tadworth, Surrey, England. The club are currently members of the Southern Counties East League Division One and play at Merland Rise in Tadworth. They are affiliated to the Surrey County Football Association.

== History ==
The club was established in 1944 as Banstead Juniors, before adopting their current name during the 1946–47 season. After winning the Surrey Intermediate Cup that season, the club won back-to-back league titles before moving up to the Surrey Senior League in 1949. They finished as runners-up in their first season, and went on to win four consecutive league titles between 1950–51 and 1953–54, with Harry Clark scoring 81 goals in 26 games in 1950–51. The next two seasons saw them finish as runners-up to Dorking, before they won their fifth title in 1956–57. Although they finished as runners-up again for the next two seasons, the club went into decline at the start of the 1960s, and finished second-from-bottom in 1961–62.

The 1964–65 season saw Banstead win their sixth Surrey Senior League title, claiming the championship on goal average from Chobham, and they moved up to the Spartan League. When the league merged with the Metropolitan–London League in 1975, forming the London Spartan League, Banstead were placed in Division One.

In 1979 the club switched to the Athenian League, where they remained until it disbanded in 1984, winning the League Cup in 1980–81. When the league folded most clubs (including Banstead) joining the Isthmian League, with Banstead placed in Division Two South. The league was reorganised in 1991, with the club placed in Division Two. They remained in the division until 2002 when further league reorganisation saw them moved to Division One South. Two years later another reorganisation saw them placed in Division One.

At the end of the 2005–06 season Banstead resigned from the Isthmian League and dropped into the Combined Counties League Premier Division. After finishing bottom of the division in 2011–12 they were relegated to Division One. They were Division One champions in 2016–17, earning promotion back to the Premier Division. Following league reorganisation in 2021 the club were placed in the Premier Division South. However, after finishing second-from-bottom of the division in 2022–23 they were relegated to Division One of the Southern Combination.

== Honours ==
- Spartan League
  - League Cup winners 1965–66
- Athenian League
  - League Cup winners 1980–81
- Combined Counties League
  - Division One champions 2016–17
- Surrey Senior League
  - Champions 1950–51, 1951–52, 1952–53, 1953–54, 1956–57, 1964–65
- Surrey Intermediate Cup
  - Winners 1946–47

== Records ==
- Highest league position: 4th in Isthmian League Division Two, 1995–96
- Best FA Cup performance: Third qualifying round, 1981–82, 2000–01
- Best FA Trophy performance: First round, 2003–04, 2004–05
- Best FA Vase performance: Semi-finals, 1996–97
- Record attendance: 1,400 vs Leytonstone, FA Amateur Cup, 1953
- Most appearances: Dennis Wall
- Most goals: Harry Clark

== See also ==
- Banstead Athletic F.C. players
- Banstead Athletic F.C. managers
