= Molesey F.C. =

English football club based in Surrey

Coordinates: 51°24′5″N 0°22′5″W

- Full name: Molesey Football Club
- Nickname: The Moles
- Founded: 1946
- Ground: Walton Road, West Molesey
- Capacity: 4,000 (160 seated)
- Chairman: Tracy Teague
- Manager: Peter Doherty
- League: Combined Counties League Division One
- 2024–25: Combined Counties League Division One, 9th of 23
Home colours

Molesey Football Club is a semi-professional football club based in West Molesey, Surrey, England. They are currently members of the Combined Counties League Division One and play at Walton Road.

== History ==
=== Pre-merger ===
The original Molesey club was established by former Corinthian player James Jenkinson Knox in autumn 1892 under the name Hampton Court and East Molesey Association Football Club. Their first match was played on 24 September against Barnes, with the new club winning 14–5. They were renamed the Molesey Football Club in 1896, but following Knox's death a series of clubs emerged, including Molesey Athletic and Molesey St Mary's, before Molesey St Paul's was formed in 1905. The club absorbed Molesey Football Club in 1911 and became Molesey & St Paul's United, before being renamed Molesey Football Club. The club joined the Surrey Junior League in 1920 and won Section 3 in their first season, going on to win the championship playoffs with a 100 win over Godalming Federation. They also won the Surrey Junior Cup and the Surrey Junior Charity Cup.

Molesey then moved up to Division One of the Southern Suburban League. However, the cost of travelling led to the club resigning from the league after a single season, dropping into the Kingston & District League. The remainder of the 1920s was a successful period for the club as they won the league and the Teck Cup four times, the Surrey Junior Charity Cup in three consecutive seasons (1926–27 to 1928–29), the Chambers Cup twice and the League Cup once. In the 1933 the club moved up to the Central Division of the Surrey Intermediate League. In 1939 another merger saw Molesey and Molesey Athletic of the Kingston & District League amalgamate to form Molesey United. The new club played in the Kingston & District League, winning it in 1939–40 and 1940–41.

West Molesey Old Boys was formed in 1927 and entered the Kingston & District League, going on to win the league in 1933–34. After winning the Teck Cup in 1934–35, they moved up to the Surrey Intermediate League in 1936 and won the Surrey Intermediate Charity Cup in 1937–38.

=== Post-merger ===
In 1946 Molesey United and West Molesey Old Boys merged to form Molesey Football Club. The new club joined the Surrey Intermediate League and won the league in their first season. After moving to their new ground on Walton Road, they moved up to the Surrey Senior League in 1953. After winning the Surrey Senior Charity Cup in 1956–57, the club were league champions in 1957–58. In 1959 they transferred to the Spartan League, finishing as runners-up in the league and losing the League Cup final in 1959–60. The club won the League Cup the following season and were losing finalists in 1963–64 and 1971–72. They remained in the Spartan League until joining Division Two of the Athenian League in 1973. In 1977 the club moved leagues again, this time joining Division Two of the Isthmian League.

League reorganisation saw Molesey placed in Division Two South in 1984, where they remained until finishing as runners-up in 1989–90, earning promotion to Division One. They won the Southern Combination Challenge Cup in 1990–91. In 1992–93 the club were Division One runners-up and were promoted to the Premier Division. The 1993–94 season saw them reach the first round of the FA Cup for the first time, losing 4–0 at home to Bath City; the club also won the Southern Combination Challenge Cup for a second time. They were relegated back to Division One at the end of the 1995–96 season and then to Division Two in 1998–99. Further league reorganisation in 2002 led to the club becoming members of Division One South, before being placed in Division One in 2004 and then back in Division One South in 2006 as the league was restructured.

In 2007–08 Molesey finished bottom of Division One South and were relegated to the Premier Division of the Combined Counties League. In 2012–13 they won the Southern Combination Challenge Cup again. They won the Premier Division title in 2014–15 and were promoted back to Division One South of the Isthmian League, as well as winning the Southern Combination Challenge Cup, a trophy they retained the following season. Following league reorganisation, the club were placed in the South Central Division in 2018. The 2018–19 season saw them finish second-from-bottom of the division, resulting in relegation to the Premier Division of the Combined Counties League. In 2021 league reorganisation led to the club being placed in the Premier Division South. They finished bottom of the division in 2021–22 and were relegated to Division One.

== Ground ==
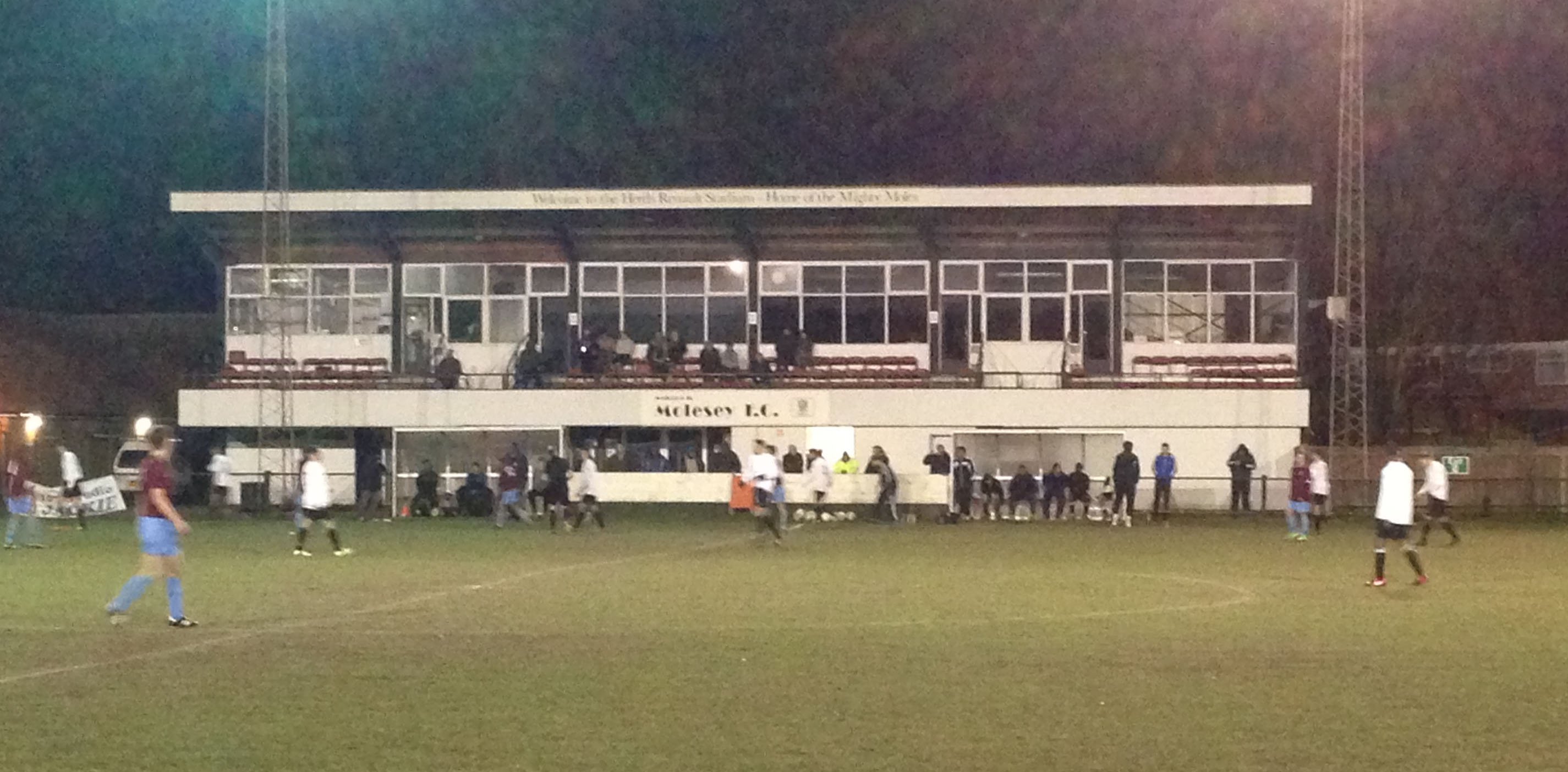
Walton Road

The Molesey of the inter-war era originally played at the Royal Oak Ground, before relocating to Hurst Park in 1927, at which point the Royal Oak Ground was taken over by West Molesey Old Boys. The merged club initially played at the Rec, before purchasing Walton Road prior to the 1953–54 season. A clubhouse was built and opened by Stanley Rous in 1960. The stadium was used for the filming of some of the scenes in the 2002 film Bend It Like Beckham.

== Honours ==
- Combined Counties League
  - Premier Division champions 2014–15
- Spartan League
  - League Cup winners 1960–61
- Surrey Intermediate League
  - Champions 1946–47
- Surrey Senior League
  - Champions 1957–58
- Southern Combination Cup
  - Winners 1990–91, 1993–94, 2012–13, 2014–15, 2015–16
- Surrey Senior Charity Cup
  - Winners 1956–57

== Records ==
- Best FA Cup performance: First round, 1993–94
- Best FA Trophy performance: First round, 1990–91, 1994–95, 1998–99, 2004–05
- Best FA Vase performance: Quarter-finals, 1981–82
- Record attendance: 1,553 vs Tooting & Mitcham United, Surrey Senior Cup second round, 1959–60
- Most appearances: Frank Hanley, 453
- Most goals: Michael Rose, 139

== See also ==
- Molesey F.C. players
- Molesey F.C. managers
