= Chalfont St Peter A.F.C. =

English football club

Coordinates: 51°36′38″N 0°33′31″W

Chalfont St Peter
- Full name: Chalfont St Peter Association Football Club
- Nickname: The Saints
- Founded: 1926
- Ground: Mill Meadow, Chalfont St Peter
- Capacity: 4,500 (220 seated)
- Chairman: Denis Mair
- Manager: Tom Burton
- League: Thames Valley Premier League Premier Division
- 2025–26: Combined Counties League Division One, 23rd of 23 (relegated)
Home colours	Away colours

Chalfont St Peter Association Football Club is a football club based in Chalfont St Peter, Buckinghamshire, England. They are currently members of the Thames Valley Premier League Premier Division and play at Mill Meadow.

== History ==
The club was established in 1926 and initially played in local leagues. In 1948 they joined Division Two of the Great Western Combination and were runners-up in their first season, earning promotion to Division One. They were Division One runners-up in 1955–56, but left the league at the end of the 1957–58 season to join the Parthenon League, where Chalfont National also played. Two seasons later the club left to join the London League.

In 1962 Chalfont St Peter joined the Spartan League. When it merged with the Metropolitan–London League to form the London Spartan League in 1975, the club were placed in to Division Two. After winning Division Two in 1975–76, the club switched to Division Two of the Athenian League, although at the end of the 1976–77 season the league was reduced to a single division. They won the League Cup in 1976–77 and 1982–83, and were Athenian League runners-up in 1983–84. However, the league folded at the end of the season and the club joined Division Two North of the Isthmian League. They were transferred to Division One South in 1986, and were champions of the division in 1987–88, earning promotion to Division One.

Chalfont St Peter remained in Division One until the end of the 1993–94 season, when they were relegated to Division Two. They were relegated to Division Three at the end of the 1999–2000 after finishing bottom of Division Two. In 2002 Division Three became Division Two following league reorganisation. In 2006 the division was abolished and the club joined the Premier Division of the Spartan South Midlands League. They were Premier Division runners-up and won the league's Challenge Trophy in 2007–08 with a 2–0 win against Brimsdown Rovers, before finishing as runners-up again in 2009–10. They went on to win both the Challenge Trophy and Premier Division in 2010–11, earning promotion to Division One Central of the Southern League. At the end of the 2017–18 season the club were transferred to the South Central Division of the Isthmian League.

The club were relegated to the Premier Division North of the Combined Counties League at the end of the 2021–22 season after losing a relegation play-off to Boldmere St Michaels. In 2023–24 they finished bottom of the Premier Division North and were relegated to Division One. The 2025–26 season saw them finish bottom of Division One, resulting in relegation to the Premier Division of the Thames Valley Premier League.

== Ground ==
The club initially played at Gold Hill Common, before moving to Mill Meadow (also known as the Playing Fields) on Gravel Hill in 1949. A stand was built in 1956, and a small amount of terracing built behind one goal, which later had cover installed. The ground currently has a capacity of 4,500, of which 220 is seated and 120 covered.

== Club staff ==
Position	Name
Manager	Tom Burton
Assistant Manager	Brandon Elliott
First Team Coach	Chris Large
Player Recruitment	James Burrell
Physio	Matt Holdship
Source: Chalfont St Peter

== Honours ==
- Isthmian League
  - Division Two champions 1987–88
- Athenian League
  - League Cup winners 1976–77, 1982–83
- Spartan League
  - Division Two champions 1975–76
- Spartan South Midlands League
  - Premier Division champions 2010–11
  - Challenge Trophy winners 2007–08, 2010–11
- Berks & Bucks Intermediate Cup
  - Winners 1952–53, 1984–85
- Berks & Bucks Benevolent Cup
  - Winners 1964–65
- Wycombe Senior Cup
  - Winners 2006–07

== Records ==
- Highest league position: 11th in Isthmian League Division One, 1989–90, 1990–91
- Best FA Cup best performance: Third qualifying round, 1985–86, 1998–99, 2012–13, 2014–15
- Best FA Trophy best performance: Third qualifying round, 1989–90, 1991–92
- Best FA Vase best performance: Semi-finals, 2008–09
- Record attendance: 2,550 vs Watford, friendly match, 1985
- Most goals, Eddie Sedgwick (148)
- Biggest victory: 10–1 vs Kentish Town, Spartan South Midlands League Premier Division, 23 December 2008
- Heaviest defeat: 0–13 vs Lewes, Isthmian League Division Three, 7 November 2000

== See also ==
- Chalfont St Peter A.F.C. players
