= Crown & Manor F.C. =

Association football club in England

Crown & Manor
- Full name: Crown & Manor Football Club
- Founded: 1939
- Ground: Mile End Stadium
Home colours

Crown & Manor Football Club is a football club based in Islington, England.

== History ==
In 1939, Crown & Manor was founded following a merger between Crown Club and Hoxton Manor. In 1951, Crown & Manor were founding members of the Parthenon League, playing in the league until the 1959–60 season, when they finished third. In 1960, Crown & Manor joined the Spartan League. In 1975, Crown & Manor were founding members of the London Spartan League, following a name change. During the 1983–84 season, the club reached the fourth round of the FA Vase, before losing 5–0 away to Leyton-Wingate. In 1998, Crown & Manor left the Spartan South Midlands League, becoming founding members of the London Intermediate League. In 2003, the club joined the Middlesex County League for a three-season spell.

== Colours ==
The club's colours are red with black trim.

== Ground ==
After the formation of the club, Crown & Manor groundshared with Cheshunt, before moving to Turkey Street in Enfield between 1974 and 1984. The club later moved to the Mile End Stadium. Currently they are situated in Hoxton next to Regents Canal.

== Records ==
- Best FA Cup performance: First qualifying round, 1949–50
- Best FA Vase performance: Fourth round, 1983–84
