= London Tigers F.C. =

Association football club in England

Coordinates: 51.670258°N 0.624157°W

London Tigers
- Full name: London Tigers Football Club
- Nickname: The Tigers
- Founded: 2006
- Ground: Spratleys Meadow, Amersham
- League: Middlesex County League Division One Central
- 2024–25: Middlesex County League Premier Division, 15th of 16 (relegated)
Home colours

London Tigers Football Club is a football club based in Greenford, in the London Borough of Ealing, England. Formed in 2006 as a merger of Kingsbury Town and London Tigers, they are currently members of the Middlesex County League Division One Central and play at Spratleys Meadow in Amersham.

== History ==
=== Kingsbury Town ===
Kingsbury Town were established in 1919 under an unknown name, but were soon renamed Davis Sports, before becoming Kingsbury Town in 1923. They joined the Willesden & District League and were runners-up in their first season. The club won the Division Two title in 1934–35, earning promotion to the Senior Division. In 1943 they joined the Middlesex Senior League, going on to win the league's Charity Cup in 1944–45, 1945–46 and 1946–47.

In 1951 Kingsbury were one of nine Middlesex Senior League clubs that left to become founder members of the Parthenon League and were champions in 1952–53., In 1960 they left to join the Spartan League, finishing bottom of the league in their first season. The club remained in the league until 1976 when they switched to Division Two of the Athenian League. The Athenian League was reduced to a single division in 1977–78, but Kingsbury at the end of the season.

Kingsbury rejoined the Spartan League in 1979, entering the Premier Division. However, two years later they returned to the Athenian League, in which they played until it folded in 1984, at which point they joined Division Two North of the Isthmian League. The club were Division Two North runners-up in 1985–86, earning promotion to Division One; the season also saw them win the Middlesex Senior Charity Cup. They finished bottom of Division One in 1989–90 and were relegated back to Division Two North. In 1991 league reorganisation saw them placed in Division Three, which became Division Two in 2002.

=== London Tigers ===
London Tigers were established in 1986 as Marylebone Football Club and were originally based in Westminster. They initially played small-sided matches, before moving to 11-a-side football, joining the Senior Division of the Middlesex County League in 2001. After sitting out the 2002–03 season, the club rejoined the league in 2003, entering the Premier Division.

=== Merged club ===
In 2006 the two clubs merged to form Kingsbury London Tigers. The new club joined the Premier Division of the Spartan South Midlands League as Division Two of the Isthmian League had been disbanded. After a single season the club requested to be renamed London Tigers, but the application was rejected by the Football Association. However, in 2012 the name change was allowed. They finished bottom of the Premier Division in 2018–19 and were relegated to Division One. In 2022–23 the club finished second-from-bottom of Division One and were relegated to the Premier Division of the Middlesex County League.

== Ground ==
Kingsbury Town initially played at a ground on Townsend Lane, which became Silver Jubilee Park. The pitch was moved to its present location in 1953. A stand was built in 1981 and floodlights installed. London Tigers later became tenants at the ground, and when the clubs merged, the new club continued playing at Silver Jubilee Park.

In 2012 the club moved to Avenue Park in Greenford, the former ground of Viking Greenford. After damage to the ground caused by fly-tipping in early 2017, the club moved to Northwood's Northwood Park ground. The club then moved to Spratleys Meadow, in Amersham.

== Records ==
- Best FA Cup performance: Second qualifying round, 2014–15
- Best FA Vase performance: First round, 2009–10, 2015–16

== See also ==
- London Tigers F.C. players
- Kingsbury Town F.C. players
- London Tigers F.C. managers
