= Vauxhall Motors F.C. (Luton) =

English football club, 1907 to 1991

- Nicknames: the Motors, Motormen
- Founded: 1907
- Dissolved: 1991
- Ground: Brache Estate, Park Street
Traditional colours

Vauxhall Motors (Luton) Football Club was an amateur association football club from Luton, Bedfordshire, which once reached the first round of the FA Cup and the quarter-finals of the FA Amateur Cup.

== History ==
The club was founded in 1907 as the works side for the Vauxhall Motors company. The club was originally known as Vauxhall Motors (Luton) to distinguish from the Ellesmere Port-based works side, and, after General Motors took over Vauxhall, the Luton side was generally just known as Vauxhall Motors while the Ellesmere Port club was known as Vauxhall GM.

The club's first major honour was winning the Bedfordshire Senior Cup in 1936–37, and in 1938 it joined the Spartan League. The Motors won their second Senior Cup in 1945–46, and in 1947–48 had its best run in the FA Cup, beating two professional sides - Bedford Town and Peterborough United - en route to the first round proper for the only time. At the first round stage, the club was drawn at home to Walsall, and despite the achievement the company did not allow players time off for extra training, which took place under floodlights after work. Although the club hosted Peterborough by putting out 2,000 seats for spectators, the club switched the tie to Kenilworth Road. In front of a crowd of over 22,000, the Motors went down 2–1, both Saddlers goals being gifts - an own goal after goalkeeper Campbell dropped a cross onto his foot and the ball rolled over the line, and the second, on half-time, a penalty after defender Hare dived to stop a shot - and the Motors' goal coming directly from a Marriott corner with 7 minutes to go.

The club won the Spartan League title twice, in 1960–61 and 1968–69, and between 1953 and 1961 won the Senior Cup five times. Its final triumph in the competition came in 1974–75.

After playing in the United Counties League in the 1970s and the South Midlands League in the 1980s, the club joined the second division of the Isthmian League (which was sponsored by Vauxhall) in 1985–86. The club finished second in 1990–91, and should have been promoted to the first division; however, the Vauxhall sponsorship of the league came to an end, and the club withdrew from competition.

=== Colin Mathurin ===
On 18 November 1985, Vauxhall Motors visited Stevenage Borough for an Isthmian League match. During the first half, Motors' forward Colin Mathurin and Boro defender Dave Watkins clashed heads in trying to meet a cross; both players received treatment but both continued. Six minutes later, Mathurin collapsed, and was taken to hospital, where he was declared dead on arrival.

== Colours ==
The club originally played in blue, and in 1948 adopted blue and gold shirts with black shorts. It retained the yellow and blue colour scheme in the 1980s as yellow shorts and socks with blue shorts, but for its final season its kit was all white with red trim.

== Ground ==
The club's ground was originally at the Vauxhall works at Kimpton Road in Luton. In 1955, the club moved to new sports premises which Vauxhall had built at the Brache Estate on Park Street.

== Notable players ==
Two of the club's players played for other clubs in the Football League - Bill Baldry at Cambridge United and Neil Madden at Luton Town.
