= Tring Athletic F.C. =

Association football club in England

Coordinates: 51°47′48″N 0°38′25″W

Tring Athletic
- Full name: Tring Athletic Football Club
- Nickname: Athletic
- Founded: 1958; 68 years ago
- Ground: The Michael Anthony Stadium; Dorian Williams Sports Centre; Cow Lane; Tring; Hertfordshire; HP23 5NS
- Capacity: 1,300 (125 seated)
- Chairman: Darrell Osborne
- Manager: Ryan Sturges
- League: Spartan South Midlands League Premier Division
- 2025–26: Spartan South Midlands League Premier Division, 7th of 20
- Website: http://www.tringathletic.co.uk
Home colours	Away colours

Tring Athletic Football Club are an English football club based in Tring, Hertfordshire. The club are currently members of the Spartan South Midlands League Premier Division and play at The Michael Anthony Stadium.

== History ==
Tring Athletic Youth FC were established in March 1958, when the founders contributed towards the purchase of 3.4 acres (14,000 m^{2}) of land at Miswell Lane. The club joined the West Herts Saturday League in the early 1960s, and despite only fielding players under-21, they won the Division One title three times in five years.

Following a spell without success, the age limit was scrapped in 1971 and the club was renamed Tring Athletic. In the mid-1970s the ground was sold to the local council and the club were relegated to Division Three. However, by the mid-1980s they were back in the Premier Division.

In 1988 the club joined Division One of the South Midlands League. They returned to Miswell Lane in 1992. After missing out on the Senior Division title in 1997–98 on goal difference, they won the league in 1999–00. In the same season they also won the Herts Charity Shield, the Herts Senior Centenary Trophy and the Cherry Red Books Trophy.

Due to an inability to install floodlights at Miswell Lane, in 2003 the club absorbed Isthmian League neighbours Tring Town F.C. with an agreement to move to their Pendley ground, which already had floodlights. In 2003–04 they finished fourth in Division One and were promoted to the Premier Division.

== Players ==
=== First-team squad ===
As of 17/08/2026

Note: Flags indicate national team as defined under FIFA eligibility rules; some limited exceptions apply. Players may hold more than one non-FIFA nationality.

No.	Pos.	Nation	Player
1	GK	ENG	Jake Alley
2	DF	ENG	Caden Barber
3	DF	ENG	Josh Chamberlain
4	DF	ENG	Greg Deer
5	MF	ENG	Frankie Hercules
6	MF	ENG	Luke Peerless
7	MF	ENG	Max Hercules
8	MF	ENG	Jack Harvey
9	MF	ENG	George Devine
11	MF	ENG	Harry Jones
12	MF	ENG	Jimmy Doherty

No.	Pos.	Nation	Player
14	MF	ENG	Dylan Fitzpatrick
15	MF	ENG	Harry Beaumont
16	DF	ENG	David O'Connor
17	DF	ENG	Elijah Hearn
18	DF	ENG	Mason Clarke
19	FW	ENG	Joshua Cross
20	FW	ENG	Harry Shepherd
21	DF	ENG	Michael Olulode
22	FW	ENG	Lewis Dixon
23	MF	ENG	Blake Argent
24	MF	ENG	Jack Stone

== Records ==
- Best FA Cup performance: First qualifying round (2006–07, 2010–11)
- Best FA Vase performance: Fifth round (2017–18, 2022–23)

== Honours ==
- Spartan South Midlands League
  - Senior Division champions 1999–2000
  - Challenge Trophy winners 2008–09, 2024–25
  - Premier Division Cup winners 2008–09, 2021–2022
  - St Marys Cup winners 1996–97, 1998–99, 2004–05, 2008–09, 2024–25
  - Division One Cup winners 1998–99, 2002–03
  - Cherry Red Books Trophy winners 1999–2000, 2000–01
- West Herts League
  - Division One champions 1961–62, 1964–65, 1965–66
  - Challenge Cup winners 1965–66
- Herts Charity Shield
  - Winners 1999–2000, 2001–02, 2007–08, 2023-24, 2024–25
- Herts Senior Centenary Trophy
  - Winners 1999–2000, 2000–01, 2002–03
