= Hoddesdon Town F.C. =

Association football club in England

Coordinates: 51°45′30.38″N 0°00′59.64″W

Hoddesdon Town
- Full name: Hoddesdon Town Football Club
- Nickname: The Lilywhites
- Founded: 1879
- Ground: Lowfield, Hoddesdon
- Capacity: 3,000
- Chairman: Stuart Varney
- Manager: Simon Riddle
- League: Eastern Counties League Division One South
- 2024–25: Eastern Counties League Division One South, 8th of 20
Home colours	Away colours

Hoddesdon Town Football Club is a football club based in Hoddesdon, Hertfordshire, England. They are currently members of the Eastern Counties League Division One South and play at Lowfield. The club were the first winners of the FA Vase.

== History ==
The club was established on 14 April 1879 as Hoddesdon Football Club. In 1885 they were founding members of the Hertfordshire County Football Association and won the inaugural Herts Senior Cup in 1886–87. The club retained the cup the following season and won it again in 1889–90. They were founder members of the East Herts League in 1896, merging with Hoddesdon Wanderers and Broxbourne Club in the same year. In 1903 the club absorbed another club, Rye Park.

In 1908 Hoddesdon joined the Eastern Division of the Hertfordshire Senior County League. The division was renamed the Central Division for the 1909–10 season, before reverting to its former name the following season. The club finished bottom of the division in 1912–13, but were divisional champions the following season. In the inter-divisional championship play-off, they finished last. In 1920 the club was renamed Hoddesdon Town. They were placed in the North-East Division for the 1921–22 season following league organisation, before the league was reduced to a single division in 1923.

Hoddesdon joined Division Two B the Spartan League in 1925. They won the division in 1928–29, but league reorganisation meant no promotion and the club was placed in Division Two East the following season. They were Division Two East runners-up in 1931–32, earning promotion to Division One. The 1935–36 season saw the club win Division One, resulting in promotion to the Premier Division. However, they finished second-from-bottom of the Premier Division the following season and were relegated back to Division One. After World War II the club were placed in the Central Division for the 1945–46 season, with a sixth-place finish seeing them earn a place in the Premier Division for the following season.

Hoddesdon were relegated after finishing bottom of the table in 1949–50, but were promoted back to the Premier Division at the first attempt. They finished bottom of the table in 1958–59, 1959–60 and 1962–63, but were runners-up in 1964–65 and went on to win the league title in 1970–71, a season that also saw them win the Spartan League Cup and the Herts Charity Shield. The club were league runners-up in the next three seasons, retaining the League Cup and the Charity Shield in 1971–72. In 1974–75 they were the first-ever winners of the FA Vase, beating Epsom & Ewell in its inaugural final at Wembley Stadium. The club left the Spartan League to the Athenian League in 1977, but when the league was disbanded in 1984 they were refused entry to the Isthmian League as they did not have use of their Lowfield ground all year round, and instead joined the Premier Division of the South Midlands League.

In 1985–86 Hoddesdon won the South Midlands League Challenge Trophy, retaining it the following season and winning it again in 1991–92. The club remained in the Premier Division until 1997 when the league merged with the Spartan League to form the Spartan South Midlands League, with Hoddesdon placed in the Premier Division North for a transitional season; a fifth-place finish in the league's first season saw them earn a place in the Premier Division the following season; the season also saw them win the Premier Division Plate. In 2004–05 Hoddesdon finished bottom of the Premier Division and were relegated to Division One. A third-place finish in 2012–13 saw them promoted back to the Premier Division. In 2016–17 they won the Premier Division Cup, defeating Wembley 1–0 in the final.

At the end of the 2017–18 season, Hoddesdon were transferred to the Essex Senior League. They won the league's Len Cordell Memorial Plate in 2020–21, defeating Woodford Town 3–0 in the final. The club were transferred back to the Premier Division of the Spartan South Midlands League for the 2022–23 season. They finished second-from-bottom of the Premier Division and were relegated to Division One South of the Eastern Counties League.

== Ground ==
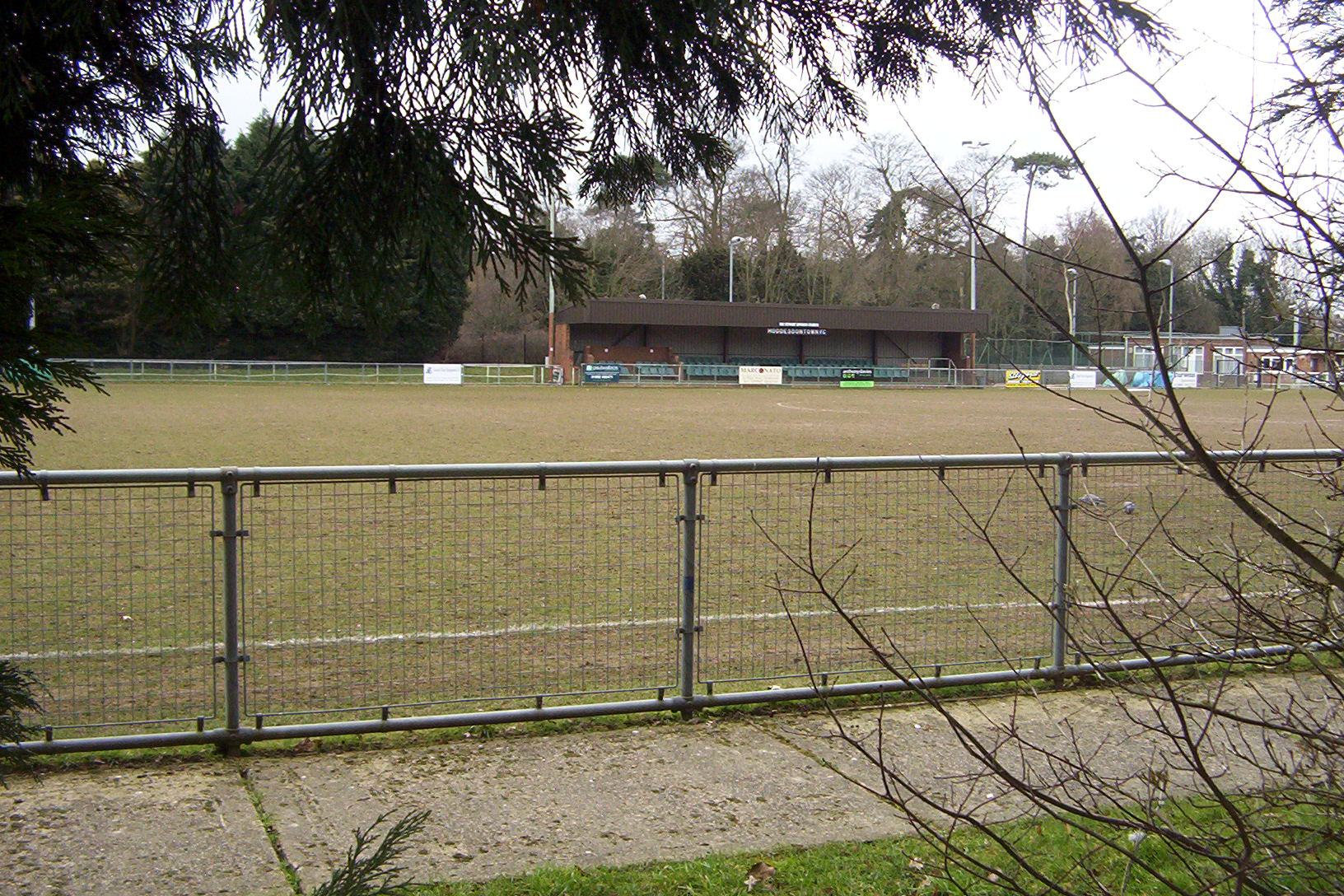
Lowfield

The club is thought to have initially played at Mansers Field, although by 1882 they had moved to Lowfield. Lowfield had previously been home to a cricket club, which continue to play there. The ground was originally an arable field owned by Robert Barclay, who donated the land and was involved in setting up the cricket club in 1879. The site was purchased by a trust in 1924, before being taken over the urban district council, with ownership later transferring to Broxbourne Borough Council. Between 1952 and 1954 the club played at Essex Road as the Lowfield site was being levelled to allow for separate cricket and football pitches.

Floodlights were installed in 1973 and inaugurated with a friendly match with West Ham United on 7 March, a game that attracted a record crowd of 3,500. The football pitch was moved further south in the early 1980s to prevent overlapping with the cricket oval, with floodlight pylons having to be moved and the original 100-seat stand now being at one end of the pitch rather than on the halfway line; in 1996 it was discovered to contain significant amounts of asbestos and was condemned. A new stand was opened the same year and seats from Burnden Park were installed the following year. A 100-capacity covered stand was opened in 2014 and another 50-seat stand was installed in 2016.

== Honours ==
- FA Vase
  - Winners 1974–75
- Spartan South Midlands League
  - Premier Division Plate winners 1997–98
  - Premier Division Cup winners 2016–17
- Essex Senior League
  - Len Cordell Memorial Plate winners 2020–21
- Spartan League
  - Champions 1970–71, 1971–72
  - Division One champions 1935–36
  - Division Two B champions 1927–28
  - League Cup winners 1970–71
- South Midlands League
  - Challenge Trophy winners 1985–86, 1986–87, 1991–92
- Herts Senior Cup
  - Winners 1886–87, 1887–88, 1889–90
- Herts Charity Shield
  - Winners 1947–48, 1970–71, 1971–72, 1978–79, 2003–04
- Herts Senior Centenary Trophy
  - Winners 1986–87, 2007–08, 2008–09, 2023–24
- South Midlands Floodlight Cup
  - Winners 1989–90, 2001–02

== Records ==
- Best FA Cup performance: Third qualifying round, 1931–32, 1969–70, 2015–16
- Best FA Vase performance: Winners, 1974–75
- Record attendance: 3,500 vs West Ham United, friendly match, 7 March 1973

== See also ==
- Hoddesdon Town F.C. players
- Hoddesdon Town F.C. managers
