= List of Bishop's Stortford F.C. seasons =

Bishop's Stortford Football Club is a football club based in Bishop's Stortford, Hertfordshire, England. They are currently members of the Southern League Premier Division Central and play at Woodside Park.

== Early history ==
The club was established at the Chequers Hotel on 28 January 1874. In 1885 they were founders of the Hertfordshire County Football Association, and subsequently started playing in local leagues in the 1890s. In 1929 they joined the new Division Two East of the Spartan League, which they went on to win in 1931–32, earning promotion to Division One.

Following World War II, the league resumed in 1945, with Bishop's Stortford in the Eastern Division. Despite finishing in last place in 1945–46, they were placed in the Premier Division the following season. However, after finishing bottom of the Premier Division in 1948–49, they were relegated to Division One. In 1951 the club were founder members of the Delphian League.

== Key ==
Key to league record

- Level = Level of the league in the current league system
- Pld = Games played
- W = Games won
- D = Games drawn
- L = Games lost
- GF = Goals for
- GA = Goals against
- GD = Goals difference
- Pts = Points
- Position = Position in the final league table
- Top scorer and number of goals scored shown in bold when he was also top scorer for the division.

Key to cup records

- Res = Final reached round
- Rec = Final club record in the form of wins-draws-losses
- PR = Preliminary round
- QR1 (2, etc.) = Qualifying Cup rounds
- G = Group stage
- R1 (2, etc.) = Proper Cup rounds
- QF = Quarter-finalists
- SF = Semi-finalists
- F = Finalists
- A(QF, SF, F) = Area quarter-, semi-, finalists
- W = Winners

== Seasons ==
Year	League														Cup competitions				Manager
Year	Division	Lvl	Pld	W	D	L	GF	GA	GD	Pts	Position	Leading league scorer		Average attendance	FA Cup		FA Trophy		Manager
Year	Division	Lvl	Pld	W	D	L	GF	GA	GD	Pts	Position	Name	Goals	Average attendance	Res	Rec	Res	Rec	Manager
1951–52	**Delphian League**		26	10	3	13	55	80	-25	23	**10th of 14**				–		–		
1952–53	**Delphian League**		30	6	5	19	47	94	-47	17	**15th of 16**				–		–		
1953–54	**Delphian League**		28	12	4	12	64	56	8	28	**6th of 15**				–		–		
1954–55	**Delphian League**		28	22	3	3	98	39	59	47	**1st of 15**				PR	0–0–1	–		
1955–56	**Delphian League**		28	16	5	7	84	43	41	37	**4th of 15**				PR	0–0–1	–		
1956–57	**Delphian League**		26	13	3	10	70	56	14	29	**5th of 14**				QR2	2–0–1	–		
1957–58	**Delphian League**		28	12	6	10	62	54	8	30	**8th of 15**				PR	0–0–1	–		
1958–59	**Delphian League**		28	15	5	8	64	50	14	35	**5th of 15**				PR	0–0–1	–		
1959–60	**Delphian League**		24	14	3	7	52	35	17	31	**4th of 13**				QR2	0–0–1	–		
1960–61	**Delphian League**		28	14	2	12	67	63	4	30	**5th of 15**				QR3	2–0–1	–		
1961–62	**Delphian League**		26	14	6	6	62	36	26	34	**3rd of 14**				QR1	0–0–1	–		
1962–63	**Delphian League**		17	9	5	3	38	29	9	23	**2nd of 16**				QR2	1–0–1	–		
1962–63	**Delphian League**		The season was abandoned due to bad weather												QR2	1–0–1	–		
The league disbanded, club joined the Athenian League
1963–64	**Athenian League**; **Division Two**		28	14	3	11	67	40	27	31	**7th of 15**				QR1	0–0–1	–		
1964–65	**Athenian League**; **Division Two**		30	20	8	2	71	35	36	48	**2nd of 16**; Promoted				QR2	1–0–1	–		
1965–66	**Athenian League**; **Division One**		30	24	3	3	84	33	51	51	**1st of 16**; Promoted				QR1	0–1–1	–		
1966–67	**Athenian League**; **Premier Division**		30	19	5	6	56	33	23	43	**2nd of 16**				QR2	1–0–1	–		
1967–68	**Athenian League**; **Premier Division**		30	18	3	9	75	38	37	39	**3rd of 16**				QR3	2–0–1	–		
1968–69	**Athenian League**; **Premier Division**		30	14	6	10	57	44	13	34	**6th of 16**				QR3	2–0–1	–		
1969–70	**Athenian League**; **Premier Division**		30	20	5	5	72	33	39	45	**1st of 16**				QR1	0–0–1	–		
1970–71	**Athenian League**; **Premier Division**		30	11	4	15	45	61	-16	26	**12th of 16**				R1	4–1–1	–		
Club joined the Isthmian League
1971–72	**Isthmian League**	5	40	24	5	11	61	37	24	53	**5th of 21**				QR3	2–2–1	–		
1972–73	**Isthmian League**	5	42	18	12	12	58	51	7	48	**10th of 22**				R2	5–3–1	–		
Athenian League was absorbed into the league as Division Two
1973–74	**Isthmian League**; **Division One**	5	42	26	9	7	78	26	52	87	**3rd of 22**				QR4	0–1–1	–		
1974–75	**Isthmian League**; **Division One**	5	42	17	6	19	56	64	-8	57	**11th of 22**				R1	0–1–1	R1	1–2–1	
1975–76	**Isthmian League**; **Division One**	5	42	15	12	15	51	47	4	57	**12th of 22**				R2	2–0–1	R2	2–4–1	
1976–77	**Isthmian League**; **Division One**	5	42	11	11	20	51	71	-20	44	**20th of 22**				QR4	0–0–1	R1	1–0–1	
The Division renamed
1977–78	**Isthmian League**; **Premier Division**	5	42	7	8	27	36	83	-47	29	**22nd of 22**; Relegated				QR4	0–0–1	QR3	0–0–1	
1978–79	**Isthmian League**; **Division One**	6	42	22	11	9	68	40	28	77	**4th of 22**				QR1	0–0–1	QR3	0–0–1	
Alliance Premier League created, The Isthmian League clubs refused to join the new league
1979–80	**Isthmian League**; **Division One**	7	42	24	8	10	74	47	27	80	**4th of 22**				QR1	0–0–1	QR1	0–0–1	
1980–81	**Isthmian League**; **Division One**	7	42	30	6	6	84	28	56	96	**1st of 22**; Promoted				QR1	0–0–1	W	10–3–0	
1981–82	**Isthmian League**; **Premier Division**	6	42	15	5	22	50	70	-20	50	**15th of 22**				R1	0–1–1	QF	3–1–1	
1982–83	**Isthmian League**; **Premier Division**	6	42	17	9	16	61	58	3	60	**13th of 22**				R3	3–2–1	R1	0–0–1	
1983–84	**Isthmian League**; **Premier Division**	6	42	15	13	14	56	57	-1	58	**11th of 22**				QR4	0–0–1	R1	0–0–1	
1984–85	**Isthmian League**; **Premier Division**	6	42	12	12	18	48	67	-19	48	**16th of 22**				R1	1–0–1	R1	1–2–1	
1985–86	**Isthmian League**; **Premier Division**	6	42	17	10	15	55	61	-6	61	**7th of 22**				R1	1–1–1	R3	3–1–1	
1986–87	**Isthmian League**; **Premier Division**	6	42	15	15	12	62	57	5	60	**10th of 22**				R1	1–1–1	R2	1–0–1	Pat Ferry
1987–88	**Isthmian League**; **Premier Division**	6	42	15	10	17	55	58	-3	55	**13th of 22**				QR4	0–0–1	R2	1–0–1	John Radford
1988–89	**Isthmian League**; **Premier Division**	6	42	20	6	16	70	56	14	66	**7th of 22**				QR3	2–0–1	QR3	0–1–1	John Radford
1989–90	**Isthmian League**; **Premier Division**	6	42	19	6	17	60	59	1	63	**9th of 22**				QR1	0–0–1	QR1	0–1–1	
1990–91	**Isthmian League**; **Premier Division**	6	42	14	12	16	54	49	5	54	**13th of 22**				QR4	3–0–1	QR1	1–0–1	
1991–92	**Isthmian League**; **Premier Division**	6	42	7	12	23	41	68	-27	33	**22nd of 22**; Relegated				QR1	0–1–1	QR1	1–0–1	
1992–93	**Isthmian League**; **Division One**	7	40	19	10	11	63	42	21	67	**5th of 21**				QR1	1–0–1	QR1	0–0–1	
1993–94	**Isthmian League**; **Division One**	7	42	24	13	5	83	31	52	85	**1st of 22**; Promoted				QR3	3–0–1	QR2	1–0–1	
1994–95	**Isthmian League**; **Premier Division**	6	42	12	11	19	53	76	-23	47	**19th of 22**				QR1	0–1–1	QR1	0–0–1	
1995–96	**Isthmian League**; **Premier Division**	6	42	16	9	17	61	62	-1	57	**12th of 22**				QR1	0–1–1	QR2	1–1–1	
1996–97	**Isthmian League**; **Premier Division**	6	42	10	13	19	43	64	-21	43	**19th of 22**				QR2	1–0–1	QR2	1–0–1	
1997–98	**Isthmian League**; **Premier Division**	6	42	14	5	23	53	69	-16	47	**19th of 22**				QR1	0–0–1	QR3	1–0–1	
1998–99	**Isthmian League**; **Premier Division**	6	42	9	10	23	49	90	-41	37	**21st of 22**; Relegated				QR2	0–0–1	R1	0–0–1	
1999–2000	**Isthmian League**; **Division One**	7	42	16	10	16	57	62	-5	58	**11th of 22**				QR2	1–3–1	R1	0–0–1	
2000–01	**Isthmian League**; **Division One**	7	42	24	6	12	103	76	27	78	**4th of 22**				QR3	3–0–1	R1	0–0–1	
2001–02	**Isthmian League**; **Division One**	7	42	26	9	7	104	51	53	87	**2nd of 22**; Promoted			358	PR	0–1–1	R2	1–2–1	
2002–03	**Isthmian League**; **Premier Division**	6	46	16	11	19	74	72	2	59	**13th of 24**			389	QR4	2–1–1	R2	2–2–0	
2003–04	**Isthmian League**; **Premier Division**	6	46	20	9	17	78	61	17	69	**11th of 24**			358	R1	2–3–1	R3	2–1–1	
Conference South, a new sixth tier league created, club qualified to join it
2004–05	**Conference South**	6	42	17	8	17	70	66	4	59	**10th of 22**			352	QR2	0–0–1	SF	6–2–2	
2005–06	**Conference South**	6	42	11	15	16	55	63	-8	48	**15th of 22**			357	QR3	1–0–1	R1	1–1–1	
2006–07	**Conference South**	6	42	21	10	11	72	61	11	73	**5th of 22**			500	QR2	1–1–1	R2	2–0–1	
2007–08	**Conference South**	6	42	18	10	14	72	60	12	64	**10th of 22**			456	QR3	1–0–1	R2	2–1–1	
2008–09	**Conference South**	6	42	17	8	17	60	60	0	59	**9th of 22**			454	QR4	2–0–1	QR3	0–1–1	
2009–10	**Conference South**	6	42	12	11	19	48	59	-9	47	**18th of 22**			422	QR2	0–0–1	R1	1–0–1	
2010–11	**Conference South**	6	42	13	6	23	48	79	-31	45	**16th of 22**; Transferred			413	QR2	0–1–1	QR3	0–0–1	
2011–12	**Conference North**	6	42	17	7	18	70	70	-5	58	**10th of 22**			421	QR4	2–0–1	R1	1–1–1	Ian Walker
2012–13	**Conference North**	6	42	12	13	17	58	74	-16	49	**17th of 22**; Transferred			405	R1	3–1–1	R1	1–0–1	
2013–14	**Conference South**	6	42	13	13	16	63	68	-5	52	**15th of 22**			388	R1	3–0–1	QR3	0–0–1	
2014–15	**Conference South**	6	40	12	10	18	55	69	-14	46	**16th of 21**			389	QR2	0–1–1	R1	1–0–1	
Fifth and sixth tier divisions renamed
2015–16	**National League South**	6	42	15	10	17	56	63	-7	55	**11th of 22**			379	QR2	0–0–1	QR3	0–0–1	
2016–17	**National League South**	6	42	8	3	31	29	104	-75	27	**21st of 22**; Relegated			355	QR2	0–0–1	QR3	0–0–1	
2017–18	**Southern Football League**; **Premier Division**	7	46	14	10	22	74	79	-5	52	**18th of 24**; Transferred			298	QR1	0–0–1	QR2	1–0–1	Kevin Watson
2018–19	**Isthmian League**; **Premier Division**	7	42	20	7	15	70	57	13	67	**7th of 22**	Jamie Cureton	22	335	QR1	0–0–1	QR2	1–0–1	Jamie Cureton
2019–20	**Isthmian League**; **Premier Division**	7	32	8	4	20	37	63	-26	28	17th of 22	Jamie Cureton	16	253	QR2	1–0–1	QR1	0–1–1	Jamie Cureton
2019–20	**Isthmian League**; **Premier Division**	7	The season was declared null and void due to COVID-19												QR2	1–0–1	QR1	0–1–1	Jamie Cureton
2020–21	**Isthmian League**; **Premier Division**	7	6	4	2	0	13	5	8	14	7th of 22	Thomas Richardson; Peter Merrifield	5	– (Note: COVID-19 prevented fans from attending games)	R1	3–2–0	R1	1–0–1	Steve Smith
2020–21	**Isthmian League**; **Premier Division**	7	The season was declared null and void due to COVID-19												R1	3–2–0	R1	1–0–1	Steve Smith
2021–22	**Isthmian League**; **Premier Division**	7	42	25	12	5	89	33	56	87	**2nd of 22**	Jake Cass; Peter Merrifield	19	434	QR2	1–0–1	R3	3–1–0	Steve Smith
2021–22	**Isthmian League**; **Premier Division**	7	Lost in the play-off semi-final.												QR2	1–0–1	R3	3–1–0	Steve Smith
2022–23	**Isthmian League**; **Premier Division**	7	42	27	7	8	75	33	42	88	**1st of 22**; Promoted			485	QR1	0–0–1	R2	2–0–1	
2023–24	**National League North**	6	46	6	3	37	35	112	-77	21	**24th of 24**; Relegated	Tosin Olufemi; Ryan Charles	5	491	QR2	0–1–1	R5	2–1–1	Steve Smith; Steve Castle
2024–25	**Southern Football League**; **Premier Division Central**	7	42	14	9	19	52	62	-10	51	**15th of 22**	Bradley Russell	9	433	QR4	3–0–1	R1	0–1–1	Steve Castle

== Notes ==
- Source: Bishop's Stortford at the Football Club History Database
