= 1970–71 Athenian League =

Athenian League
- Season: 1970–71

The 1970–71 Athenian League season was the 48th in the history of Athenian League. The league consisted of 48 teams.

== Premier Division ==
Athenian League Premier Division
- Season: 1970–71
- Champions: Dagenham
- Promoted: Walton & Hersham; Hayes; Bishop's Stortford
- Relegated: None

The division featured two new teams, both promoted from last season's Division One:

- Lewes (1st)
- Boreham Wood (2nd)

=== League table ===
Pos	Team	Pld	W	D	L	GF	GA	GR	Pts	Promotion
1	Dagenham (C)	30	23	5	2	54	19	2.842	51	
2	Walton & Hersham (P)	30	20	7	3	56	21	2.667	47	Promotion to Isthmian League
3	Slough Town	30	17	7	6	48	21	2.286	41	
4	Cheshunt	30	18	3	9	48	34	1.412	39	
5	Maidenhead United	30	14	8	8	53	29	1.828	36	
6	Leatherhead	30	14	6	10	45	31	1.452	34	
7	Tilbury	30	13	4	13	48	44	1.091	30	
8	Hayes (P)	30	11	7	12	43	41	1.049	29	Promotion to Isthmian League
9	Lewes	30	11	6	13	42	42	1.000	28	
10	Boreham Wood	30	9	9	12	39	41	0.951	27	
11	Redhill	30	10	7	13	36	48	0.750	27	
12	Bishop's Stortford (P)	30	11	4	15	45	61	0.738	26	Promotion to Isthmian League
13	Harwich & Parkeston	30	8	6	16	43	62	0.694	22	
14	Wembley	30	4	8	18	33	62	0.532	16	
15	Grays Athletic	30	7	2	21	27	68	0.397	16	
16	Southall	30	4	3	23	17	53	0.321	11	

Source: rsssf.com
Rules for classification: 1) points; 2) goal ratio.
(C) Champions; (P) Promoted

=== Stadia and locations ===
Locations of the Athenian League Premier Division clubs
Greater London Athenian League Premier Division football clubs

Club	Stadium
Bishop's Stortford	Woodside Park
Boreham Wood	Meadow Park
Cheshunt	Cheshunt Stadium
Dagenham	Victoria Road
Grays Athletic	New Recreation Ground
Harwich & Parkeston	Royal Oak
Hayes	Church Road
Leatherhead	Fetcham Grove
Lewes	The Dripping Pan
Maidenhead United	York Road
Redhill	Kiln Brow
Slough Town	Wexham Park
Southall	Robert Parker Stadium
Tilbury	Chadfields
Walton & Hersham	The Sports Ground
Wembley	Vale Farm

== Division One ==
Athenian League Division One
- Season: 1970–71
- Champions: Aveley
- Promoted: Aveley; Erith & Belvedere; Hornchurch
- Relegated: None

The division featured 4 new teams:

- 2 relegated from last season's Premier Division:
  - Finchley (15th)
  - Eastbourne United (16th)
- 2 promoted from last season's Division Two:
  - Horsham (1st)
  - Edmonton (2nd)

=== League table ===
Pos	Team	Pld	W	D	L	GF	GA	GR	Pts	Promotion
1	Aveley (C, P)	30	18	8	4	59	24	2.458	44	Promotion to Premier Division
2	Erith & Belvedere (P)	30	19	6	5	67	34	1.971	44	Promotion to Premier Division
3	Hornchurch (P)	30	18	5	7	54	30	1.800	41	Promotion to Premier Division
4	Horsham	30	16	6	8	62	36	1.722	38	
5	Carshalton Athletic	30	15	6	9	51	35	1.457	36	
6	Hertford Town	30	12	10	8	55	42	1.310	34	
7	Wokingham Town	30	13	8	9	39	32	1.219	34	
8	Edmonton	30	15	3	12	50	54	0.926	33	
9	Dorking	30	11	9	10	36	40	0.900	31	
10	Aylesbury United	30	11	7	12	45	47	0.957	29	
11	Finchley	30	8	12	10	29	33	0.879	28	
12	Harlow Town	30	6	9	15	35	54	0.648	21	
13	Chesham United	30	7	5	18	37	57	0.649	19	
14	Letchworth Town	30	7	4	19	30	62	0.484	18	
15	Eastbourne United	30	5	6	19	26	57	0.456	16	
16	Hounslow	30	4	6	20	25	63	0.397	14	

Source: rsssf.com
Rules for classification: 1) points; 2) goal ratio.
(C) Champions; (P) Promoted

=== Stadia and locations ===
Locations of the Athenian League Division One clubs
Greater London Athenian League Division One football clubs

Club	Stadium
Aveley	The Mill Field
Aylesbury United	Buckingham Road
Carshalton Athletic	War Memorial Sports Ground
Chesham United	The Meadow
Dorking	Meadowbank Stadium
Eastbourne United	The Oval
Erith & Belvedere	Park View
Finchley	Summers Lane
Edmonton	Coles Park
Harlow Town	Harlow Sportcentre
Hertford Town	Hertingfordbury Park
Hornchurch	Hornchurch Stadium
Horsham	Queen Street
Hounslow	Denbigh Road
Letchworth Town	Baldock Road
Wokingham Town	Cantley Park

== Division Two ==
Athenian League Division Two
- Season: 1970–71
- Champions: Herne Bay
- Promoted: Herne Bay; Croydon Amateurs; Marlow
- Relegated: None

The division featured 2 new teams, all relegated from last season's Division One:

- Ware (15th)
- Croydon Amateurs (16th)

=== League table ===
Pos	Team	Pld	W	D	L	GF	GA	GR	Pts	Promotion
1	Herne Bay (C, P)	30	22	3	5	76	38	2.000	47	Promotion to Division One
2	Croydon Amateurs (P)	30	20	4	6	78	24	3.250	44	Promotion to Division One
3	Marlow (P)	30	18	7	5	54	29	1.862	43	Promotion to Division One
4	Windsor & Eton	30	14	7	9	52	39	1.333	35	
5	Worthing	30	14	6	10	49	35	1.400	34	
6	Ware	30	13	6	11	53	46	1.152	32	
7	Uxbridge	30	14	4	12	54	50	1.080	32	
8	Eastbourne	30	12	5	13	41	42	0.976	29	
9	Rainham Town	30	9	8	13	39	46	0.848	26	
10	Ruislip Manor	30	10	6	14	29	37	0.784	26	
11	Edgware Town	30	9	8	13	44	58	0.759	26	
12	Harrow Borough	30	8	9	13	32	39	0.821	25	
13	Hemel Hempstead Town	30	9	7	14	43	56	0.768	25	
14	Wingate	30	9	6	15	36	57	0.632	24	
15	Leyton	30	9	4	17	40	61	0.656	22	
16	Epsom & Ewell	30	3	4	23	23	86	0.267	10	

Source: rsssf.com
Rules for classification: 1) points; 2) goal ratio.
(C) Champions; (P) Promoted

=== Stadia and locations ===
Locations of the Athenian League Division Two clubs
Greater London Athenian League Division Two football clubs

Club	Stadium
Croydon Amateurs	Croydon Sports Arena
Eastbourne Town	The Saffrons
Edgware	White Lion
Epsom & Ewell	Merland Rise
Harrow Borough	Earlsmead Stadium
Hemel Hempstead	Vauxhall Road
Herne Bay	Winch's Field
Leyton	Leyton Stadium
Marlow	Alfred Davis Memorial Ground
Rainham Town	Deri Park
Ruislip Manor	Grosvenor Vale
Uxbridge	Honeycroft
Ware	Wodson Park
Windsor & Eton	Stag Meadow
Wingate	Hall Lane
Worthing	Woodside Road
