= 1968–69 Athenian League =

Athenian League
- Season: 1968–69

The 1968–69 Athenian League season was the 46th in the history of Athenian League. The league consisted of 48 teams.

== Premier Division ==
Athenian League Premier Division
- Season: 1968–69
- Champions: Walton & Hersham
- Promoted: None
- Relegated: Hornchurch; Hounslow

The division featured two new teams, both promoted from last season's Division One:

- Cheshunt (1st)
- Wembley (2nd)

=== League table ===
Pos	Team	Pld	W	D	L	GF	GA	GR	Pts	Relegation
1	Walton & Hersham (C)	30	24	4	2	79	22	3.591	52	
2	Slough Town	30	21	6	3	65	30	2.167	48	
3	Southall	30	18	3	9	55	31	1.774	39	
4	Leatherhead	30	16	6	8	48	32	1.500	38	
5	Dagenham	30	15	7	8	51	34	1.500	37	
6	Bishop's Stortford	30	14	6	10	57	44	1.295	34	
7	Maidenhead United	30	10	11	9	42	35	1.200	31	
8	Cheshunt	30	10	9	11	33	39	0.846	29	
9	Wembley	30	11	7	12	35	45	0.778	29	
10	Harwich & Parkeston	30	9	7	14	33	47	0.702	25	
11	Redhill	30	10	5	15	31	51	0.608	25	
12	Hayes	30	7	10	13	31	45	0.689	24	
13	Grays Athletic	30	7	7	16	34	48	0.708	21	
14	Finchley	30	5	10	15	19	39	0.487	20	
15	Hornchurch (R)	30	3	10	17	23	53	0.434	16	Relegation to Division One
16	Hounslow (R)	30	5	2	23	26	67	0.388	12	Relegation to Division One

Source: rsssf.com
Rules for classification: 1) points; 2) goal ratio.
(C) Champions; (R) Relegated

=== Stadia and locations ===
Locations of the Athenian League Premier Division clubs
Greater London Athenian League Premier Division football clubs

Club	Stadium
Bishop's Stortford	Woodside Park
Cheshunt	Cheshunt Stadium
Dagenham	Victoria Road
Finchley	Summers Lane
Grays Athletic	New Recreation Ground
Harwich & Parkeston	Royal Oak
Hayes	Church Road
Hornchurch	Hornchurch Stadium
Hounslow	Denbigh Road
Leatherhead	Fetcham Grove
Maidenhead United	York Road
Redhill	Kiln Brow
Slough Town	Wexham Park
Southall	Robert Parker Stadium
Walton & Hersham	The Sports Ground
Wembley	Vale Farm

== Division One ==
Athenian League Division One
- Season: 1968–69
- Champions: Tilbury
- Promoted: Tilbury; Eastbourne United
- Relegated: Hemel Hempstead Town; Leyton

The division featured 4 new teams:

- 2 relegated from last season's Premier Division:
  - Leyton (15th)
  - Hemel Hempstead Town (16th)
- 2 promoted from last season's Division Two:
  - Lewes (1st)
  - Aylesbury United (2nd)

=== League table ===
Pos	Team	Pld	W	D	L	GF	GA	GR	Pts	Promotion or relegation
1	Tilbury (C, P)	30	20	5	5	65	28	2.321	45	Promotion to Premier Division
2	Eastbourne United (P)	30	19	6	5	70	40	1.750	44	Promotion to Premier Division
3	Lewes	30	15	9	6	57	39	1.462	39	
4	Hertford Town	30	16	6	8	48	28	1.714	38	
5	Wokingham Town	30	12	11	7	44	28	1.571	35	
6	Dorking	30	13	7	10	54	51	1.059	33	
7	Erith & Belvedere	30	9	13	8	48	48	1.000	31	
8	Carshalton Athletic	30	11	8	11	47	40	1.175	30	
9	Harlow Town	30	12	4	14	47	49	0.959	28	
10	Croydon Amateurs	30	7	12	11	39	45	0.867	26	
11	Aylesbury United	30	8	10	12	45	64	0.703	26	
12	Chesham United	30	8	9	13	44	42	1.048	25	
13	Letchworth Town	30	8	8	14	41	56	0.732	24	
14	Ware	30	8	6	16	44	69	0.638	22	
15	Hemel Hempstead Town (R)	30	6	6	18	32	67	0.478	18	Relegation to Division Two
16	Leyton (R)	30	5	6	19	37	68	0.544	16	Relegation to Division Two

Source: rsssf.com
Rules for classification: 1) points; 2) goal ratio.
(C) Champions; (P) Promoted; (R) Relegated

=== Stadia and locations ===
Locations of the Athenian League Division One clubs
Greater London Athenian League Division One football clubs

Club	Stadium
Aylesbury United	Buckingham Road
Carshalton Athletic	War Memorial Sports Ground
Chesham United	The Meadow
Croydon Amateurs	Croydon Sports Arena
Dorking	Meadowbank Stadium
Eastbourne United	The Oval
Erith & Belvedere	Park View
Harlow Town	Harlow Sportcentre
Hemel Hempstead	Vauxhall Road
Hertford Town	Hertingfordbury Park
Letchworth Town	Baldock Road
Lewes	The Dripping Pan
Leyton	Leyton Stadium
Tilbury	Chadfields
Ware	Wodson Park
Wokingham Town	Cantley Park

== Division Two ==
Athenian League Division Two
- Season: 1968–69
- Champions: Boreham Wood
- Promoted: Boreham Wood; Aveley
- Relegated: None

The division featured 2 new teams, all relegated from last season's Division One:

- Worthing (15th)
- Edgware Town (16th)

=== League table ===
Pos	Team	Pld	W	D	L	GF	GA	GR	Pts	Promotion
1	Boreham Wood (C, P)	30	20	6	4	68	25	2.720	46	Promotion to Division One
2	Aveley (P)	30	20	6	4	77	32	2.406	46	Promotion to Division One
3	Eastbourne	30	17	8	5	60	33	1.818	42	
4	Herne Bay	30	15	10	5	60	34	1.765	40	
5	Horsham	30	17	4	9	63	38	1.658	38	
6	Edmonton	30	16	2	12	48	42	1.143	34	
7	Worthing	30	15	4	11	51	51	1.000	34	
8	Marlow	30	11	11	8	45	36	1.250	33	
9	Wingate	30	12	5	13	45	41	1.098	29	
10	Windsor & Eton	30	11	7	12	35	46	0.761	29	
11	Uxbridge	30	10	7	13	45	58	0.776	27	
12	Ruislip Manor	30	6	6	18	40	65	0.615	18	
13	Edgware Town	30	7	4	19	30	61	0.492	18	
14	Epsom & Ewell	30	5	7	18	25	63	0.397	17	
15	Rainham Town	30	5	6	19	37	64	0.578	16	
16	Harrow Borough	30	5	3	22	45	85	0.529	13	

Source: rsssf.com
Rules for classification: 1) points; 2) goal ratio.
(C) Champions; (P) Promoted

=== Stadia and locations ===
Locations of the Athenian League Division Two clubs
Greater London Athenian League Division Two football clubs

Club	Stadium
Aveley	The Mill Field
Boreham Wood	Meadow Park
Eastbourne Town	The Saffrons
Edgware	White Lion
Edmonton	Coles Park
Epsom & Ewell	Merland Rise
Harrow Borough	Earlsmead Stadium
Herne Bay	Winch's Field
Horsham	Queen Street
Marlow	Alfred Davis Memorial Ground
Rainham Town	Deri Park
Ruislip Manor	Grosvenor Vale
Uxbridge	Honeycroft
Windsor & Eton	Stag Meadow
Wingate	Hall Lane
Worthing	Woodside Road
