= 1966–67 Athenian League =

Athenian League
- Season: 1966–67

The 1966–67 Athenian League season was the 44th in the history of Athenian League. The league consisted of 48 teams.

== Premier Division ==
Athenian League Premier Division
- Season: 1966–67
- Champions: Leyton
- Promoted: None
- Relegated: Worthing; Edgware Town

The division featured two new teams, both promoted from last season's Division One:

- Bishop's Stortford (1st)
- Harwich & Parkeston (2nd)

=== League table ===
Pos	Team	Pld	W	D	L	GF	GA	GR	Pts	Relegation
1	Leyton (C)	30	18	7	5	73	32	2.281	43	
2	Bishop's Stortford	30	19	5	6	56	33	1.697	43	
3	Finchley	30	16	6	8	72	38	1.895	38	
4	Leatherhead	30	17	3	10	53	42	1.262	37	
5	Harwich & Parkeston	30	15	5	10	64	42	1.524	35	
6	Hounslow	30	14	6	10	62	49	1.265	34	
7	Slough Town	30	14	5	11	52	38	1.368	33	
8	Dagenham	30	13	7	10	48	40	1.200	33	
9	Hayes	30	13	6	11	51	45	1.133	32	
10	Grays Athletic	30	11	7	12	45	50	0.900	29	
11	Hemel Hempstead Town	30	8	11	11	39	42	0.929	27	
12	Southall	30	8	9	13	43	47	0.915	25	
13	Walton & Hersham	30	10	5	15	46	58	0.793	25	
14	Maidenhead United	30	7	10	13	49	65	0.754	24	
15	Worthing (R)	30	5	4	21	32	85	0.376	14	Relegation to Division One
16	Edgware Town (R)	30	2	4	24	19	98	0.194	8	Relegation to Division One

Source: rsssf.com
Rules for classification: 1) points; 2) goal ratio.
(C) Champions; (R) Relegated

=== Stadia and locations ===
Locations of the Athenian League Premier Division clubs
Greater London Athenian League Premier Division football clubs

Club	Stadium
Bishop's Stortford	Woodside Park
Dagenham	Victoria Road
Edgware Town	White Lion
Finchley	Summers Lane
Grays Athletic	New Recreation Ground
Harwich & Parkeston	Royal Oak
Hayes	Church Road
Hemel Hempstead	Vauxhall Road
Hounslow	Denbigh Road
Leatherhead	Fetcham Grove
Leyton	Leyton Stadium
Maidenhead United	York Road
Slough Town	Wexham Park
Southall	Robert Parker Stadium
Walton & Hersham	The Sports Ground
Worthing	Woodside Road

== Division One ==
Athenian League Division One
- Season: 1966–67
- Champions: Hornchurch
- Promoted: Hornchurch; Redhill
- Relegated: Uxbridge; Harrow Town

The division featured 4 new teams:

- 2 relegated from last season's Premier Division:
  - Carshalton Athletic (15th)
  - Hornchurch (16th)
- 2 promoted from last season's Division Two:
  - Croydon Amateurs (1st)
  - Cheshunt (2nd)

=== League table ===
Pos	Team	Pld	W	D	L	GF	GA	GR	Pts	Promotion or relegation
1	Hornchurch (C, P)	30	20	6	4	51	24	2.125	46	Promotion to Premier Division
2	Redhill (P)	30	19	7	4	71	32	2.219	45	Promotion to Premier Division
3	Chesham United	30	17	5	8	57	34	1.676	39	
4	Wembley	30	15	5	10	49	40	1.225	35	
5	Croydon Amateurs	30	17	0	13	71	48	1.479	34	
6	Erith & Belvedere	30	12	6	12	54	41	1.317	30	
7	Hertford Town	30	13	4	13	41	42	0.976	30	
8	Letchworth Town	30	12	5	13	70	64	1.094	29	
9	Harlow Town	30	10	8	12	39	42	0.929	28	
10	Carshalton Athletic	30	11	6	13	43	49	0.878	28	
11	Tilbury	30	11	5	14	63	64	0.984	27	
12	Cheshunt	30	9	7	14	41	45	0.911	25	
13	Dorking	30	10	5	15	42	60	0.700	25	
14	Wokingham Town	30	10	3	17	47	66	0.712	23	
15	Uxbridge (R)	30	9	5	16	35	72	0.486	23	Relegation to Division Two
16	Harrow Town (R)	30	5	3	22	37	88	0.420	13	Relegation to Division Two

Source: rsssf.com
Rules for classification: 1) points; 2) goal ratio.
(C) Champions; (P) Promoted; (R) Relegated

=== Stadia and locations ===
Locations of the Athenian League Division One clubs
Greater London Athenian League Division One football clubs

Club	Stadium
Carshalton Athletic	War Memorial Sports Ground
Chesham United	The Meadow
Cheshunt	Cheshunt Stadium
Croydon Amateurs	Croydon Sports Arena
Dorking	Meadowbank Stadium
Erith & Belvedere	Park View
Harlow Town	Harlow Sportcentre
Harrow Town	Earlsmead Stadium
Hornchurch	Hornchurch Stadium
Hertford Town	Hertingfordbury Park
Letchworth Town	Baldock Road
Redhill	Kiln Brow
Tilbury	Chadfields
Uxbridge	Honeycroft
Wembley	Vale Farm
Wokingham Town	Cantley Park

== Division Two ==
Athenian League Division Two
- Season: 1966–67
- Champions: Eastbourne United
- Promoted: Eastbourne United; Ware
- Relegated: None

The division featured 3 new teams:

- 2 relegated from last season's Division One:
  - Horsham (15th)
  - Eastbourne (16th)
- 1 joined the division:
  - Boreham Wood, from Spartan League

=== League table ===
Pos	Team	Pld	W	D	L	GF	GA	GR	Pts	Promotion
1	Eastbourne United (C, P)	30	22	6	2	83	25	3.320	50	Promotion to Division One
2	Ware (P)	30	19	8	3	79	38	2.079	46	Promotion to Division One
3	Horsham	30	20	3	7	59	32	1.844	43	
4	Marlow	30	16	5	9	57	58	0.983	37	
5	Lewes	30	14	8	8	62	37	1.676	36	
6	Aveley	30	14	4	12	49	51	0.961	32	
7	Windsor & Eton	30	11	7	12	47	54	0.870	29	
8	Herne Bay	30	12	4	14	64	57	1.123	28	
9	Boreham Wood	30	8	9	13	56	59	0.949	25	
10	Aylesbury United	30	11	3	16	46	59	0.780	25	
11	Rainham Town	30	7	10	13	40	50	0.800	24	
12	Epsom & Ewell	30	9	6	15	65	91	0.714	24	
13	Eastbourne	30	9	5	16	51	61	0.836	23	
14	Ruislip Manor	30	9	4	17	48	71	0.676	22	
15	Edmonton	30	6	9	15	25	48	0.521	21	
16	Wingate	30	5	5	20	34	74	0.459	15	

Source: rsssf.com
Rules for classification: 1) points; 2) goal ratio.
(C) Champions; (P) Promoted

=== Stadia and locations ===
Locations of the Athenian League Division Two clubs
Greater London Athenian League Division Two football clubs

Club	Stadium
Aveley	The Mill Field
Aylesbury United	Buckingham Road
Boreham Wood	Meadow Park
Eastbourne	The Saffrons
Eastbourne United	The Oval
Edmonton	Coles Park
Epsom & Ewell	Merland Rise
Herne Bay	Winch's Field
Horsham	Queen Street
Lewes	The Dripping Pan
Marlow	Alfred Davis Memorial Ground
Rainham Town	Deri Park
Ruislip Manor	Grosvenor Vale
Ware	Wodson Park
Windsor & Eton	Stag Meadow
Wingate	Hall Lane
