= 1967–68 Athenian League =

Athenian League
- Season: 1967–68

The 1967–68 Athenian League season was the 45th in the history of Athenian League. The league consisted of 48 teams.

== Premier Division ==
Athenian League Premier Division
- Season: 1967–68
- Champions: Slough Town
- Promoted: None
- Relegated: Leyton; Hemel Hempstead Town

The division featured two new teams, both promoted from last season's Division One:

- Hornchurch (1st)
- Redhill (2nd)

=== League table ===
Pos	Team	Pld	W	D	L	GF	GA	GR	Pts	Relegation
1	Slough Town (C)	30	23	5	2	93	23	4.043	51	
2	Dagenham	30	20	4	6	73	34	2.147	44	
3	Bishop's Stortford	30	18	3	9	75	38	1.974	39	
4	Hayes	30	15	5	10	57	40	1.425	35	
5	Leatherhead	30	15	4	11	55	44	1.250	34	
6	Maidenhead United	30	15	4	11	50	48	1.042	34	
7	Hounslow	30	13	6	11	50	50	1.000	32	
8	Walton & Hersham	30	13	5	12	51	39	1.308	31	
9	Hornchurch	30	10	9	11	42	46	0.913	29	
10	Redhill	30	11	7	12	43	48	0.896	29	
11	Grays Athletic	30	11	6	13	45	54	0.833	28	
12	Southall	30	9	8	13	34	65	0.523	26	
13	Finchley	30	6	9	15	42	53	0.792	21	
14	Harwich & Parkeston	30	7	5	18	36	60	0.600	19	
15	Leyton (R)	30	5	6	19	22	63	0.349	16	Relegation to Division One
16	Hemel Hempstead Town (R)	30	4	4	22	23	86	0.267	12	Relegation to Division One

Source: rsssf.com
Rules for classification: 1) points; 2) goal ratio.
(C) Champions; (R) Relegated

=== Stadia and locations ===
Locations of the Athenian League Premier Division clubs
Greater London Athenian League Premier Division football clubs

Club	Stadium
Bishop's Stortford	Woodside Park
Dagenham	Victoria Road
Finchley	Summers Lane
Grays Athletic	New Recreation Ground
Harwich & Parkeston	Royal Oak
Hayes	Church Road
Hemel Hempstead	Vauxhall Road
Hornchurch	Hornchurch Stadium
Hounslow	Denbigh Road
Leatherhead	Fetcham Grove
Leyton	Leyton Stadium
Maidenhead United	York Road
Redhill	Kiln Brow
Slough Town	Wexham Park
Southall	Robert Parker Stadium
Walton & Hersham	The Sports Ground

== Division One ==
Athenian League Division One
- Season: 1967–68
- Champions: Cheshunt
- Promoted: Cheshunt; Wembley
- Relegated: Worthing; Edgware Town

The division featured 4 new teams:

- 2 relegated from last season's Premier Division:
  - Worthing (15th)
  - Edgware Town (16th)
- 2 promoted from last season's Division Two:
  - Eastbourne United (1st)
  - Ware (2nd)

=== League table ===
Pos	Team	Pld	W	D	L	GF	GA	GR	Pts	Promotion or relegation
1	Cheshunt (C, P)	30	18	6	6	59	30	1.967	42	Promotion to Premier Division
2	Wembley (P)	30	16	8	6	67	37	1.811	40	Promotion to Premier Division
3	Tilbury	30	16	6	8	58	35	1.657	38	
4	Erith & Belvedere	30	14	9	7	55	41	1.341	37	
5	Hertford Town	30	15	7	8	49	38	1.289	37	
6	Croydon Amateurs	30	11	14	5	47	27	1.741	36	
7	Carshalton Athletic	30	15	6	9	54	38	1.421	36	
8	Dorking	30	13	6	11	37	31	1.194	32	
9	Ware	30	12	6	12	42	49	0.857	30	
10	Eastbourne United	30	11	6	13	44	47	0.936	28	
11	Chesham United	30	8	12	10	33	38	0.868	28	
12	Wokingham Town	30	11	5	14	53	70	0.757	27	
13	Letchworth Town	30	11	3	16	50	52	0.962	25	
14	Harlow Town	30	6	7	17	33	59	0.559	19	
15	Worthing (R)	30	6	5	19	35	58	0.603	17	Relegation to Division Two
16	Edgware Town (R)	30	1	6	23	11	77	0.143	8	Relegation to Division Two

Source: rsssf.com
Rules for classification: 1) points; 2) goal ratio.
(C) Champions; (P) Promoted; (R) Relegated

=== Stadia and locations ===
Locations of the Athenian League Division One clubs
Greater London Athenian League Division One football clubs

Club	Stadium
Carshalton Athletic	War Memorial Sports Ground
Chesham United	The Meadow
Cheshunt	Cheshunt Stadium
Croydon Amateurs	Croydon Sports Arena
Dorking	Meadowbank Stadium
Eastbourne United	The Oval
Edgware Town	White Lion
Erith & Belvedere	Park View
Harlow Town	Harlow Sportcentre
Hertford Town	Hertingfordbury Park
Letchworth Town	Baldock Road
Tilbury	Chadfields
Ware	Wodson Park
Wembley	Vale Farm
Wokingham Town	Cantley Park
Worthing	Woodside Road

== Division Two ==
Athenian League Division Two
- Season: 1967–68
- Champions: Lewes
- Promoted: Lewes; Aylesbury United
- Relegated: None

The division featured two new teams, both relegated from last season's Division One:

- Uxbridge (15th)
- Harrow Borough (16th)

=== League table ===
Pos	Team	Pld	W	D	L	GF	GA	GR	Pts	Promotion
1	Lewes (C, P)	30	21	4	5	89	22	4.045	46	Promotion to Division One
2	Aylesbury United (P)	30	18	6	6	62	35	1.771	42	Promotion to Division One
3	Horsham	30	16	6	8	61	36	1.694	38	
4	Edmonton	30	17	2	11	73	49	1.490	36	
5	Boreham Wood	30	15	4	11	63	38	1.658	34	
6	Windsor & Eton	30	14	6	10	46	38	1.211	34	
7	Rainham Town	30	12	7	11	55	54	1.019	31	
8	Marlow	30	14	2	14	54	54	1.000	30	
9	Ruislip Manor	30	11	8	11	41	50	0.820	30	
10	Harrow Borough	30	12	6	12	41	49	0.837	30	
11	Aveley	30	12	5	13	54	53	1.019	29	
12	Herne Bay	30	13	2	15	49	50	0.980	28	
13	Uxbridge	30	9	5	16	41	60	0.683	23	
14	Epsom & Ewell	30	10	3	17	44	66	0.667	23	
15	Eastbourne	30	5	3	22	37	94	0.394	13	
16	Wingate	30	5	3	22	23	85	0.271	13	

Source: rsssf.com
Rules for classification: 1) points; 2) goal ratio.
(C) Champions; (P) Promoted

=== Stadia and locations ===
Locations of the Athenian League Division Two clubs
Greater London Athenian League Division Two football clubs

Club	Stadium
Aveley	The Mill Field
Aylesbury United	Buckingham Road
Boreham Wood	Meadow Park
Eastbourne Town	The Saffrons
Edmonton	Coles Park
Epsom & Ewell	Merland Rise
Harrow Borough	Earlsmead Stadium
Herne Bay	Winch's Field
Horsham	Queen Street
Lewes	The Dripping Pan
Marlow	Alfred Davis Memorial Ground
Rainham Town	Deri Park
Ruislip Manor	Grosvenor Vale
Uxbridge	Honeycroft
Windsor & Eton	Stag Meadow
Wingate	Hall Lane
