= 1965–66 Athenian League =

Athenian League
- Season: 1965–66

The 1965–66 Athenian League season was the 43rd in the history of Athenian League. The league consisted of 48 teams.

== Premier Division ==
Athenian League Premier Division
- Season: 1965–66
- Champions: Leyton
- Promoted: None
- Relegated: Carshalton Athletic; Hornchurch

The division featured two new teams, both promoted from last seasons Division One:

- Slough Town (1.)
- Hemel Hempstead Town (2.)

=== League table ===
Pos	Team	Pld	W	D	L	GF	GA	GR	Pts	Relegation
1	Leyton (C)	30	21	6	3	76	28	2.714	48	
2	Finchley	30	22	4	4	83	39	2.128	48	
3	Maidenhead United	30	21	3	6	63	29	2.172	45	
4	Leatherhead	30	14	9	7	41	34	1.206	37	
5	Hounslow Town	30	15	4	11	66	60	1.100	34	
6	Dagenham	30	14	4	12	61	49	1.245	32	
7	Southall	30	13	4	13	38	57	0.667	30	
8	Slough Town	30	12	5	13	69	50	1.380	29	
9	Hemel Hempstead Town	30	11	6	13	57	51	1.118	28	
10	Grays Athletic	30	8	10	12	41	54	0.759	26	
11	Walton & Hersham	30	9	6	15	56	66	0.848	24	
12	Worthing	30	10	4	16	51	66	0.773	24	
13	Hayes	30	9	5	16	50	55	0.909	23	
14	Edgware Town	30	8	7	15	37	62	0.597	23	
15	Carshalton Athletic (R)	30	7	2	21	48	93	0.516	16	Relegation to Division One
16	Hornchurch (R)	30	3	7	20	34	78	0.436	13	Relegation to Division One

Source: rsssf.com
Rules for classification: 1) points; 2) goal ratio.
(C) Champions; (R) Relegated

=== Stadia and locations ===
Locations of the Athenian League Premier Division clubs
Greater London Athenian League Premier Division football clubs

Club	Stadium
Carshalton Athletic	War Memorial Sports Ground
Dagenham	Victoria Road
Edgware Town	White Lion
Finchley	Summers Lane
Grays Athletic	New Recreation Ground
Hayes	Church Road
Hemel Hempstead	Vauxhall Road
Hornchurch	Hornchurch Stadium
Hounslow	Denbigh Road
Leatherhead	Fetcham Grove
Leyton	Leyton Stadium
Maidenhead United	York Road
Slough Town	Wexham Park
Southall	Robert Parker Stadium
Walton & Hersham	The Sports Ground
Worthing	Woodside Road

== Division One ==
Athenian League Division One
- Season: 1965–66
- Champions: Bishop's Stortford
- Promoted: Bishop's Stortford; Harwich & Parkeston
- Relegated: Horsham; Eastbourne

The division featured 3 new teams:

- 1 relegated from last seasons Premier Division:
  - Redhill (16.)
- 2 promoted from last seasons Division Two:
  - Harwich & Parkeston (1.)
  - Bishop's Stortford (2.)

=== League table ===
Pos	Team	Pld	W	D	L	GF	GA	GR	Pts	Promotion or relegation
1	Bishop's Stortford (C, P)	30	24	3	3	84	33	2.545	51	Promotion to Premier Division
2	Harwich & Parkeston (P)	30	23	0	7	66	36	1.833	46	Promotion to Premier Division
3	Hertford Town	30	17	7	6	58	26	2.231	41	
4	Letchworth Town	30	17	7	6	80	49	1.633	41	
5	Wembley	30	15	7	8	56	48	1.167	37	
6	Chesham United	30	15	4	11	74	52	1.423	34	
7	Erith & Belvedere	30	13	8	9	55	44	1.250	34	
8	Redhill	30	16	0	14	56	44	1.273	32	
9	Harlow Town	30	11	7	12	53	55	0.964	29	
10	Tilbury	30	10	4	16	58	66	0.879	24	
11	Dorking	30	11	1	18	50	75	0.667	23	
12	Uxbridge	30	7	6	17	49	65	0.754	20	
13	Wokingham Town	30	7	5	18	37	74	0.500	19	
14	Harrow Town	30	7	5	18	32	71	0.451	19	
15	Horsham (R)	30	5	5	20	50	84	0.595	15	Relegation to Division Two
16	Eastbourne (R)	30	6	3	21	45	81	0.556	15	Relegation to Division Two

Source: rsssf.com
Rules for classification: 1) points; 2) goal ratio.
(C) Champions; (P) Promoted; (R) Relegated

=== Stadia and locations ===
Locations of the Athenian League Division One clubs
Greater London Athenian League Division One football clubs

Club	Stadium
Bishop's Stortford	Woodside Park
Chesham United	The Meadow
Dorking	Meadowbank Stadium
Eastbourne	The Saffrons
Erith & Belvedere	Park View
Harlow Town	Harlow Sportcentre
Harrow Town	Earlsmead Stadium
Harwich & Parkeston	Royal Oak
Hertford Town	Hertingfordbury Park
Horsham	Queen Street
Letchworth Town	Baldock Road
Redhill	Kiln Brow
Tilbury	Chadfields
Uxbridge	Honeycroft
Wembley	Vale Farm
Wokingham Town	Cantley Park

== Division Two ==
Athenian League Division Two
- Season: 1965–66
- Champions: Croydon Amateurs
- Promoted: Croydon Amateurs; Cheshunt
- Relegated: None

The division featured 4 new teams:

- 1 relegated from last seasons Division One:
  - Epsom & Ewell (16.)
- 3 joined the division:
  - Lewes, from Sussex County League
  - Marlow, from Spartan League
  - Ruislip Manor, from Spartan League

=== League table ===
Pos	Team	Pld	W	D	L	GF	GA	GR	Pts	Promotion
1	Croydon Amateurs (C, P)	30	21	5	4	85	37	2.297	47	Promotion to Division One
2	Cheshunt (P)	30	22	3	5	82	38	2.158	47	Promotion to Division One
3	Eastbourne United	30	19	3	8	83	46	1.804	41	
4	Lewes	30	17	6	7	66	42	1.571	40	
5	Herne Bay	30	18	3	9	74	45	1.644	39	
6	Windsor & Eton	30	16	4	10	79	49	1.612	36	
7	Aveley	30	15	6	9	68	44	1.545	36	
8	Ware	30	15	5	10	77	71	1.085	35	
9	Epsom & Ewell	30	12	7	11	57	49	1.163	31	
10	Rainham Town	30	10	7	13	58	65	0.892	27	
11	Edmonton	30	8	6	16	43	71	0.606	22	
12	Berkhamsted Town	30	7	4	19	51	80	0.638	18	Left to join Spartan League
13	Marlow	30	5	7	18	41	79	0.519	17	
14	Wingate	30	6	4	20	47	84	0.560	16	
15	Aylesbury United	30	5	5	20	45	89	0.506	15	
16	Ruislip Manor	30	5	3	22	37	104	0.356	13	

Source: rsssf.com
Rules for classification: 1) points; 2) goal ratio.
(C) Champions; (P) Promoted

=== Stadia and locations ===
Locations of the Athenian League Division Two clubs
Greater London Athenian League Division Two football clubs

Club	Stadium
Aveley	The Mill Field
Aylesbury United	Buckingham Road
Berkhamsted Town	Broadwater
Cheshunt	Cheshunt Stadium
Croydon Amateurs	Croydon Sports Arena
Eastbourne United	The Oval
Edmonton	Coles Park
Epsom & Ewell	Merland Rise
Herne Bay	Winch's Field
Lewes	The Dripping Pan
Marlow	Alfred Davis Memorial Ground
Rainham Town	Deri Park
Ruislip Manor	Grosvenor Vale
Ware	Wodson Park
Windsor & Eton	Stag Meadow
Wingate	Hall Lane
