= 1969–70 Athenian League =

Athenian League
- Season: 1969–70

The 1969–70 Athenian League season was the 47th in the history of Athenian League. The league consisted of 48 teams.

== Premier Division ==
Athenian League Premier Division
- Season: 1969–70
- Champions: Bishop's Stortford
- Promoted: None
- Relegated: Finchley; Eastbourne United

The division featured two new teams, both promoted from last season's Division One:

- Tilbury (1st)
- Eastbourne United (2nd)

=== League table ===
Pos	Team	Pld	W	D	L	GF	GA	GR	Pts	Relegation
1	Bishop's Stortford (C)	30	20	5	5	72	33	2.182	45	
2	Walton & Hersham	30	16	8	6	56	32	1.750	40	
3	Dagenham	30	15	9	6	62	22	2.818	39	
4	Slough Town	30	15	9	6	52	21	2.476	39	
5	Leatherhead	30	15	9	6	51	29	1.759	39	
6	Redhill	30	17	5	8	48	36	1.333	39	
7	Hayes	30	11	9	10	47	45	1.044	31	
8	Tilbury	30	10	9	11	48	43	1.116	29	
9	Cheshunt	30	9	9	12	33	30	1.100	27	
10	Harwich & Parkeston	30	7	12	11	44	43	1.023	26	
11	Southall	30	10	6	14	33	48	0.688	26	
12	Grays Athletic	30	9	8	13	26	40	0.650	26	
13	Wembley	30	9	7	14	34	46	0.739	25	
14	Maidenhead United	30	6	9	15	29	54	0.537	21	
15	Finchley (R)	30	7	5	18	30	73	0.411	19	Relegation to Division One
16	Eastbourne United (R)	30	3	3	24	27	97	0.278	9	Relegation to Division One

Source: rsssf.com
Rules for classification: 1) points; 2) goal ratio.
(C) Champions; (R) Relegated

=== Stadia and locations ===
Locations of the Athenian League Premier Division clubs
Greater London Athenian League Premier Division football clubs

Club	Stadium
Bishop's Stortford	Woodside Park
Cheshunt	Cheshunt Stadium
Dagenham	Victoria Road
Eastbourne United	The Oval
Finchley	Summers Lane
Grays Athletic	New Recreation Ground
Harwich & Parkeston	Royal Oak
Hayes	Church Road
Leatherhead	Fetcham Grove
Maidenhead United	York Road
Redhill	Kiln Brow
Slough Town	Wexham Park
Southall	Robert Parker Stadium
Tilbury	Chadfields
Walton & Hersham	The Sports Ground
Wembley	Vale Farm

== Division One ==
Athenian League Division One
- Season: 1969–70
- Champions: Lewes
- Promoted: Lewes; Boreham Wood
- Relegated: Ware; Croydon Amateurs

The division featured 4 new teams:

- 2 relegated from last season's Premier Division:
  - Hornchurch (15th)
  - Hounslow (16th)
- 2 promoted from last season's Division Two:
  - Boreham Wood (1st)
  - Aveley (2nd)

=== League table ===
Pos	Team	Pld	W	D	L	GF	GA	GR	Pts	Promotion or relegation
1	Lewes (C, P)	30	20	5	5	59	20	2.950	45	Promotion to Premier Division
2	Boreham Wood (P)	30	20	5	5	66	27	2.444	45	Promotion to Premier Division
3	Erith & Belvedere	30	15	9	6	59	33	1.788	39	
4	Aveley	30	16	5	9	65	44	1.477	37	
5	Hertford Town	30	14	6	10	43	31	1.387	34	
6	Harlow Town	30	15	4	11	53	47	1.128	34	
7	Chesham United	30	11	10	9	53	43	1.233	32	
8	Dorking	30	10	10	10	39	37	1.054	30	
9	Carshalton Athletic	30	11	7	12	39	39	1.000	29	
10	Hounslow	30	11	5	14	37	43	0.860	27	
11	Aylesbury United	30	9	8	13	38	50	0.760	26	
12	Hornchurch	30	8	9	13	30	36	0.833	25	
13	Wokingham Town	30	9	7	14	34	51	0.667	25	
14	Letchworth Town	30	8	5	17	41	74	0.554	21	
15	Ware (R)	30	4	9	17	35	81	0.432	17	Relegation to Division Two
16	Croydon Amateurs (R)	30	5	4	21	28	63	0.444	14	Relegation to Division Two

Source: rsssf.com
Rules for classification: 1) points; 2) goal ratio.
(C) Champions; (P) Promoted; (R) Relegated

=== Stadia and locations ===
Locations of the Athenian League Division One clubs
Greater London Athenian League Division One football clubs

Club	Stadium
Aveley	The Mill Field
Aylesbury United	Buckingham Road
Boreham Wood	Meadow Park
Carshalton Athletic	War Memorial Sports Ground
Chesham United	The Meadow
Croydon Amateurs	Croydon Sports Arena
Dorking	Meadowbank Stadium
Erith & Belvedere	Park View
Harlow Town	Harlow Sportcentre
Hertford Town	Hertingfordbury Park
Hornchurch	Hornchurch Stadium
Hounslow	Denbigh Road
Letchworth Town	Baldock Road
Lewes	The Dripping Pan
Ware	Wodson Park
Wokingham Town	Cantley Park

== Division Two ==
Athenian League Division Two
- Season: 1969–70
- Champions: Horsham
- Promoted: Horsham; Edmonton
- Relegated: None

The division featured 2 new teams, all relegated from last season's Division One:

- Hemel Hempstead Town (15th)
- Leyton (16th)

=== League table ===
Pos	Team	Pld	W	D	L	GF	GA	GR	Pts	Promotion
1	Horsham (C, P)	30	19	9	2	68	30	2.267	47	Promotion to Division One
2	Edmonton (P)	30	20	4	6	85	34	2.500	44	Promotion to Division One
3	Herne Bay	30	18	5	7	69	34	2.029	41	
4	Eastbourne	30	17	7	6	48	26	1.846	41	
5	Marlow	30	13	9	8	51	39	1.308	35	
6	Uxbridge	30	13	8	9	49	40	1.225	34	
7	Rainham Town	30	11	11	8	47	39	1.205	33	
8	Edgware Town	30	10	10	10	38	38	1.000	30	
9	Leyton	30	12	5	13	50	64	0.781	29	
10	Worthing	30	9	9	12	39	44	0.886	27	
11	Windsor & Eton	30	7	13	10	34	40	0.850	27	
12	Hemel Hempstead Town	30	10	4	16	36	50	0.720	24	
13	Wingate	30	7	8	15	36	56	0.643	22	
14	Harrow Borough	30	4	8	18	33	67	0.493	16	
15	Epsom & Ewell	30	5	6	19	22	55	0.400	16	
16	Ruislip Manor	30	4	6	20	33	82	0.402	14	

Source: rsssf.com
Rules for classification: 1) points; 2) goal ratio.
(C) Champions; (P) Promoted

=== Stadia and locations ===
Locations of the Athenian League Division Two clubs
Greater London Athenian League Division Two football clubs

Club	Stadium
Eastbourne Town	The Saffrons
Edgware	White Lion
Edmonton	Coles Park
Epsom & Ewell	Merland Rise
Harrow Borough	Earlsmead Stadium
Hemel Hempstead	Vauxhall Road
Herne Bay	Winch's Field
Horsham	Queen Street
Leyton	Leyton Stadium
Marlow	Alfred Davis Memorial Ground
Rainham Town	Deri Park
Ruislip Manor	Grosvenor Vale
Uxbridge	Honeycroft
Windsor & Eton	Stag Meadow
Wingate	Hall Lane
Worthing	Woodside Road
