= 1981–82 Isthmian League =

The 1981–82 season was the 67th season of the Isthmian League, an English football competition.

Leytonstone & Ilford were champions, winning their first Isthmian League title two years after merging. There was no promotion from the Isthmian League to the Alliance Premier League till 1985. Bognor Regis Town were transferred from the Southern Football League and won promotion to the Premier Division at the first attempt. Camberley Town left the league at the end of the season.

== Premier Division ==
Isthmian League Premier Division
- Season: 1981–82
- Champions: Leytonstone & Ilford
- Relegated: Boreham Wood; Harlow Town
- Matches: 462
- Goals: 1,317 (2.85 per match)

The Premier Division consisted of 22 clubs, including 20 clubs from the previous season and two new clubs, promoted from Division One:

- Billericay Town
- Bishop's Stortford

=== League table ===
Pos	Team	Pld	W	D	L	GF	GA	GD	Pts	Relegation
1	Leytonstone & Ilford	42	26	5	11	91	52	+39	83	
2	Sutton United	42	22	9	11	72	49	+23	75	
3	Wycombe Wanderers	42	21	10	11	63	48	+15	73	
4	Staines Town	42	21	9	12	59	46	+13	72	
5	Walthamstow Avenue	42	21	7	14	81	62	+19	70	
6	Harrow Borough	42	18	13	11	77	55	+22	67	
7	Tooting & Mitcham United	42	19	10	13	58	47	+11	67	
8	Slough Town	42	17	13	12	64	54	+10	64	
9	Leatherhead	42	16	12	14	57	52	+5	60	
10	Hayes	42	16	10	16	58	52	+6	58	
11	Croydon	42	16	9	17	59	57	+2	57	
12	Barking	42	14	14	14	53	51	+2	56	
13	Hendon	42	13	13	16	56	65	−9	52	
14	Dulwich Hamlet	42	14	10	18	47	59	−12	52	
15	Bishop's Stortford	42	15	5	22	50	70	−20	50	
16	Carshalton Athletic	42	14	8	20	58	86	−28	50	
17	Billericay Town	42	11	16	15	41	50	−9	49	
18	Hitchin Town	42	12	11	19	56	77	−21	47	
19	Bromley	42	13	7	22	63	79	−16	46	
20	Woking	42	11	13	18	57	75	−18	46	
21	Harlow Town	42	10	11	21	50	73	−23	41	Relegated to Division One
22	Boreham Wood	42	8	13	21	47	58	−11	37	Relegated to Division One

Source: fchd.com rsssf.com
Rules for classification: 1) points; 2) goal difference; 3) number of goals scored.

=== Stadia and locations ===
Locations of the Premier Division clubs
Greater London Premier Division football clubs

Club	Stadium
Barking	Mayesbrook Park
Billericay Town	New Lodge
Bishop's Stortford	Woodside Park
Boreham Wood	Meadow Park
Bromley	Hayes Lane
Carshalton Athletic	War Memorial Sports Ground
Croydon	Croydon Sports Arena
Dulwich Hamlet	Champion Hill
Harlow Town	Harlow Sportcentre
Harrow Borough	Earlsmead Stadium
Hayes	Church Road
Hendon	Claremont Road
Hitchin Town	Top Field
Leatherhead	Fetcham Grove
Leytonstone/Ilford	Victoria Road
Slough Town	Wexham Park
Staines Town	Wheatsheaf Park
Sutton United	Gander Green Lane
Tooting & Mitcham United	Imperial Fields
Walthamstow Avenue	Green Pond Road
Woking	The Laithwaite Community Stadium
Wycombe Wanderers	Adams Park

== Division One ==
Isthmian League Division One
- Season: 1981–82
- Champions: Wokingham Town
- Promoted: Bognor Regis Town; Wokingham Town
- Relegated: Clapton; Ware
- Matches: 420
- Goals: 1,206 (2.87 per match)

Division One consisted of 21 clubs, including 18 clubs from the previous season and three new clubs:

- Bognor Regis Town, transferred from Southern Football League Southern Division
- Feltham, promoted as champions of Division Two
- Hornchurch, promoted as runners-up in Division Two

=== League table ===
Pos	Team	Pld	W	D	L	GF	GA	GD	Pts	Promotion or relegation
1	Wokingham Town	40	29	5	6	86	30	+56	92	Promoted to the Premier Division
2	Bognor Regis Town	40	23	10	7	65	34	+31	79	Promoted to the Premier Division
3	Metropolitan Police	40	22	11	7	75	48	+27	77	
4	Oxford City	40	21	11	8	82	47	+35	74	
5	Feltham	40	20	8	12	65	49	+16	68	
6	Lewes	40	19	7	14	73	66	+7	64	
7	Hertford Town	40	16	10	14	62	54	+8	58	
8	Wembley	40	14	15	11	69	55	+14	57	
9	Farnborough Town	40	15	11	14	71	57	+14	56	
10	Epsom & Ewell	40	16	8	16	54	44	+10	56	
11	Kingstonian	40	16	7	17	57	56	+1	55	
12	Hampton	40	15	9	16	52	52	0	54	
13	Hornchurch	40	13	15	12	42	50	−8	54	
14	Aveley	40	14	10	16	46	58	−12	52	
15	St Albans City	40	14	9	17	55	55	0	51	
16	Maidenhead United	40	11	10	19	49	70	−21	43	
17	Tilbury	40	9	15	16	49	67	−18	42	
18	Walton & Hersham	40	10	11	19	43	65	−22	41	
19	Chesham United	40	9	9	22	39	72	−33	36	
20	Clapton	40	9	7	24	44	73	−29	34	Relegated to Division Two
21	Ware	40	5	2	33	29	105	−76	17	Relegated to Division Two

Source: fchd.com rsssf.com
Rules for classification: 1) points; 2) goal difference; 3) number of goals scored.

=== Stadia and locations ===
Locations of the Division One clubs
Greater London Division One football clubs

Club	Stadium
Aveley	The Mill Field
Bognor Regis Town	Nyewood Lane
Chesham United	The Meadow
Clapton	The Old Spotted Dog Ground
Epsom & Ewell	Merland Rise
Farnborough Town	Cherrywood Road
Feltham	The Orchard
Hampton	Beveree Stadium
Hertford Town	Hertingfordbury Park
Hornchurch	Hornchurch Stadium
Kingstonian	Kingsmeadow
Lewes	The Dripping Pan
Maidenhead United	York Road
Metropolitan Police	Imber Court
Oxford City	Marsh Lane
St Albans City	Clarence Park
Tilbury	Chadfields
Walton & Hersham	The Sports Ground
Ware	Wodson Park
Wembley	Vale Farm
Wokingham Town	Cantley Park

== Division Two ==
Isthmian League Division Two
- Season: 1981–82
- Champions: Worthing
- Promoted: Cheshunt; Worthing
- Matches: 420
- Goals: 1,239 (2.95 per match)

Second Division consisted of 21 clubs, including 17 clubs from the previous season and four new teams:

Two clubs relegated from Division One:

- Camberley Town
- Finchley

Two clubs joined from the Athenian League:

- Basildon United
- Windsor & Eton

=== League table ===
Pos	Team	Pld	W	D	L	GF	GA	GD	Pts	Promotion or relegation
1	Worthing	40	29	6	5	95	25	+70	93	Promoted to Division One
2	Cheshunt	40	25	7	8	79	33	+46	82	Promoted to Division One
3	Hungerford Town	40	22	10	8	89	42	+47	74 (Note: Hungerford Town were deducted two points.)	
4	Barton Rovers	40	22	8	10	65	32	+33	74	
5	Windsor & Eton	40	22	6	12	69	49	+20	72	
6	Corinthian-Casuals	40	19	12	9	67	50	+17	69	
7	Harwich & Parkeston	40	19	12	9	64	47	+17	69	
8	Letchworth Garden City	40	15	11	14	67	55	+12	56	
9	Dorking Town	40	13	17	10	52	44	+8	56	
10	Hemel Hempstead	40	15	9	16	54	49	+5	54	
11	Basildon United	40	16	5	19	64	51	+13	53	
12	Finchley	40	14	9	17	57	68	−11	51	
13	Southall	40	12	14	14	36	42	−6	50	
14	Epping Town	40	12	11	17	48	62	−14	47	
15	Molesey	40	13	7	20	61	73	−12	46	
16	Egham Town	40	11	9	20	56	64	−8	42	
17	Rainham Town	40	11	9	20	53	83	−30	42	
18	Tring Town	40	9	13	18	49	78	−29	40	
19	Eastbourne United	40	9	12	19	51	73	−22	39	
20	Horsham	40	10	9	21	42	79	−37	39	
21	Camberley Town	40	3	2	35	21	140	−119	11	Resigned and joined the Athenian League

Source: fchd.com rsssf.com
Rules for classification: 1) points; 2) goal difference; 3) number of goals scored.

=== Stadia and locations ===
Locations of the Division Two clubs
Greater London Division Two football clubs

Club	Stadium
Barton Rovers	Sharpenhoe Road
Basildon United	Gardiners Close
Camberley Town	Kroomer Park
Cheshunt	Cheshunt Stadium
Corinthian-Casuals	King George's Field
Dorking	Meadowbank Stadium
Eastbourne United	The Oval
Egham Town	The Runnymede Stadium
Epping Town	Stonards Hill
Finchley	Summers Lane
Harwich & Parkeston	Royal Oak
Hemel Hempstead	Vauxhall Road
Horsham	Queen Street
Hungerford Town	Bulpit Lane
Letchworth Garden City	Baldock Road
Molesey	Walton Road Stadium
Rainham Town	Deri Park
Southall	Robert Parker Stadium
Tring Town	Pendley Ground
Windsor & Eton	Stag Meadow
Worthing	Woodside Road
