= 1982–83 Isthmian League =

The 1982–83 season was the 68th season of the Isthmian League, an English football competition.

Wycombe Wanderers were champions, winning their seventh Isthmian League title. There was no promotion from the Isthmian League to the Alliance Premier League till 1985. Worthing finished second in Division One achieving the second promotion in a row.

== Premier Division ==
Isthmian League Premier Division
- Season: 1982–83
- Champions: Wycombe Wanderers
- Relegated: Leatherhead; Woking
- Matches: 462
- Goals: 1,312 (2.84 per match)

The Premier Division consisted of 22 clubs, including 20 clubs from the previous season and two new clubs, promoted from Division One:

- Bognor Regis Town
- Wokingham Town

At the end of the season Leytonstone & Ilford changed name into Leytonstone/Ilford.

=== League table ===
Pos	Team	Pld	W	D	L	GF	GA	GD	Pts	Relegation
1	Wycombe Wanderers	42	26	7	9	79	47	+32	85	
2	Leytonstone & Ilford	42	24	9	9	71	39	+32	81	
3	Harrow Borough	42	24	7	11	91	58	+33	79	
4	Hayes	42	23	9	10	63	41	+22	78	
5	Sutton United	42	20	8	14	96	71	+25	68	
6	Dulwich Hamlet	42	18	14	10	59	52	+7	68	
7	Slough Town	42	18	13	11	73	36	+37	67	
8	Bognor Regis Town	42	19	8	15	53	48	+5	65	
9	Tooting & Mitcham United	42	18	9	15	58	56	+2	63	
10	Billericay Town	42	17	10	15	54	51	+3	61	
11	Croydon	42	17	9	16	68	58	+10	60	
12	Hendon	42	18	6	18	68	61	+7	60	
13	Bishop's Stortford	42	17	9	16	61	58	+3	60	
14	Barking	42	14	14	14	47	55	−8	56	
15	Bromley	42	14	12	16	51	50	+1	54	
16	Carshalton Athletic	42	15	9	18	58	60	−2	54	
17	Wokingham Town	42	13	9	20	37	51	−14	48	
18	Walthamstow Avenue	42	12	11	19	48	64	−16	47	
19	Staines Town	42	12	11	19	62	79	−17	47	
20	Hitchin Town	42	11	9	22	49	77	−28	42	
21	Woking	42	6	6	30	30	79	−49	24	Relegated to Division One
22	Leatherhead	42	4	5	33	36	121	−85	17	Relegated to Division One

Source: fchd.com rsssf.com
Rules for classification: 1) points; 2) goal difference; 3) number of goals scored.

=== Stadia and locations ===
Locations of the Premier Division clubs
Greater London Premier Division football clubs

Club	Stadium
Barking	Mayesbrook Park
Billericay Town	New Lodge
Bishop's Stortford	Woodside Park
Bognor Regis Town	Nyewood Lane
Bromley	Hayes Lane
Carshalton Athletic	War Memorial Sports Ground
Croydon	Croydon Sports Arena
Dulwich Hamlet	Champion Hill
Hayes	Church Road
Harrow Borough	Earlsmead Stadium
Hendon	Claremont Road
Hitchin Town	Top Field
Leatherhead	Fetcham Grove
Leytonstone/Ilford	Victoria Road
Slough Town	Wexham Park
Staines Town	Wheatsheaf Park
Sutton United	Gander Green Lane
Tooting & Mitcham United	Imperial Fields
Walthamstow Avenue	Green Pond Road
Woking	The Laithwaite Community Stadium
Wokingham Town	Cantley Park
Wycombe Wanderers	Adams Park

== Division One ==
Isthmian League Division One
- Season: 1982–83
- Champions: Worthing
- Promoted: Harlow Town; Worthing
- Relegated: St Albans City
- Matches: 420
- Goals: 1,217 (2.9 per match)

Division One consisted of 21 clubs, including 17 clubs from the previous season and four new clubs:

Two clubs relegated from the Premier Division:

- Boreham Wood
- Harlow Town

Two clubs promoted from Division Two:

- Cheshunt
- Worthing

=== League table ===
Pos	Team	Pld	W	D	L	GF	GA	GD	Pts	Promotion or relegation
1	Worthing	40	25	6	9	76	39	+37	81	Promoted to the Premier Division
2	Harlow Town	40	21	11	8	84	55	+29	74	Promoted to the Premier Division
3	Farnborough Town	40	20	13	7	69	39	+30	73	
4	Hertford Town	40	20	11	9	70	61	+9	71	
5	Oxford City	40	19	13	8	70	49	+21	70	
6	Boreham Wood	40	21	6	13	62	42	+20	69	
7	Metropolitan Police	40	19	9	12	77	57	+20	66	
8	Walton & Hersham	40	17	6	17	65	59	+6	57	
9	Hampton	40	15	10	15	62	60	+2	55	
10	Wembley	40	14	10	16	62	61	+1	52	
11	Aveley	40	15	7	18	52	62	−10	52	
12	Kingstonian	40	13	12	15	53	53	0	51	
13	Tilbury	40	12	10	18	41	47	−6	46	
14	Feltham	40	11	12	17	45	54	−9	45	
15	Chesham United	40	13	6	21	43	70	−27	45	
16	Epsom & Ewell	40	10	14	16	44	49	−5	44	
17	Lewes	40	12	8	20	47	71	−24	44	
18	Cheshunt	40	10	13	17	41	49	−8	43	
19	Hornchurch	40	11	8	21	45	74	−29	41	
20	Maidenhead United	40	10	10	20	57	87	−30	40	
21	St Albans City	40	10	9	21	52	79	−27	39	Relegated to Division Two

Source: fchd.com rsssf.com
Rules for classification: 1) points; 2) goal difference; 3) number of goals scored.

=== Stadia and locations ===
Locations of the Division One clubs
Greater London Division One football clubs

Club	Stadium
Aveley	The Mill Field
Boreham Wood	Meadow Park
Chesham United	The Meadow
Cheshunt	Cheshunt Stadium
Epsom & Ewell	Merland Rise
Farnborough Town	Cherrywood Road
Feltham	The Orchard
Hampton	Beveree Stadium
Harlow Town	Harlow Sportcentre
Hertford Town	Hertingfordbury Park
Hornchurch	Hornchurch Stadium
Kingstonian	Kingsmeadow
Lewes	The Dripping Pan
Maidenhead United	York Road
Metropolitan Police	Imber Court
Oxford City	Marsh Lane
St Albans City	Clarence Park
Tilbury	Chadfields
Walton & Hersham	The Sports Ground
Wembley	Vale Farm
Worthing	Woodside Road

== Division Two ==
Isthmian League Division Two
- Season: 1982–83
- Champions: Clapton
- Promoted: Clapton; Windsor & Eton
- Matches: 462
- Goals: 1,510 (3.27 per match)

Division Two consisted of 22 clubs, including 18 clubs from the previous season and four new teams:

Two clubs relegated from Division One:

- Clapton
- Ware

Two clubs joined from the Athenian League:

- Leyton-Wingate
- Uxbridge

At the end of the season Dorking Town were renamed Dorking.

=== League table ===
Pos	Team	Pld	W	D	L	GF	GA	GD	Pts	Promotion or relegation
1	Clapton	42	30	4	8	96	46	+50	94	Promoted to Division One
2	Windsor & Eton	42	27	7	8	98	43	+55	88	Promoted to Division One
3	Barton Rovers	42	26	6	10	86	48	+38	84	
4	Leyton-Wingate	42	25	8	9	111	41	+70	83	
5	Basildon United	42	23	13	6	92	42	+50	82	
6	Uxbridge	42	22	12	8	80	42	+38	78	
7	Hungerford Town	42	22	10	10	82	39	+43	76	
8	Corinthian-Casuals	42	23	6	13	95	48	+47	75	
9	Egham Town	42	21	8	13	77	67	+10	71	
10	Tring Town	42	20	10	12	86	59	+27	70	
11	Letchworth Garden City	42	18	13	11	68	53	+15	66 (Note: Letchworth Garden City were deducted one point.)	
12	Southall	42	18	7	17	81	80	+1	61	
13	Molesey	42	17	9	16	73	56	+17	60	
14	Dorking Town	42	15	9	18	56	75	−19	54	
15	Hemel Hempstead	42	12	14	16	53	59	−6	50	
16	Rainham Town	42	14	4	24	57	94	−37	46	
17	Eastbourne United	42	10	6	26	54	104	−50	36	
18	Epping Town	42	6	8	28	29	89	−60	26	
19	Ware	42	6	6	30	34	97	−63	24	
20	Finchley	42	4	12	26	28	92	−64	24	
21	Horsham	42	5	7	30	32	106	−74	22	
22	Harwich & Parkeston	42	5	7	30	42	130	−88	22	Resigned and joined the Athenian League

Source: fchd.com rsssf.com
Rules for classification: 1) points; 2) goal difference; 3) number of goals scored.

=== Stadia and locations ===
Locations of the Division Two clubs
Greater London Division Two football clubs

Club	Stadium
Barton Rovers	Sharpenhoe Road
Basildon United	Gardiners Close
Clapton	The Old Spotted Dog Ground
Corinthian-Casuals	King George's Field
Dorking	Meadowbank Stadium
Eastbourne United	The Oval
Egham Town	The Runnymede Stadium
Epping Town	Stonards Hill
Finchley	Summers Lane
Harwich & Parkeston	Royal Oak
Hemel Hempstead	Vauxhall Road
Horsham	Queen Street
Hungerford Town	Bulpit Lane
Letchworth Garden City	Baldock Road
Leyton-Wingate	Wadham Lodge
Molesey	Walton Road Stadium
Rainham Town	Deri Park
Southall	Robert Parker Stadium
Tring Town	Pendley Ground
Uxbridge	Honeycroft
Ware	Wodson Park
Windsor & Eton	Stag Meadow
