= 1980–81 Isthmian League =

The 1980–81 season was the 66th season of the Isthmian League, an English football competition.

Slough Town were champions, winning their first Isthmian League title. Though, there was no promotion from the Isthmian League to the Alliance Premier League till 1985, at the end of the season two Premier Division clubs - Dagenham and Enfield were accepted to the APL. Billericay Town finished second in Division One achieving the second promotion in a row. Willesden folded at the end of the season.

== Premier Division ==
Isthmian League Premier Division
- Season: 1980–81
- Champions: Slough Town
- Relegated: None
- Matches: 462
- Goals: 1,326 (2.87 per match)

The Premier Division consisted of 22 clubs, including 20 clubs from the previous season and two new clubs, promoted from Division One:

- Bromley
- Leytonstone & Ilford

There was no relegation from the division this season after Dagenham and Enfield joined the Alliance Premier League.

=== League table ===
Pos	Team	Pld	W	D	L	GF	GA	GD	Pts	Promotion or relegation
1	Slough Town	42	23	13	6	73	34	+39	82	
2	Enfield	42	23	11	8	81	43	+38	80	Joined the Alliance Premier League
3	Wycombe Wanderers	42	22	9	11	76	49	+27	75	
4	Leytonstone & Ilford	42	19	12	11	78	57	+21	69	
5	Sutton United	42	19	12	11	82	65	+17	69	
6	Hendon	42	18	10	14	66	58	+8	64	
7	Hayes	42	18	8	16	45	50	−5	62	
8	Dagenham	42	17	11	14	79	66	+13	62	Joined the Alliance Premier League
9	Harrow Borough	42	16	11	15	57	52	+5	59	
10	Bromley	42	16	9	17	63	69	−6	57	
11	Staines Town	42	15	9	18	60	61	−1	54	
12	Tooting & Mitcham United	42	15	8	19	49	53	−4	53	
13	Hitchin Town	42	14	10	18	64	62	+2	52	
14	Croydon	42	12	15	15	51	51	0	51	
15	Dulwich Hamlet	42	13	12	17	62	67	−5	51	
16	Leatherhead	42	12	14	16	36	50	−14	50	
17	Carshalton Athletic	42	14	8	20	57	82	−25	50	
18	Barking	42	13	12	17	58	72	−14	49 (Note: Barking were deducted two points.)	
19	Harlow Town	42	11	15	16	53	66	−13	48	
20	Walthamstow Avenue	42	13	7	22	50	81	−31	46	
21	Boreham Wood	42	10	13	19	46	69	−23	43	
22	Woking	42	11	7	24	40	69	−29	37 (Note: Woking were deducted three points.)	

Source: fchd.com rsssf.com
Rules for classification: 1) points; 2) goal difference; 3) number of goals scored.

=== Stadia and locations ===
Locations of the Premier Division clubs
Greater London Premier Division football clubs

Club	Stadium
Barking	Mayesbrook Park
Boreham Wood	Meadow Park
Bromley	Hayes Lane
Carshalton Athletic	War Memorial Sports Ground
Croydon	Croydon Sports Arena
Dagenham	Victoria Road
Dulwich Hamlet	Champion Hill
Enfield	Southbury Road
Harlow Town	Harlow Sportcentre
Harrow Borough	Earlsmead Stadium
Hayes	Church Road
Hendon	Claremont Road
Hitchin Town	Top Field
Leatherhead	Fetcham Grove
Leytonstone/Ilford	Victoria Road
Slough Town	Wexham Park
Staines Town	Wheatsheaf Park
Sutton United	Gander Green Lane
Tooting & Mitcham United	Imperial Fields
Walthamstow Avenue	Green Pond Road
Woking	The Laithwaite Community Stadium
Wycombe Wanderers	Adams Park

== Division One ==
Isthmian League Division One
- Season: 1980–81
- Champions: Bishop's Stortford
- Promoted: Billericay Town; Bishop's Stortford
- Relegated: Camberley Town; Finchley
- Matches: 462
- Goals: 1,311 (2.84 per match)

Division One consisted of 22 clubs, including 18 clubs from the previous season and four new clubs:

Two clubs relegated from the Premier Division:

- Oxford City
- Tilbury

Two clubs promoted from Division Two:

- Billericay Town
- Lewes

=== League table ===
Pos	Team	Pld	W	D	L	GF	GA	GD	Pts	Promotion or relegation
1	Bishop's Stortford	42	30	6	6	84	28	+56	96	Promoted to the Premier Division
2	Billericay Town	42	29	6	7	67	34	+33	93	Promoted to the Premier Division
3	Epsom & Ewell	42	24	12	6	80	36	+44	84	
4	Farnborough Town	42	23	11	8	75	39	+36	80	
5	St Albans City	42	24	5	13	85	61	+24	77	
6	Kingstonian	42	20	9	13	63	51	+12	66 (Note: Kingstonian were deducted three points.)	
7	Oxford City	42	18	9	15	71	48	+23	63	
8	Wokingham Town	42	16	15	11	70	56	+14	63	
9	Metropolitan Police	42	18	7	17	61	58	+3	61	
10	Chesham United	42	17	7	18	64	64	0	58	
11	Lewes	42	17	7	18	72	83	−11	58	
12	Maidenhead United	42	16	7	19	58	62	−4	55	
13	Walton & Hersham	42	12	15	15	46	53	−7	51	
14	Hertford Town	42	13	11	18	46	65	−19	50	
15	Hampton	42	12	13	17	46	53	−7	49	
16	Aveley	42	13	9	20	54	55	−1	48	
17	Wembley	42	13	8	21	47	61	−14	47	
18	Clapton	42	12	8	22	53	86	−33	44	
19	Ware	42	9	13	20	50	69	−19	40	
20	Tilbury	42	10	8	24	42	84	−42	38 (Note: Discordance between sources: fchd states that Tilbury were deducted three points, while rsssf doesn't.)	
21	Camberley Town	42	8	7	27	42	88	−46	31	Relegated to Division Two
22	Finchley	42	6	11	25	35	77	−42	29	Relegated to Division Two

Source: fchd.com rsssf.com
Rules for classification: 1) points; 2) goal difference; 3) number of goals scored.

=== Stadia and locations ===
Locations of the Division One clubs
Greater London Division One football clubs

Club	Stadium
Aveley	The Mill Field
Billericay Town	New Lodge
Bishop's Stortford	Woodside Park
Camberley Town	Kroomer Park
Chesham United	The Meadow
Clapton	The Old Spotted Dog Ground
Epsom & Ewell	Merland Rise
Farnborough Town	Cherrywood Road
Finchley	Summers Lane
Hampton	Beveree Stadium
Hertford Town	Hertingfordbury Park
Kingstonian	Kingsmeadow
Lewes	The Dripping Pan
Maidenhead United	York Road
Metropolitan Police	Imber Court
Oxford City	Marsh Lane
St Albans City	Clarence Park
Tilbury	Chadfields
Walton & Hersham	The Sports Ground
Ware	Wodson Park
Wembley	Vale Farm
Wokingham Town	Cantley Park

== Division Two ==
Isthmian League Division Two
- Season: 1980–81
- Champions: Feltham
- Promoted: Feltham; Hornchurch
- Matches: 380
- Goals: 1,042 (2.74 per match)

Second Division consisted of 20 clubs, including 17 clubs from the previous season and three new teams:

- Dorking Town, joined from the Athenian League
- Harwich & Parkeston, relegated from Division One
- Horsham, relegated from Division One

=== League table ===
Pos	Team	Pld	W	D	L	GF	GA	GD	Pts	Promotion or relegation
1	Feltham	38	24	10	4	65	30	+35	82	Promoted to Division One
2	Hornchurch	38	25	6	7	74	35	+39	81	Promoted to Division One
3	Hungerford Town	38	23	10	5	84	29	+55	79	
4	Barton Rovers	38	19	11	8	61	26	+35	68	
5	Worthing	38	19	11	8	74	43	+31	68	
6	Cheshunt	38	19	11	8	57	33	+24	68	
7	Letchworth Garden City	38	18	7	13	49	40	+9	61	
8	Southall	38	14	11	13	48	52	−4	53	
9	Dorking Town	38	13	12	13	47	45	+2	51	
10	Horsham	38	16	3	19	47	47	0	51	
11	Hemel Hempstead	38	14	7	17	49	55	−6	49	
12	Egham Town	38	13	9	16	45	62	−17	48	
13	Harwich & Parkeston	38	12	11	15	57	58	−1	47	
14	Rainham Town	38	11	13	14	44	45	−1	46	
15	Epping Town	38	12	7	19	37	50	−13	43	
16	Eastbourne United	38	11	10	17	59	75	−16	43	
17	Willesden	38	11	8	19	57	68	−11	41	Folded at the end of the season
18	Tring Town	38	11	6	21	40	71	−31	39	
19	Molesey	38	4	9	25	31	83	−52	21	
20	Corinthian-Casuals	38	1	8	29	17	95	−78	11	

Source: fchd.com rsssf.com
Rules for classification: 1) points; 2) goal difference; 3) number of goals scored.

=== Stadia and locations ===
Locations of the Division Two clubs
Greater London Division Two football clubs

Club	Stadium
Barton Rovers	Sharpenhoe Road
Cheshunt	Cheshunt Stadium
Corinthian-Casuals	King George's Field
Dorking	Meadowbank Stadium
Eastbourne United	The Oval
Egham Town	The Runnymede Stadium
Epping Town	Stonards Hill
Feltham	The Orchard
Harwich & Parkeston	Royal Oak
Hemel Hempstead	Vauxhall Road
Hornchurch	Hornchurch Stadium
Horsham	Queen Street
Hungerford Town	Bulpit Lane
Letchworth Garden City	Baldock Road
Molesey	Walton Road Stadium
Rainham Town	Deri Park
Southall	Robert Parker Stadium
Tring Town	Pendley Ground
Willesden	King Edwards Park
Worthing	Woodside Road
