= 1971–72 Athenian League =

Athenian League
- Season: 1971–72

The 1971–72 Athenian League season was the 49th in the history of Athenian League. The league consisted of 48 teams.

== Premier Division ==
Athenian League Premier Division
- Season: 1971–72
- Champions: Slough Town
- Promoted: Leatherhead
- Relegated: Grays Athletic

The division featured three new teams, promoted from last season's Division One:

- Aveley (1st)
- Erith & Belvedere (2nd)
- Hornchurch (3rd)

=== League table ===
Pos	Team	Pld	W	D	L	GF	GA	GR	Pts	Promotion or relegation
1	Slough Town (C)	30	22	4	4	60	17	3.529	48	
2	Dagenham	30	19	5	6	61	27	2.259	43	
3	Leatherhead (P)	30	16	8	6	56	29	1.931	40	Promotion to Isthmian League
4	Tilbury	30	15	9	6	62	46	1.348	39	
5	Harwich & Parkeston	30	14	9	7	47	40	1.175	37	
6	Maidenhead United	30	13	8	9	38	31	1.226	34	
7	Redhill	30	11	10	9	51	35	1.457	32	
8	Cheshunt	30	10	11	9	43	37	1.162	31	
9	Aveley	30	12	6	12	46	37	1.243	30	
10	Hornchurch	30	10	8	12	39	38	1.026	28	
11	Boreham Wood	30	11	6	13	40	45	0.889	28	
12	Lewes	30	10	8	12	48	52	0.923	28	
13	Erith & Belvedere	30	9	8	13	39	54	0.722	26	
14	Southall	30	5	9	16	25	49	0.510	19	
15	Wembley	30	3	5	22	26	58	0.448	11	
16	Grays Athletic (R)	30	1	4	25	25	111	0.225	6	Relegation to Division One

Source: rsssf.com
Rules for classification: 1) points; 2) goal ratio.
(C) Champions; (P) Promoted; (R) Relegated

=== Stadia and locations ===
Locations of the Athenian League Premier Division clubs
Greater London Athenian League Premier Division football clubs

Club	Stadium
Aveley	The Mill Field
Boreham Wood	Meadow Park
Cheshunt	Cheshunt Stadium
Dagenham	Victoria Road
Erith & Belvedere	Park View
Grays Athletic	New Recreation Ground
Harwich & Parkeston	Royal Oak
Hornchurch	Hornchurch Stadium
Leatherhead	Fetcham Grove
Lewes	The Dripping Pan
Maidenhead United	York Road
Redhill	Kiln Brow
Slough Town	Wexham Park
Southall	Robert Parker Stadium
Tilbury	Chadfields
Wembley	Vale Farm

== Division One ==
Athenian League Division One
- Season: 1971–72
- Champions: Harlow Town
- Promoted: Harlow Town; Croydon Amateurs
- Relegated: None

The division featured three new teams, promoted from last season's Division Two:

- Herne Bay (1st)
- Croydon Amateurs (2nd)
- Marlow (3rd)

=== League table ===
Pos	Team	Pld	W	D	L	GF	GA	GR	Pts	Promotion or relegation
1	Harlow Town (C, P)	30	22	5	3	96	40	2.400	49	Promotion to Premier Division
2	Croydon Amateurs (P)	30	20	6	4	77	25	3.080	46	Promotion to Premier Division
3	Horsham	30	17	6	7	59	34	1.735	40	
4	Carshalton Athletic	30	16	7	7	57	37	1.541	39	
5	Marlow	30	12	11	7	53	41	1.293	35	
6	Hertford Town	30	16	3	11	58	49	1.184	35	Left to join Eastern Counties League
7	Finchley	30	12	9	9	43	43	1.000	33	
8	Chesham United	30	12	8	10	45	33	1.364	32	
9	Eastbourne United	30	10	8	12	48	51	0.941	28	
10	Herne Bay	30	10	8	12	43	51	0.843	28	
11	Dorking	30	10	6	14	48	62	0.774	26	
12	Edmonton	30	9	7	14	47	61	0.770	25	
13	Wokingham Town	30	7	6	17	30	51	0.588	20	
14	Letchworth Town	30	5	6	19	34	61	0.557	16	
15	Aylesbury United	30	4	8	18	42	90	0.467	16	
16	Hounslow	30	3	6	21	33	84	0.393	12	

Source: rsssf.com
Rules for classification: 1) points; 2) goal ratio.
(C) Champions; (P) Promoted

=== Stadia and locations ===
Locations of the Athenian League Division One clubs
Greater London Athenian League Division One football clubs

Club	Stadium
Aylesbury United	Buckingham Road
Carshalton Athletic	War Memorial Sports Ground
Chesham United	The Meadow
Croydon Amateurs	Croydon Sports Arena
Dorking	Meadowbank Stadium
Eastbourne United	The Oval
Finchley	Summers Lane
Edmonton	Coles Park
Harlow Town	Harlow Sportcentre
Herne Bay	Winch's Field
Hertford Town	Hertingfordbury Park
Horsham	Queen Street
Hounslow	Denbigh Road
Letchworth Town	Baldock Road
Marlow	Alfred Davis Memorial Ground
Wokingham Town	Cantley Park

== Division Two ==
Athenian League Division Two
- Season: 1971–72
- Champions: Staines Town
- Promoted: Staines Town; Worthing
- Relegated: None

The division joined 3 new teams, all from Spartan League:

- Staines Town
- Hampton
- Addlestone

=== League table ===
Pos	Team	Pld	W	D	L	GF	GA	GR	Pts	Promotion or relegation
1	Staines Town (C, P)	30	22	7	1	76	24	3.167	51	Promotion to Division One
2	Worthing (P)	30	18	5	7	54	29	1.862	41	Promotion to Division One
3	Hampton	30	17	6	7	57	32	1.781	40	
4	Windsor & Eton	30	17	5	8	51	35	1.457	39	
5	Addlestone	30	17	4	9	47	35	1.343	38	
6	Ware	30	16	2	12	45	41	1.098	34	
7	Hemel Hempstead	30	14	5	11	40	37	1.081	33	
8	Edgware Town	30	13	5	12	56	46	1.217	31	
9	Leyton	30	12	7	11	46	46	1.000	31	
10	Uxbridge	30	10	8	12	34	36	0.944	28	
11	Ruislip Manor	30	9	4	17	41	51	0.804	22	
12	Eastbourne Town	30	5	12	13	24	42	0.571	22	
13	Harrow Borough	30	7	6	17	27	47	0.574	20	
14	Wingate	30	8	3	19	33	72	0.458	19	
15	Rainham Town	30	5	7	18	34	60	0.567	17	
16	Epsom & Ewell	30	5	4	21	26	58	0.448	14	

Source: rsssf.com
Rules for classification: 1) points; 2) goal ratio.
(C) Champions; (P) Promoted

=== Stadia and locations ===
Locations of the Athenian League Division Two clubs
Greater London Athenian League Division Two football clubs

Club	Stadium
Addlestone	Liberty Lane
Eastbourne Town	The Saffrons
Edgware	White Lion
Epsom & Ewell	Merland Rise
Hampton	Beveree Stadium
Harrow Borough	Earlsmead Stadium
Hemel Hempstead	Vauxhall Road
Leyton	Leyton Stadium
Rainham Town	Deri Park
Ruislip Manor	Grosvenor Vale
Staines Town	Wheatsheaf Park
Uxbridge	Honeycroft
Ware	Wodson Park
Windsor & Eton	Stag Meadow
Wingate	Hall Lane
Worthing	Woodside Road
