= 1971–72 Isthmian League =

The 1971–72 season was the 57th in the history of the Isthmian League, an English football competition.

At the end of the previous season Maidstone United and Wealdstone switched to the Southern Football League, while Athenian League sides Bishop's Stortford, Hayes and Walton & Hersham were newly admitted.

Wycombe Wanderers were champions for the second season in a row, winning their fourth Isthmian League title.

== League table ==
Isthmian League
- Season: 1971–72
- Champions: Wycombe Wanderers
- Matches: 420
- Goals: 1,277 (3.04 per match)

Pos	Team	Pld	W	D	L	GF	GA	GR	Pts
1	Wycombe Wanderers	40	31	3	6	102	20	5.100	65
2	Enfield	40	26	8	6	90	41	2.195	60
3	Walton & Hersham	40	24	8	8	69	25	2.760	56
4	Hendon	40	23	10	7	79	35	2.257	56
5	Bishop's Stortford	40	24	5	11	61	37	1.649	53
6	Sutton United	40	21	10	9	77	43	1.791	52
7	St Albans City	40	23	4	13	74	47	1.574	50
8	Ilford	40	17	11	12	62	52	1.192	45
9	Barking	40	20	4	16	65	61	1.066	44
10	Hitchin Town	40	17	10	13	68	66	1.030	44
11	Bromley	40	16	10	14	67	64	1.047	42
12	Hayes	40	14	12	14	50	48	1.042	40
13	Oxford City	40	13	9	18	67	74	0.905	35
14	Woking	40	11	10	19	52	58	0.897	32
15	Kingstonian	40	10	12	18	49	59	0.831	32
16	Walthamstow Avenue	40	12	8	20	58	71	0.817	32
17	Leytonstone	40	11	8	21	48	68	0.706	30
18	Tooting & Mitcham United	40	6	9	25	38	93	0.409	21
19	Clapton	40	7	7	26	45	118	0.381	21
20	Dulwich Hamlet	40	4	12	24	35	81	0.432	20
21	Corinthian-Casuals	40	3	4	33	21	116	0.181	10

Source: fchd.com rsssf.com
Rules for classification: 1) points; 2) goal ratio.

=== Stadia and locations ===
Locations of the Isthmian League clubs
Greater London Isthmian League football clubs

Club	Stadium
Barking	Mayesbrook Park
Bishop's Stortford	Woodside Park
Bromley	Hayes Lane
Clapton	The Old Spotted Dog Ground
Corinthian-Casuals	King George's Field
Dulwich Hamlet	Champion Hill
Enfield	Southbury Road
Hayes	Church Road
Hendon	Claremont Road
Hitchin Town	Top Field
Ilford	Victoria Road
Kingstonian	Kingsmeadow
Leytonstone	Granleigh Road
Oxford City	Marsh Lane
St Albans City	Clarence Park
Sutton United	Gander Green Lane
Tooting & Mitcham United	Imperial Fields
Walthamstow Avenue	Green Pond Road
Walton & Hersham	The Sports Ground
Woking	The Laithwaite Community Stadium
Wycombe Wanderers	Adams Park
