= 1978–79 Athenian League =

Athenian League
- Season: 1978–79
- Champions: Billericay Town
- Promoted: Billericay Town
- Relegated: None

The 1978–79 Athenian League season was the 56th in the history of Athenian League. The league consisted of 19 teams.

== Clubs ==
The league joined 3 new teams:

- Welling United, from London Spartan League Premier Division
- Dorking Town, from Surrey Senior League
- Fleet Town, from Hampshire League Division Two

== League table ==
Pos	Team	Pld	W	D	L	GF	GA	GR	Pts	Promotion or relegation
1	Billericay Town (C, P)	36	26	5	5	86	29	2.966	57	Promotion to Isthmian League Division Two
2	Burnham	36	22	10	4	86	37	2.324	54	
3	Edgware	36	19	11	6	83	34	2.441	49	
4	Windsor & Eton	36	21	6	9	62	30	2.067	48	
5	Haringey Borough	36	16	15	5	60	42	1.429	47	
6	Uxbridge	36	17	12	7	45	22	2.045	46	
7	Welling United	36	17	9	10	60	46	1.304	43	
8	Leyton-Wingate	36	16	10	10	67	48	1.396	42	
9	Grays Athletic	36	17	8	11	55	46	1.196	42	
10	Alton Town	36	15	9	12	51	45	1.133	39	
11	Hoddesdon Town	36	13	7	16	63	60	1.050	33	
12	Chalfont St.Peter	36	12	8	16	41	58	0.707	32	
13	Harefield United	36	11	7	18	53	70	0.757	29	
14	Dorking Town	36	10	7	19	39	64	0.609	27	
15	Marlow	36	9	4	23	48	92	0.522	22	
16	Ruislip Manor	36	8	4	24	35	71	0.493	20	
17	Fleet Town	36	6	7	23	37	73	0.507	19	
18	Redhill	36	6	7	23	29	79	0.367	19	
19	Chertsey Town	36	4	8	24	36	90	0.400	16	

Source: fchd.info
Rules for classification: 1) points; 2) goal difference; 3) number of goals scored.
(C) Champions; (P) Promoted

=== Stadia and locations ===
Locations of the Athenian League clubs
Greater London Athenian League football clubs

Club	Stadium
Alton Town	Anstey Park
Billericay Town	New Lodge
Burnham	The 1878 Stadium
Chalfont St Peter	Mill Meadow
Chertsey Town	Alwyns Lane
Dorking Town	Meadowbank Stadium
Edgware	White Lion
Fleet Town	Calthorpe Park
Grays Athletic	New Recreation Ground
Harefield United	Preston Park
Haringey Borough	Coles Park
Hoddesdon Town	Lowfield
Leyton-Wingate	Wadham Lodge
Redhill	Kiln Brow
Ruislip Manor	Grosvenor Vale
Marlow	Alfred Davis Memorial Ground
Uxbridge	Honeycroft
Welling United	Park View Road
Windsor & Eton	Stag Meadow
