= 1972–73 Eastern Counties Football League =

The 1972–73 Eastern Counties Football League was the 31st season in the history of the Eastern Counties Football League.

Two new clubs joined the league this season:

- Hertford Town, transferred from the Athenian League.
- Peterborough United reserves

Gorleston were champions, winning their second Eastern Counties Football League title.

== League table ==
Eastern Counties Football League
- Season: 1972–73
- Champions: Gorleston
- Matches played: 420
- Goals scored: 1,377 (3.28 per match)

Pos	Team	Pld	W	D	L	GF	GA	GAv	Pts	Promotion or relegation
1	Gorleston (C)	40	27	8	5	93	41	2.268	62	
2	Sudbury Town	40	22	10	8	56	40	1.400	54	
3	Hertford Town	40	22	8	10	85	41	2.073	52	Left to join Isthmian League
4	Lowestoft Town	40	19	11	10	70	48	1.458	49	
5	Ely City	40	21	5	14	91	62	1.468	47	
6	Chatteris Town	40	19	9	12	88	75	1.173	47	
7	Peterborough United reserves	40	20	4	16	94	55	1.709	44	Resigned from the league
8	Wisbech Town	40	18	8	14	63	50	1.260	44	
9	Stowmarket	40	16	11	13	57	49	1.163	43	
10	Newmarket Town	40	17	8	15	59	64	0.922	42	
11	March Town United	40	16	8	16	76	67	1.134	40	
12	Norwich City 'A'	40	16	8	16	58	61	0.951	40	
13	Great Yarmouth Town	40	13	13	14	51	61	0.836	39	
14	Braintree & Crittall	40	13	12	15	51	57	0.895	38	
15	Clacton Town	40	10	14	16	60	89	0.674	34	
16	Thetford Town	40	10	12	18	68	87	0.782	32	
17	St Neots Town	40	11	10	19	48	62	0.774	32	Left to join United Counties League
18	Histon	40	10	7	23	48	86	0.558	27	
19	Gothic	40	9	8	23	54	88	0.614	26	
20	Haverhill Rovers	40	7	11	22	56	97	0.577	25	
21	Soham Town Rangers	40	6	11	23	51	97	0.526	23	

Source: rsssf.org
Rules for classification: 1) Points; 2) Goal average; 3) Goals scored
(C) Champions
