= 1912–13 Athenian League =

Athenian League
- Season: 1912–13
- Champions: Catford Southend F.C.
- Matches played: 72
- Goals scored: 225 (3.13 per match)

The 1912–13 season was the first in the history of the Athenian League, an English football competition.

Catford Southend emerged as champions. Barking resigned after 2 matches, with their record being expunged.

== League table ==
Pos	Team	Pld	W	D	L	GF	GA	GR	Pts
1	Catford Southend	16	11	3	2	50	15	3.333	25
2	Barnet & Alston	16	9	3	4	36	17	2.118	21
3	Tufnell Park	16	8	5	3	25	13	1.923	21
4	Finchley	16	8	4	4	19	11	1.727	20
5	Grays Athletic	16	4	6	6	18	23	0.783	14
6	Chelmsford	16	5	3	8	21	36	0.583	13
7	Enfield	16	3	6	7	18	28	0.643	12
8	Chesham Town	16	3	4	9	21	42	0.500	10
9	Romford Town	16	2	4	10	17	40	0.425	8
10	Barking	0	0	0	0	0	0	—	0 (Note: Barking resigned after 2 matches. Their record was expunged.)

Source: rsssf.com
Rules for classification: 1) points; 2) goal ratio.
