= Athenian League =

- Founded: 1912
- First season: 1912–13
- Folded: 1984
- Country: England
- Divisions: One (1912–1963, 1977–1984); Two (1973–1977); Three (1963–1973)
- Number of clubs: Lowest: 10 (1912–1913); Highest: 48 (1964–1972)
- Feeder to: Isthmian League
- Domestic cup(s): FA Cup, FA Amateur Cup; FA Trophy, FA Vase
- Most championships: Barnet (7)

The Athenian League was an English amateur football league for clubs in and around London. The league was originally to be called the Corinthian League, but this name was rejected by the Football Association. It was formed in 1912 with ten clubs, but had to close down in 1914 due to the onset of World War I. When it reformed in 1920, only three of the previous teams rejoined. Clubs left and joined the league at a rate of about one a year, with a number leaving to join the Isthmian League, the strongest amateur league in the London area. Total membership remained fairly stable at between twelve and sixteen clubs until 1963, when it absorbed most of the clubs from two rival leagues, the Corinthian League (most of whose former clubs formed Division One) and the Delphian League (most of whose former clubs formed Division Two). The existing division was renamed the Premier Division.

Over the following years it lost many clubs to stronger leagues, particularly the Isthmian League and Southern League, and successive waves of Isthmian League expansion in 1973, 1977 and 1984 finally forced the league to disband. The league was amongst the first in England to be sponsored by an external company when, in the late 1970s, it was billed as the Kingsmead Athenian League.

== Champions ==
The champion clubs were as follows:

| Season | Champions |
|---|---|
| 1912–13 | Catford Southend |
| 1913–14 | Tufnell Park |
| 1919–20 | Luton Clarence |
| 1920–21 | St Albans City |
| 1921–22 | St Albans City |
| 1922–23 | Bromley |
| 1923–24 | Kingstonian |
| 1924–25 | Redhill |
| 1925–26 | Kingstonian |
| 1926–27 | Southall |
| 1927–28 | Sutton United |
| 1928–29 | Leyton |
| 1929–30 | Walthamstow Avenue |
| 1930–31 | Barnet |
| 1931–32 | Barnet |
| 1932–33 | Walthamstow Avenue |
| 1933–34 | Walthamstow Avenue |
| 1934–35 | Barking |
| 1935–36 | Romford |
| 1936–37 | Romford |
| 1937–38 | Walthamstow Avenue |
| 1938–39 | Walthamstow Avenue |
| 1945–46 | Sutton United |
| 1946–47 | Barnet |
| 1947–48 | Barnet |
| 1948–49 | Bromley |
| 1949–50 | Tooting & Mitcham |
| 1950–51 | Bromley |
| 1951–52 | Wealdstone |
| 1952–53 | Hendon |
| 1953–54 | Finchley |
| 1954–55 | Tooting & Mitcham |
| 1955–56 | Hendon |
| 1956–57 | Hayes |
| 1957–58 | Sutton United |
| 1958–59 | Barnet |
| 1959–60 | Hounslow Town |
| 1960–61 | Hendon |
| 1961–62 | Enfield |
| 1962–63 | Enfield |

In 1963 the league expanded to three divisions

| Season | Premier Division | Division One | Division Two |
|---|---|---|---|
| 1963–64 | Barnet | Leatherhead | Tilbury |
| 1964–65 | Barnet | Slough Town | Harwich & Parkeston |
| 1965–66 | Leyton | Bishop's Stortford | Croydon Amateurs |
| 1966–67 | Leyton | Hornchurch | Eastbourne United |
| 1967–68 | Slough Town | Cheshunt | Lewes |
| 1968–69 | Walton & Hersham | Tilbury | Boreham Wood |
| 1969–70 | Bishop's Stortford | Lewes | Horsham |
| 1970–71 | Dagenham | Aveley | Herne Bay |
| 1971–72 | Slough Town | Harlow Town | Staines Town |
| 1972–73 | Slough Town | Horsham | Ruislip Manor |

In 1973 the league was reduced to two divisions

| Season | Division One | Division Two |
|---|---|---|
| 1973–74 | Boreham Wood | Alton Town |
| 1974–75 | Letchworth Town | Egham Town |
| 1975–76 | Cheshunt | Epping Town |
| 1976–77 | Leyton-Wingate | Farnborough Town |

In 1977 the league was reduced to a single division

| Season | Champions |
|---|---|
| 1977–78 | Billericay Town |
| 1978–79 | Billericay Town |
| 1979–80 | Windsor & Eton |
| 1980–81 | Windsor & Eton |
| 1981–82 | Leyton-Wingate |
| 1982–83 | Newbury Town |
| 1983–84 | Redhill |

== Member clubs ==
The league had 115 member clubs during its existence:

- Addlestone
- Alton Town
- Aveley
- Aylesbury United
- Banstead Athletic
- Barking
- Barnet
- Barnet & Alston
- Basildon United
- Berkhamsted Town
- Billericay Town
- Bishop's Stortford
- Boreham Wood
- Brentwood & Warley
- Bromley
- Burnham
- Camberley Town
- Cambridge City
- Carshalton Athletic
- Catford Southend
- Chalfont St Peter
- Chelmsford
- Chertsey Town
- Chesham Town
- Chesham United
- Cheshunt
- Croydon
- Dagenham
- Dorking
- Eastbourne Town
- Eastbourne United
- Edgware Town
- Edmonton
- Egham Town
- Enfield
- Epping Town
- Epsom & Ewell
- Erith & Belvedere
- Farnborough Town
- Faversham Town
- Feltham
- Finchley
- Flackwell Heath
- Fleet Town
- Grays Athletic
- Guildford
- Hampton
- Harefield United
- Haringey Borough
- Harlow Town
- Harrow Borough
- Harwich & Parkeston
- Hastings & St Leonards
- Hayes
- Hemel Hempstead Town
- Hendon
- Herne Bay
- Hertford Town
- Histon
- Hitchin Town
- Hoddesdon Town
- Horley Town
- Hornchurch
- Horsham
- Hounslow
- Kingsbury Town
- Kingstonian
- Leatherhead
- Letchworth Garden City
- Lewes
- Leyton
- Leyton-Wingate
- Luton Clarence
- Maidenhead United
- Maidstone United
- Marlow
- Metrogas
- Molesey
- Newbury Town
- Rainham Town
- Redhill
- Romford
- Romford Town
- Ruislip Manor
- Slough Town
- Southall
- St Albans City
- Staines Town
- Summerstown
- Sutton United
- Thatcham Town
- Tilbury
- Tooting
- Tooting & Mitcham
- Tring Town
- Tufnell Park
- Uxbridge
- Uxbridge Town
- Walthamstow Avenue
- Walton & Hersham
- Ware
- Wealdstone
- Welling United
- Wembley
- West London Old Boys
- West Norwood
- Whyteleafe
- Willesden
- Wimbledon
- Windsor & Eton
- Wingate
- Wokingham Town
- Wolverton Town
- Woodford Town
- Worthing
