= Wingate F.C. =

Wingate
- Full name: Wingate Football Club
- Founded: 1946
- Dissolved: 1991
- Ground: Hall Lane, Hendon
- 1990–91: South Midlands League Premier Division, 8th of 20
Home colours

Wingate Football Club was an English football club based in Hendon, Greater London. Established in 1946, the club merged with Finchley in 1991 to form Wingate & Finchley.

== History ==
The club was formed in 1946 by Maurice Rebak, Harvey Sadow, Frank Davis, George Hyams and Asher Rebak, who aimed to create a Jewish club with the aim of fighting antisemitism. It was named after Orde Wingate, who had been involved in training the Haganah, the precursor to the Israel Defense Forces.

They started playing in the Middlesex Senior League, and were founder members of the Parthenon League in 1951, winning the league in its first season. In 1952 they joined the Premier Division of the London League, where they remained for ten years until joining the Delphian League in 1962. Their first season in the league saw the league programme abandoned due to the weather and an emergency competition arranged, in which they finished seventh out of eight clubs. At the end of the season the league merged with and became Division Two of the Athenian League. During their time in the Athenian league the club represented Great Britain in the Maccabiah Games.

In 1972 the club's Hall Lane ground was demolished to make way for an extension of the M1 motorway and they moved to Finchley's Summers Lane ground. In 1975, they merged with Leyton to form Leyton-Wingate.

In 1984 the club was re-established and joined Division One of the Herts County League. They won the division at the first attempt, and were promoted to the Premier Division. In 1987–88 the club won the Herts Senior Centenary Trophy. In 1989 they joined Division One of the South Midlands League, and after finishing second in their first season, were promoted to the Premier Division.

After one season in the Premier Division they merged with Finchley to form Wingate & Finchley. The new club took Wingate's place in the South Midlands League, but played at Finchley's ground, which was renamed the Harry Abrahams Stadium in honour of a long-term Wingate supporter.

== Colours ==
The club wore all royal blue.

== Honours ==
- Parthenon League
  - Champions 1951–52
- Herts County League
  - Division One champions 1984–85
- Herts Senior Centenary Trophy
  - Winners 1987–88
