= New Recreation Ground =

Football stadium in Grays, Essex, England

- The Rec, New Rec, Bridge Road
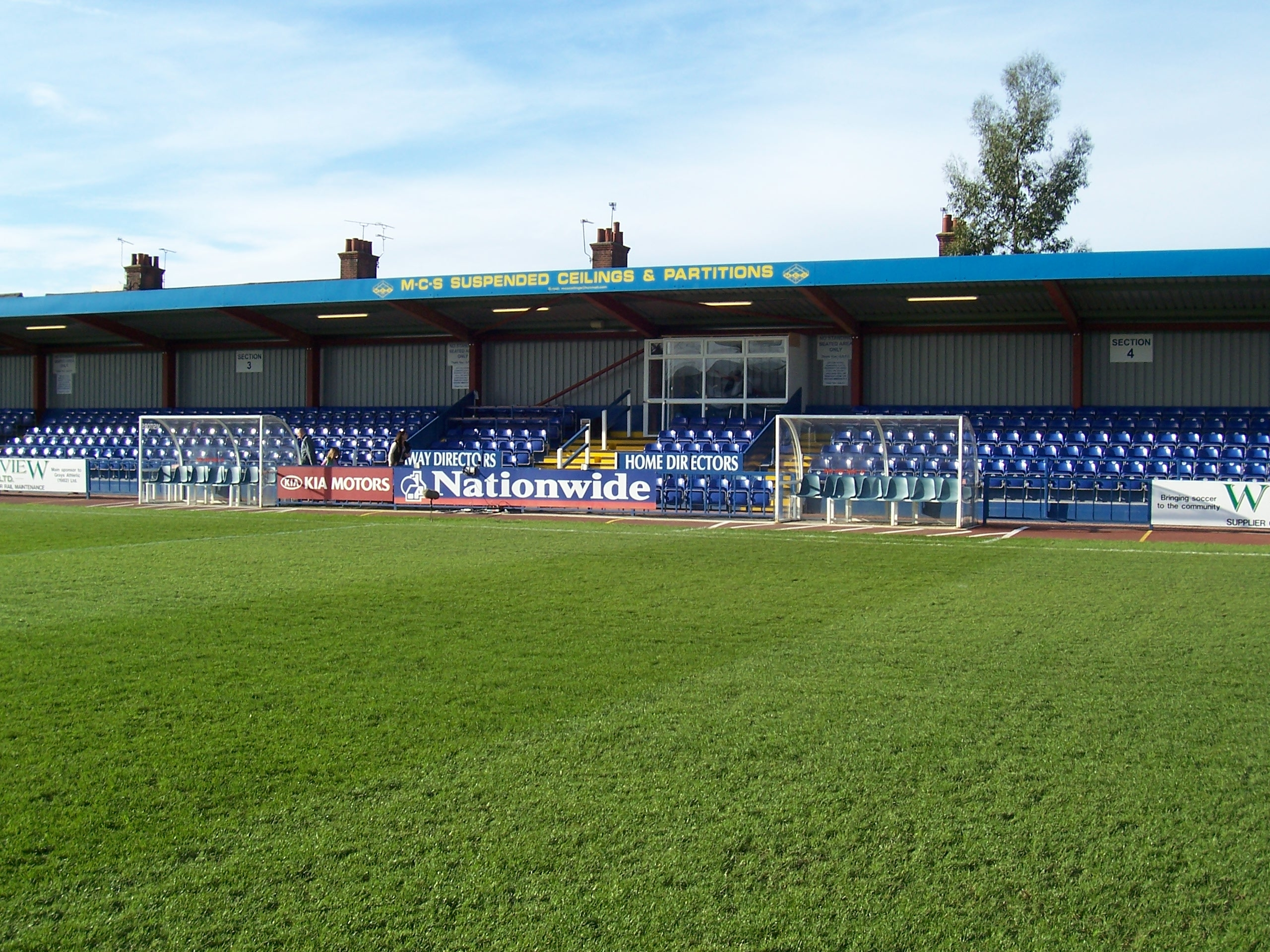
- Interactive map of New Recreation Ground
- Former names: Recreation Ground
- Location: Grays, Essex, England
- Coordinates: 51°28′35.57″N 0°19′46.86″E
- Owner: The Billings Family
- Capacity: 4,100 (1,000 seated)
- Surface: Grass
- Record attendance: 9,500

Construction
- Renovated: 2004
- Closed: 2010
- Demolished: 2010

Tenants
- Grays United (until 1906); Grays Athletic (1906–2010)

The New Recreation Ground was a football stadium on Bridge Road, Grays, Essex, England, and was the home ground of Grays Athletic. Prior to it being closed, the capacity stood at 4,100, of which 1,000 was seated.

Grays Athletic moved to the ground, originally known as the Recreation Ground in 1906. Previously the ground had been home to Southern League club Grays United, but they had merged into Athletic. The record attendance of 9,500 was set in 1959 during an FA Cup tie with Chelmsford City. In 1981 the Club Patron, Mr. Ron Billings, ensured the future of Grays Athletic at the Rec by purchasing the ground.

The ground was redeveloped at the beginning of the 2004–05 season in order to meet the standards set by the Football Conference, and was renamed the New Recreation Ground, often nicknamed The New Rec.

Below the bar area was an indoor 5-a-side AstroTurf pitch. This was hired out to the public and also hosts various community schemes. After the death of Ron Billings, the club was unable to negotiate viable terms for a new lease with the Billings family, and the ground was redeveloped for housing. Grays Athletic had planned to move to a new stadium, but at the end of the 2009–10 season announced they would groundshare at East Thurrock United's Rookery Hill.
