= Bishop's Stortford F.C. =

Association football club in England

Coordinates: 51°52′21″N 0°11′31″E

Bishop's Stortford
- Full name: Bishop's Stortford Football Club
- Nickname: The Blues
- Founded: 28 January 1874
- Ground: Woodside Park, Bishop's Stortford
- Capacity: 4,525 (525 seated)
- Chairman: Ian Kettridge
- Manager: Steve Castle
- League: Southern League Premier Division Central
- 2024–25: Southern League Premier Division Central, 15th of 22
- Website: bsfc.co.uk
Home colours	Away colours	Third colours

Bishop's Stortford Football Club is a football club based in Bishop's Stortford, Hertfordshire, England. They are currently members of the Southern League Premier Division Central and play at Woodside Park.

== History ==
The club was established at the Chequers Hotel on 28 January 1874. Initially playing in crimson and green, their first match was played two weeks later, losing 2–1 to East of England Nonconformist Grammar School. In 1885 they were founders of the Hertfordshire County Football Association, and subsequently started playing in local leagues in the 1890s. They joined the Stansted & District League, winning it in 1910–11 and 1912–13, and also entered a team in the Saffron Walden & District League during the same era, winning it in 1911–12, 1912–13 and 1913–14.

After World War I Bishop's Stortford won both the Stansted & District League and the East Hertfordshire League in 1919–20. In 1921 they joined the North-Eastern Division of the Hertfordshire County League. In 1923 the league was reduced to a single division, and it disbanded entirely in 1925, making a brief comeback in 1926–27, when Stortford were one of only six clubs to play in it. In 1929 they joined the new Division Two East of the Spartan League, which they went on to win in 1931–32, earning promotion to Division One.

Following World War II, the league resumed in 1945, with Bishop's Stortford in the Eastern Division. Despite finishing in last place in 1945–46, they were placed in the Premier Division the following season. However, after finishing bottom of the Premier Division in 1948–49, they were relegated to Division One. In 1951 the club were founder members of the Delphian League, which they won in 1954–55. After the league was disbanded in 1963 they joined Division Two of the Athenian League, winning Division One in 1965–66 and the Premier Division in 1969–70.

In the 1970–71 season Bishop's Stortford reached the first round of the FA Cup for the first time, losing 6–1 at Reading. In 1971 the club joined to the Isthmian League, and in 1973 they reached the second round of the FA Cup, losing 3–1 at Peterborough United after a replay. They also reached the semi-finals of the FA Amateur Cup, losing 1–0 to Slough Town. However, the following season they won the final edition of the cup, beating Ilford 4–1 at Wembley. In 1974–75 they reached the FA Cup first round again, but lost 2–0 at Leatherhead in a replay. The following season they reached the second round again, losing 2–0 at Aldershot.

In 1977–78 Bishop's Stortford finished bottom of the Isthmian League Premier Division, and were relegated to Division One. They returned after winning Division One in 1980–81, a season in which they also won the FA Trophy with a 1–0 win over Sutton United at Wembley, becoming the first club to win both the FA Amateur Cup and the FA Trophy. In 1982–83 the club beat Football League opposition in the FA Cup for the first time, winning 2–1 at Reading in the first round. After beating Slough Town 4–1 in the second round, they held Second Division Middlesbrough to a 2–2 draw at Ayresome Park, before losing 2–1 at home. They reached the first round again in 1984–85, 1985–86 and 1986–87, but failed to progress on each occasion, with the club losing to Brentford, Peterborough United and Colchester United respectively.

Bishop's Stortford finished bottom of the Premier Division in 1991–92, and were relegated back to Division One. They returned as champions in 1993–94, but were relegated again in 1998–99. After a second-place finish in 2001–02 the club returned to the Premier Division, and after finishing eleventh in 2003–04, were placed in the newly formed Conference South. The 2003–04 season also saw them reach the FA Cup first round again, eventually losing 6–0 at Mansfield Town. In 2006–07 another first round appearance resulted in a 5–3 defeat to King's Lynn. Rushden & Diamonds' expulsion from the Football Conference led to the club being transferred to the Conference North in 2011. In 2012–13 they reached the FA Cup first round for the twelfth time, losing 2–1 at home to Hastings United. At the end of the season they were transferred back to the Conference South, and the following season saw another FA Cup first round appearance, a 2–1 defeat at home to Northampton Town.

Stortford were relegated to the Premier Division of the Southern League at the end of the 2016–17 season after finishing second-from-bottom of the renamed National League South. The club were transferred to the Premier Division of the Isthmian League a year for the 2018–19 season. In 2020–21 they reached the first round of the FA Cup, losing 3–2 on penalties at Brackley Town after a 3–3 draw. The 2021–22 season saw the club finish as runners-up in the Premier Division, before losing 3– to Cheshunt in the play-off final. They went on to win the Premier Division title in 2022–23, earning promotion to the National League North. However, they finished bottom of the division the following season and were relegated to the Premier Division Central of the Southern League.

== Ground ==
The club initially played home matches at Silver Leys, which they shared with the polo club. In 1897 they moved to the playing fields of the Grammar School on Hadham Road, remaining there until moving to Havers Lane in 1900 and Laundry Field on Dunmow Road in 1903.

Following World War I, local businessman Joe Brazier allowed the club to start playing at a piece of land near South Road, which became known as Brazier's Field and later the Town Ground. The ground was opened on 4 October 1919 with a match against Ware in front of a crowd of 400, which saw Stortford win 2–1. A wooden pavilion was later erected on site, having been moved from Silver Leys. In 1927 the club bought the land from Brazier, and a wooden stand was built in 1931.

Covered terracing was installed behind both goals in the 1950s, and a new 250-seat main stand was built in 1961. Some uncovered terracing was added alongside the main stand in 1968. Floodlights were installed in 1967, and the following year saw the ground renamed the George Wilson Stadium after a former chairman, although by then the ground was commonly known as simply Rhodes Avenue. Due to financial problems, the club sold the ground in 1997, with the last match played against Ware in December that year. Mirroring the result in the first-ever game at the ground, Stortford won 2–1.

After eighteen months groundsharing at Boreham Wood, Dagenham & Redbridge, Hitchin Town, St Albans City and Ware, the club returned to Bishop's Stortford in 1999 when Woodside Park was completed. The first match was played on 17 July 1999, a friendly against Norwich City. There are seated stands on either side of the pitch, with covered terracing at each end.

== Coaching staff ==
Position	Name
Manager	Steve Castle
Assistant Manager	Dan Evans

== Boardroom staff ==
Position	Name
Chairman	Ian Kettridge
Club Secretary	Fred Plume
Directors	Steve Smith; Ronnie Irani; Paul Hopkins; Fred Plume Alan Hazell
General Manager	Andrew Kovan

== Honours ==
- FA Amateur Cup
  - Winners 1973–74
- FA Trophy
  - Winners 1980–81
- Isthmian League
  - Premier Division Champions 2022–23
  - Division One champions 1980–81, 1993–94
- Athenian League
  - Premier Division Champions 1969–70
  - Division One champions 1965–66
- Spartan League
  - Division Two East Champions 1931–32
- Delphian League
  - Champions 1954–55
- Stansted & District League
  - Champions 1910–11, 1912–13, 1919–20
- Saffron Walden & District League
  - Champions 1911–12, 1912–13, 1913–14
- East Herts League
  - Division One Champions 1919–20
- Herts Senior Cup
  - Winners 1932–33, 1958–59, 1959–60, 1963–64, 1970–71, 1972–73, 1973–74, 1975–76, 1986–87, 2005–06, 2009–10, 2011–12
- London Senior Cup
  - Winners 1973–74

== Records ==
- Best FA Cup performance: Third round, 1982–83 (replay)
- Best FA Trophy performance: Winners, 1980–81
- Best FA Amateur Cup performance: Winners, 1973–74
- Record attendance: 6,000 vs Peterborough United, FA Cup second round, 1972–73; vs Middlesbrough, FA Cup third round replay, 1982–83
- Biggest victory: 11–0 vs Nettleswell & Buntwill, Herts Junior Cup, 1911
- Heaviest defeat: 13–0 vs Cheshunt, Herts Senior Cup, 1926
- Most appearances: Phil Hopkins, 543
- Most goals: Jimmy Badock, 123 (postwar)

== See also ==
- Bishop's Stortford F.C. players
- Bishop's Stortford F.C. managers
