= Letchworth F.C. =

- Full name: Letchworth Football Club
- Dissolved: 2002

Letchworth F.C. was a football club based at Baldock Road, Letchworth in Hertfordshire, England, that resigned from the Spartan South Midlands League and folded in 2002. Originally known as Letchworth Athletic and Letchworth Town, they changed their name to Letchworth Garden City in 1976, before becoming just Letchworth in 1995.

== History ==
After spending their early history in local Hertfordshire leagues, they moved up to the Delphian League in 1956, up to the Corinthian League in 1959, and when that league disbanded in 1963, joined the expanding Athenian League. In the 1974–75 season they won the Athenian League. The following season they joined the Isthmian League Division Two, and for the next twelve years were consistent finishing in the top eight on six occasions. Notable names to emerge from Letchworth during the late 1970s were Paul Bowgett who signed for Tottenham Hotspur, Imre Varadi (Sheffield United), Keith Larner (Sheffield United), and in 1989 striker Kevin Smith who signed for Crystal Palace. Smith later rejoined the club and was top goalscorer for three seasons before moving on. Particularly memorable matches during the 1980s included a cup semi-final against local rivals Stevenage Borough when Letchworth came out 3–2 winners in front of the biggest crowd at Baldock Road for many years.

By the late 1980s the club had entered a period of decline, and the established close-knit team had begun to break up, age and injuries taking their inevitable toll. From a respectable 11th in 1987–88 they finished one place off the bottom next season and were rock-bottom of Division 2 North in 89–90. Relegation was decided by a two leg play-off against Division Two South Horsham played home and away on consecutive nights, they drew the home leg, lost the away leg and their relegation from the league was confirmed.

In 1990–91 the team played in the South Midlands League Premier Division, a step down in standards. They finished 6th in their first season, thereby missing the chance to immediately regain their previous status, and from thereon the decline continued at a dramatic rate. The next four seasons were poor, and they were relegated again at the end of the 1994–95 season. Following a brief rejuvenation with an injection of cash and under the management of ex-Chelsea and England star Kerry Dixon they reached the 4th round of the FA Vase in 1999-00, but a dispute with the Hertfordshire FA saw the club go under in 2002.

The Baldock Road ground has undergone substantial upgrading and refurbishment to a high quality and is currently the headquarters of the Hertfordshire FA. It was announced in April 2008 that the reformed Baldock Town will play there from the 2008–09 season.
