= Stompond Lane Sports Ground =

Stadium in Walton-on-Thames, Surrey, England

The Sports Ground
- Stompond Lane
- Interactive map of The Sports Ground
- Full name: The Sports Ground, Stompond Lane
- Location: Stompond Lane, Walton-on-Thames, Surrey, England
- Coordinates: 51°22′44.53″N 0°24′53.19″W
- Capacity: 2,000 (444 seated)

Tenants
- Walton & Hersham F.C. (Isthmian League Division One South), Walton Athletic Club

The Sports Ground, Stompond Lane (also called Stompond Lane Sports Ground, but often just shortened to Stompond Lane) was a stadium located in Walton-on-Thames, Surrey. It was where Walton & Hersham F.C. played their home matches and it was also used by the Walton Athletic Club.

== Structure ==
Stompond Lane consisted of a football pitch surrounded by a running track. There was a brick grandstand on the north side, which contained 404 regular seats and 40 in the two directors' boxes. The seats had to be accessed by stairways because the dressing rooms were beneath them. On the opposite side of the pitch was a covered terrace and there was uncovered terracing surrounding the east side of the track.

== Closure ==
On 19 September 2017, Stompond Lane was used for the last time to host Walton & Hersham F.C. After this game, the existing structures were demolished to make way for a development of 54 new houses, and Walton & Hersham F.C relocated to the new Elmbridge Sports Hub in Waterside Drive.
