= Rainham Town F.C. =

Rainham Town
- Full name: Rainham Town Football Club
- Founded: 1945
- Dissolved: 1994
- Ground: Deri Park, Rainham
- Chairman: Maureen Haynes
- 1993–94: Isthmian League Division Two, 22/22

Rainham Town F.C. was an English football club based in Rainham, Essex. Their home ground was Deri Park.

== History ==
The club was established in 1945 and initially played at the Rainham Working Men's Club Ground before moving to Deri Park in 1948. They were founder members of the Delphian League in 1951. In 1961 they transferred to the Metropolitan League, before joining Division Two of the Athenian League in 1964. In 1977 they joined Division Two of the Isthmian League. During the 1993–94 season the club left Deri Park, playing at Purfleet and Aveley. They finished bottom of Division Two and were due to be relegated to Division Three, but resigned from the league and folded.

== Records ==
- Best FA Cup performance: Third qualifying round, 1957–58, 1958–59
- Best FA Vase performance: Fifth round, 1977–78
