= Church Road (football stadium) =

Football stadium in Hayes, England

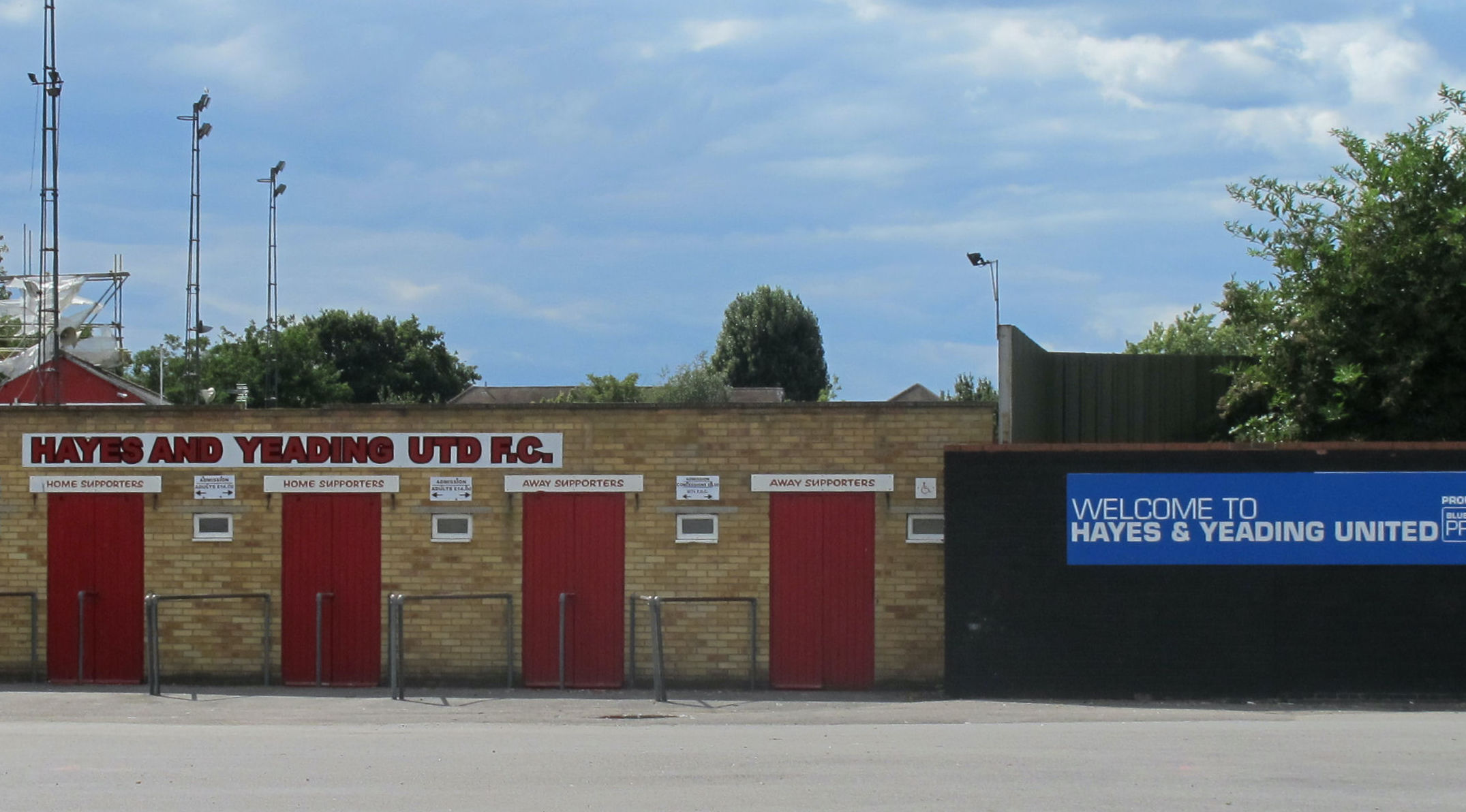
- Home ground up to 19 April 2011
- Interactive map of Church Road
- Location: Hayes, Greater London
- Coordinates: 51°30′54.26″N 0°25′20.04″W
- Capacity: 4,500 (500 seated)
- Surface: Grass
- Record attendance: 15,370

Construction
- Opened: 26 August 1920
- Closed: 19 April 2011
- Demolished: 2011

Tenants
- Hayes (1920–2007); Hayes & Yeading (2007–2011)

Church Road was a 4,500-capacity football stadium in Hayes, England, the home ground of Hayes, and later Hayes & Yeading United, following the two clubs' merger in 2007.

== History ==
After initially playing at Botwell Common, Hayes F.C. (then known as Botwell Mission) moved to the ground in Church Road. The site was originally named Cox's Meadow and later Townfield. It officially opened with a Whites vs. Stripes trial match on 26 August 1920. During World War II, the clubhouse was hit by a bomb dropped by the Luftwaffe. The record attendance at the ground was 15,370 for an FA Amateur Cup match against Bromley in 1951.

Hayes & Yeading United left the ground reluctantly at the end of the 2010–11 season, moving to a purportedly temporary groundshare at Woking's Kingfield Stadium, with the intention of relocating to Yeading's Warren Ground in Beaconsfield Road.

The Church Road stadium was demolished in 2011, to make way for a Barratt Homes housing development.

For some twenty years before its demolition, the spacious carpark at the front of the former stadium was the site of a popular local community market on Wednesdays and Fridays each week.
