= Horsham F.C. =

Association football club in England

Coordinates: 51°02′49″N 0°20′26″W

Horsham
- Full name: Horsham Football Club
- Nickname: The Hornets
- Founded: 1881
- Ground: Hop Oast Stadium, Horsham
- Capacity: 3,000
- Chairman: Kevin Borrett
- Manager: Dominic Di Paola
- League: National League South
- 2025–26: National League South, 15th of 24
- Website: horshamfc.co.uk
Home colours	Away colours

Horsham Football Club is a semi-professional football club based in Horsham, West Sussex, England, currently playing in the National League South.

== History ==
The first Horsham Football Club was founded in 1870, and played its first match against Reigate Priory at the Springfield meadow in 1871, though its existence largely depended upon enough players being available to form a side. In 1881 the club was firmly re-established, playing its first game against Dorking, and, in September 1882, helped found the Sussex County Football Association, with club official A. R. Bostock becoming one of three original Vice Presidents. Horsham became founder members of the West Sussex Football League in 1896. They went on to win the West Sussex League championship in 1899–1900, 1900–01 and 1901–02, and claimed the Royal Irish Rifles Cup in 1900 by defeating the champions of the East Sussex Senior League, Hastings. After having played at both Hurst Park and Springfield Park, the club secured Queen Street as its permanent home in 1904, but some lean form over the ensuing years saw Horsham overlooked when the Sussex County League was created in 1920.

=== Sussex County League ===
The club eventually became members of the Sussex County League after winning the West Sussex Senior League for the fourth time in 1925–26. It won the County League in 1932, 1933, 1935, 1936, 1937 and 1938, with the team regularly scoring over one hundred goals a season. The Sussex RUR Cup was taken in 1931, 1932, 1934, 1935, 1936, 1937 and 1938, and the Sussex Senior Cup in 1934 and 1939. After the break brought on by hostilities, Horsham won the first post-war title in 1947, the RUR Cup in 1946, 1949 and 1951, and the Sussex Senior Cup in 1950.

In 1947–48 Horsham reached the First Round Proper of the FA Cup for the first time, taking a first-minute lead against Tommy Lawton's Notts County, before losing 9–1.

=== Metropolitan and Athenian League ===
For many years Horsham had been looking to test themselves at a higher level but had seen their annual applications to join the Athenian League come to nothing. In 1951 the club changed tack and successfully applied to become members of the Metropolitan League where they were champions at the first attempt. In 1957, however, after finishing bottom of the table, they stepped down to the Corinthian League. In 1963 this league was disbanded, and Horsham were finally able to join the Athenian League.

In 1966 they reached the First Round proper of the FA Cup for a second time after defeating Hastings United 2–1 in the 4th Qualifying Round. Horsham played Swindon Town in front of a crowd of 7,134 at Queen Street. Although they lost 0–3, the day was a 'red letter day' for the club. A special temporary stand was erected at the Queen Street end of the ground for the match.

=== Isthmian League ===
In 1973, Horsham joined the Isthmian League when it expanded to two divisions. They enjoyed little success during the 1980s and early 1990s, finishing bottom of the entire league in 1993–94, but began to turn their fortunes around with a Division Three championship win in 1995–96. In 2001–02 they finished second in Division Two and were promoted to Division One South and in 2005–06 a second-place finish in that division, finishing 2nd behind champions Ramsgate on goal difference, saw them promoted to the Premier Division for the first time. That same season, Horsham reached the final of the Sussex Senior Cup for the first time since 1979, but were beaten by Lewes 3–1 after extra-time.

Their first ever season in the Premier Division, in 2006–07, saw the Hornets finish in eighth and a promotion challenge in 2007–08 again fell away to see the club end up eleventh. However, the team beat Maidenhead United 4–1 to reach the Second Round Proper of the FA Cup for the first time where two matches were played against eventual League One champions, Swansea City.

=== Ground moves ===
Having sold their ground for redevelopment at the end of the season, Horsham played at Worthing during 2008–09 and reached the 4th Qualifying Round of the FA Cup where they took Conference side Stevenage Borough to a replay before ending an injury-ravaged year in thirteenth place. The 2009–10 season started with Kevin Borrett appointed chairman and one of the first actions of the new board was to bring the club back to Horsham, having entered into a groundshare agreement with their old neighbours Horsham YMCA whilst HFC's quest for a new ground continued. Financial cutbacks at the end of the 2010–11 campaign, during which they finished only 6 points clear of possible relegation back to Division One, saw Horsham part company with long serving manager John Maggs after 11 years in charge. Former Faversham Town manager, Justin Luchford, was appointed as his replacement in June 2011 but left the role in late October 2011 and was replaced by assistant, Hugo Langton. A lack of improvement in results, during which the club failed to win any of their 19 league games, saw Langton replaced by former Worthing boss Simon Colbran in March 2012 but he was unable to prevent the side from returning to Division One South. A season of stability followed, with the Hornets ending the campaign in fifteenth and claiming the Brighton Charity Cup for a second successive season but Colbran resigned his post in November 2013 with the club in 18th position. His departure led to the popular appointment of Horsham born Gary Charman, some fifteen years after making the first of more than 550 appearances for his hometown club. Charman steered the club to 16th place but a poor run of results the following season led to him being replaced by two more former players, Anthony Storey and Cliff Cant, in January 2015. Despite some impressive initial results, the pair were unable to save the club from relegation so former East Preston manager Dominic di Paola was appointed towards the end of the campaign with a view to rebuilding a side capable of competing in the Sussex County League for the first time since 1951.

After a season-long battle with Eastbourne Town, Horsham took the title by eleven points to secure a record-equalling eighth County League title, thus securing an immediate return to the Isthmian League. During that 2015/16 campaign, the club recorded a club record ninety-seven points whilst conceding the fewest goals in their history (twenty-two). After a slow start to the 2016/17 campaign, in which just three of the first thirteen matches were won, the Hornets recovered to finish in a not unsatisfactory sixteenth place in Division One South.

=== Temporary ground ===
On 21 March 2017, a revised ground application was submitted and overwhelmingly approved by HDC, meaning work could finally begin on constructing a new community stadium off the Worthing Road.

With the arrangement at YMCA having come to an end, Horsham moved into the Sussex FA Headquarters at Lancing's Culver Road in the summer of 2017 but a crippling injury list put paid to any pre-season expectations of improving the club's position, with the low point of the season coming in an 8-0 reverse at Cray Wanderers in what is the club's heaviest ever FA Trophy defeat. Yet that result proved the catalyst for the side to kick on and only six of the next nineteen matches ended in defeat, a run that lifted Horsham to eleventh in the table, only to fall away again in the closing months of the season before ending in fifteenth spot, one better than the previous year.

Hopes that the club might start the 2018–19 campaign in the new ground went unfulfilled but the disappointment did not seem to affect the players who turned Culver Road into something of a fortress, losing just four matches in all competitions – two of them to higher-league opponents Bath City and Eastbourne Borough. Overdue runs to the latter stages of the qualifying rounds in both the FA Cup and FA Trophy bred confidence that was transferred into their league form and, from early December, the Hornets never dropped below fourth place, finally finishing as runners-up to Cray Wanderers. With automatic promotion the right of only the champions, Horsham faced a play-off semi-final clash with Haywards Heath Town – the only side to have recorded a league double over them during the campaign – and duly won 3–0 to set up a home final with Ashford United. After a tense tie, played in front of over eight hundred spectators, Horsham won through 2–1 after extra-time to return to the Premier Division after an absence of seven years.

=== Hop Oast ===
The club was finally able to move to its new ground - christened the Hop Oast Stadium - in 2019. Club president Frank King died in May 2019 and the new boardroom was dedicated in his memory.

The 2021–22 season was the first fully completed campaign at the new ground, after the previous two had been cut short by the Covid outbreak, and Horsham made their fourth appearance in the FA Cup first round, losing 2–0 to Carlisle United. The team ended the season with silverware after beating Margate 4–0 to earn the Isthmian League Cup for the first time. In the following season the team achieved a best-ever league placing of 7th, missing out on a play-off spot by just two points. In addition, the club topped the division's attendance charts with an average of 920.

In 2023-24, Horsham reached the first round of the FA Cup where they were drawn away to Barnsley. The tie finished 3-3, and as a result, a live televised replay was played in Horsham on 14 November 2023 where Horsham lost 3–0 in front of a record and Hop Oast home capacity maximum attendance of 3,000. However, Horsham would receive a new lease of life, as Barnsley fielded a player in the replay who had been on loan at York City at the time of the first meeting, thus making him ineligible. Barnsley were subsequently expelled and Horsham replaced them in the second round where they were drawn at Sutton United, ultimately falling for a second time in that year's competition, losing 3–0. In the FA Trophy, the Hornets reached the last thirty-two of the competition for the first time and ended the campaign with silverware when lifting the Sussex Senior Cup for the first time since 1976. There was heartbreak in the league, though, when they again created a record by finishing a club best fifth in the Isthmian Premier Division only to lose out to Chatham Town on penalties in the Play-Off semi-final.

The 2024-25 season proved to be the most successful in the club’s history. Horsham once again reached the first round proper of the FA Cup, beating Virginia Water, Dorking Wanderers, Margate and Gorleston in the qualifying rounds before being beaten 3-1 in the first round, away at League Two Chesterfield. Later in the season, Horsham clinched the Isthmian League title on the final day, finishing level on points with Billericay Town but with one higher goal difference. Horsham started the day in second with one fewer goal difference than Billericay, however even though Billericay beat Cheshunt 4-2, Horsham beat Hashtag United 5-1 to win the title and achieve promotion to the National League South for the first time in their 144-year history. Horsham then went on to win the Sussex Senior Cup for the second season in a row, beating Littlehampton Town 1–0 with the single goal being a free-kick goal from James Hammond in the 6th minute of stoppage time.

=== National League South ===
The 2025–26 season was one of consolidation for the Hornets, following their promotion to the National League South. Horsham finished the season in 15th place, having accrued 59 points. Horsham also enjoyed an unprecedented FA Trophy run, the highlight being a 2–1 away victory over Scunthorpe United. Their campaign ultimately ended at the quarter final stage, where they were beaten 2–1 at home by Southend United.

== Ground ==
The Hop Oast Stadium, currently known for sponsorship purposes as the Fusion Aviation Community Stadium has been the home stadium of Horsham F.C. since 2019 after they moved out of their old Queen Street stadium in 2008.

The club sold their ground at Queen Street, which had been their home since 1904, to property developers and moved out in 2008. A two-season groundshare with Worthing was terminated after one season. The club hoped to return to Horsham and build a new ground in Holbrook, North Horsham, but despite the club having bought the site, planning permission was refused at a council meeting held on 1 July 2008. The club withdrew their appeal against the decision on 15 April 2009, and turned their focus instead to building a new ground at the "Hop Oast" area to the south of Horsham.

The initial proposal, which would have seen the installation of two 3G pitches and a two-storey clubhouse, returned a majority verdict of 13–9 in favour of rejecting the application at a council hearing on 20 Jan 2015, citing issues such as safety concerns and the perceived construction of a 'business in the countryside', despite the site already hosting a golf club and fitness centre. On 21 March 2017 the submission of a revised plan for a single-storey clubhouse and suitable for a FA Grading Category "C" with an initial capacity of 1,980 was overwhelmingly accepted by 19 votes to 1. A separate application to sell off part of The Holbrook Club site for housing to help finance the building of the new ground, as well as securing the long-term future of the Sports Club, was also passed.

Hop Oast Stadium 2026

Pre-match at the Hop Oast Stadium

With Horsham YMCA announcing their intention to end the groundshare arrangement at the end of the 2016–17 season, Horsham FC signed a contract to play their home matches at the headquarters of the Sussex FA at Culver Road, Lancing, an arrangement that lasted for two seasons while the new ground was built. Following its completion in June 2019, a minimum three-year sponsorship deal was agreed with Camping World for naming rights. The first match at Hop Oast Stadium (known for sponsorship reasons as The Camping World Community Stadium) was played on 13 July 2019, a friendly fixture versus Hartley Wintney, with the official opening of the stadium taking place a week later when Crawley Town were the visitors. The first competitive fixture saw Horsham and Leatherhead draw 1–1 in an Isthmian League Premier Division match on 10 August 2019. In March 2020, the stadium was named Best New Non-League Ground by Groundtastic magazine.

== Current squad ==
As of 24 October 2026

Note: Flags indicate national team as defined under FIFA eligibility rules; some limited exceptions apply. Players may hold more than one non-FIFA nationality.

No.	Pos.	Nation	Player
1	GK	ENG	Will Heater
2	DF	ENG	Jake Elliott
3	DF	ENG	Harvey Sparks
4	MF	ENG	Charlie Hester-Cook
5	MF	ENG	Ronan Silva
6	DF	ENG	George Cox
7	MF	ENG	James Hammond (vice-captain)
8	MF	ENG	Danny Barker
9	FW	ENG	Ashley Nadesan
10	FW	ENG	Jimmy Wild
11	MF	ENG	Jamie Yila

No.	Pos.	Nation	Player
12	FW	ENG	Greg Luer
13	GK	ENG	Sam Howes
14	MF	ENG	Niall McManus
15	MF	ENG	Jack Brivio (captain)
16	MF	ENG	Marco Haigh
17	DF	ENG	Archy Taylor
18	MF	ENG	Reece Myles-Meekums
19	DF	ENG	Ryan Bartley
20	MF	ENG	Lee Harding
22	DF	ENG	Freddie Hammond
28	FW	ENG	Daniel Ajakaiye

== Management ==
Position	Name
Manager	Dominic Di Paola
Coach	Jimmy Punter
Coach	Sami El-Abd
Coach	Rob Chapman
Goalkeeping Coach	Ross Standen
Physio	Marco Fernandes
Kitman	Darren Etheridge

== Honours ==
=== League and Cup honours ===
- West Sussex Senior League
  - Winners (4): 1899–1900, 1900–01, 1901–02, 1925–26
- Sussex County League
  - Winners (7): 1931–32, 1932–3, 1934–35, 1936–37, 1937–38, 1946–47
- Southern Combination Football League
  - Winners (1): 2015–16 (Premier Division)
- Metropolitan League
  - Winners (1): 1951–52
- Athenian League
  - Winners (2): 1972–73 (Division One), 1969–70 (Division Two)
- Isthmian League
  - Winners (2): 1995–96 (Division Three), 2024–25 (Premier Division)
  - Runners-up (2): 2005–06 (Division One), 2018-19 (Division One South East)
  - Play-off final winners: 2018-19 (Division One South East)
- Sussex Senior Cup
  - Winners (9): 1933–34, 1938–39, 1949–50, 1953–54, 1971–72, 1973–74, 1975–76, 2023–24, 2024-25
  - Runners-up (8): 1947–48, 1954–55, 1960–61, 1966–67, 1967–68, 1968–69, 1978–79, 2005–06
- Isthmian League Cup
  - Winners: 2021–22
- Isthmian League Charity Shield
  - Winners: 2025-26
- Sussex Floodlight Cup
  - Winners (2): 1977–78, 2001–02
- The Sussex Royal Ulster Rifles Charity Cup
  - Winners (13): 1899–1900, 1930–31, 1931–32, 1933–34 (shared with Worthing), 1934–35, 1935–36, 1936–37, 1937–38 (shared with Southwick), 1945–46, 1948–49, 1950–51, 1951–52, 1956–57
  - Runners Up (3): 1900–01, 1901–02, 1947–48
- Brighton Charity Cup
  - Winners (6): 1967–68, 2002–03, 2003–04, 2006–07, 2007–08, 2011–12, 2012–13

== Club records ==
- Best league performance: 15th in National League South, 2025-26
- Best FA Cup performance: 2nd round, 2007–08, 2023–24
- Best FA Trophy performance: Quarter-finals, 2025–26
- Best FA Vase performance: 4th round, 1986–87
- Record attendance: @ Queen Street: 7,134 v Swindon Town 26 November 1966, @ Hop Oast 3,000 v Barnsley 14 November 2023
- Record transfer fee received: £10,000 from Tonbridge Angels for Carl Rook (December 2008)
- Record transfer fee paid: £7,500 to Whitehawk for Lucas Rodrigues (August 2021 & 2025)
- Most appearances: Gary Charman 616 (1998–2022)
- Most goals in a match: Mick Streeter (9) v Portslade (Sussex Senior Cup) 17.11.1962
- Record victory: 16–2 v Southwick (Sussex County League) 03.11.1945
- Record defeat: 0–12 v Worthing (West Sussex County League) 13.02.1909

== See also ==
- Horsham F.C. players
