= 1955–56 Spartan League =

Spartan League
- Season: 1955–56

The 1955–56 Spartan League season was the 38th in the history of Spartan League. The league consisted of 15 teams.

== League table ==
Spartan League
- Season: 1955–56
- Champions: Briggs Sports
- Promoted: Letchworth Town
- Relegated: None

The division featured 15 teams, 14 from last season and 1 new team:

- Welwyn Garden City, from London League

Pos	Team	Pld	W	D	L	GF	GA	GR	Pts	Promotion
1	Briggs Sports (C)	28	23	2	3	117	26	4.500	48	
2	Hertford Town	28	22	4	2	93	26	3.577	48	
3	Huntley & Palmers	28	18	4	6	82	50	1.640	40	
4	Histon	28	15	4	9	83	65	1.277	34	
5	Wolverton Town & B.R.	28	16	1	11	58	60	0.967	33	
6	Letchworth Town (P)	28	13	6	9	73	58	1.259	32	Promotion to Delphian League
7	Metropolitan Police	28	12	7	9	66	59	1.119	31	
8	Marlow	28	12	7	9	53	50	1.060	31	
9	Harrow Town	28	12	4	12	75	71	1.056	28	
10	Vauxhall Motors	28	8	7	13	58	67	0.866	23	
11	Welwyn Garden City	28	7	5	16	50	79	0.633	19	
12	Ford Sports	28	7	4	17	29	61	0.475	18	
13	Wood Green Town	28	5	4	19	50	87	0.575	14	
14	Hoddesdon Town	28	6	2	20	38	88	0.432	14	
15	Tring Town	28	2	3	23	28	106	0.264	7	

Rules for classification: 1) points; 2) goal ratio.
(C) Champions; (P) Promoted
