= 1950–51 Spartan League =

Spartan League
- Season: 1950–51

The 1950–51 Spartan League season was the 33rd in the history of Spartan League. The league consisted of 14 teams.

== League table ==
Spartan League
- Season: 1950–51
- Champions: Yiewsley
- Promoted: Yiewsley; Aylesbury United; Berkhamsted; Slough Centre; Brentwood & Warley; Willesden

The division featured 14 teams, 11 from last season and 3 new teams:

- Yiewsley
- Berkhamsted
- Hertford Town

Pos	Team	Pld	W	D	L	GF	GA	GR	Pts	Qualification
1	Yiewsley (C, P)	26	18	4	4	87	37	2.351	40	Founder member of Delphian League
2	Briggs Sports	26	16	3	7	68	25	2.720	35	
3	Aylesbury United (P)	26	15	5	6	70	37	1.892	35	Founder member of Delphian League
4	Metropolitan Police	26	13	5	8	78	53	1.472	31	
5	Wolverton Town & B.R.	26	12	6	8	70	67	1.045	30	
6	Huntley & Palmers	26	14	0	12	70	62	1.129	28	
7	Berkhamsted (P)	26	11	4	11	49	50	0.980	26	Founder member of Delphian League
8	Letchworth Town	26	11	2	13	59	66	0.894	24	
9	Slough Centre (P)	26	11	2	13	41	66	0.621	24	Founder member of Delphian League
10	Brentwood & Warley (P)	26	8	4	14	48	54	0.889	20	Founder member of Delphian League
11	Willesden (P)	26	8	4	14	46	57	0.807	20	Founder member of Delphian League
12	Harrow Town	26	6	5	15	38	66	0.576	17	
13	Hertford Town	26	6	5	15	45	85	0.529	17	
14	Vauxhall Motors	26	8	1	17	43	87	0.494	17	

Rules for classification: 1) points; 2) goal ratio.
(C) Champions; (P) Promoted
