= 1953–54 Spartan League =

Spartan League
- Season: 1953–54

The 1953–54 Spartan League season was the 36th in the history of Spartan League. The league consisted of 16 clubs.

== League table ==
Spartan League
- Season: 1953–54
- Champions: Metropolitan Police
- Promoted: Tufnell Park Edmonton

The division featured 16 clubs, 14 from last season and 2 new clubs:

- Bletchley Town
- Hatfield Town

Pos	Team	Pld	W	D	L	GF	GA	GR	Pts	Promotion or relegation
1	Metropolitan Police (C)	30	25	2	3	103	41	2.512	52	
2	Briggs Sports	30	23	3	4	86	23	3.739	49	
3	Vauxhall Motors	30	16	5	9	76	60	1.267	37	
4	Huntley & Palmers	30	15	5	10	60	51	1.176	35	
5	Ware	30	15	3	12	87	61	1.426	33	
6	Tufnell Park Edmonton (P)	30	14	4	12	69	64	1.078	32	Promotion to Delphian League
7	Wolverton Town & B.R.	30	13	5	12	77	69	1.116	31	
8	Histon	30	10	8	12	60	66	0.909	28	
9	Marlow	30	13	2	15	64	71	0.901	28	
10	Harrow Town	30	10	8	12	57	68	0.838	28	
11	Ford Sports	30	10	5	15	55	64	0.859	25	
12	Hertford Town	30	8	6	16	57	82	0.695	22	
13	Bletchley Town	30	7	8	15	50	74	0.676	22	
14	Wood Green Town	30	7	8	15	42	66	0.636	22	
15	Hoddesdon Town	30	8	3	19	40	86	0.465	19	
16	Hatfield Town	30	6	5	19	49	86	0.570	17	Joined Parthenon League

Source: Non-League Matters
Rules for classification: 1) points; 2) goal ratio.
(C) Champions; (P) Promoted
