= 1957–58 Spartan League =

Spartan League
- Season: 1957–58

The 1957–58 Spartan League season was the 40th in the history of Spartan League. The league consisted of 16 teams.

== League table ==
Spartan League
- Season: 1957–58
- Champions: Briggs Sports
- Promoted: Harrow Town
- Relegated: None

The division featured 16 teams, 14 from last season and 2 new teams:

- Boreham Wood, from Parthenon League
- Rayners Lane, from Parthenon League

Pos	Team	Pld	W	D	L	GF	GA	GR	Pts	Promotion
1	Briggs Sports (C)	30	25	3	2	111	26	4.269	53	
2	Harrow Town (P)	30	22	4	4	94	30	3.133	48	Promotion to Delphian League
3	Vauxhall Motors	30	19	6	5	87	44	1.977	44	
4	Metropolitan Police	30	16	6	8	79	58	1.362	38	
5	Marlow	30	15	5	10	63	60	1.050	35	
6	Wood Green Town	30	13	6	11	76	68	1.118	32	
7	Wolverton Town	30	12	7	11	75	54	1.389	31	
8	Histon	30	14	2	14	65	70	0.929	30	
9	Hertford Town	30	11	8	11	54	69	0.783	30	
10	Boreham Wood	30	13	0	17	70	77	0.909	26	
11	Welwyn Garden City	30	10	5	15	53	62	0.855	25	
12	Tring Town	30	10	3	17	52	96	0.542	23	
13	Hoddesdon Town	30	7	6	17	48	83	0.578	20	
14	Huntley & Palmers	30	6	7	17	64	92	0.696	19	
15	Rayners Lane	30	7	3	20	55	84	0.655	17	
16	Ford Sports	30	0	9	21	29	102	0.284	9	Left the league

Rules for classification: 1) points; 2) goal ratio.
(C) Champions; (P) Promoted
