= List of Walton & Hersham F.C. seasons =

This is a list of seasons played by Walton & Hersham Football Club in English football from the club's formation in 1945 to the present day. It details the club's achievements in major competitions.

== Key ==
Winners	Runners-up	Relegated

Key to league record

- P – games played
- W – games won
- D – games drawn
- L – games lost
- F – goals for
- A – goals against
- Pts – points
- Pos – final position

Key to cup rounds

- DNP – did not participate
- PRE – preliminary round
- QR1 – first qualifying round, etc.
- R1 – first round, etc.
- QF – quarter-finals
- SF – semi-finals

Key to divisions

- CL – Corinthian League
- AL – Athenian League
- ALP – Athenian League Premier Division
- IL – Isthmian League
- ILP – Isthmian League Premier Division
- IL1 – Isthmian League First Division
- IL1s – Isthmian League Division One South
- IL1sc – Isthmian League Division One South Central
- IL2 – Isthmian League Second Division
- CCFLP – Combined Counties Football League Premier Division

== Seasons ==
The FA Amateur Cup and Isthmian League Cup results are incomplete.

Season	League									FA Cup	FA Trophy	Other	
Season	Division	P	W	D	L	F	A	Pts	Pos	FA Cup	FA Trophy	Competition	Result
1945–46	CL	16	5	2	9	31	53	12	7th	QR2	—	—	—
1946–47	CL	24	19	2	3	88	35	40	1st	QR1	—	—	—
1947–48	CL	26	17	4	5	82	40	38	1st	QR1	—	—	—
1948–49	CL	24	19	1	4	82	32	39	1st	QR1	—	—	—
1949–50	CL ↑	26	18	4	4	69	31	40	2nd	QR2	—	—	—
1950–51	AL	30	21	3	6	77	42	45	2nd	QR2	—	FA Amateur Cup	QF
1951–52	AL	30	14	4	12	56	51	32	7th	QR1	—	FA Amateur Cup	SF
1952–53	AL	26	11	3	12	42	36	25	7th	PRE	—	FA Amateur Cup	SF
1953–54	AL	26	9	4	13	32	55	22	10th	PRE	—	FA Amateur Cup	R3
1954–55	AL	26	8	7	11	51	53	23	10th	QR1	—	—	—
1955–56	AL	28	13	3	12	59	68	29	6th	PRE	—	—	—
1956–57	AL	28	8	3	17	43	74	19	14th	—	—	—	—
1957–58	AL	30	5	6	19	45	80	16	16th	R1	—	—	—
1958–59	AL	30	9	4	17	39	61	22	15th	PRE	—	—	—
1959–60	AL	30	8	6	16	49	75	22	14th	PRE	—	—	—
1960–61	AL	30	11	8	11	66	57	30	9th	QR4	—	FA Amateur Cup	QF
1961–62	AL	30	14	6	10	70	55	34	5th	QR3	—	FA Amateur Cup	R3
1962–63	AL	30	15	4	11	66	49	34	6th	QR1	—	FA Amateur Cup	R3
1963–64	ALP	26	13	2	11	52	54	28	7th	QR1	—	—	—
1964–65	ALP	30	16	3	11	69	55	35	5th	QR2	—	—	—
1965–66	ALP	30	9	6	15	56	66	24	11th	QR2	—	—	—
1966–67	ALP	30	10	5	15	46	58	25	13th	QR1	—	—	—
1967–68	ALP	30	13	5	12	51	39	31	8th	QR1	—	—	—
1968–69	ALP	30	24	4	2	79	22	52	1st	QR4	—	—	—
1969–70	ALP	30	16	8	6	56	32	40	2nd	R1	—	FA Amateur Cup	QF
1970–71	ALP ↑	30	20	7	3	56	21	47	2nd	R1	—	—	—
1971–72	IL	40	24	8	8	69	25	56	3rd	QR4	—	FA Amateur Cup	R3
1972–73	IL	42	25	11	6	60	25	61	2nd	R2	—	FA Amateur Cup	W
1973–74	IL1	42	20	12	10	68	50	72	6th	R2	—	FA Amateur Cup	R3
1974–75	IL1 ↓	42	9	4	29	37	108	31	21st	QR4	QR3	—	—
1975–76	IL2	42	14	12	16	61	56	54	14th	R1	QR1	—	—
1976–77	IL2	42	17	9	16	57	56	60	14th	QR4	QR1	—	—
1977–78	IL1	42	22	11	9	69	41	77	4th	QR1	QR1	—	—
1978–79	IL1	42	12	9	21	47	71	45	16th	QR1	PRE	—	—
1979–80	IL1	42	15	12	15	61	50	57	11th	QR3	PRE	—	—
1980–81	IL1	42	12	15	15	46	53	51	13th	QR2	QR1	—	—
1981–82	IL1	40	10	11	19	43	65	41	18th	QR2	PRE	—	—
1982–83	IL1	40	17	6	17	65	59	57	8th	QR1	PRE	—	—
1983–84	IL1	42	13	10	19	52	70	49	17th	QR2	QR3	—	—
1984–85	IL1	42	16	8	18	60	69	55 (Note: Walton & Hersham were deducted one point.)	12th	QR1	QR1	—	—
1985–86	IL1	42	16	10	16	68	71	58	10th	QR2	PRE	—	—
1986–87	IL1	42	11	10	21	53	74	43	18th	QR2	QR2	—	—
1987–88	IL1	42	15	16	11	53	44	61	8th	QR2	QR1	—	—
1988–89	IL1	40	21	7	12	56	36	70	7th	QR4	QR1	—	—
1989–90	IL1	42	20	10	12	68	50	70	5th	QR2	QR2	—	—
1990–91	IL1	42	21	8	13	73	48	71	7th	QR1	QR3	—	—
1991–92	IL1	40	15	13	12	62	50	58	9th	QR1	R1	—	—
1992–93	IL1	40	14	12	14	58	54	54	10th	QR2	QR3	—	—
1993–94	IL1 ↑	42	22	11	9	81	53	77	3rd	PRE	QR1	—	—
1994–95	ILP	42	14	11	17	75	73	53	14th	R1	R1	—	—
1995–96	ILP ↓	42	9	7	26	42	79	34	21st	QR3	QR2	—	—
1996–97	IL1 ↑	42	21	13	8	67	41	76	3rd	QR1	QR1	—	—
1997–98	ILP	42	18	6	18	50	70	60	9th	QR2	QR2	—	—
1998–99	ILP	42	12	7	23	50	77	43	18th	QR3	R1	—	—
1999–2000	ILP ↓	42	11	8	23	44	70	41	22nd	QR2	R4	—	—
2000–01	IL1	42	14	8	20	59	80	50	17th	QR1	R2	—	—
2001–02	IL1	42	16	10	16	75	70	58	13th	QR1	R2	—	—
2002–03	IL1s	46	20	13	13	87	63	73	7th	QR3	R2	—	—
2003–04	IL1s	46	20	14	12	76	55	74	9th	PRE	PRE	—	—
2004–05	IL1 ↑	42	28	4	10	69	34	88	2nd	PRE	R4	Isthmian League Cup	R4
2005–06	ILP	42	19	7	16	55	50	64	9th	QR3	QR1	Isthmian League Cup	R3
2006–07	ILP ↓	42	9	6	27	38	83	33	21st	QR2	QR1	Isthmian League Cup	R2
2007–08	IL1s	42	15	12	15	65	62	57	10th	QR2	QR2	Isthmian League Cup	R2
2008–09	IL1s	42	13	11	18	46	55	50	14th	PRE	QR1	Isthmian League Cup	R2
2009–10	IL1s	42	18	8	16	55	54	62	8th	QR3	QR1	Isthmian League Cup	R4
2010–11	IL1s	42	18	8	16	69	58	62	6th	QR1	PRE	Isthmian League Cup	R2
2011–12	IL1s	40	14	8	18	54	52	50	12th	QR1	PRE	Isthmian League Cup	R3
2012–13	IL1s	42	11	11	20	48	77	44	18th	QR1	QR1	Isthmian League Cup	R2
2013–14	IL1s	46	14	9	23	75	92	51	21st	PRE	PRE	Isthmian League Cup	R2
2014–15	IL1s	46	14	11	21	59	76	52	17th	PRE	QR1	Isthmian League Cup	R3
2015–16	IL1s ↓	46	9	6	31	50	113	30 (Note: Walton & Hersham were deducted three points for fielding an ineligible player against Whitstable Town on 8 August 2015.)	22nd	PRE	PRE	Alan Turvey Trophy	R3
2016–17	CCFLP	44	21	15	8	70	42	78	5th	PRE	—	FA Vase	R2
2017–18	CCFLP	42	26	6	10	89	52	54	4th	PRE	—	FA Vase	R3
2018–19	CCFLP ↓	38	8	9	21	61	93	33	20th	EPR	—	FA Vase	R1
2019–20	CCFL1	28	16	3	9	79	54	51	3rd (Note: As a result of the COVID-19 pandemic, this season's Combined Counties Football League was formally abandoned on 26 March 2020, with all results from the season being expunged, and no promotion or relegation taking place.)	EPR	—	FA Vase	QR2
2020–21	CCFL1 ↑	12	8	2	2	36	9	26	2nd (Note: As a result of the COVID-19 pandemic, this season's Combined Counties Football League was suspended on 21 December 2020 and then formally abandoned. All results from the season being expunged, but some clubs were promoted or transferred.)	—	—	FA Vase	R4
2021–22	CCFLPs ↑	38	28	7	3	93	29	91	2nd	QR1	—	FA Vase	R2
2022–23	IL1sc ↑	38	28	3	7	102	41	87	2nd (Note: Promoted to Southern League Premier South via the play-offs, beating Northwood 2–1 in the semi-final and Hanworth Villa 3–1 in the final.)	QR3	QR3	Alan Turvey Trophy	R4
2023–24	SLPS	42	18	11	13	78	67	65	7th	QR1	R1	—	—
2024–25	SLPS	42	24	11	7	90	54	83	3rd (Note: Lost in the play-off semi-final to Gloucester City 5–3 in a penalty shoot-out after the match ended 2–2 after extra time.)	QR3	QR3	—	—
2025–26	SLPS ↑	42	29	5	8	94	42	92	1st	QR3	R5	—	—
