= 1958–59 Spartan League =

Spartan League
- Season: 1958–59

The 1958–59 Spartan League season was the 41st in the history of Spartan League. The league consisted of 16 teams.

== League table ==
Spartan League
- Season: 1958–59
- Champions: Briggs Sports
- Promoted: Hertford Town
- Relegated: None

The division featured 16 teams, 14 from last season and 2 new teams:

- Staines Town, from Hellenic League
- Ruislip Manor, from London League

After the season Briggs Sports merged with Ford Sports to form Ford United, and joined Aetolian League.

Pos	Team	Pld	W	D	L	GF	GA	GR	Pts	Promotion or relegation
1	Briggs Sports (C)	30	24	2	4	90	35	2.571	50	Left the league
2	Vauxhall Motors	30	20	2	8	93	42	2.214	42	
3	Histon	30	19	3	8	94	56	1.679	41	
4	Hertford Town (P)	30	17	5	8	72	49	1.469	39	Promotion to Delphian League
5	Huntley & Palmers	30	17	2	11	83	69	1.203	36	
6	Wolverton Town & B.R.	30	16	1	13	72	74	0.973	33	
7	Wood Green Town	30	14	5	11	53	62	0.855	33	
8	Staines Town	30	14	4	12	69	61	1.131	32	
9	Marlow	30	13	5	12	59	64	0.922	31	
10	Rayners Lane	30	12	2	16	61	70	0.871	26	
11	Boreham Wood	30	10	5	15	71	75	0.947	25	
12	Tring Town	30	10	5	15	48	56	0.857	25	
13	Ruislip Manor	30	10	3	17	53	59	0.898	23	
14	Metropolitan Police	30	6	5	19	51	86	0.593	17	
15	Welwyn Garden City	30	6	4	20	45	97	0.464	16	Joined Herts County League
16	Hoddesdon Town	30	5	1	24	35	94	0.372	11	

Rules for classification: 1) points; 2) goal ratio.
(C) Champions; (P) Promoted
