= 1954–55 Spartan League =

Spartan League
- Season: 1954–55

The 1954–55 Spartan League season was the 37th in the history of Spartan League. The league consisted of 16 clubs.

== League table ==
Spartan League
- Season: 1954–55
- Champions: Metropolitan Police
- Promoted: Ware

The division featured 16 clubs, 14 from last season and 2 new clubs:

- Letchworth Town
- Tring Town

Pos	Team	Pld	W	D	L	GF	GA	GR	Pts	Promotion or relegation
1	Metropolitan Police (C)	30	24	4	2	85	37	2.297	52	
2	Briggs Sports	30	22	3	5	108	34	3.176	47	
3	Huntley & Palmers	30	19	4	7	86	55	1.564	42	
4	Vauxhall Motors	30	18	4	8	80	61	1.311	40	
5	Wolverton Town & B.R.	30	16	6	8	90	57	1.579	38	
6	Ford Sports	30	15	7	8	79	59	1.339	37	
7	Histon	30	14	4	12	81	61	1.328	32	
8	Letchworth Town	30	13	6	11	76	60	1.267	32	
9	Harrow Town	30	12	4	14	55	54	1.019	28	
10	Hertford Town	30	9	9	12	60	70	0.857	27	
11	Tring Town	30	9	2	19	41	115	0.357	20	
12	Ware (P)	30	8	3	19	66	74	0.892	19	Promotion to Delphian League
13	Marlow	30	8	3	19	55	95	0.579	19	
14	Hoddesdon Town	30	6	6	18	42	76	0.553	18	
15	Wood Green Town	30	7	3	20	47	88	0.534	17	
16	Bletchley & Wipac	30	2	8	20	34	89	0.382	12	Joined South Midlands League

Source: Non-League Matters
Rules for classification: 1) points; 2) goal ratio.
(C) Champions; (P) Promoted
