= 1951–52 Spartan League =

Spartan League
- Season: 1951–52

The 1951–52 Spartan League season was the 34th in the history of Spartan League. The league consisted of 14 teams.

== League table ==
Spartan League
- Season: 1951–52
- Champions: Briggs Sports
- Promoted: Hemel Hempstead; Upminster

The division featured 14 teams, 8 from last season and 6 new teams:

- Histon Institute
- Hemel Hempstead
- Wood Green Town
- Upminster
- Hoddesdon Town
- Marlow

Pos	Team	Pld	W	D	L	GF	GA	GR	Pts	Promotion
1	Briggs Sports (C)	26	21	4	1	86	17	5.059	46	
2	Wolverton Town & B.R.	26	18	4	4	96	48	2.000	40	
3	Histon Institute	26	15	5	6	67	47	1.426	35	
4	Hertford Town	26	12	4	10	59	56	1.054	28	
5	Hemel Hempstead (P)	26	12	3	11	68	58	1.172	27	Promotion to Delphian League
6	Huntley & Palmers	26	9	8	9	49	56	0.875	26	
7	Harrow Town	26	10	6	10	45	60	0.750	26	
8	Wood Green Town	26	9	6	11	56	65	0.862	24	
9	Upminster (P)	26	9	5	12	53	53	1.000	23	Promotion to Delphian League
10	Metropolitan Police	26	10	2	14	62	64	0.969	22	
11	Letchworth Town	26	8	4	14	48	77	0.623	20	
12	Vauxhall Motors	26	8	2	16	51	71	0.718	18	
13	Hoddesdon Town	26	5	5	16	47	76	0.618	15	
14	Marlow	26	5	4	17	53	92	0.576	14	

Rules for classification: 1) points; 2) goal ratio.
(C) Champions; (P) Promoted
