= List of Delphian League seasons =

The Delphian League was an amateur football league covering Greater London and the surrounding area. It ran for twelve seasons between its formation in 1951 and its merger into the Athenian League in 1963.

== 1951–52 ==
Six clubs joined from the Spartan League Premier Division:

- Aylesbury United
- Berkhamsted Town
- Brentwood & Warley
- Slough Centre
- Willesden
- Yiewsley

Three clubs joined from the Spartan League Division One:

- Bishop's Stortford
- Stevenage Town
- Wembley

Three clubs joined from the London League Premier Division:

- Cheshunt
- Rainham Town
- Woodford Town

Two clubs joined from the Metropolitan League:

- Dagenham
- Leatherhead

Pos	Team	Pld	W	D	L	GF	GA	GD	Pts
1	Brentwood & Warley	26	16	4	6	65	37	+28	36
2	Dagenham	26	16	3	7	68	35	+33	35
3	Yiewsley	26	14	5	7	70	48	+22	33
4	Leatherhead	26	14	4	8	51	43	+8	32
5	Woodford Town	26	12	7	7	59	44	+15	31
6	Aylesbury United	26	12	6	8	67	40	+27	30
7	Rainham Town	26	13	3	10	41	43	−2	29
8	Slough Centre	26	10	6	10	58	61	−3	26
9	Willesden	26	10	3	13	48	50	−2	23
10	Bishop's Stortford	26	10	3	13	55	80	−25	23
11	Berkhamsted Town	26	9	3	14	47	58	−11	21
12	Stevenage Town	26	6	7	13	50	75	−25	19
13	Cheshunt	26	5	6	15	46	69	−23	16
14	Wembley	26	2	6	18	30	72	−42	10

Source: Non-League Matters

== 1952–53 ==
Two new clubs joined the league for the 1952–53 season:

- Hemel Hempstead (from the Spartan League)
- Hornchurch & Upminster (from the Spartan League)

Pos	Team	Pld	W	D	L	GF	GA	GD	Pts	Notes
1	Dagenham	30	22	3	5	78	34	+44	47	
2	Aylesbury United	30	18	3	9	70	43	+27	39	
3	Yiewsley	30	14	11	5	62	48	+14	39	
4	Slough Centre	30	16	4	10	60	35	+25	36	
5	Stevenage Town	30	17	2	11	63	51	+12	36	
6	Brentwood & Warley	30	15	5	10	60	50	+10	35	
7	Woodford Town	30	14	6	10	66	52	+14	34	
8	Rainham Town	30	14	3	13	47	41	+6	31	
9	Leatherhead	30	12	7	11	53	59	−6	31	
10	Hornchurch & Upminster	30	12	5	13	48	48	0	29	
11	Berkhamsted Town	30	11	6	13	57	71	−14	28	
12	Wembley	30	8	7	15	52	58	−6	23	
13	Cheshunt	30	9	4	17	48	66	−18	22	
14	Hemel Hempstead	30	7	3	20	46	77	−31	17	
15	Bishop's Stortford	30	6	5	19	47	94	−47	17	
16	Willesden	30	4	8	18	29	59	−30	16	Joined Parthenon League

Source: Non-League Matters

== 1953–54 ==
Pos	Team	Pld	W	D	L	GF	GA	GD	Pts	Notes
1	Aylesbury United	28	18	5	5	97	45	+52	41	
2	Dagenham	28	18	4	6	64	35	+29	40	
3	Rainham Town	28	17	6	5	64	40	+24	40	
4	Wembley	28	14	4	10	52	49	+3	32	
5	Slough Centre	28	13	5	10	58	52	+6	31	
6	Bishop's Stortford	28	12	4	12	64	56	+8	28	
7	Stevenage Town	28	12	4	12	65	61	+4	28	
8	Woodford Town	28	11	5	12	41	59	−18	27	
9	Yiewsley	28	11	4	13	51	45	+6	26	Promotion to Corinthian League
10	Brentwood & Warley	28	8	9	11	55	62	−7	25	
11	Berkhamsted Town	28	9	7	12	54	61	−7	25	
12	Cheshunt	28	10	5	13	50	59	−9	25	
13	Hemel Hempstead	28	9	5	14	48	66	−18	23	
14	Hornchurch & Upminster	28	6	6	16	46	72	−26	18	
15	Leatherhead	28	4	3	21	45	92	−47	11	

Source: Non-League Matters

== 1954–55 ==
One new club joined the league for the 1954–55 season:

- Tuffnell Park Edmonton (from the Spartan League)

Pos	Team	Pld	W	D	L	GF	GA	GD	Pts	Notes
1	Bishop's Stortford	28	22	3	3	98	39	+59	47	
2	Dagenham	28	19	3	6	82	29	+53	41	
3	Aylesbury United	28	18	1	9	77	43	+34	37	
4	Rainham Town	28	16	4	8	66	47	+19	36	
5	Slough Centre	28	15	5	8	62	46	+16	35	
6	Hemel Hempstead	28	14	1	13	56	53	+3	29	Renamed Hemel Hempstead Town
7	Woodford Town	28	11	6	11	55	58	−3	28	
8	Wembley	28	11	4	13	48	40	+8	26	
9	Stevenage Town	28	10	6	12	53	72	−19	26	
10	Tuffnell Park Edmonton	28	9	6	13	41	61	−20	24	
11	Leatherhead	28	8	5	15	48	65	−17	21	
12	Hornchurch & Upminster	28	9	3	16	49	68	−19	21	
13	Berkhamsted Town	28	9	3	16	42	70	−28	21	
14	Cheshunt	28	6	3	19	37	76	−39	13 (Note: Cheshunt had two points deducted for fielding an ineligible player.)	Joined London League Premier Division
15	Brentwood & Warley	28	4	5	19	36	83	−47	13	

Source: Non-League Matters

== 1955–56 ==
One new club joined the league for the 1955–56 season:

- Ware (from the Spartan League)

Pos	Team	Pld	W	D	L	GF	GA	GD	Pts	Notes
1	Dagenham	28	20	3	5	83	28	+55	43	
2	Wembley	28	18	6	4	72	32	+40	42	Promotion to Corinthian League
3	Rainham Town	28	18	3	7	71	45	+26	39	
4	Bishop's Stortford	28	16	5	7	84	43	+41	37	
5	Aylesbury United	28	14	4	10	57	63	−6	32	
6	Hornchurch & Upminster	28	13	5	10	60	59	+1	31	
7	Hemel Hempstead Town	28	11	8	9	61	56	+5	30	
8	Leatherhead	28	11	5	12	53	63	−10	27	
9	Tuffnell Park Edmonton	28	9	7	12	51	59	−8	25	
10	Ware	28	8	9	11	63	73	−10	25	
11	Berkhamsted Town	28	10	3	15	53	72	−19	23	
12	Woodford Town	28	8	7	13	52	74	−22	23	
13	Slough Centre	28	6	6	16	50	68	−18	18	Left the league
14	Brentwood & Warley	28	5	3	20	42	80	−38	13	
15	Stevenage Town	28	2	8	18	35	72	−37	12	Renamed Stevenage

Source: Non-League Matters

== 1956–57 ==
One new club joined the league for the 1956–57 season:

- Letchworth Town (from the Spartan League)

Pos	Team	Pld	W	D	L	GF	GA	GD	Pts	Notes
1	Dagenham	26	18	5	3	66	29	+37	41	Promotion to Corinthian League
2	Rainham Town	26	15	4	7	68	45	+23	34	
3	Brentwood & Warley	26	14	6	6	68	46	+22	34	
4	Aylesbury United	26	11	7	8	55	41	+14	29	
5	Bishop's Stortford	26	13	3	10	70	56	+14	29	
6	Ware	26	13	2	11	78	65	+13	28	
7	Letchworth Town	26	12	3	11	57	47	+10	27	
8	Hornchurch & Upminster	26	12	3	11	47	44	+3	27	
9	Leatherhead	26	11	4	11	57	67	−10	26	
10	Hemel Hempstead Town	26	8	6	12	50	56	−6	22	
11	Stevenage	26	6	7	13	39	70	−31	19	
12	Tuffnell Park Edmonton	26	5	8	13	40	59	−19	18	
13	Berkhamsted Town	26	6	5	15	35	64	−29	17	
14	Woodford Town	26	5	3	18	43	84	−41	13	

Source: Non-League Matters

== 1957–58 ==
Two new clubs joined the league for the 1957–58 season:

- Aveley (from the London League)
- Wokingham Town (from the Metropolitan League)

Pos	Team	Pld	W	D	L	GF	GA	GD	Pts	Notes
1	Letchworth Town	28	22	4	2	96	27	+69	48	
2	Aveley	28	18	4	6	77	46	+31	40	
3	Rainham Town	28	17	5	6	67	45	+22	39	
4	Brentwood & Warley	28	15	5	8	78	47	+31	35	
5	Aylesbury United	28	14	6	8	69	49	+20	34	
6	Leatherhead	28	14	4	10	77	56	+21	32	Promotion to Corinthian League
7	Hornchurch & Upminster	28	13	5	10	50	38	+12	31	
8	Bishop's Stortford	28	12	6	10	62	54	+8	30	
9	Tuffnell Park Edmonton	28	11	6	11	44	53	−9	28	
10	Woodford Town	28	8	6	14	44	66	−22	22	
11	Ware	28	8	5	15	41	60	−19	21	
12	Wokingham Town	28	8	5	15	44	69	−25	21	
13	Hemel Hempstead Town	28	6	5	17	30	72	−42	17	
14	Stevenage	28	5	3	20	40	79	−39	13	
15	Berkhamsted Town	28	4	1	23	24	82	−58	9	

Source: Non-League Matters

== 1958–59 ==
One new club joined the league for the 1958–59 season:

- Harrow Town (from the Spartan League)

Pos	Team	Pld	W	D	L	GF	GA	GD	Pts	Notes
1	Brentwood & Warley	28	21	1	6	74	39	+35	43	
2	Hornchurch & Upminster	28	19	2	7	73	41	+32	40	Promotion to Athenian League
3	Woodford Town	28	15	6	7	60	39	+21	36	
4	Harrow Town	28	14	7	7	73	40	+33	35	
5	Bishop's Stortford	28	15	5	8	64	50	+14	35	
6	Rainham Town	28	14	5	9	64	41	+23	33	
7	Aylesbury United	28	16	1	11	57	48	+9	33	
8	Aveley	28	13	5	10	58	52	+6	31	
9	Ware	28	10	7	11	52	52	0	27	
10	Wokingham Town	28	11	2	15	63	54	+9	24	Promotion to Corinthian League
11	Tuffnell Park Edmonton	28	9	5	14	55	50	+5	23	
12	Letchworth Town	28	7	8	13	52	70	−18	22	Promotion to Corinthian League
13	Hemel Hempstead Town	28	6	5	17	44	77	−33	17	
14	Stevenage	28	5	4	19	39	94	−55	14	
15	Berkhamsted Town	28	3	1	24	30	111	−81	7	

Source: Non-League Matters

== 1959–60 ==
One new club joined the league for the 1959–60 season:

- Hertford Town (from the Spartan League)

Pos	Team	Pld	W	D	L	GF	GA	GD	Pts	Notes
1	Brentwood & Warley	24	17	3	4	56	23	+33	37	
2	Hertford Town	24	17	1	6	55	22	+33	35	
3	Harrow Town	24	13	7	4	52	32	+20	33	
4	Bishop's Stortford	24	14	3	7	52	35	+17	31	
5	Aylesbury United	24	13	4	7	50	37	+13	30	
6	Woodford Town	24	12	3	9	39	29	+10	27	
7	Rainham Town	24	10	7	7	45	35	+10	27	
8	Aveley	24	8	7	9	41	42	−1	23	
9	Ware	24	8	4	12	38	54	−16	20	
10	Stevenage	24	6	5	13	34	50	−16	17	Renamed Stevenage Town
11	Tuffnell Park Edmonton	24	6	4	14	36	53	−17	16	Renamed Edmonton
12	Hemel Hempstead Town	24	3	3	18	23	63	−40	9	
13	Berkhamsted Town	24	2	3	19	22	68	−46	7	

Source: Non-League Matters

== 1960–61 ==
Two new clubs joined the league for the 1960–61 season:

- Histon (from the Spartan League)
- Windsor & Eton (from the Metropolitan League)

Pos	Team	Pld	W	D	L	GF	GA	GD	Pts	Notes
1	Hertford Town	28	20	5	3	65	27	+38	45	
2	Brentwood & Warley	28	21	1	6	86	32	+54	43	
3	Windsor & Eton	28	17	4	7	64	43	+21	38	
4	Hemel Hempstead Town	28	14	5	9	59	44	+15	33	
5	Bishop's Stortford	28	14	2	12	67	63	+4	30	
6	Harrow Town	28	12	6	10	65	63	+2	30	
7	Aveley	28	13	3	12	69	55	+14	29	
8	Rainham Town	28	11	4	13	53	46	+7	26	Joined Metropolitan League
9	Aylesbury United	28	10	4	14	57	64	−7	24	
10	Histon	28	10	4	14	58	71	−13	24	
11	Ware	28	8	6	14	55	74	−19	22	
12	Edmonton	28	8	5	15	47	64	−17	21	
13	Stevenage Town	28	7	7	14	44	61	−17	21	
14	Woodford Town	28	8	5	15	38	68	−30	21	Joined Metropolitan League
15	Berkhamsted Town	28	3	7	18	35	87	−52	13	

Source: Non-League Matters

== 1961–62 ==
One new club joined the league for the 1961–62 season:

- Harlow Town (from the London League)

Pos	Team	Pld	W	D	L	GF	GA	GD	Pts
1	Hertford Town	26	18	5	3	84	32	+52	41
2	Hemel Hempstead Town	26	14	9	3	64	29	+35	37
3	Bishop's Stortford	26	14	6	6	62	36	+26	34
4	Brentwood & Warley	26	12	8	6	63	55	+8	32
5	Aylesbury United	26	11	8	7	46	40	+6	30
6	Windsor & Eton	26	10	7	9	66	53	+13	27
7	Aveley	26	9	8	9	50	43	+7	26
8	Edmonton	26	8	9	9	45	43	+2	25
9	Stevenage Town	26	9	7	10	53	65	−12	25
10	Berkhamsted Town	26	9	4	13	34	58	−24	22
11	Ware	26	7	7	12	36	58	−22	21
12	Harlow Town	26	5	8	13	28	39	−11	18
13	Harrow Town	26	3	7	16	33	62	−29	13
14	Histon	26	5	3	18	39	90	−51	13

Source: Non-League Matters

== 1962–63 ==
Two new clubs joined the league for the 1962–63 season:

- Tilbury (from the London League)
- Wingate (from the London League)

Due to the severe weather during the winter, the league was abandoned, with clubs having played between 11 and 18 matches. The league was split into East and West sections, with the clubs playing each other once. The two winners of the sections played a two-leg play-off for the championship.

Pos	Team	Pld	W	D	L	GF	GA	GD	Pts
1	Hertford Town	17	13	3	1	61	19	+42	29
2	Bishop's Stortford	17	9	5	3	38	29	+9	23
3	Aveley	17	8	5	4	34	29	+5	21
4	Stevenage Town	15	7	4	4	21	24	−3	18
5	Tilbury	16	6	5	5	32	29	+3	17
6	Windsor & Eton	17	6	5	6	37	35	+2	17
7	Edmonton	14	7	2	5	40	20	+20	16
8	Harlow Town	11	7	1	3	25	7	+18	15
9	Aylesbury United	14	5	5	4	32	29	+3	15
10	Hemel Hempstead Town	12	5	3	4	31	18	+13	13
11	Berkhamsted Town	16	6	1	9	27	25	+2	13
12	Ware	15	5	2	8	28	33	−5	12
13	Brentwood & Warley	17	5	1	11	27	49	−22	11
14	Harrow Town	12	3	3	6	23	32	−9	9
15	Histon	18	4	1	13	21	67	−46	9
16	Wingate	16	1	4	11	21	53	−32	6

Source: Non-League Matters

=== East Division ===
Pos	Team	Pld	W	D	L	GF	GA	GD	Pts	Notes
1	Hertford Town	7	5	1	1	15	4	+11	11	Joined Athenian League Division Two
2	Bishop's Stortford	7	5	1	1	13	8	+5	11	Joined Athenian League Division Two
3	Harlow Town	7	4	1	2	14	10	+4	9	Joined Athenian League Division Two
4	Aveley	7	4	0	3	11	11	0	8	Joined Athenian League Division Two
5	Tilbury	7	2	2	3	13	13	0	6	Joined Athenian League Division Two
6	Ware	7	1	3	3	13	17	−4	5	Joined Athenian League Division Two
7	Histon	7	1	2	4	7	14	−7	4	Joined Athenian League Division Two
8	Brentwood & Warley	7	0	2	5	7	16	−9	2	Joined Athenian League Division Two

Source: Non-League Matters

=== West Division ===
Pos	Team	Pld	W	D	L	GF	GA	GD	Pts	Notes
1	Edmonton	7	5	1	1	25	6	+19	11	Joined Athenian League Division Two
2	Windsor & Eton	7	4	2	1	14	10	+4	10	Joined Athenian League Division Two
3	Berkhamsted Town	7	3	3	1	16	12	+4	9	Joined Athenian League Division Two
4	Hemel Hempstead Town	7	3	2	2	13	9	+4	8	Joined Athenian League Division Two
5	Harrow Town	7	4	0	3	11	10	+1	8	Joined Athenian League Division Two
6	Aylesbury United	7	2	0	5	12	21	−9	4	Joined Athenian League Division Two
7	Wingate	7	2	0	5	9	17	−8	4	Joined Athenian League Division Two
8	Stevenage Town	7	0	2	5	8	23	−15	2	Promotion to Southern League Division One

Source: Non-League Matters

=== Play-off ===
Hertford Town	1–1	Edmonton

Edmonton	1–1 (4–1 aet)	Hertford Town
