= 1963–64 Athenian League =

Athenian League
- Season: 1963–64

The 1963–64 Athenian League season was the 41st in the history of Athenian League. The league consisted of 43 teams.

== Premier Division ==
Athenian League Premier Division
- Season: 1963–64
- Champions: Barnet
- Promoted: Wealdstone
- Relegated: None

The division featured 14 teams:

- 12 came from last seasons Athenian League
- 2 came from last seasons Corinthian League:
  - Dagenham (4.)
  - Maidenhead United (7.)

=== League table ===
Pos	Team	Pld	W	D	L	GF	GA	GR	Pts	Promotion
1	Barnet (C)	26	17	4	5	82	34	2.412	38	
2	Finchley	26	14	6	6	61	39	1.564	34	
3	Carshalton Athletic	26	15	4	7	42	28	1.500	34	
4	Hayes	26	9	12	5	50	39	1.282	30	
5	Wealdstone (P)	26	12	5	9	54	47	1.149	29	Promotion to Isthmian League
6	Dagenham	26	12	4	10	57	42	1.357	28	
7	Walton & Hersham	26	13	2	11	52	54	0.963	28	
8	Redhill	26	9	9	8	39	40	0.975	27	
9	Maidenhead United	26	12	2	12	54	48	1.125	26	
10	Hornchurch	26	7	8	11	35	49	0.714	22	
11	Grays Athletic	26	9	4	13	27	43	0.628	22	
12	Leyton	26	4	9	13	33	62	0.532	17	
13	Hounslow Town	26	7	1	18	38	76	0.500	15	
14	Southall	26	5	4	17	36	59	0.610	14	

Source: rsssf.com
Rules for classification: 1) points; 2) goal ratio.
(C) Champions; (P) Promoted

=== Stadia and locations ===
Locations of the Athenian League Premier Division clubs
Greater London Athenian League Premier Division football clubs

Club	Stadium
Barnet	Underhill Stadium
Carshalton Athletic	War Memorial Sports Ground
Dagenham	Victoria Road
Finchley	Summers Lane
Grays Athletic	New Recreation Ground
Hayes	Church Road
Hornchurch	Hornchurch Stadium
Hounslow	Denbigh Road
Leyton	Leyton Stadium
Maidenhead United	York Road
Redhill	Kiln Brow
Southall	Robert Parker Stadium
Walton & Hersham	The Sports Ground
Wealdstone	Grosvenor Vale

== Division One ==
Athenian League Division One
- Season: 1963–64
- Champions: Leatherhead
- Promoted: Leatherhead; Worthing; Edgware Town
- Relegated: None

The division featured 14 teams, all teams came from last seasons Corinthian League

=== League table ===
Pos	Team	Pld	W	D	L	GF	GA	GR	Pts	Promotion
1	Leatherhead (C, P)	26	18	3	5	86	45	1.911	39	Promotion to Premier Division
2	Worthing (P)	26	18	2	6	76	40	1.900	38	Promotion to Premier Division
3	Edgware Town (P)	26	17	4	5	72	40	1.800	38	Promotion to Premier Division
4	Erith & Belvedere	26	12	8	6	46	30	1.533	32	
5	Slough Town	26	15	2	9	54	37	1.459	32	
6	Letchworth Town	26	12	6	8	80	52	1.538	30	
7	Chesham United	26	14	2	10	75	57	1.316	30	
8	Uxbridge	26	11	5	10	45	42	1.071	27	
9	Wokingham Town	26	11	3	12	42	54	0.778	25	
10	Wembley	26	8	4	14	48	67	0.716	20	
11	Eastbourne	26	7	3	16	44	75	0.587	17	
12	Dorking	26	7	2	17	44	74	0.595	16	
13	Horsham	26	4	3	19	27	67	0.403	11	
14	Epsom & Ewell	26	4	1	21	45	104	0.433	9	

Source: rsssf.com
Rules for classification: 1) points; 2) goal ratio.
(C) Champions; (P) Promoted

=== Stadia and locations ===
Locations of the Athenian League Division One clubs
Greater London Athenian League Division One football clubs

Club	Stadium
Chesham United	The Meadow
Dorking	Meadowbank Stadium
Eastbourne	The Saffrons
Edgware Town	White Lion
Epsom & Ewell	Merland Rise
Erith & Belvedere	Park View
Horsham	Queen Street
Leatherhead	Fetcham Grove
Letchworth Town	Baldock Road
Slough Town	Wexham Park
Uxbridge	Honeycroft
Wembley	Vale Farm
Wokingham Town	Cantley Park
Worthing	Woodside Road

== Division Two ==
Athenian League Division Two
- Season: 1963–64
- Champions: Tilbury
- Promoted: Tilbury; Harrow Town; Harlow Town; Hertford Town; Hemel Hempstead Town
- Relegated: None

The division featured 15 teams, all teams came from last seasons Delphian League

=== League table ===
Pos	Team	Pld	W	D	L	GF	GA	GR	Pts	Promotion
1	Tilbury (C, P)	28	18	6	4	90	44	2.045	42	Promotion to Division One
2	Harrow Town (P)	28	20	2	6	85	42	2.024	42	Promotion to Division One
3	Harlow Town (P)	28	17	6	5	74	34	2.176	40	Promotion to Division One
4	Hertford Town (P)	28	15	7	6	72	42	1.714	37	Promotion to Division One
5	Hemel Hempstead Town (P)	28	15	4	9	63	43	1.465	34	Promotion to Division One
6	Aveley	28	14	5	9	70	40	1.750	33	
7	Bishop's Stortford	28	14	3	11	67	40	1.675	31	
8	Windsor & Eton	28	12	4	12	61	61	1.000	28	
9	Ware	28	11	5	12	62	59	1.051	27	
10	Brentwood & Warley	28	10	5	13	49	59	0.831	25	
11	Berkhamsted Town	28	9	6	13	52	67	0.776	24	
12	Edmonton	28	7	6	15	53	65	0.815	20	
13	Aylesbury United	28	8	1	19	45	87	0.517	17	
14	Wingate	28	5	5	18	36	79	0.456	15	
15	Histon	28	2	1	25	25	142	0.176	5	

Source: rsssf.com
Rules for classification: 1) points; 2) goal ratio.
(C) Champions; (P) Promoted

=== Stadia and locations ===
Locations of the Athenian League Division Two clubs
Greater London Athenian League Division Two football clubs

Club	Stadium
Aveley	The Mill Field
Aylesbury United	Buckingham Road
Berkhamsted Town	Broadwater
Bishop's Stortford	Woodside Park
Brentwood & Warley	The Brentwood Centre Arena
Edmonton	Coles Park
Harlow Town	Harlow Sportcentre
Harrow Town	Earlsmead Stadium
Hemel Hempstead	Vauxhall Road
Hertford Town	Hertingfordbury Park
Histon	Bridge Road
Tilbury	Chadfields
Ware	Wodson Park
Windsor & Eton	Stag Meadow
Wingate	Hall Lane
