= 1959–60 Spartan League =

Spartan League
- Season: 1959–60

The 1959–60 Spartan League season was the 42nd in the history of Spartan League. The league consisted of 15 teams.

== League table ==
Spartan League
- Season: 1959–60
- Champions: Staines Town
- Promoted: Histon
- Relegated: None

The division featured 15 teams, 13 from last season and 2 new teams:

- Molesey, from Surrey Senior League
- Bletchley Town, from Hellenic League

Pos	Team	Pld	W	D	L	GF	GA	GR	Pts	Promotion or relegation
1	Staines Town (C)	28	18	4	6	60	36	1.667	40	
2	Molesey	28	17	4	7	80	41	1.951	38	
3	Vauxhall Motors	28	17	2	9	70	36	1.944	36	
4	Histon (P)	28	16	4	8	68	43	1.581	36	Promotion to Delphian League
5	Wolverton Town	28	17	1	10	81	49	1.653	35	
6	Boreham Wood	28	15	4	9	70	61	1.148	34	
7	Wood Green Town	28	12	8	8	68	47	1.447	32	
8	Metropolitan Police	28	13	6	9	66	57	1.158	32	Joined Metropolitan League
9	Ruislip Manor	28	8	5	15	49	62	0.790	21	
10	Rayners Lane	28	8	5	15	45	63	0.714	21	
11	Tring Town	28	9	3	16	41	68	0.603	21	
12	Huntley & Palmers	28	7	7	14	40	67	0.597	21	
13	Marlow	28	7	6	15	51	65	0.785	20	
14	Bletchley Town	28	6	5	17	38	90	0.422	17	Joined United Counties League
15	Hoddesdon Town	28	6	4	18	37	79	0.468	16	

Rules for classification: 1) points; 2) goal ratio.
(C) Champions; (P) Promoted
