= List of Corinthian League (football) seasons =

The Corinthian League ran for eighteen seasons between its formation in 1945 and its merger into the Athenian League in 1963.

== 1945–46 ==
The league was composed of:

- Epsom Town (from the London League Premier Division)
- Erith & Belvedere (from the Kent League Division One)
- Grays Athletic (from the London League Premier Division)
- London Fire Forces
- Maidenhead United (from the Great Western Combination)
- Slough United (from the Great Western Combination)
- Twickenham
- Walton & Hersham
- Windsor & Eton (from the Great Western Combination)

| Pos | Team | Pld | W | D | L | GF | GA | GD | Pts | Result |
|---|---|---|---|---|---|---|---|---|---|---|
| 1 | Grays Athletic | 16 | 14 | 2 | 0 | 59 | 14 | +45 | 30 | |
| 2 | Slough United | 16 | 13 | 1 | 2 | 54 | 24 | +30 | 27 | |
| 3 | Erith & Belvedere | 16 | 9 | 2 | 5 | 50 | 28 | +22 | 20 | |
| 4 | Windsor & Eton | 16 | 8 | 1 | 7 | 56 | 49 | +7 | 17 | |
| 5 | Maidenhead United | 16 | 7 | 0 | 9 | 43 | 44 | −1 | 14 | |
| 6 | Epsom Town | 16 | 6 | 1 | 9 | 28 | 37 | −9 | 13 | Joined London League Premier Division |
| 7 | Walton & Hersham | 16 | 5 | 2 | 9 | 31 | 53 | −22 | 12 | |
| 8 | Twickenham | 16 | 4 | 1 | 11 | 31 | 67 | −36 | 9 | Left the league |
| 9 | London Fire Forces | 16 | 1 | 0 | 15 | 16 | 52 | −36 | 2 | Left the league |

Source: Non-League Matters

== 1946–47 ==
Seven new clubs joined the league for the 1946–47 season:

- Bedford Avenue (from the United Counties League)
- Carshalton Athletic (from the London League Western Division)
- Eastbourne (from the Southern Amateur League)
- Edgware Town (from the London League Western Division)
- Hastings & St Leonards (from the Southern Amateur League)
- Hounslow Town (from the Spartan League Western Division)
- Uxbridge (from the London League Western Division)

| Pos | Team | Pld | W | D | L | GF | GA | GD | Pts | Result |
|---|---|---|---|---|---|---|---|---|---|---|
| 1 | Walton & Hersham | 24 | 19 | 2 | 3 | 88 | 35 | +53 | 40 | |
| 2 | Slough United | 24 | 15 | 4 | 5 | 92 | 49 | +43 | 34 | Changed name to Slough Town |
| 3 | Windsor & Eton | 24 | 14 | 4 | 6 | 83 | 49 | +34 | 32 | |
| 4 | Uxbridge | 24 | 13 | 4 | 7 | 92 | 53 | +39 | 30 | |
| 5 | Grays Athletic | 24 | 12 | 5 | 7 | 70 | 59 | +11 | 29 | |
| 6 | Erith & Belvedere | 24 | 12 | 2 | 10 | 68 | 51 | +17 | 26 | |
| 7 | Hounslow Town | 24 | 9 | 4 | 11 | 57 | 55 | +2 | 22 | |
| 8 | Maidenhead United | 24 | 8 | 5 | 11 | 50 | 67 | −17 | 21 | |
| 9 | Hastings & St Leonards | 24 | 6 | 7 | 11 | 42 | 68 | −26 | 19 | |
| 10 | Eastbourne | 24 | 8 | 2 | 14 | 57 | 80 | −23 | 18 | |
| 11 | Carshalton Athletic | 24 | 6 | 6 | 12 | 59 | 91 | −32 | 18 | |
| 12 | Edgware Town | 24 | 6 | 2 | 16 | 40 | 76 | −36 | 14 | |
| 13 | Bedford Avenue | 24 | 4 | 1 | 19 | 51 | 116 | −65 | 9 | |

Source: Non-League Matters

== 1947–48 ==
One new club joined the league for the 1947–48 season:

- Chesham United (from the Spartan League)

| Pos | Team | Pld | W | D | L | GF | GA | GD | Pts | Result |
|---|---|---|---|---|---|---|---|---|---|---|
| 1 | Walton & Hersham | 26 | 17 | 4 | 5 | 82 | 40 | +42 | 38 | |
| 2 | Hounslow Town | 26 | 16 | 2 | 8 | 68 | 46 | +22 | 34 | |
| 3 | Erith & Belvedere | 26 | 15 | 3 | 8 | 67 | 38 | +29 | 33 | |
| 4 | Carshalton Athletic | 26 | 15 | 2 | 9 | 70 | 53 | +17 | 32 | |
| 5 | Grays Athletic | 26 | 13 | 5 | 8 | 68 | 56 | +12 | 31 | |
| 6 | Edgware Town | 26 | 12 | 5 | 9 | 55 | 46 | +9 | 29 | |
| 7 | Hastings & St Leonards | 26 | 12 | 3 | 11 | 72 | 57 | +15 | 27 | |
| 8 | Maidenhead United | 26 | 10 | 5 | 11 | 45 | 52 | −7 | 25 | |
| 9 | Eastbourne | 26 | 10 | 4 | 12 | 55 | 68 | −13 | 24 | |
| 10 | Uxbridge | 26 | 10 | 3 | 13 | 53 | 62 | −9 | 23 | |
| 11 | Chesham United | 26 | 6 | 9 | 11 | 48 | 60 | −12 | 21 | |
| 12 | Windsor & Eton | 26 | 9 | 3 | 14 | 42 | 75 | −33 | 21 | |
| 13 | Slough Town | 26 | 7 | 4 | 15 | 50 | 51 | −1 | 18 | |
| 14 | Bedford Avenue | 26 | 4 | 0 | 22 | 35 | 106 | −71 | 8 | Left the league |

Source: Non-League Matters

== 1948–49 ==
One new club joined the league for the 1948–49 season:

- Worthing (from the Sussex County League)

Hastings & St Leonards resigned after a single match (a 6–0 defeat at Hounslow Town) due to difficulties with their ground. Their record was expunged.

| Pos | Team | Pld | W | D | L | GF | GA | GD | Pts | Result |
|---|---|---|---|---|---|---|---|---|---|---|
| 1 | Walton & Hersham | 24 | 19 | 1 | 4 | 82 | 32 | +50 | 39 | |
| 2 | Uxbridge | 24 | 14 | 5 | 5 | 52 | 36 | +16 | 33 | |
| 3 | Hounslow Town | 24 | 13 | 6 | 5 | 67 | 45 | +22 | 32 | |
| 4 | Erith & Belvedere | 24 | 13 | 5 | 6 | 54 | 39 | +15 | 31 | |
| 5 | Grays Athletic | 24 | 12 | 4 | 8 | 73 | 58 | +15 | 28 | |
| 6 | Slough Town | 24 | 10 | 6 | 8 | 55 | 38 | +17 | 26 | |
| 7 | Worthing | 24 | 7 | 7 | 10 | 49 | 60 | −11 | 21 | |
| 8 | Chesham United | 24 | 8 | 5 | 11 | 42 | 75 | −33 | 21 | |
| 9 | Maidenhead United | 24 | 8 | 4 | 12 | 34 | 48 | −14 | 20 | |
| 10 | Carshalton Athletic | 24 | 7 | 3 | 14 | 48 | 59 | −11 | 17 | |
| 11 | Edgware Town | 24 | 4 | 8 | 12 | 35 | 43 | −8 | 16 | |
| 12 | Eastbourne | 24 | 6 | 4 | 14 | 49 | 68 | −19 | 16 | |
| 13 | Windsor & Eton | 24 | 6 | 0 | 18 | 35 | 74 | −39 | 12 | |
| – | Hastings & St Leonards | 0 | – | – | – | – | – | — | 0 | Resigned after one match, record expunged |

Source: Non-League Matters

== 1949–50 ==
One new club joined the league for the 1949–50 season:

- Epsom (from the London League Premier Division)

| Pos | Team | Pld | W | D | L | GF | GA | GD | Pts | Result |
|---|---|---|---|---|---|---|---|---|---|---|
| 1 | Hounslow Town | 26 | 19 | 3 | 4 | 86 | 37 | +49 | 41 | |
| 2 | Walton & Hersham | 26 | 18 | 4 | 4 | 69 | 31 | +38 | 40 | Promotion to Athenian League |
| 3 | Erith & Belvedere | 26 | 14 | 6 | 6 | 59 | 30 | +29 | 34 | |
| 4 | Uxbridge | 26 | 15 | 3 | 8 | 65 | 47 | +18 | 33 | |
| 5 | Worthing | 26 | 12 | 4 | 10 | 57 | 50 | +7 | 28 | |
| 6 | Grays Athletic | 26 | 10 | 8 | 8 | 63 | 62 | +1 | 28 | |
| 7 | Eastbourne | 26 | 10 | 7 | 9 | 52 | 46 | +6 | 27 | |
| 8 | Slough Town | 26 | 10 | 7 | 9 | 46 | 51 | −5 | 27 | |
| 9 | Edgware Town | 26 | 10 | 5 | 11 | 50 | 53 | −3 | 25 | |
| 10 | Maidenhead United | 26 | 7 | 8 | 11 | 43 | 46 | −3 | 22 | |
| 11 | Chesham United | 26 | 7 | 8 | 11 | 53 | 59 | −6 | 22 | |
| 12 | Carshalton Athletic | 26 | 8 | 4 | 14 | 56 | 75 | −19 | 20 | |
| 13 | Epsom | 26 | 2 | 5 | 19 | 38 | 95 | −57 | 9 | |
| 14 | Windsor & Eton | 26 | 3 | 2 | 21 | 34 | 89 | −55 | 8 | Joined Metropolitan League |

Source: Non-League Matters

== 1950–51 ==
Two new clubs joined the league for the 1950–51 season:

- Maidstone United (from the Kent League Division One)
- Tilbury (from the London League Premier Division)

| Pos | Team | Pld | W | D | L | GF | GA | GD | Pts |
|---|---|---|---|---|---|---|---|---|---|
| 1 | Slough Town | 26 | 17 | 4 | 5 | 65 | 33 | +32 | 38 |
| 2 | Hounslow Town | 26 | 17 | 3 | 6 | 80 | 41 | +39 | 37 |
| 3 | Erith & Belvedere | 26 | 13 | 5 | 8 | 59 | 43 | +16 | 31 |
| 4 | Edgware Town | 26 | 14 | 2 | 10 | 65 | 52 | +13 | 30 |
| 5 | Maidenhead United | 26 | 13 | 3 | 10 | 57 | 49 | +8 | 29 |
| 6 | Grays Athletic | 26 | 11 | 5 | 10 | 68 | 54 | +14 | 27 |
| 7 | Chesham United | 26 | 11 | 4 | 11 | 69 | 61 | +8 | 26 |
| 8 | Tilbury | 26 | 11 | 4 | 11 | 42 | 44 | −2 | 26 |
| 9 | Uxbridge | 26 | 10 | 4 | 12 | 64 | 62 | +2 | 24 |
| 10 | Worthing | 26 | 11 | 2 | 13 | 52 | 75 | −23 | 24 |
| 11 | Carshalton Athletic | 26 | 8 | 4 | 14 | 65 | 75 | −10 | 20 |
| 12 | Eastbourne | 26 | 8 | 3 | 15 | 47 | 65 | −18 | 19 |
| 13 | Epsom | 26 | 8 | 2 | 16 | 61 | 94 | −33 | 18 |
| 14 | Maidstone United | 26 | 6 | 3 | 17 | 58 | 104 | −46 | 15 |

Source: Non-League Matters

== 1951–52 ==
| Pos | Team | Pld | W | D | L | GF | GA | GD | Pts |
|---|---|---|---|---|---|---|---|---|---|
| 1 | Hounslow Town | 26 | 21 | 1 | 4 | 85 | 28 | +57 | 43 |
| 2 | Grays Athletic | 26 | 19 | 5 | 2 | 77 | 35 | +42 | 43 |
| 3 | Slough Town | 26 | 19 | 3 | 4 | 85 | 37 | +48 | 41 |
| 4 | Erith & Belvedere | 26 | 14 | 1 | 11 | 56 | 50 | +6 | 29 |
| 5 | Carshalton Athletic | 26 | 10 | 7 | 9 | 67 | 59 | +8 | 27 |
| 6 | Chesham United | 26 | 12 | 2 | 12 | 64 | 62 | +2 | 26 |
| 7 | Tilbury | 26 | 11 | 4 | 11 | 46 | 58 | −12 | 26 |
| 8 | Eastbourne | 26 | 9 | 7 | 10 | 53 | 53 | 0 | 25 |
| 9 | Epsom | 26 | 9 | 4 | 13 | 45 | 65 | −20 | 22 |
| 10 | Worthing | 26 | 8 | 6 | 12 | 44 | 68 | −24 | 22 |
| 11 | Uxbridge | 26 | 8 | 5 | 13 | 59 | 58 | +1 | 21 |
| 12 | Edgware Town | 26 | 5 | 5 | 16 | 37 | 61 | −24 | 15 |
| 13 | Maidstone United | 26 | 3 | 7 | 16 | 40 | 80 | −40 | 13 |
| 14 | Maidenhead United | 26 | 5 | 1 | 20 | 28 | 72 | −44 | 11 |

Source: Non-League Matters

== 1952–53 ==
| Pos | Team | Pld | W | D | L | GF | GA | GD | Pts |
|---|---|---|---|---|---|---|---|---|---|
| 1 | Carshalton Athletic | 26 | 19 | 1 | 6 | 70 | 44 | +26 | 39 |
| 2 | Hounslow Town | 26 | 16 | 4 | 6 | 84 | 46 | +38 | 36 |
| 3 | Epsom | 26 | 16 | 2 | 8 | 72 | 39 | +33 | 34 |
| 4 | Maidstone United | 26 | 14 | 4 | 8 | 58 | 53 | +5 | 32 |
| 5 | Uxbridge | 26 | 12 | 5 | 9 | 40 | 41 | −1 | 29 |
| 6 | Grays Athletic | 26 | 11 | 6 | 9 | 58 | 47 | +11 | 28 |
| 7 | Edgware Town | 26 | 11 | 6 | 9 | 65 | 54 | +11 | 28 |
| 8 | Tilbury | 26 | 10 | 5 | 11 | 46 | 42 | +4 | 25 |
| 9 | Maidenhead United | 26 | 9 | 5 | 12 | 44 | 50 | −6 | 23 |
| 10 | Slough Town | 26 | 7 | 7 | 12 | 39 | 53 | −14 | 21 |
| 11 | Eastbourne | 26 | 7 | 7 | 12 | 40 | 58 | −18 | 21 |
| 12 | Erith & Belvedere | 26 | 8 | 4 | 14 | 43 | 50 | −7 | 20 |
| 13 | Chesham United | 26 | 5 | 4 | 17 | 33 | 64 | −31 | 14 |
| 14 | Worthing | 26 | 6 | 2 | 18 | 30 | 81 | −51 | 14 |

Source: Non-League Matters

== 1953–54 ==
| Pos | Team | Pld | W | D | L | GF | GA | GD | Pts |
|---|---|---|---|---|---|---|---|---|---|
| 1 | Carshalton Athletic | 26 | 17 | 5 | 4 | 75 | 41 | +34 | 39 |
| 2 | Edgware Town | 26 | 17 | 4 | 5 | 74 | 40 | +34 | 38 |
| 3 | Hounslow Town | 26 | 13 | 8 | 5 | 75 | 45 | +30 | 34 |
| 4 | Maidstone United | 26 | 13 | 7 | 6 | 60 | 43 | +17 | 33 |
| 5 | Grays Athletic | 26 | 12 | 2 | 12 | 62 | 50 | +12 | 26 |
| 6 | Tilbury | 26 | 10 | 6 | 10 | 59 | 55 | +4 | 26 |
| 7 | Erith & Belvedere | 26 | 10 | 6 | 10 | 45 | 55 | −10 | 26 |
| 8 | Eastbourne | 26 | 11 | 5 | 10 | 47 | 45 | +2 | 25 (Note: Eastbourne had two points deducted.) |
| 9 | Uxbridge | 26 | 11 | 3 | 12 | 45 | 56 | −11 | 25 |
| 10 | Epsom | 26 | 11 | 1 | 14 | 54 | 64 | −10 | 23 |
| 11 | Worthing | 26 | 7 | 6 | 13 | 52 | 66 | −14 | 20 |
| 12 | Maidenhead United | 26 | 7 | 4 | 15 | 47 | 72 | −25 | 18 |
| 13 | Slough Town | 26 | 5 | 7 | 14 | 49 | 60 | −11 | 17 |
| 14 | Chesham United | 26 | 4 | 4 | 18 | 39 | 91 | −52 | 12 |

Source: Non-League Matters

== 1954–55 ==
One new club joined the league for the 1954–55 season:

- Yiewsley (from the Delphian League)

| Pos | Team | Pld | W | D | L | GF | GA | GD | Pts | Result |
|---|---|---|---|---|---|---|---|---|---|---|
| 1 | Hounslow Town | 28 | 22 | 3 | 3 | 80 | 37 | +43 | 47 | Promotion to Athenian League |
| 2 | Grays Athletic | 28 | 18 | 3 | 7 | 74 | 41 | +33 | 39 | |
| 3 | Carshalton Athletic | 28 | 17 | 4 | 7 | 65 | 38 | +27 | 38 | |
| 4 | Slough Town | 28 | 12 | 10 | 6 | 58 | 49 | +9 | 34 | |
| 5 | Uxbridge | 28 | 11 | 8 | 9 | 62 | 46 | +16 | 30 | |
| 6 | Maidenhead United | 28 | 11 | 6 | 11 | 50 | 63 | −13 | 28 | |
| 7 | Yiewsley | 28 | 12 | 3 | 13 | 49 | 46 | +3 | 27 | |
| 8 | Edgware Town | 28 | 10 | 7 | 11 | 58 | 60 | −2 | 27 | |
| 9 | Chesham United | 28 | 12 | 3 | 13 | 56 | 73 | −17 | 27 | |
| 10 | Erith & Belvedere | 28 | 10 | 8 | 10 | 57 | 56 | +1 | 26 (Note: Erith & Belvedere had two points deducted) | |
| 11 | Worthing | 28 | 10 | 4 | 14 | 54 | 62 | −8 | 24 | |
| 12 | Maidstone United | 28 | 9 | 5 | 14 | 48 | 50 | −2 | 23 | |
| 13 | Tilbury | 28 | 9 | 5 | 14 | 46 | 55 | −9 | 23 | |
| 14 | Eastbourne | 28 | 3 | 7 | 18 | 24 | 63 | −39 | 13 | |
| 15 | Epsom | 28 | 3 | 6 | 19 | 41 | 83 | −42 | 12 | |

Source: Non-League Matters

== 1955–56 ==
| Pos | Team | Pld | W | D | L | GF | GA | GD | Pts | Result |
|---|---|---|---|---|---|---|---|---|---|---|
| 1 | Maidstone United | 26 | 19 | 3 | 4 | 74 | 36 | +38 | 41 | |
| 2 | Yiewsley | 26 | 15 | 5 | 6 | 62 | 31 | +31 | 35 | |
| 3 | Uxbridge | 26 | 14 | 5 | 7 | 55 | 34 | +21 | 33 | |
| 4 | Slough Town | 26 | 14 | 5 | 7 | 59 | 38 | +21 | 33 | |
| 5 | Epsom | 26 | 14 | 3 | 9 | 58 | 42 | +16 | 31 | |
| 6 | Maidenhead United | 26 | 13 | 4 | 9 | 59 | 45 | +14 | 30 | |
| 7 | Carshalton Athletic | 26 | 12 | 3 | 11 | 50 | 41 | +9 | 27 | Promotion to Athenian League |
| 8 | Grays Athletic | 26 | 12 | 3 | 11 | 47 | 50 | −3 | 27 | |
| 9 | Tilbury | 26 | 9 | 6 | 11 | 43 | 55 | −12 | 24 | |
| 10 | Edgware Town | 26 | 7 | 7 | 12 | 31 | 53 | −22 | 21 | |
| 11 | Worthing | 26 | 7 | 5 | 14 | 57 | 71 | −14 | 19 | |
| 12 | Eastbourne | 26 | 6 | 4 | 16 | 29 | 54 | −25 | 16 | |
| 13 | Erith & Belvedere | 26 | 6 | 2 | 18 | 33 | 70 | −37 | 14 | |
| 14 | Chesham United | 26 | 6 | 1 | 19 | 34 | 71 | −37 | 13 | |

Source: Non-League Matters

== 1956–57 ==
Two new clubs joined the league for the 1956–57 season:

- Dorking (from the Surrey Senior League)
- Wembley (from the Delphian League)

| Pos | Team | Pld | W | D | L | GF | GA | GD | Pts | Result |
|---|---|---|---|---|---|---|---|---|---|---|
| 1 | Yiewsley | 28 | 18 | 6 | 4 | 73 | 35 | +38 | 42 | |
| 2 | Grays Athletic | 28 | 16 | 8 | 4 | 81 | 43 | +38 | 40 | |
| 3 | Maidenhead United | 28 | 17 | 5 | 6 | 88 | 50 | +38 | 39 | |
| 4 | Epsom | 28 | 18 | 2 | 8 | 76 | 37 | +39 | 38 | |
| 5 | Maidstone United | 28 | 15 | 6 | 7 | 82 | 41 | +41 | 36 | Promotion to Athenian League |
| 6 | Slough Town | 28 | 12 | 9 | 7 | 63 | 42 | +21 | 33 | |
| 7 | Eastbourne | 28 | 12 | 6 | 10 | 67 | 56 | +11 | 30 | |
| 8 | Uxbridge | 28 | 12 | 6 | 10 | 54 | 52 | +2 | 30 | |
| 9 | Wembley | 28 | 9 | 8 | 11 | 53 | 54 | −1 | 26 | |
| 10 | Erith & Belvedere | 28 | 11 | 3 | 14 | 51 | 66 | −15 | 25 | |
| 11 | Edgware Town | 28 | 7 | 7 | 14 | 48 | 72 | −24 | 21 | |
| 12 | Dorking | 28 | 7 | 5 | 16 | 51 | 80 | −29 | 19 | |
| 13 | Tilbury | 28 | 8 | 3 | 17 | 31 | 78 | −47 | 19 | Joined London League |
| 14 | Chesham United | 28 | 4 | 5 | 19 | 38 | 83 | −45 | 13 | |
| 15 | Worthing | 28 | 2 | 5 | 21 | 34 | 101 | −67 | 9 | |

Source: Non-League Matters

== 1957–58 ==
Two new clubs joined the league for the 1957–58 season:

- Dagenham (from the Delphian League)
- Horsham (from the Metropolitan League)

| Pos | Team | Pld | W | D | L | GF | GA | GD | Pts | Result |
|---|---|---|---|---|---|---|---|---|---|---|
| 1 | Maidenhead United | 28 | 20 | 3 | 5 | 65 | 39 | +26 | 43 | |
| 2 | Slough Town | 28 | 18 | 6 | 4 | 72 | 41 | +31 | 42 | |
| 3 | Grays Athletic | 28 | 17 | 6 | 5 | 82 | 28 | +54 | 40 | Promotion to Athenian League |
| 4 | Yiewsley | 28 | 13 | 8 | 7 | 56 | 36 | +20 | 34 | Promotion to Southern League |
| 5 | Edgware Town | 28 | 13 | 5 | 10 | 59 | 54 | +5 | 31 | |
| 6 | Uxbridge | 28 | 12 | 7 | 9 | 57 | 53 | +4 | 31 | |
| 7 | Dagenham | 28 | 11 | 8 | 9 | 38 | 40 | −2 | 30 | |
| 8 | Epsom | 28 | 12 | 5 | 11 | 64 | 60 | +4 | 29 | |
| 9 | Erith & Belvedere | 28 | 11 | 2 | 15 | 44 | 57 | −13 | 24 | |
| 10 | Eastbourne | 28 | 7 | 9 | 12 | 40 | 50 | −10 | 23 | |
| 11 | Wembley | 28 | 9 | 4 | 15 | 48 | 54 | −6 | 22 | |
| 12 | Chesham United | 28 | 9 | 4 | 15 | 40 | 50 | −10 | 22 | |
| 13 | Horsham | 28 | 6 | 5 | 17 | 50 | 77 | −27 | 17 | |
| 14 | Dorking | 28 | 4 | 9 | 15 | 37 | 63 | −26 | 17 | |
| 15 | Worthing | 28 | 6 | 3 | 19 | 48 | 98 | −50 | 15 | |

Source: Non-League Matters

== 1958–59 ==
One new club joined the league for the 1958–59 season:

- Leatherhead (from the Delphian League)

| Pos | Team | Pld | W | D | L | GF | GA | GD | Pts |
|---|---|---|---|---|---|---|---|---|---|
| 1 | Dagenham | 26 | 19 | 2 | 5 | 70 | 36 | +34 | 40 |
| 2 | Maidenhead United | 26 | 14 | 7 | 5 | 63 | 38 | +25 | 35 |
| 3 | Slough Town | 26 | 14 | 5 | 7 | 75 | 41 | +34 | 33 |
| 4 | Wembley | 26 | 13 | 4 | 9 | 61 | 44 | +17 | 30 |
| 5 | Leatherhead | 26 | 13 | 4 | 9 | 58 | 54 | +4 | 30 |
| 6 | Dorking | 26 | 9 | 8 | 9 | 45 | 40 | +5 | 26 |
| 7 | Uxbridge | 26 | 11 | 3 | 12 | 58 | 63 | −5 | 25 |
| 8 | Edgware Town | 26 | 11 | 3 | 12 | 49 | 67 | −18 | 25 |
| 9 | Horsham | 26 | 9 | 5 | 12 | 66 | 68 | −2 | 23 |
| 10 | Erith & Belvedere | 26 | 8 | 7 | 11 | 43 | 53 | −10 | 23 |
| 11 | Chesham United | 26 | 8 | 6 | 12 | 45 | 57 | −12 | 22 |
| 12 | Epsom | 26 | 8 | 6 | 12 | 44 | 57 | −13 | 22 |
| 13 | Eastbourne | 26 | 5 | 7 | 14 | 28 | 50 | −22 | 17 |
| 14 | Worthing | 26 | 5 | 3 | 18 | 45 | 82 | −37 | 13 |

Source: Non-League Matters

== 1959–60 ==
Two new clubs joined the league for the 1959–60 season:

- Letchworth Town (from the Delphian League)
- Wokingham Town (from the Delphian League)

| Pos | Team | Pld | W | D | L | GF | GA | GD | Pts | Qualification |
|---|---|---|---|---|---|---|---|---|---|---|
| 1 | Uxbridge | 30 | 20 | 4 | 6 | 72 | 40 | +32 | 44 | |
| 2 | Maidenhead United | 30 | 16 | 6 | 8 | 70 | 40 | +30 | 38 | |
| 3 | Dorking | 30 | 17 | 3 | 10 | 69 | 47 | +22 | 37 | |
| 4 | Epsom | 30 | 17 | 2 | 11 | 70 | 55 | +15 | 36 | Changed name to Epsom & Ewell |
| 5 | Letchworth Town | 30 | 14 | 6 | 10 | 68 | 62 | +6 | 34 | |
| 6 | Dagenham | 30 | 13 | 7 | 10 | 50 | 40 | +10 | 33 | |
| 7 | Slough Town | 30 | 14 | 4 | 12 | 54 | 53 | +1 | 32 | |
| 8 | Horsham | 30 | 13 | 5 | 12 | 68 | 64 | +4 | 31 | |
| 9 | Wokingham Town | 30 | 11 | 7 | 12 | 62 | 51 | +11 | 29 | |
| 10 | Worthing | 30 | 11 | 7 | 12 | 70 | 74 | −4 | 29 | |
| 11 | Erith & Belvedere | 30 | 10 | 9 | 11 | 62 | 66 | −4 | 29 | |
| 12 | Leatherhead | 30 | 12 | 3 | 15 | 56 | 63 | −7 | 27 | |
| 13 | Chesham United | 30 | 11 | 4 | 15 | 45 | 60 | −15 | 26 | |
| 14 | Wembley | 30 | 11 | 3 | 16 | 56 | 77 | −21 | 25 | |
| 15 | Eastbourne | 30 | 8 | 4 | 18 | 41 | 67 | −26 | 20 | |
| 16 | Edgware Town | 30 | 4 | 2 | 24 | 37 | 91 | −54 | 10 | |

Source: Non-League Matters

== 1960–61 ==
| Pos | Team | Pld | W | D | L | GF | GA | GD | Pts |
|---|---|---|---|---|---|---|---|---|---|
| 1 | Maidenhead United | 30 | 19 | 5 | 6 | 65 | 39 | +26 | 43 |
| 2 | Chesham United | 30 | 19 | 2 | 9 | 73 | 38 | +35 | 40 |
| 3 | Edgware Town | 30 | 17 | 6 | 7 | 70 | 40 | +30 | 40 |
| 4 | Dagenham | 30 | 18 | 3 | 9 | 82 | 55 | +27 | 39 |
| 5 | Horsham | 30 | 17 | 3 | 10 | 85 | 77 | +8 | 37 |
| 6 | Uxbridge | 30 | 15 | 5 | 10 | 50 | 40 | +10 | 35 |
| 7 | Worthing | 30 | 14 | 5 | 11 | 85 | 67 | +18 | 33 |
| 8 | Letchworth Town | 30 | 15 | 3 | 12 | 64 | 66 | −2 | 33 |
| 9 | Dorking | 30 | 12 | 6 | 12 | 64 | 61 | +3 | 30 |
| 10 | Erith & Belvedere | 30 | 10 | 7 | 13 | 59 | 57 | +2 | 27 |
| 11 | Eastbourne | 30 | 10 | 6 | 14 | 50 | 59 | −9 | 26 |
| 12 | Epsom & Ewell | 30 | 11 | 3 | 16 | 46 | 77 | −31 | 25 |
| 13 | Leatherhead | 30 | 9 | 4 | 17 | 68 | 93 | −25 | 22 |
| 14 | Wokingham Town | 30 | 8 | 5 | 17 | 44 | 60 | −16 | 21 |
| 15 | Wembley | 30 | 6 | 6 | 18 | 51 | 80 | −29 | 18 |
| 16 | Slough Town | 30 | 4 | 3 | 23 | 48 | 95 | −47 | 11 |

Source: Non-League Matters

== 1961–62 ==
| Pos | Team | Pld | W | D | L | GF | GA | GD | Pts |
|---|---|---|---|---|---|---|---|---|---|
| 1 | Maidenhead United | 30 | 23 | 3 | 4 | 77 | 31 | +46 | 49 |
| 2 | Chesham United | 30 | 19 | 4 | 7 | 64 | 34 | +30 | 42 |
| 3 | Horsham | 30 | 18 | 3 | 9 | 88 | 57 | +31 | 39 |
| 4 | Edgware Town | 30 | 15 | 7 | 8 | 47 | 40 | +7 | 37 |
| 5 | Dagenham | 30 | 16 | 3 | 11 | 65 | 49 | +16 | 35 |
| 6 | Uxbridge | 30 | 14 | 5 | 11 | 47 | 41 | +6 | 33 |
| 7 | Erith & Belvedere | 30 | 14 | 5 | 11 | 56 | 57 | −1 | 33 |
| 8 | Slough Town | 30 | 12 | 5 | 13 | 47 | 49 | −2 | 29 |
| 9 | Wokingham Town | 30 | 11 | 6 | 13 | 50 | 49 | +1 | 28 |
| 10 | Leatherhead | 30 | 10 | 7 | 13 | 63 | 52 | +11 | 27 |
| 11 | Letchworth Town | 30 | 8 | 9 | 13 | 55 | 65 | −10 | 25 |
| 12 | Worthing | 30 | 10 | 5 | 15 | 52 | 67 | −15 | 25 |
| 13 | Eastbourne | 30 | 8 | 6 | 16 | 39 | 57 | −18 | 22 |
| 14 | Dorking | 30 | 8 | 6 | 16 | 55 | 90 | −35 | 22 |
| 15 | Epsom & Ewell | 30 | 8 | 2 | 20 | 47 | 81 | −34 | 18 |
| 16 | Wembley | 30 | 7 | 2 | 21 | 40 | 73 | −33 | 16 |

Source: Non-League Matters

== 1962–63 ==
| Pos | Team | Pld | W | D | L | GF | GA | GD | Pts | Result |
|---|---|---|---|---|---|---|---|---|---|---|
| 1 | Leatherhead | 30 | 22 | 5 | 3 | 88 | 36 | +52 | 49 | Joined Athenian League Division One |
| 2 | Erith & Belvedere | 30 | 18 | 6 | 6 | 61 | 32 | +29 | 42 | Joined Athenian League Division One |
| 3 | Wokingham Town | 30 | 18 | 5 | 7 | 53 | 41 | +12 | 41 | Joined Athenian League Division One |
| 4 | Dagenham | 30 | 15 | 8 | 7 | 64 | 47 | +17 | 38 | Promotion to Athenian League Premier Division |
| 5 | Uxbridge | 30 | 15 | 7 | 8 | 73 | 51 | +22 | 37 | Joined Athenian League Division One |
| 6 | Letchworth Town | 30 | 16 | 3 | 11 | 75 | 50 | +25 | 35 | Joined Athenian League Division One |
| 7 | Maidenhead United | 30 | 12 | 9 | 9 | 61 | 46 | +15 | 33 | Promotion to Athenian League Premier Division |
| 8 | Slough Town | 30 | 12 | 9 | 9 | 62 | 54 | +8 | 33 | Joined Athenian League Division One |
| 9 | Chesham United | 30 | 11 | 6 | 13 | 66 | 59 | +7 | 28 | Joined Athenian League Division One |
| 10 | Worthing | 30 | 12 | 4 | 14 | 63 | 78 | −15 | 28 | Joined Athenian League Division One |
| 11 | Dorking | 30 | 9 | 6 | 15 | 56 | 70 | −14 | 24 | Joined Athenian League Division One |
| 12 | Horsham | 30 | 10 | 3 | 17 | 50 | 74 | −24 | 23 | Joined Athenian League Division One |
| 13 | Edgware Town | 30 | 9 | 5 | 16 | 43 | 66 | −23 | 23 | Joined Athenian League Division One |
| 14 | Eastbourne | 30 | 7 | 5 | 18 | 43 | 76 | −33 | 19 | Joined Athenian League Division One |
| 15 | Epsom & Ewell | 30 | 5 | 5 | 20 | 31 | 82 | −51 | 15 | Joined Athenian League Division One |
| 16 | Wembley | 30 | 4 | 4 | 22 | 46 | 73 | −27 | 12 | Joined Athenian League Division One |

Source: Non-League Matters
