= 1947–48 Sussex County Football League =

Sussex County Football League
- Season: 1947–48
- Champions: Southwick
- Matches played: 182
- Goals scored: 944 (5.19 per match)

The 1947–48 Sussex County Football League season was the 23rd in the history of the competition.

== League table ==
The league featured 14 clubs which competed in the last season, no new clubs joined the league this season.

=== League table ===
| Pos | Team | Pld | W | D | L | GF | GA | GR | Pts | Qualification or relegation |
|---|---|---|---|---|---|---|---|---|---|---|
| 1 | Southwick | 26 | 22 | 2 | 2 | 122 | 34 | 3.588 | 46 | |
| 2 | Horsham | 26 | 20 | 2 | 4 | 98 | 45 | 2.178 | 42 | |
| 3 | Haywards Heath | 26 | 14 | 6 | 6 | 79 | 52 | 1.519 | 34 | |
| 4 | Chichester | 26 | 13 | 6 | 7 | 76 | 51 | 1.490 | 32 | |
| 5 | Worthing | 26 | 14 | 3 | 9 | 72 | 57 | 1.263 | 31 | Joined Corinthian League |
| 6 | Littlehampton Town | 26 | 14 | 3 | 9 | 73 | 62 | 1.177 | 31 | |
| 7 | Hove | 26 | 13 | 3 | 10 | 81 | 76 | 1.066 | 29 | |
| 8 | East Grinstead | 26 | 9 | 5 | 12 | 61 | 61 | 1.000 | 23 | |
| 9 | Bognor Regis | 26 | 9 | 3 | 14 | 49 | 87 | 0.563 | 21 | |
| 10 | Eastbourne Comrades | 26 | 7 | 2 | 17 | 45 | 85 | 0.529 | 16 | |
| 11 | Bexhill Town Athletic | 26 | 5 | 6 | 15 | 46 | 88 | 0.523 | 16 | |
| 12 | Shoreham | 26 | 6 | 3 | 17 | 50 | 75 | 0.667 | 15 | |
| 13 | Newhaven | 26 | 4 | 6 | 16 | 52 | 87 | 0.598 | 14 | |
| 14 | Lewes | 26 | 3 | 8 | 15 | 40 | 84 | 0.476 | 14 | |

Source: Non-League Matters
Rules for classification: 1) points; 2) goal difference; 3) number of goals scored.
The points system until the 1982–83 season: 2 points for a win, 1 point for a draw and 0 points for losing.
