= 1984–85 FA Cup =

Tournament details
- Country: England; Wales

Final positions
- Champions: Manchester United (6th title)
- Runners-up: Everton

Tournament statistics
- Top goal scorer: Ian Rush (7)

The 1984–85 FA Cup was the 104th staging of the world's oldest football knockout competition, the Football Association Challenge Cup, or FA Cup. The competition was won by Manchester United, who defeated Everton 1–0 at Wembley, thus denying Everton the double just 3 days after winning the European Cup Winners' Cup. The final was also notable for seeing the first sending off, with Kevin Moran obtaining the unwanted distinction.

== Qualifying rounds ==
Most participating clubs that were not members of the Football League competed in the qualifying rounds to secure one of 28 places available in the first round.

The winners from the fourth qualifying round were Penrith, Stalybridge Celtic, Goole Town, Blue Star, Whitby Town, Tow Law Town, Macclesfield Town, Frickley Athletic, Nuneaton Borough, Barnet, King's Lynn, Burton Albion, VS Rugby, Kettering Town, Buckingham Town, Metropolitan Police, Fisher Athletic, Bishop's Stortford, Dagenham, Enfield, Dartford, Staines Town, Barry Town, Weymouth, Bognor Regis Town, Yeovil Town, Farnborough Town and Windsor & Eton.

Appearing in the competition proper for the first time were Blue Star, VS Rugby, Buckingham Town, Fisher Athletic and Staines Town. Of the others, King's Lynn had last featured at this stage in 1973–74, Bognor Regis Town had last done so in 1972–73, Tow Law Town had last done so in 1968–69, Barry Town had last done so in 1961–62, Stalybridge Celtic had last done so in 1947–48 and Metropolitan Police had last done so in 1931–32.

Additionally, Barry Town – competing exclusively in the Welsh League this season – became the first club from outside the English football system to reach the first round of the FA Cup since (Northern) Irish side Distillery in 1889–90.

== First round proper ==
The 48 teams from the Football League Third and Fourth Divisions entered in this round along with the 28 non-league qualifiers and Northwich Victoria, Bangor City, Altrincham and Telford United who were given byes. The first round of games were played over the weekend 17–19 November 1984. Replays were played on 19–20 November, except that for Swindon Town and Dagenham, which was played on 26 November. Blue Star, from the Wearside League at Step 10 of the English football system, was ostensibly the lowest-ranked team in the round as the Welsh League was the highest-standard football competition in Wales at the time.

Tie no	Home team	Score	Away team	Date
1	Blackpool	0–1	Altrincham (5)	17 November 1984
2	Darlington	3–2	Chester City	17 November 1984
3	Penrith (8)	0–9	Burnley	17 November 1984
4	Preston North End	4–3	Bury	17 November 1984
5	Rochdale	1–2	Doncaster Rovers	17 November 1984
6	Weymouth (5)	0–3	Millwall	17 November 1984
7	Gillingham	2–1	Windsor & Eton (6)	17 November 1984
8	Northwich Victoria (5)	3–1	Crewe Alexandra	17 November 1984
9	Macclesfield Town (6)	1–2	Port Vale	17 November 1984
10	Lincoln City	1–1	Telford United (5)	17 November 1984
Replay	Telford United	2–1	Lincoln City	20 November 1984
11	Wrexham	0–2	Wigan Athletic	17 November 1984
12	Stockport County	1–2	Walsall	17 November 1984
13	Bangor City (6)	1–1	Tranmere Rovers	17 November 1984
Replay	Tranmere Rovers	7–0	Bangor City	20 November 1984
14	Brentford	4–0	Bishop's Stortford (6)	17 November 1984
15	Bristol Rovers	2–1	King's Lynn (6)	17 November 1984
16	Northampton Town	2–2	VS Rugby (7)	17 November 1984
Replay	VS Rugby	0–1	Northampton Town	21 November 1984
17	Plymouth Argyle	3–0	Barnet (5)	17 November 1984
18	Bradford City	7–2	Tow Law Town (8)	17 November 1984
19	Hull City	2–1	Bolton Wanderers	17 November 1984
20	Southend United	2–2	Colchester United	17 November 1984
Replay	Colchester United	3–2	Southend United	21 November 1984
21	Exeter City	2–2	Enfield (5)	17 November 1984
Replay	Enfield	3–0	Exeter City	20 November 1984
22	Mansfield Town	2–1	Rotherham United	17 November 1984
23	Halifax Town	2–0	Goole Town (6)	17 November 1984
24	Newport County	1–1	Aldershot	17 November 1984
Replay	Aldershot	4–0	Newport County	20 November 1984
25	Torquay United	2–0	Yeovil Town (5)	17 November 1984
26	York City	2–0	Blue Star (10)	17 November 1984
27	Metropolitan Police (7)	0–3	Dartford (5)	17 November 1984
28	Hereford United	3–0	Farnborough Town (7)	17 November 1984
29	Kettering Town (5)	0–0	AFC Bournemouth	17 November 1984
Replay	AFC Bournemouth	3–2	Kettering Town	20 November 1984
30	Barry Town (*)	1–2	Reading	17 November 1984
31	Nuneaton Borough (5)	1–1	Scunthorpe United	17 November 1984
Replay	Scunthorpe United	2–1	Nuneaton Borough	20 November 1984
32	Whitby Town (8)	1–3	Chesterfield	17 November 1984
33	Buckingham Town (8)	0–2	Orient	17 November 1984
34	Burton Albion (6)	2–0	Staines Town (7)	17 November 1984
35	Dagenham (5)	0–0	Swindon Town	19 November 1984
Replay	Swindon Town	1–2	Dagenham	26 November 1984
36	Cambridge United	0–2	Peterborough United	17 November 1984
37	Swansea City	1–1	Bognor Regis Town (6)	17 November 1984
Replay	Bognor Regis Town	3–1	Swansea City	21 November 1984
38	Frickley Athletic (5)	2–1	Stalybridge Celtic (8)	17 November 1984
39	Hartlepool United	2–1	Derby County	17 November 1984
40	Fisher Athletic (6)	0–1	Bristol City	17 November 1984

(* Barry Town was competing in the Welsh Football League National Division, outside the English football system, this season.)

== Second round proper ==
The second round of games were played over 7–8 December 1984, with replays being played on 11, 12 and 17 December. The round featured two teams from Step 6 of the English football system: Bognor Regis Town from the Isthmian League Premier Division and Burton Albion from the Northern Premier League.

Tie no	Home team	Score	Away team	Date
1	Darlington	1–0	Frickley Athletic (5)	8 December 1984
2	Dartford (5)	1–1	AFC Bournemouth	8 December 1984
Replay	AFC Bournemouth	4–1	Dartford	11 December 1984
3	Bristol City	1–3	Bristol Rovers	8 December 1984
4	Burnley	3–1	Halifax Town	8 December 1984
5	Preston North End	1–4	Telford United (5)	8 December 1984
6	Reading	6–2	Bognor Regis Town (6)	8 December 1984
7	Walsall	1–0	Chesterfield	8 December 1984
8	Tranmere Rovers	0–3	Hull City	8 December 1984
9	Brentford	2–2	Northampton Town	8 December 1984
Replay	Northampton Town	0–2	Brentford	17 December 1984
10	Plymouth Argyle	0–0	Hereford United	8 December 1984
Replay	Hereford United	2–0	Plymouth Argyle	12 December 1984
11	Bradford City	2–1	Mansfield Town	8 December 1984
12	Millwall	1–0	Enfield (5)	8 December 1984
13	Altrincham (5)	1–3	Doncaster Rovers	8 December 1984
14	Port Vale	4–1	Scunthorpe United	7 December 1984
15	Aldershot	0–2	Burton Albion (6)	8 December 1984
16	Wigan Athletic	2–1	Northwich Victoria (5)	8 December 1984
17	Colchester United	0–5	Gillingham	8 December 1984
18	Dagenham (5)	1–0	Peterborough United	8 December 1984
19	Orient	3–0	Torquay United	8 December 1984
20	Hartlepool United	0–2	York City	8 December 1984

== Third round proper ==
Teams from the Football League First and Second Division entered in this round. Most of the third round of games in the FA Cup were played over the weekend 4–6 January 1985, with the exception of the Gillingham-Cardiff City match. Replays took place at various times over the period 8–28 January.

Burton Albion (Step 6) was again the lowest-ranked team in the round. The FA ordered their tie with Leicester City to a replay behind closed doors after the Albion goalkeeper had been struck by a bottle in the first game (played at the Baseball Ground in Derby) which had ended in a 6–1 win for Leicester. The replay was held at Coventry City's Highfield Road stadium.

Tie no	Home team	Score	Away team	Date
1	Liverpool (1)	3–0	Aston Villa (1)	5 January 1985
2	Southampton (1)	4–0	Sunderland (1)	5 January 1985
3	Watford (1)	5–0	Sheffield United (2)	5 January 1985
4	Gillingham (3)	2–1	Cardiff City (2)	21 January 1985
5	Notts County (2)	2–2	Grimsby Town (2)	5 January 1985
Replay	Grimsby Town	4–2	Notts County	8 January 1985
6	Nottingham Forest (1)	1–1	Newcastle United (1)	6 January 1985
Replay	Newcastle United	1–3	Nottingham Forest	9 January 1985
7	Wolverhampton Wanderers (2)	1–1	Huddersfield Town (2)	5 January 1985
Replay	Huddersfield Town	3–1	Wolverhampton Wanderers	23 January 1985
8	Middlesbrough (2)	0–0	Darlington (4)	5 January 1985
Replay	Darlington	2–1	Middlesbrough	8 January 1985
9	Luton Town (1)	1–1	Stoke City (1)	5 January 1985
Replay	Stoke City	2–3	Luton Town	9 January 1985
10	Shrewsbury Town (2)	0–2	Oxford United (2)	5 January 1985
11	Doncaster Rovers (3)	1–0	Queens Park Rangers (1)	5 January 1985
12	Tottenham Hotspur (1)	1–1	Charlton Athletic (2)	5 January 1985
Replay	Charlton Athletic	1–2	Tottenham Hotspur	23 January 1985
13	Fulham (2)	2–3	Sheffield Wednesday (1)	5 January 1985
14	Barnsley (2)	4–3	Reading (3)	5 January 1985
15	Bristol Rovers (3)	1–2	Ipswich Town (1)	5 January 1985
16	Coventry City (1)	2–1	Manchester City (2)	5 January 1985
17	Portsmouth (2)	0–0	Blackburn Rovers (2)	5 January 1985
Replay	Blackburn Rovers	2–1	Portsmouth	26 January 1985
18	West Ham United (1)	4–1	Port Vale (4)	5 January 1985
19	Brighton & Hove Albion (2)	1–0	Hull City (3)	5 January 1985
20	Manchester United (1)	3–0	AFC Bournemouth (3)	5 January 1985
21	Millwall (3)	1–1	Crystal Palace (2)	5 January 1985
Replay	Crystal Palace	1–2	Millwall	23 January 1985
22	Carlisle United (2)	1–0	Dagenham (5)	5 January 1985
23	Oldham Athletic (2)	2–1	Brentford (3)	5 January 1985
24	Chelsea (1)	2–2	Wigan Athletic (3)	5 January 1985
Replay	Wigan Athletic	0–5	Chelsea	26 January 1985
25	Wimbledon (2)	3–1	Burnley (3)	5 January 1985
26	Leeds United (2)	0–2	Everton (1)	4 January 1985
27	York City (3)	3–0	Walsall (3)	5 January 1985
28	Hereford United (4)	1–1	Arsenal (1)	5 January 1985
Replay	Arsenal	7–2	Hereford United	22 January 1985
29	Birmingham City (2)	0–0	Norwich City (1)	5 January 1985
Replay	Norwich City	1–1	Birmingham City	23 January 1985
Replay	Birmingham City	1–1	Norwich City	26 January 1985
Replay	Norwich City	1–0	Birmingham City	28 January 1985
30	Burton Albion (6)	1–6	Leicester City (1)	5 January 1985
Replay	Burton Albion	0–1	Leicester City	16 January 1985
31	Orient (3)	2–1	West Bromwich Albion (1)	5 January 1985
32	Telford United (5)	2–1	Bradford City (3)	5 January 1985

== Fourth round proper ==
The fourth round of games were mainly played over the weekend 26–27 January 1985. Some games were instead played or replayed on 29–30 January or 4 February. Telford United, from the Alliance Premier League (Step 5), was the lowest-ranked team in the round and became the first non-league club to defeat four Football League opponents in one tournament since Tottenham Hotspur in that club's 1900-01 Cup-winning campaign.

Tie no	Home team	Score	Away team	Date
1	Darlington	1–1	Telford United (5)	29 January 1985
Replay	Telford United	3–0	Darlington	4 February 1985
2	Liverpool	1–0	Tottenham Hotspur	27 January 1985
3	Leicester City	1–0	Carlisle United	26 January 1985
4	Nottingham Forest	0–0	Wimbledon	26 January 1985
Replay	Wimbledon	1–0	Nottingham Forest	30 January 1985
5	Sheffield Wednesday	5–1	Oldham Athletic	26 January 1985
6	Grimsby Town	1–3	Watford	26 January 1985
7	Luton Town	2–0	Huddersfield Town	26 January 1985
8	Everton	2–0	Doncaster Rovers	26 January 1985
9	Ipswich Town	3–2	Gillingham	26 January 1985
10	Barnsley	2–1	Brighton & Hove Albion	26 January 1985
11	West Ham United	2–1	Norwich City	4 February 1985
12	Manchester United	2–1	Coventry City	26 January 1985
13	Chelsea	2–3	Millwall	4 February 1985
14	York City	1–0	Arsenal	26 January 1985
15	Oxford United	0–1	Blackburn Rovers	30 January 1985
16	Orient	0–2	Southampton	26 January 1985

== Fifth round proper ==
The fifth set of games were intended to be played on 15–16 February 1985, but most of these matches were not played until 4 March, with replays taking place on 6 March. Telford United was the last non-league club left in the competition.

Tie no	Home team	Score	Away team	Date
1	Southampton	1–2	Barnsley	4 March 1985
2	Blackburn Rovers	0–2	Manchester United	15 February 1985
3	Luton Town	0–0	Watford	4 March 1985
Replay	Watford	2–2	Luton Town	6 March 1985
Replay	Luton Town	1–0	Watford	9 March 1985
4	Everton	3–0	Telford United (5)	16 February 1985
5	Ipswich Town	3–2	Sheffield Wednesday	4 March 1985
6	Millwall	2–0	Leicester City	19 February 1985
7	Wimbledon	1–1	West Ham United	4 March 1985
Replay	West Ham United	5–1	Wimbledon	6 March 1985
8	York City	1–1	Liverpool	16 February 1985
Replay	Liverpool	7–0	York City	20 February 1985

== Sixth round proper ==
The sixth round of FA Cup games were played either at the weekend on 9–10 March or midweek on 13 March 1985. A replay was also played on this later date.

Former Everton manager Harry Catterick collapsed and died at the ground shortly after the first match between Everton and Ipswich Town. Everton players wore black armbands in the replay in his memory. The match between Luton Town and Millwall was suspended for 25 minutes by crowd violence.

9 March 1985

Everton	2–2	Ipswich Town
Sheedy 5'; Mountfield 85'	Report	Wilson 15'; Zondervan 31'

Goodison Park, Liverpool
Attendance: 36,468
Referee: Alan Robinson (Waterlooville)

9 March 1985

Manchester United	4–2	West Ham United
Hughes 21'; Whiteside 39', 74', 88' (pen.)		Hogg 36' (o.g.); Allen 84'

Old Trafford, Manchester
Attendance: 46,769
Referee: Trelford Mills (Barnsley)

10 March 1985

Barnsley	0–4	Liverpool
	Report	Rush 55', 80', 84'; Whelan 72'

Oakwell, Barnsley
Attendance: 19,838
Referee: Colin Downey (Hounslow)

13 March 1985

Luton Town	1 – 0	Millwall
B. Stein 31'

Kenilworth Road, Luton
Referee: David Hutchinson (Harrogate)

=== Replay ===
13 March 1985

Ipswich Town	0–1	Everton
	Report	Sharp 76' (pen.)

Portman Road, Ipswich
Attendance: 27,737
Referee: Alan Robinson

== Semi-finals ==
13 April 1985

Manchester United	2–2 (a.e.t)	Liverpool
Robson 69'; Stapleton 98'	Report	Whelan 87'; Walsh 119'

Goodison Park, Liverpool
Attendance: 51,690
Referee: George Courtney (Spennymoor)

13 April 1985

Everton	2–1 (a.e.t)	Luton Town
Sheedy 85'; Mountfield 115'	Report	Hill 38'

Villa Park, Birmingham
Attendance: 45.289
Referee: John Martin (Alton, Hampshire)

=== Replay ===
17 April 1985

Liverpool	1–2	Manchester United
McGrath 39' (o.g.)	Report	Robson 46'; Hughes 58'

Maine Road
Attendance: 45,775
Referee: Keith Hackett (Sheffield)

== Final ==
18 May 1985
15:00 BST

Manchester United	1–0 (a.e.t.)	Everton
Moran (red card) 78'; Whiteside 110'

Wembley Stadium, London
Attendance: 100,000
Referee: Peter Willis (County Durham)

== Television coverage ==
The right to show FA Cup games were, as with Football League matches, shared between the BBC and ITV. As per the arrangements of the previous season four games were allowed to be screened Live from the Third round to the sixth and shared between the two companies, as well as the Final. For the first time since 1970 ITV nationally screened a second round tie with highlights of Reading v Bognor Regis Town. Replays were shared between the two companies.

First Round BBC Met Police v Dartford (Report only)

Second Round BBC Dagenham v Peterborough United (Report only)

ITV Reading v Bognor Regis Town (Highlights shown nationally after the league game Southampton v Arsenal and the World Club Championship match from Tokyo with commentary from Peter Brackley)

Third Round BBC Leeds United v Everton (Live–Friday Evening) ITV Fulham v Sheffield Wednesday Hereford United v Arsenal Liverpool v Aston Villa Newcastle United v Nottingham Forest (Midweek replay) Charlton Athletic v Tottenham Hotspur (Midweek replay)

Fourth Round BBC York City v Arsenal Orient v Southampton Grimsby Town v Watford Wimbledon v Nottingham Forest (Midweek replay) ITV Liverpool v Tottenham Hotspur (Live–Sunday Afternoon)

Fifth Round BBC Blackburn Rovers v Manchester United (Live–Friday Evening) Luton Town v Watford (Saturday 2nd replay) ITV York City v Liverpool Everton v Telford United

Sixth Round BBC Manchester United v West Ham United Everton v Ipswich Town Luton Town v Millwall (Midweek) Ipswich Town v Everton (Midweek replay) ITV Barnsley v Liverpool (Live–Sunday Afternoon)

Semi-Finals BBC Everton v Luton Town ITV Liverpool v Manchester United Liverpool v Manchester United (Midweek replay)

Final Everton v Manchester United shown Live by both the BBC and ITV.
