= 1957–58 Hellenic Football League =

The 1957–58 Hellenic Football League season was the fifth in the history of the Hellenic Football League, a football competition in England.

== Premier Division ==
Hellenic Football League Premier Division
- Season: 1957–58
- Champions: Witney Town
- Matches: 240
- Goals: 1,221 (5.09 per match)

The Premier Division featured 15 clubs which competed in the division last season, along with one new club:

- Luton Town Colts, promoted from Division One

Also, Bletchley & Wipac changed name to Bletchley Town.

=== League table ===
| Pos | Team | Pld | W | D | L | GF | GA | GR | Pts | Promotion or relegation |
|---|---|---|---|---|---|---|---|---|---|---|
| 1 | Witney Town | 30 | 22 | 1 | 7 | 112 | 54 | 2.074 | 45 | |
| 2 | Dunstable Town reserves | 30 | 21 | 2 | 7 | 117 | 60 | 1.950 | 44 | Resigned from the league |
| 3 | Staines Town | 30 | 18 | 7 | 5 | 100 | 50 | 2.000 | 43 | Transferred to the Spartan League |
| 4 | Abingdon Town | 30 | 18 | 4 | 8 | 73 | 46 | 1.587 | 40 | |
| 5 | Stokenchurch | 30 | 15 | 6 | 9 | 72 | 62 | 1.161 | 36 | |
| 6 | Luton Town Colts | 30 | 13 | 4 | 13 | 80 | 65 | 1.231 | 30 | |
| 7 | Wantage Town | 30 | 12 | 4 | 14 | 68 | 67 | 1.015 | 28 | |
| 8 | Kidlington | 30 | 13 | 2 | 15 | 84 | 105 | 0.800 | 28 | |
| 9 | Headington United 'A' | 30 | 11 | 5 | 14 | 82 | 81 | 1.012 | 27 | |
| 10 | Pressed Steel | 30 | 11 | 5 | 14 | 56 | 78 | 0.718 | 27 | |
| 11 | Bicester Town | 30 | 11 | 3 | 16 | 73 | 85 | 0.859 | 25 | |
| 12 | Newbury Town reserves | 30 | 10 | 4 | 16 | 77 | 94 | 0.819 | 24 | |
| 13 | Chipping Norton Town | 30 | 10 | 4 | 16 | 58 | 87 | 0.667 | 24 | |
| 14 | Amersham Town | 30 | 8 | 6 | 16 | 70 | 94 | 0.745 | 22 | |
| 15 | Wallingford Town | 30 | 5 | 9 | 16 | 52 | 83 | 0.627 | 19 | |
| 16 | Bletchley Town | 30 | 8 | 2 | 20 | 47 | 110 | 0.427 | 18 | |

Source: nonleaguematters
Rules for classification: 1) points; 2) goal ratio; 3) number of goals scored.

== Division One ==
Hellenic Football League Division One
- Season: 1957–58
- Champions: Aylesbury Town Corinthians
- Matches: 182
- Goals: 1,038 (5.7 per match)

The Division One featured 8 clubs which competed in the division last season, along with 6 new clubs:

- Aston Clinton
- Hanwell Corinthians
- Hazells
- Henley Town
- Pressed Steel Reserves
- Stanwell District

=== League table ===
| Pos | Team | Pld | W | D | L | GF | GA | GR | Pts | Promotion or relegation |
|---|---|---|---|---|---|---|---|---|---|---|
| 1 | Aylesbury Town Corinthians | 26 | 22 | 2 | 2 | 123 | 35 | 3.514 | 46 | Resigned from the league |
| 2 | Stanwell District | 26 | 19 | 3 | 4 | 95 | 52 | 1.827 | 41 | |
| 3 | Hanwell Corinthians | 26 | 17 | 3 | 6 | 100 | 41 | 2.439 | 37 | |
| 4 | Thatcham | 26 | 15 | 4 | 7 | 73 | 48 | 1.521 | 34 | |
| 5 | Aston Clinton | 26 | 15 | 4 | 7 | 101 | 67 | 1.507 | 34 | |
| 6 | Hazells | 26 | 14 | 3 | 9 | 82 | 56 | 1.464 | 31 | |
| 7 | Staines Town Reserves | 26 | 10 | 3 | 13 | 62 | 73 | 0.849 | 23 | Resigned from the league |
| 8 | Henley Town | 26 | 9 | 5 | 12 | 63 | 79 | 0.797 | 23 | |
| 9 | Ruislip Town | 26 | 9 | 4 | 13 | 71 | 76 | 0.934 | 22 | |
| 10 | R A F Halton | 26 | 10 | 1 | 15 | 70 | 98 | 0.714 | 21 | |
| 11 | Stokenchurch Reserves | 26 | 7 | 2 | 17 | 59 | 99 | 0.596 | 16 | Resigned from the league |
| 12 | Princes Risborough Town | 26 | 6 | 3 | 17 | 51 | 87 | 0.586 | 15 | |
| 13 | Pressed Steel Reserves | 26 | 5 | 2 | 19 | 34 | 98 | 0.347 | 12 | |
| 14 | Amersham Town Reserves | 26 | 4 | 1 | 21 | 54 | 129 | 0.419 | 9 | |

Source: nonleaguematters
Rules for classification: 1) points; 2) goal ratio; 3) number of goals scored.
