= Worthing F.C. =

Association football club in England

Worthing
- Full name: Worthing Football Club
- Nicknames: The Rebels, The Mackerel Men
- Founded: 1886
- Ground: Woodside Road, Worthing
- Coordinates: 50.8203°N 0.3848°W
- Owner: George Dowell
- Chairman: Barry Hunter
- Manager: Adam Hinshelwood
- League: National League
- 2025–26: National League South, 1st of 24 (promoted)
- Website: worthingfc.com
Home colours	Away colours

Worthing Football Club is a professional football club based in Worthing, West Sussex, England. They are currently members of the National League and play at Woodside Road.

== History ==
The club was established in 1886 as Worthing Association Football Club. After playing friendlies, their first competitive game was a Sussex Senior Challenge Cup match on 27 November 1886 in which they defeated Brighton Hornets 1–0 at home. In 1892–93 they won the Sussex Senior Challenge Cup, beating Eastbourne 2–1 in the final. The club were founder members of the West Sussex League in 1896, and won the league in 1898–99. In the 1899–1900 season the club dropped "Association" from their name, and in May 1900 absorbed Worthing Athletic. The club were West Sussex League champions and Sussex Senior Challenge Cup winners again in 1903–04, also going onto win the Sussex RUR Cup, a competition played between the winners of the West Sussex League and East Sussex League, beating Hastings & St Leonards 3–2 in the final. Although they left the league at the end of the season due to Worthing Rovers joining, they rejoined a year later after absorbing Rovers. The club won back-to-back West Sussex League titles and RUR cups in 1906–07 and 1907–08 (also winning the Sussex Senior Challenge Cup in the latter season), and did the double again in 1909–10. They won the league title in 1912–13, and both the league and RUR Cup in 1913–14.

After World War I Worthing rejoined the West Sussex League for the 1919–20 season and also entered a team into the Brighton, Hove & District League. In 1920 they were founder members of the Sussex County League, and were the league's inaugural champions. The club retained the league title the following season, and applied to join the Athenian League, but subsequently withdrew the application. Remaining in the Sussex County League, they went on to win the league title again in 1926–27, 1928–29, 1930–31 and 1933–34. In 1936–37 the club reached the first round proper of the FA Cup for the first time, losing 4–3 at Yeovil & Petters United. The club were Sussex County League champions again in 1938–39, and after World War II, won the Western Division of the league in 1945–46.

In 1948 Worthing joined the Corinthian League. The higher level proved more challenging than the county league and they finished bottom of the Corinthian League in 1956–57, 1957–58 and 1958–59. When the league folded in 1963, Worthing and most other clubs joined Division One of the Athenian League. They were runners-up in their first season in the division, earning promotion to the Premier Division, as well as winning the AFA Invitation Cup with a 3–1 win over Harwich & Parkeston. They remained in the Premier Division until relegation at the end of the 1966–67 season, and went on to be relegated from Division One to Division Two the season after. In 1971–72 the club were Division Two runners-up, earning promotion back to Division One.

Worthing transferred to Division Two of the Isthmian League in 1977. They were Division Two champions in 1981–82, resulting in promotion to Division One. The following season the club reached the FA Cup first round again, beating Dartford 2–1 before losing 4–0 at Oxford United in the second round. The league season ended with the club winning the Division One title, earning promotion to the Premier Division. They went on to finish as runners-up in the Premier Division in both 1983–84 and 1984–85. However, the club were relegated back to Division One at the end of the 1986–87 season, and then to Division Two after finishing bottom of Division One in 1991–92. They were Division Two champions in 1992–93 and were promoted back to Division One. In 1994–95, another FA Cup first round appearance ended with a 3–1 defeat at AFC Bournemouth. They went on to finish the season as runners-up in Division One and were promoted to the Premier Division, but were relegated back to Division One after finishing bottom of the Premier Division the following season.

In 1999–2000 Worthing reached the FA Cup first round again, losing 3–0 at Rotherham United. League reorganisation saw them placed in Division One South in 2002. They were runners-up in the division in 2003–04 and were promoted to the Premier Division. However, after finishing third-from-bottom of the Premier Division in 2006–07 the club were relegated back to Division One South. A fifth-place finish in 2007–08 saw them qualify for the promotion play-offs, in which they were defeated 2–0 by Tooting & Mitcham United in the semi-finals. Another fifth-place finish the following season was followed by a 1–0 play-off semi-final defeat to Cray Wanderers. The club finished third in Division One South in 2009–10, but again failed to advance past the play-off semi-finals, losing 2–1 to Godalming Town.

In 2015–16 Worthing finished third in Division One South again. After beating Hythe Town 7–0 in the play-off semi-finals, they secured promotion to the Premier Division with a 3–0 win over Faversham Town in the final. The club were top of the Premier Division table when the COVID-19 pandemic halted both the 2019–20 and 2020–21 seasons, but they went on to become Premier Division champions in 2021–22, earning promotion to the National League South. In their first season in the National League the club finished fourth in the division, qualifying for the play-offs. After beating Braintree Town 2–1 in the quarter-finals, they lost 2–0 to Oxford City in the semi-finals. The season also saw them win the Sussex Senior Cup again, beating Bognor Regis Town 8–7 on penalties after a 0–0 draw. At the start of the 2023–24 season the club won the Sussex Community Shield, defeating Broadbridge Heath 5–4 on penalties after the match ended 3–3. They went on to reach the first round of the FA Cup for the fifth time, losing 2–0 at Alfreton Town, and finished third in the National League South, qualifying for the play-offs again. After beating Maidstone United 2–1 in the semi-finals, the club lost 4–3 to Braintree Town in the final.

The 2025–26 season saw Worthing win the National League South title, earning promotion to the National League. In 2026 the club was awarded the Freedom of the Borough by Worthing Borough Council for this achievement.

== Ground ==
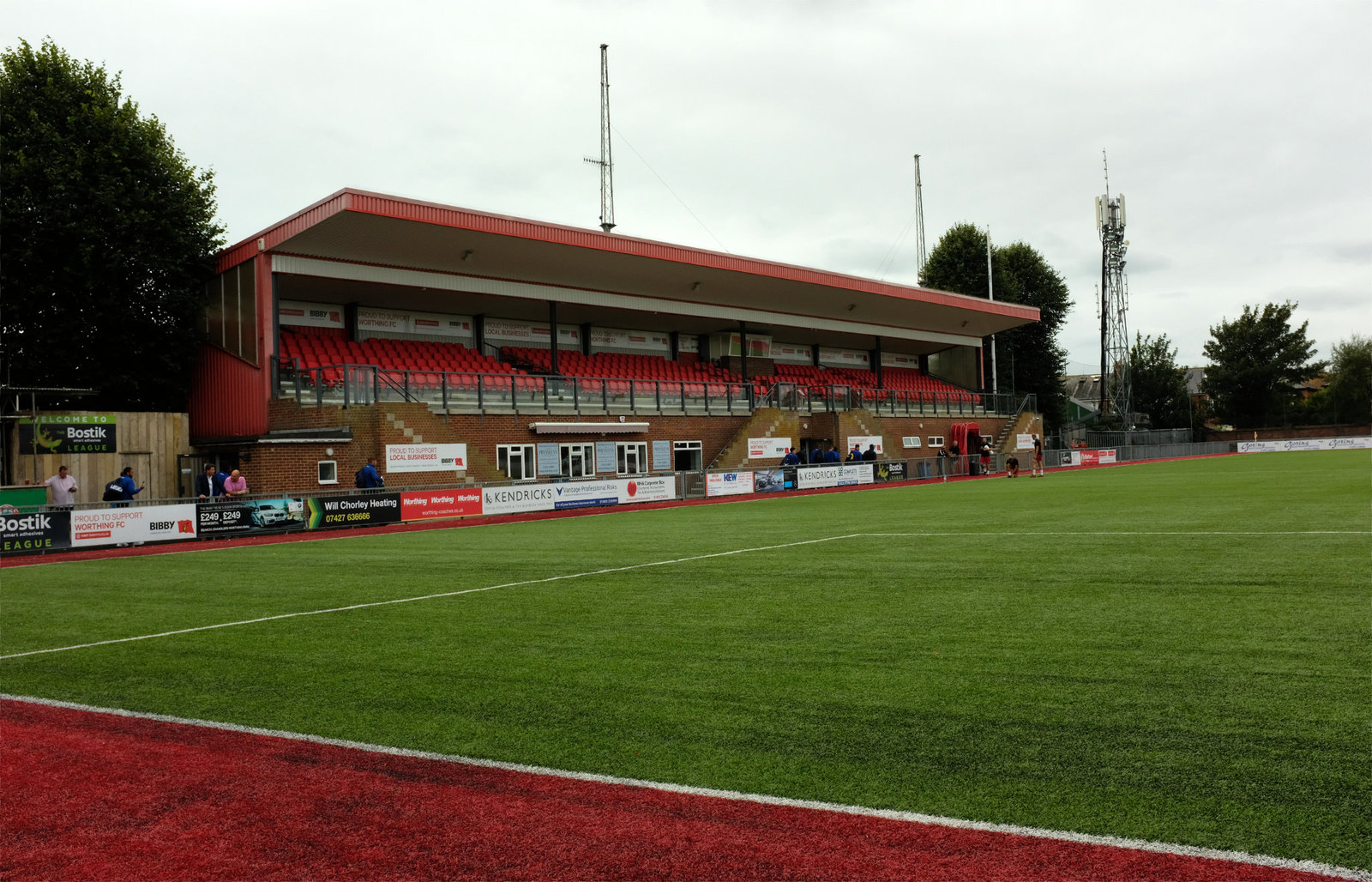
Woodside Road, 2018

The club initially played at People's Party (now Homefield Park), before moving to Beach House Park in 1889. In 1901 they relocated to the Sports Ground, which later became known as Woodside Road. A sports ground had been opened on the Woodside Road site as early as 1892, when the site was part of the parish of West Tarring (which at the time was not yet part of the borough of Worthing). Then known as the Pavilion Road Sports Ground, it occupied a 13-acre site, with a Queen Anne-style pavilion giving its name to Pavilion Road along the south of the site. The land was donated by a local benefactor, Mr Brazier. A record attendance of 3,100 was set for an FA Amateur Cup quarter-final replay against Depot Battalion, RE in 1907–08. A new record of 3,600 was set for an FA Cup fourth qualifying round match against Wimbledon in 1936.

In 1937 the Sports Ground closed and the site's northern portion was developed into the existing Woodside Road ground. The southern portion of the Sports Ground became tennis courts and then in 1948 became home to Worthing Pavilion Bowls Club. Floodlights were installed in 1977. At the end of 1984–85 Woodside Road's main stand, which had been in place since the 1920s, burnt down. A replacement was opened in 1986. In 2015, former player George Dowell took over the club, after receiving compensation following an accident that ended his career. That same year, an artificial pitch was installed. This surface initially proved troublesome and had to be fully re-installed in 2021.

During the 2023–24 season a new West Stand was built with a capacity of around 750. This stand is nicknamed by fans ‘The Chris Biggs Stand’ after a gentleman by the same name won a lottery to cut the ribbon, opening the new stand.

This was followed by the construction of a 1,800-capacity North Stand in 2024. The club's record attendance of 4,002 was set on the final day of the 2025–26 season when for a title-deciding match against Ebbsfleet United.

The ground has also been home to Horsham (during the 2008–09 season) and Brighton & Hove Albion's reserve team after the closure of the Goldstone Ground in 1997.

== Current squad ==
As of 16 October 2026

Note: Flags indicate national team as defined under FIFA eligibility rules; some limited exceptions apply. Players may hold more than one non-FIFA nationality.

No.	Pos.	Nation	Player
1	GK	ENG	Harrison Foulkes
2	DF	ENG	Joel Colbran (captain)
3	DF	GHA	Cory Adjetey-Brew (on loan from Queens Park Rangers)
4	MF	ENG	Jack Wadham
5	DF	ENG	Joe Cook
7	FW	ENG	Razzaq Coleman De-Graft
8	MF	AFG	Noor Husin
9	FW	ENG	Dominic Johnson-Fisher
10	FW	TCA	Dominic Hutchinson
11	FW	ANT	Ashley Nathaniel-George
12	DF	ENG	Harry Ransom
13	GK	ENG	Taylor Seymour
14	MF	ENG	Harvey Griffiths
15	MF	ENG	Ricky Aguiar

No.	Pos.	Nation	Player
16	MF	ENG	Sam Packham
17	FW	ENG	Bailey Smith
21	FW	ENG	Emmerson Sutton (on loan from Queens Park Rangers)
22	MF	ENG	Tyrique Clarke
23	FW	IRL	Daniel Isichei
24	FW	ENG	Charley Kendall
25	MF	IRL	Harvey Boddy (on loan from Queens Park Rangers)
27	FW	SCO	Jordan Young
28	DF	ENG	Charlie Waller (on loan from Milton Keynes Dons)
29	DF	ENG	Freddie Kokot
30	DF	ENG	Callum Beck
31	MF	ENG	Fin Smith
32	GK	ENG	Guillermo De La Cruz
33	GK	IRL	Reuben Egan (dual-registered with Basingstoke Town)

=== Out on loan ===
Note: Flags indicate national team as defined under FIFA eligibility rules; some limited exceptions apply. Players may hold more than one non-FIFA nationality.

No.	Pos.	Nation	Player
18	MF	ENG	Owen Spicer (at Three Bridges until 10 November 2026)
19	FW	ENG	Ollie Godziemski (at AFC Totton until January 2027)

No.	Pos.	Nation	Player
20	MF	ENG	Matt Burgess (at Chichester City until 16 November 2026)

== Managerial history ==
Dates	Name
1981–1986	(England) Barry Lloyd
1986–1987	(England) Keith Rowley
1987–1988	(England) Alan Pook
1988–1989	(England) J.Rains
1989–1991	(England) Keith Rowley
1991–1994	(Northern Ireland) Gerry Armstrong
1994–1996	(England) John Robson
1996	(England) Mark Falco
1996–2001	(England) Brian Donnelly
2001–2003	(England) Barry Lloyd
2003–2009	(England) Alan Pook
2009–2010	(England) Simon Colbran
2010–2012	(England) Chris White
2012–2013	(England) Lee Brace
2013–2015	(England) Adam Hinshelwood
2015–2017	(England) Gary Elphick
2017–2024	(England) Adam Hinshelwood
2024	(England) Aarran Racine
2024–2025	(England) Chris Agutter
2025-present	(England) Adam Hinshelwood

== Honours ==
- National League
  - National League South champions 2025–26
- Isthmian League
  - Premier Division champions 2021–22
  - Division One champions 1982–83
  - Division Two champions 1981–82, 1992–93
- Sussex County League
  - Champions 1920–21, 1921–22, 1926–27, 1928–29, 1930–31, 1933–34, 1938–39
  - Western Division champions 1945–46
- West Sussex League
  - Champions 1898–99, 1903–04, 1906–07, 1907–08, 1909–10, 1912–13, 1913–14
- Sussex Senior Challenge Cup
  - Winners 1892–93, 1903–04, 1907–08, 1913–14, 1919–20, 1922–23, 1926–27, 1928–29, 1934–35, 1939–40, 1944–45, 1945–46, 1946–47, 1951–52, 1956–57, 1958–59, 1960–61, 1970–75, 1976–77, 1977–78, 1998–99, 2022–23
- Sussex RUR Cup
  - Winners 1903–04, 1906–07, 1907–08, 1909–10, 1913–14, 1920–21, 1926–27, 1933–34 (shared), 1939–40, 1941–42, 1944–45, 1948–49 (shared), 1952–53, 1953–54
- Sussex Floodlit Cup
  - Winners 1988–89, 1989–90, 1997–98
- AFA Invitation Cup
  - Winners 1963–64
- Sussex Community Shield
  - Winners 2023–24

== Records ==
- Best FA Cup performance: Second round, 1982–83
- Best FA Amateur Cup performance: Quarter-finals, 1907–08
- Best FA Trophy performance: Fifth round, 2024–25
- Best FA Vase performance: Fifth round, 1978–79
- Record attendance: 4,002 vs Ebbsfleet United, National League South, 25 April 2026
- Biggest victory: 25–0 vs Littlehampton, Sussex League, 1911–12
- Heaviest defeat: 0–14 vs Southwick, Sussex County League, 1946–47
- Most appearances: Mark Knee, 414
- Most goals: Mick Edmonds, 276

== See also ==
- Worthing F.C. players
- Worthing F.C. managers
- Sport in Worthing
