= Corinthian League (football) =

English amateur football league

- Founded: 1945
- First season: 1945–46
- Folded: 1963
- Country: England
- Divisions: One
- Number of clubs: Lowest: 9 (1945–1946); Highest: 16 (1959–1963)
- Feeder to: Athenian League
- Domestic cup(s): FA Cup, FA Amateur Cup
- Most championships: Hounslow Town (3); Maidenhead United (3); Walton & Hersham (3)

The Corinthian League was an English amateur football league in and around London. Formed in 1945 on the resumption of football after World War II, the league began with nine member clubs. In 1963 the league was disbanded and most clubs joined the newly formed Division One of the Athenian League.

== List of champions ==
Season	Champions
1945–46	Grays Athletic
1946–47	Walton & Hersham
1947–48	Walton & Hersham
1948–49	Walton & Hersham
1949–50	Hounslow Town
1950–51	Slough Town
1951–52	Hounslow Town
1952–53	Carshalton Athletic
1953–54	Carshalton Athletic
1954–55	Hounslow Town
1955–56	Maidstone United
1956–57	Yiewsley
1957–58	Maidenhead United
1958–59	Dagenham
1959–60	Uxbridge
1960–61	Maidenhead United
1961–62	Maidenhead United
1962–63	Leatherhead

== Member clubs ==
Twenty-nine clubs played in the league during its existence:

- Bedford Avenue
- Carshalton Athletic
- Chesham United
- Dagenham
- Dorking
- Eastbourne
- Edgware Town
- Epsom & Ewell
- Epsom Town
- Erith & Belvedere
- Grays Athletic
- Hastings & St Leonards
- Horsham
- Hounslow Town
- Leatherhead
- Letchworth Town
- London Fire Forces
- Maidenhead United
- Maidstone United
- Slough Town
- Tilbury
- Twickenham
- Uxbridge
- Walton & Hersham
- Wembley
- Windsor & Eton
- Wokingham Town
- Worthing
- Yiewsley

== See also ==
- List of Corinthian League (football) seasons
