= Hounslow F.C. =

Hounslow
- Full name: Hounslow Football Club
- Dissolved: 1991
- Ground: Denbigh Road, Hounslow
- 1990–91: Hellenic League Premier Division, 9/18

Hounslow F.C. was an English football club based in Hounslow, Greater London.

== History ==
A Hounslow F.C. existed in the early part of the twentieth century, and spent the 1899–1900 in the London League. The modern club were originally named Hounslow Town and joined the Corinthian League in 1946. They were league champions in 1949–50 and 1951–52. They were champions again in 1954–55 and also reached the first round of the FA Cup, where they lost 4–2 at home to Hastings United.

At the end of the season they joined the Athenian League. The club finished as runners-up in their first season in the Athenian League and were champions in 1959–60. In 1961–62 the club reached the final of the FA Amateur Cup. After a 1–1 draw with Crook Town at Wembley, they lost the replay at Ayresome Park 4–0. The following season they were given direct entry to the first round of the FA Cup, holding Mansfield Town to a 3–3 draw at home, before losing 9–2 away. In 1966 the club was renamed Hounslow.

In 1968–69 the club finished bottom of the Premier Division of the Athenian League and were relegated to Division One. They went on to finish bottom of Division One in both 1970–71 and 1971–72, but remained in the league until 1977, when they joined Division One South of the Southern League. After finishing bottom of the Southern Division in 1983–84 the club was relegated to the Premier Division of the Hellenic League. They were runners-up in 1986–87 the club were promoted back to the Southern League. However, they were relegated again in 1989–90 and returned to the Hellenic League.

In 1991 the club lost its Denbigh Road ground to the council, which built a school on the site. They then merged with Feltham to form Feltham & Hounslow Borough, with the new club playing in the Isthmian League. However, the merged club reverted to the name Feltham in 1995.

== Honours ==
- Athenian League
  - Champions: 1959–60
- Corinthian League
  - Champions: 1949–50, 1951–52, 1954–55
- Middlesex Senior Cup
  - Winners: 1955–56, 1960–61
- Middlesex Senior Charity Cup
  - Winners: 1952–53, 1955–56, 1959–60, 1961–62, 1965–66

== Former players ==
1. Players that have played/managed in the Football League or any foreign equivalent to this level (i.e. fully professional league).
2. Players with full international caps.
3. Players that hold a club record or have captained the club.

- (England) Fred Bullock
- (England) Percy Gleeson
- (England) Warren Gravette
- (England) David Silman
- (Scotland) Robert Burns
