= Dagenham F.C. =

Dagenham
- Full name: Dagenham Football Club
- Founded: 1949
- Dissolved: 1992; 34 years ago
- Ground: Victoria Road, Dagenham
- League: Isthmian League Premier Division
- 1991–92: Isthmian League Premier Division, 9th of 22
Home colours

Dagenham Football Club was an English football club based in Dagenham. Established in 1949, the club played at Victoria Road from 1955 until its merger with Redbridge Forest in 1992 to form Dagenham & Redbridge.

== History ==
Established in 1949, the club were founder members of the Metropolitan & District League in the 1949–50 season, finishing as runners-up after losing the title on goal average. They won the title the following season before becoming founder members of the Delphian League for the 1951–52 season, finishing as runners-up in the inaugural season. In 1952–53 they won the title. This was followed by two consecutive second-place finishes, before back-to-back titles were won in 1955–56 and 1956–57.

In 1957 the club switched to the Corinthian League, winning the title in their second season in the league. In 1963 they joined the Premier Division of the Athenian League. In both 1969–70 and 1970–71 they reached the final of the FA Amateur Cup, but lost on both occasions, although they did win the league in the latter season.

In 1973 the club became founder members of the new Division Two of the Isthmian League, which they won at the first attempt, earning promotion to Division One. In 1976–77 they reached the final of the FA Trophy, but lost 2–1 to Scarborough. Three years later they reached the final again, this time defeating Mossley 2–1.

In 1981 the club were admitted to the Alliance Premier League, where they remained until finishing bottom in 1987–88, when they were relegated back to the Isthmian League.

== Colours ==
The club's traditional colours were red shirts and white shorts; its final colours were all red.

== Honours ==
- FA Trophy
  - Winners: 1980
- Isthmian League
  - Division Two champions: 1973–74
- Athenian League
  - Champions: 1970–71
- Corinthian League
  - Champions: 1958–59
- Delphian League
  - Champions: 1952–53, 1955–56, 1956–57
- London Senior Cup
  - Champions: 1967–68
- Isthmian League Cup
  - Champions: 1977–78

== Records ==
- Highest league position: Fifth in the Alliance Premier League, 1981–82
- Best FA Cup performance: Third Round in 1984–85
- Best FA Amateur Cup performance: Runners-up in 1969–70 and 1970–71
- Best FA Trophy performance: Winners in 1979–80

== Former players ==
Ian Huntley goalkeeper
