= Windsor & Eton F.C. (1892) =

Coordinates: 51°28′10″N 0°37′22″W

Windsor & Eton
- Full name: Windsor & Eton Football Club
- Nickname: The Royalists
- Founded: 1892; 133 years ago
- Dissolved: February 2, 2011; 14 years ago
- Ground: Stag Meadow, Windsor
- Capacity: 4,500 (450 seated)
- 2010–11: Southern League Premier Division, resigned
Home colours	Away colours

Windsor & Eton F.C. was an English association football club based in Windsor, Berkshire, last playing in the Southern League Premier Division in 2010–11, until it was wound up on 2 February 2011 due to large debts. A new club, Windsor F.C., was formed to compete from the 2011–12 season onwards. In 2023, a new Windsor & Eton was formed, based at Stag Meadow, the lease of the ground was awarded to Windsor & Eton Football Club & as a result Windsor FC were forced to move to Beaconsfield.

== History ==
Windsor & Eton F.C. was formed on 18 August 1892 by a merger of Windsor Phoenix and Windsor St. Albans. They began in the Southern Alliance (which included teams like Tottenham), and in 1893 they merged with Windsor Victoria and entered the first FA Amateur Cup. A decline in fortunes saw them withdraw from the Berks & Bucks Senior League in 1901 before a ball had been kicked. In 1902 Windsor & Eton Temperance F.C. was the subject of a take over, with the name being shortened to the title now used.

Prince Christian was connected with the club in this era, and patrons of the club included Kings George V, George VI, and the Duke of Edinburgh, hence the club's nickname of "The Royalists".

Over the years the club has competed in the Southern League (1895–96), West Berks League (1903–04), Great Western Suburban League (1904–22), Athenian League (1922–29), Spartan League (1929–39), Great Western Combination (1939–45), Corinthian League (1945–50), Metropolitan League (1950–60), Delphian League (1960–63), then the Athenian League again (1963–81), until joining the Isthmian League in 1981. During this time Windsor won County Cup five consecutive seasons (1941–45), which, until recent times was an English record. In 1922 they recorded their best ever Amateur Cup run, reaching the 4th round Proper, and in 1925 reached the 2nd round Proper of the FA Cup, losing 2–5 to Charlton Athletic at the Valley.

Without doubt the best period in Windsor's history was the 1980s. Under manager Brian Caterer, they started the decade by winning the Athenian League and reaching the last four in the FA Vase (just one year after losing in the quarter-final). The league title was retained in 1981, when they were also League Cup finalists and reached the 1st round Proper in the FA Cup. Then came promotion to the Isthmian League Division Two, where they finished 5th in their first season. Promotion came the following season after finishing 2nd. The following season the Division One Championship was won, along with another appearance in the FA Cup 1st round Proper.

Their first campaign in the Premier Division saw them finish 5th as well as a draw at home against AFC Bournemouth in the second round of the FA Cup. Windsor eventually lost the replay with both sides already knowing that the winners would have a home tie against Manchester United in the next round. Since then they have had four further appearances in the 1st round Proper of the FA Cup, and three appearances in the Berks & Bucks Senior Cup final, winning in 1988 and 1989.

The 1990s started with Windsor celebrating their centenary in 1991/92. They suffered a poor following season and their 9-year spell in the Premier Division came to an end when they finished second from bottom and were relegated to Division One. 1993/94 saw them finish 21st again, to be relegated to Division Two and although they improved their position by one place the following season, it still wasn't enough to avoid the dubious honour for the third season running in 1994/95.

Season 1995/96 saw a revival in the club's fortune when they finished third in Division Three and were the Isthmian League's leading scorers with 117 goals. Season 2000–01 saw a complete overhaul of the club and the changes were vindicated when the club achieved promotion to Division One by finishing runners-up.

In November 2001, following a poor start to their Division One campaign, which wasn't helped by a horrendous early-season injury list, the Royalists finished in bottom place, although a league restructure meant relegation was never a worry.

Season 2002–03 saw some more experienced faces added to the squad during the course of the season and the club enjoyed its best FA Trophy run for years beating Welling United, Hitchin Town and Vauxhall Motors before bowing out on penalties to Aylesbury United. Two years later a re-organisation of the English football league system saw them moved into the Premier Division, where they remained until another re-organisation saw them moved into the Southern League in 2006.

In July 2006, Simon Lane was installed as the new manager. After rebuilding the squad from scratch, Lane guided the club into 14th place by the end of the 2006–07 season

In 2009 Windsor & Eton FC won the Berks & Bucks Senior Cup, beating Marlow FC 1–0 in the final.

At the end of the 2009–10 season the Royalists finished top of the Southern League Division One South and West, one point ahead of AFC Totton, thus securing automatic promotion as champions. Mounting debts meant numerous hearings in court for the club through 2010, and on 30 January 2011 the club made an official statement effectively saying that the club would cease to exist after the high court hearing on 2 February, but that they hoped to start a new club, playing at the same ground.

=== New clubs formed ===
Windsor F.C. was formed on 2 February 2011 by fans of the original Windsor & Eton club and accepted into the Combined Counties League Division 1.

Windsor & Eton was formed in May 2023 by Mark Cooper, based at Stag Meadow, after the 2011 Windsor F.C. moved to play at Holloways Park, Beaconsfield until they themselves were dissolved on 23 July 2025.

== Ground ==
Early grounds at which the club played were Windsor Recreation Ground and Balloon Meadow (now part of Windsor Racecourse) before the move to the present ground at Stag Meadow in 1911.

In 2003 the Isthmian League awarded the ground an 'A' grade following some frenetic building activity which saw terracing completed all the way around the ground, plus a new turnstile block and an extension to the covered terracing on the far side of the ground.

Following the successful 09–10 season a team of supporters and club members turned out prepare the ground for football in the Southern Premier Division. The summer was spent roofing, weeding, painting, carpeting and completing odd jobs all around the ground to give it the face lift it required. As well work taking place to prepare the playing surface of the pitch.

== Notable players ==
Two players who turned out for Windsor during the inter-war years were Vic Woodley, who later distinguished himself in goal for Chelsea, Derby County and England, and Billy Coward, who joined QPR before moving to Walsall and playing in the famous 'giant-killing' side which beat the mighty Arsenal in the FA Cup in 1933.

More recently, Morgaro Gomis, Solomon Taiwo and Gavin Tomlin played for the club.

Keith Scott played for the club and also managed the club taking them on to win the Berks and Bucks County FA cup in 08-09 and then on to win the league in 09–10.

Actor Ralf Little turned out for the club on several occasion in the 05–06 season.

AFC Wimbledon goal keeper Seb Brown played for Windsor in the 07–08 season whilst on loan from Brentford FC.

Jermaine Gumbs – Anguillan international footballer in 2008–09 season.

Blackburn Rovers all-time leading goalscorer Simon Garner played a number of games for the club in 1999.

== Mascot ==
Windsor and Eton FC's mascot was Scotty the Stag. Scotty made his debut at Stag Meadow on 12 December 2009 during the 6–0 thrashing of Bracknell Town FC. Scotty helped raise money for charity and visited children at Wexham Park Hospital. Scotty also took part in two mascot races during the 2010–11 season.

== Sources ==
- Windsor & Eton at the Football Club History Database
