= Briggs Sports F.C. =

Briggs Sports
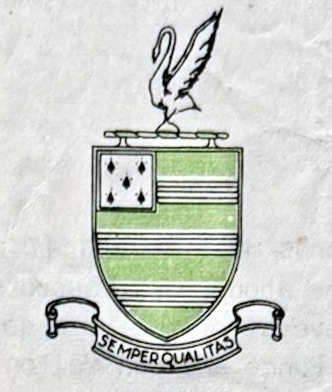
- Full name: Briggs Sports Football Club
- Founded: 1934
- Dissolved: 1959
- Ground: Rush Green, Romford
Home colours

Briggs Sports Football Club was an English amateur association football club based in Dagenham, Essex (now part of Greater London).

== History ==
Founded in 1934 at Briggs Motor Bodies Limited as Briggs Motor Bodies F.C., the club participated in the London League and the Spartan League, and reached the semi-final of the FA Amateur Cup in 1954.

The club took over Victoria Road (now home to Dagenham & Redbridge) after Sterling Athletic vacated the ground. They came into prominence when they joined the London League in 1935, winning Division 1 in 1936–7 and 1938–9. They won the Essex Senior Cup in 1939/40 beating Leyton 2–0 at their Hare & Hounds Ground. After the War they entered the Spartan League with their reserves playing in Division 1 of the London League. They recovered from a bad start and won the Spartan League in 1949–50, and then set up an enviable record winning the title in 1951–2, 1955–6, 1956–7, 1957–8 and 1958–9. In addition, they won the London Senior Cup in 1955–6 and 1956–7, together with the Essex Senior Cup in 1950, 1951 and 1952. Their efforts culminated with the club reaching the semi-final of the FA Amateur Cup played at St James' Park, Newcastle on 13 March 1954 in which they were defeated by Bishop Auckland. The match was watched by an attendance of 54,000. In the fourth round, they beat the renowned Oxford & Cambridge side Pegasus 3–0 at Victoria Road before an Attendance of 6,500.

Briggs played at Victoria Road until 1955. Their final home match was played on 30 April 1955.

=== Rush Green ===
The new ground at Rush Green was opened on 14 May 1955 when a Combined Area XI played West Ham United in front of an estimated crowd of 10,000. In June 1959, the fortunes of Ford Sports F.C. were fading and as Briggs Motor Bodies had been absorbed by the Ford Motor Company, a decision was made to amalgamate the two clubs with a new name of Ford United and so from season 1959–60 the name of Briggs Sports disappeared from the map. Ford United continued playing at Rush Green but with little success. Ford ultimately withdrew their sponsorship and refused to grant a five-year lease, which the Isthmian League required, and so the 2000–2001 season was their last at the ground. They moved to Barkingside and subsequently changed their name to Redbridge.

Romford played six seasons at the ground but in 2008 the site was sold to West Ham United for use as a training ground.

Grays Athletic played one season at the ground in 2012–13 when they finished Champions of the Isthmian League Division 1 North, but were refused permission to continue their stay as West Ham United had completed their alterations to the complex and it was required by the academy.

== Colours ==
The club's colours were green and white. In the 1950s the schema was green shirts with white sleeves, white shorts, and green and white socks.

== Honours ==
=== League ===
- London League: 1937, 1939
- Spartan League

Premier Division: 1950
East Division 1: 1947

=== Cup ===
- Essex Senior Cup 1940, 1950, 1951, 1952
- Spartan League Cup: 1957, 1958, 1959
- London Senior Cup: 1955–56, 1956–57
