= Wolverton A.F.C. =

Wolverton
- Full name: Wolverton Association Football Club
- Nicknames: The Wolves, MK Wolves, The Railwaymen
- Founded: 1887
- Dissolved: 1992
- Ground: Wolverton Park
- Chairman: George Dicks
- Manager: Derek Steadman
Home colours	Away colours

Wolverton Association Football Club, often known simply as Wolverton, was an English football team representing the town of Wolverton (and, for a time, Milton Keynes). The club's motto was "In Omnia Paratus" (lit: "In all things prepared").

== History ==
The club was founded in 1887. It joined the Southern Football League in 1895, and left after a rollercoaster five seasons in which the club was promoted and relegated between the two divisions twice.

The club mostly played in the United Counties League (originally the Northampton League) on and off between 1902 and 1982, briefly playing in the Athenian League, Isthmian League, and finally the South Midlands League.

The club folded in January 1992; although the finances were in a poor state, the task of running the club had become too much for the final committee members, and after club secretary Paul Mumford resigned because of work commitments, the remaining members resolved to wind up the club.

== Colours ==
The club originally played in light and dark blue. By 1948 the club wore royal blue shirts with three white hoops and black shorts, and the old gold shirts and black shorts in 1949, but had to use maroon and amber shirts temporarily in 1949 because of a lack of supply. It retained gold and black until dissolution.

== Ground ==
Until 2007, its former home ground, Wolverton Park had what was believed to be the oldest football stand in the United Kingdom. The ground and immediate area has since been redeveloped into a housing area, Wolverton Park housing development. In November 2012, the football stand structure is still in place, but it has been stripped to act as an ornamental feature on the edge of the community park which has been built on top of the old football pitch.

== Club names ==
The club has had a number of different names during its history, and at one time held the record for the longest club name in English football: "Newport Pagnell & Wolverton London & North Western Railway Amalgamated Association Football Club".

1887–1888	Wolverton
1888–1889	Wolverton London & North Western Railway
1889–1890	Newport Pagnell & Wolverton London & North Western Railway
1890–1902	Wolverton London & North Western Railway
1902–1948	Wolverton Town
1948–1981	Wolverton Town & B.R. [British Railways]
1981–1987	Wolverton Town
1987–1988	Wolverton Town (Milton Keynes)
1988–1990	Milton Keynes Wolverton Town (aka Milton Keynes Wolves)
1990–1992	Wolverton

== Achievements ==
- Berks & Bucks Senior Cup:
  - Winners (1): 1892/93
  - Runners-up (4): 1888/89, 1891/92, 1895/96, 1969/70
- Berks & Bucks Benevolent Cup:
  - Winners (2): 1947/48, 1949/50
- Berks & Bucks Junior Cup:
  - Winners (1): 1904/05
- FA Cup:
  - 4th Qualifying Round (1): 1957/58
- FA Vase:
  - 3rd Round (4): 1974/75, 1975/76, 1976/77, 1977/78
- Southern Football League:
  - Division 2 Champions (1): 1895–96
  - Division 2 (London Section) Runners-up (1): 1898–99
- Isthmian League:
  - Division 2 North Runners-up (1): 1986/87
- South Midlands League:
  - Premier Division Champions (2): 1938/39, 1945/46
  - Premier Division Runners-up (1): 1990/91
- United Counties League:
  - Champions (1): 1913/14
- Spartan League:
  - Premier Division Runners-up (1): 1951/52
  - Western Division Runners-up (1): 1946/47
- Bucks & Contiguous Counties League:
  - Division 1 Runners-up (1): 1898/99
- Athenian League Cup:
  - Runners-up (1): 1983/84
- United Counties League Cup:
  - Runners-up (1): 1966–67
- Kettering & District Charity Cup:
  - Runners-up (2): 1892/93, 1893/94
- Luton & District Charity Cup:
  - Winners (1): 1926/27
  - Runners-up (1): 1893/94
- Wolverton & District Charity Cup:
  - Winners (2): 1893/94, 1894/95
  - Runners-up (2): 1895/96, 1896/97

== Notable former players ==
1. Players that have played/managed in the Football League or any foreign equivalent to this level (i.e. fully professional league).
2. Players with full international caps.
3. Players that hold a club record or have captained the club.

- (England) George Henson went on to play for Northampton Town, Bradford Park Avenue, Sheffield United, Swansea Town and Wolverhampton Wanderers between 1932 and 1939.

== See also ==
- Wolverton railway works where almost all the players worked.
- Milton Keynes City F.C., which took over Wolverton Park when Wolves went bust.
