= Metropolitan Police F.C. =

English football club

Coordinates: 51°23′25″N 0°21′6″W

Metropolitan Police
- Full name: Metropolitan Police Football Club
- Nicknames: The Met; The Old Bill; The Blues and Twos
- Founded: 1919
- Ground: Imber Court, East Molesey
- Capacity: 3,000 (297 seated)
- Chairman: Desmond Flanders
- Manager: Paul Burnell
- League: Combined Counties League Premier Division South
- 2025–26: Isthmian League South Central Division, 20th of 22 (relegated)
Home colours	Away colours

Metropolitan Police Football Club is a football club based in East Molesey, Surrey, England. Originally made up of players from the Metropolitan Police, the rule requiring players to be employees of the service was removed when the Commissioner refused to sanction time off for playing. However, the club is still part-funded by a police staff lottery. They are currently members of the Combined Counties League Premier Division South and play at Imber Court, the base of the Met Police Sports and Social Club.

== History ==
The club was established in 1919 as a team for officers and civilian staff of the Metropolitan Police. After playing friendlies for nine years and winning the Middlesex Senior Cup in 1927–28, they joined Division One East of the Spartan League in 1928, with the reserves joining Division Two East. Both teams won their division in their first season in the league. The reserves then left the league, with the first team placed in the Premier Division amidst league reorganisation, going on to win the title in the 1929–30 season. In 1931–32 they reached the first round of the FA Cup but lost 9–0 at Northampton Town. The following season saw them win the Surrey Senior Cup, beating Dulwich Hamlet 2–1 in the final. The club were FA Amateur Cup semi-finalists in 1933–34, losing 2–0 to Dulwich Hamlet. The following season saw them finish as runners-up in the Premier Division.

Metropolitan Police were Spartan League champions again in 1936–37 and 1938–39. When the league restarted after World War II, they were placed in the Central Division for the 1945–46 season, winning the title without losing a match. Placed in the Premier Division the following season, the club won the league title in 1946–47 and were runners-up in 1947–48. They won back-to-back titles in 1953–54 and 1954–55. In 1960 the club transferred to the Metropolitan League, finishing bottom of the league in 1961–62. They won the League Cup in 1968–69, and when the league folded in 1971, they transferred to Division One South of the Southern League, where they remained until moving to Division Two of the Isthmian League in 1977. They were Division Two runners-up in 1977–78, earning promotion to Division One. In 1984–85 the club reached the first round of the FA Cup, losing 3–0 at home to Dartford.

At the end of the 1984–85 season Metropolitan Police were relegated to Division Two South. Although they were promoted back to Division One after finishing as runners-up in the division in 1987–88, the club were relegated to Division Two at the end of the 1990–91 season. Another FA Cup first round appearance in 1993–94 ended in a 2–0 defeat at home to Crawley Town. Amidst league reorganisation, the club were moved into Division One South in 2002, before being placed in Division One in 2004. A fifth-placed finish in 2004–05 saw them qualify for the promotion play-offs, but they lost 4–3 on penalties to Bromley in the semi-finals after a 1–1 draw. The club finished fourth in the division the following season, but lost in the play-off semi-finals again, defeated 1–0 by Dover Athletic.

More league reorganisation saw Metropolitan Police placed in Division One South in 2006. They finished fourth in 2007–08, losing 2–0 to Cray Wanderers in the play-off semi-finals. Another fourth-placed finish in 2008–09 was followed by a 1–0 win against Fleet Town in the play-off semi-finals before a 1–0 loss to Cray Wanderers in the final. They won the London Senior Cup in 2009–10, beating AFC Wimbledon in the final on penalties. In 2010–11 the club won Division One South, earning promotion to the Premier Division. A fourth FA Cup first round appearance in 2012–13 saw the club drawn at home to Crawley Town again, this time losing 2–1. In 2014–15 they finished fifth, going on to lose 2–1 to Hendon in the play-off semi-finals. The club also won the Surrey Senior Cup, beating Merstham 2–0 in the final.

At the end of the 2017–18 season Metropolitan Police were transferred to the Premier South division of the Southern League as part of the restructuring of the non-League pyramid. The following season saw them reach the first round of the FA Cup again, losing 2–0 to Newport County. They also won the Surrey Senior Cup, and finished third in the Premier Division South. In the play-offs they defeated Salisbury 3–2 in the semi-finals, and went on to win the final against Poole Town 1–0, qualifying for the super play-off final against Tonbridge Angels, which they lost 3–2 after extra time. Despite finishing eighth in the Premier Division South in 2022–23, the club were voluntarily relegated to the South Central Division of the Isthmian League. They finished third-from-bottom of the South Central Division in 2025–26 and were relegated to the Premier Division South of the Combined Counties League.

== Ground ==
The club have played at Imber Court since their establishment. The site was purchased by the Metropolitan Police Service in 1919, with a clubhouse opened in 1920. A grandstand was opened in 1923 and doubled in size to accommodate 672 spectators in 1934. Floodlights were erected in 1971 and the ground was enclosed in 1973. Terracing was installed on three sides of the pitch in 1984, with a cover added to the Mounted Branch End in 1988. In 1994 the original stand was demolished and replaced with a 300-seat stand, which was opened with a commemorative match against the Army.

When playing at home, the players come out to the tune of "I Fought the Law" by The Clash.

== Honours ==
- Isthmian League
  - Division One South champions 2010–11
- Metropolitan League
  - League Cup winners 1968–69
- Spartan League
  - Premier Division champions 1929–30, 1936–37, 1938–39, 1946–47, 1953–54, 1954–55
  - Central Division champions 1945–46
  - Division One East champions, 1928–29
- London Senior Cup
  - Winners 2009–10
- Surrey Senior Cup
  - Winners 1932–33, 2014–15, 2018–19, 2022-23
- Middlesex Senior Cup
  - Winners 1927–28

== Records ==
- Best FA Cup performance: First round, 1931–32, 1984–85, 1993–94, 2012–13, 2018–19
- Best FA Amateur Cup performance: Semi-finals, 1933–34
- Best FA Trophy performance: Second round, 1989–90
- Best FA Vase performance: Quarter-finals, 1994–95
- Record attendance: 4,500 vs Kingstonian, FA Cup, 1934
- Biggest win: 10–1 vs Tilbury, Isthmian League Division Two, 6 May 1995
- Heaviest defeat: 11–1 vs Wimbledon, 1956
- Most appearances: Pat Robert
- Most goals: Mario Russo

== See also ==
- Metropolitan Police F.C. players
- Metropolitan Police F.C. managers
