= 2006–07 Watford F.C. season =

English football team season

Watford
2006–07 season
- Chairman: Graham Simpson
- Manager: Aidy Boothroyd
- Stadium: Vicarage Road
- FA Premier League: 20th (relegated)
- FA Cup: Semi-finals
- League Cup: Fourth round
- Top goalscorer: League: Bouazza (7); All: Bouazza (8)
- Average home league attendance: 18,750

During the 2006–07 English football season, Watford competed in the FA Premier League, after being promoted from the Football League Championship last season.

== Season summary ==
Watford were involved in the setting of several Premier League records during the season: when Tottenham Hotspur keeper Paul Robinson accidentally scored for Spurs from a long free-kick that bounced over Ben Foster's head, he became only the third keeper to score in the Premier League (the other two being Peter Schmeichel and Brad Friedel); and when Alec Chamberlain (born in 1964) came on a substitute in a Premier League match, he became the oldest player to appear in the Premier League. Watford were relegated after only one season in the top-flight.

== Final league table ==
Pos	Team	Pld	W	D	L	GF	GA	GD	Pts	Qualification or relegation
16	Fulham	38	8	15	15	38	60	−22	39	
17	Wigan Athletic	38	10	8	20	37	59	−22	38	
18	Sheffield United (R)	38	10	8	20	32	55	−23	38	Relegation to Football League Championship
19	Charlton Athletic (R)	38	8	10	20	34	60	−26	34	Relegation to Football League Championship
20	Watford (R)	38	5	13	20	29	59	−30	28	Relegation to Football League Championship

Source: Barclays Premier League
Rules for classification: 1) points; 2) goal difference; 3) number of goals scored.
(R) Relegated

== Results ==
Watford's score comes first

=== Legend ===
Win	Draw	Loss

=== FA Premier League ===
==== Results by matchday ====
Matchday	1	2	3	4	5	6	7	8	9	10	11	12	13	14	15	16	17	18	19	20	21	22	23	24	25	26	27	28	29	30	31	32	33	34	35	36	37	38
Ground	A	H	H	A	H	A	H	A	A	H	H	A	A	H	A	H	A	A	H	A	H	A	H	A	H	A	H	H	H	A	H	A	H	A	H	A	A	H
Result	L	D	L	L	D	D	D	L	D	D	W	L	L	L	D	D	L	L	L	D	L	L	W	L	L	W	D	L	D	L	L	L	W	L	D	L	W	D
Position	16	13	18	20	18	18	19	19	18	17	16	19	19	19	19	20	20	20	20	20	20	20	20	20	20	20	20	20	20	20	20	20	20	20	20	20	20	20

A = Away; H = Home; W = Win; D = Draw; L = Loss

Date	Opponent	Venue	Result	Attendance	Scorers
19 August 2006	Everton	A	1–2	39,691	Francis
22 August 2006	West Ham United	H	1–1	18,344	King
26 August 2006	Manchester United	H	1–2	19,453	Francis
9 September 2006	Bolton Wanderers	A	0–1	21,140	
16 September 2006	Aston Villa	H	0–0	18,620	
23 September 2006	Wigan Athletic	A	1–1	16,359	Bouazza
2 October 2006	Fulham	H	3–3	17,982	King, Young (2)
14 October 2006	Arsenal	A	0–3	60,018	
21 October 2006	Charlton Athletic	A	0–0	27,011	
28 October 2006	Tottenham Hotspur	H	0–0	19,660	
4 November 2006	Middlesbrough	H	2–0	18,951	Woodgate (own goal), Young
11 November 2006	Chelsea	A	0–4	41,936	
18 November 2006	Portsmouth	A	1–2	19,738	DeMerit
28 November 2006	Sheffield United	H	0–1	18,887	
4 December 2006	Manchester City	A	0–0	35,915	
9 December 2006	Reading	H	0–0	19,223	
16 December 2006	Newcastle United	A	1–2	49,231	Bouazza
23 December 2006	Liverpool	A	0–2	42,807	
26 December 2006	Arsenal	H	1–2	19,750	Smith
1 January 2007	Fulham	A	0–0	19,698	
13 January 2007	Liverpool	H	0–3	19,746	
20 January 2007	Aston Villa	A	0–2	35,892	
23 January 2007	Blackburn Rovers	H	2–1	16,455	Emerton (own goal), DeMerit
31 January 2007	Manchester United	A	0–4	76,032	
3 February 2007	Bolton Wanderers	H	0–1	18,722	
10 February 2007	West Ham United	A	1–0	34,625	Henderson (pen)
21 February 2007	Wigan Athletic	H	1–1	18,338	Henderson
24 February 2007	Everton	H	0–3	18,761	
3 March 2007	Charlton Athletic	H	2–2	19,782	Bouazza, Francis
17 March 2007	Tottenham Hotspur	A	1–3	36,051	Henderson
31 March 2007	Chelsea	H	0–1	19,793	
7 April 2007	Middlesbrough	A	1–4	25,534	Francis
9 April 2007	Portsmouth	H	4–2	18,119	Bouazza (2, 1 pen), Mahon, Priskin
18 April 2007	Blackburn Rovers	A	1–3	16,035	Rinaldi
21 April 2007	Manchester City	H	1–1	18,537	Priskin
28 April 2007	Sheffield United	A	0–1	30,690	
5 May 2007	Reading	A	2–0	23,294	Shittu, King
13 May 2007	Newcastle United	H	1–1	19,830	King (pen)

=== FA Cup ===
Round	Date	Opponent	Venue	Result	Attendance	Goalscorers
R3	6 January 2007	Stockport County	H	4–1	11,745	Mackay (2), Smith, Ashikodi
R4	27 January 2007	West Ham United	A	1–0	31,168	McNamee
R5	17 February 2007	Ipswich Town	H	1–0	17,016	Francis
QF	11 March 2007	Plymouth Argyle	A	1–0	20,652	Bouazza
SF	14 April 2007	Manchester United	N	1–4	37,425	Bouazza

=== League Cup ===
Round	Date	Opponent	Venue	Result	Attendance	Goalscorers
R2	19 September 2006	Accrington Stanley	H	0–0 (won 6–5 on pens)	8,368	
R3	24 October 2006	Hull City	H	2–1	8,274	Young, Priskin
R4	7 November 2006	Newcastle United	H	2–2 (lost 4–5 on pens)	16,791	Francis, Shittu

== Players ==
=== First-team squad ===
Squad at end of season

Note: Flags indicate national team as defined under FIFA eligibility rules; some limited exceptions apply. Players may hold more than one non-FIFA nationality.

No.	Pos.	Nation	Player
1	GK	ENG	Alec Chamberlain
2	DF	ENG	James Chambers
3	DF	ENG	Jordan Stewart
4	DF	SCO	Malky Mackay
5	DF	ENG	Clarke Carlisle
6	DF	USA	Jay DeMerit
7	MF	JAM	Damien Francis (Note: Francis was born in Wandsworth, England, but also qualified to represent Jamaica internationally and made his international debut for Jamaica in 2003.)
8	MF	ENG	Gavin Mahon (captain)
9	FW	JAM	Marlon King (Note: King was born in Dulwich, England, but also qualified to represent Jamaica internationally and made his international debut for Jamaica in 2004.)
10	FW	ENG	Darius Henderson
11	DF	ENG	Chris Powell
12	DF	ENG	Lloyd Doyley (Note: Doyley was born in Tower Hamlets, England, but also qualified to represent Jamaica internationally and would make his international debut for Jamaica in March 2013.)
14	MF	ENG	Dominic Blizzard
15	FW	ENG	Steve Kabba
16	GK	ENG	Richard Lee
17	DF	NGA	Danny Shittu
18	FW	ALG	Hameur Bouazza (Note: Bouazza was born in Évry, France, but also qualified to represent Algeria internationally through his parents and made his international debut for Algeria in February 2007.)
19	MF	ENG	Anthony McNamee
20	MF	SLE	Alhassan Bangura
21	MF	FRA	Toumani Diagouraga

No.	Pos.	Nation	Player
22	DF	ENG	Junior Osborne
23	DF	ENG	Adrian Mariappa (Note: Mariappa was born in Harrow, England, but also qualified to represent Fiji internationally through his father and Jamaica internationally through his maternal grandparents and would make his international debut for Jamaica in June 2012.)
24	FW	HUN	Tamás Priskin (Note: Priskin was born in Komárno, Czechoslovakia (now Slovakia), but also qualified to represent Hungary internationally and made his international debut for Hungary in August 2005.)
25	MF	SCO	Gareth Williams
26	GK	ENG	Ben Foster (on loan from Manchester United)
27	FW	JAM	Joel Grant (Note: Grant was born in Ealing, England, but also qualified to represent Jamaica internationally and represented them at U-23 level before making his international debut for Jamaica in May 2014.)
28	MF	SLE	Albert Jarrett
29	FW	ENG	Tommy Smith
30	MF	ENG	Jordan Parkes
31	MF	BRA	Douglas Rinaldi (on loan from Veranópolis)
32	DF	FRA	Cédric Avinel (Note: Avinel was born in Paris, France, but also qualified to represent Guadeloupe internationally and would make his international debut for Guadeloupe in December 2008.)
33	GK	ENG	Scott Loach
34	MF	ENG	Ben Gill
35	MF	ENG	Alex Campana
36	FW	ENG	Moses Ashikodi (Note: Ashikodi was born in Lagos, Nigeria, but was raised in England and represented them at every youth level between U-16 and U-19 level. He also qualified to represent Antigua and Barbuda internationally and would make his international debut for Antigua and Barbuda in September 2012.)
37	FW	ENG	Will Hoskins
38	MF	ENG	Lee Williamson (Note: Williamson was born in Derby, England, but also qualified to represent Jamaica internationally and was called up by Jamaica in 2008 before making his international debut in September 2015.)
40	FW	ENG	Theo Robinson (Note: Robinson was born in Birmingham, England, but also qualified to represent Jamaica internationally and would make his international debut for Jamaica in February 2013.)
41	MF	FRA	Johan Cavalli

=== Left club during season ===
Note: Flags indicate national team as defined under FIFA eligibility rules; some limited exceptions apply. Players may hold more than one non-FIFA nationality.

No.	Pos.	Nation	Player
15	MF	ENG	Ashley Young (to Aston Villa)
25	MF	ENG	Matthew Spring (to Luton Town)

No.	Pos.	Nation	Player
31	FW	CIV	Claude Seanla (to Kettering Town)
32	DF	ENG	Sheku Kamara (released)

== Transfers ==
=== In ===
Date	Position	Name	Club From	Transfer Fee
30 June 2006	DF	(England) Chris Powell	(England) Charlton Athletic	Free
12 July 2006	MF	(Jamaica) Damien Francis	(England) Wigan Athletic	£1,500,000
6 August 2006	DF	(Nigeria) Danny Shittu	(England) Queens Park Rangers	£1,600,000 (rising to £3,000,000)
9 August 2006	MF	(Hungary) Tamás Priskin	(Hungary) Győr	Undisclosed
10 August 2006	GK	(England) Ben Foster	(England) Manchester United	Season-long loan
16 August 2006	MF	(Sierra Leone) Albert Jarrett	(England) Brighton & Hove Albion	Free
30 August 2006	FW	(England) Tommy Smith	(England) Derby County	£500,000
1 January 2007	MF	(England) Moses Ashikodi	(Scotland) Rangers	Nominal
5 January 2007	FW	(England) Will Hoskins	(England) Rotherham United	£1,000,000
5 January 2007	MF	(England) Lee Williamson	(England) Rotherham United	£1,000,000
26 January 2007	FW	(England) Steve Kabba	(England) Sheffield United	£500,000
31 January 2007	MF	(Scotland) Gareth Williams	(England) Leicester City	£600,000
31 January 2007	MF	(France) Johan Cavalli	(France) Istres	Free
31 January 2007	MF	(Brazil) Douglas Rinaldi	(Brazil) Veranópolis	Six-month loan
31 January 2007	DF	(France) Cédric Avinel	(France) Créteil	Free

=== Out ===
Date	Position	Name	Club To	Transfer Fee
18 January 2007	MF	(England) Matthew Spring	(England) Luton Town	£200,000 (rising to £300,000)
23 January 2007	MF	(England) Ashley Young	(England) Aston Villa	£8,000,000 (rising to £9,650,000)

- (Ivory Coast) Claude Seanla – (England) Kettering Town
- (England) Sheku Kamara – released
- (Jamaica) Francino Francis – (England) Redditch United, free
- (England) Les Ferdinand – retired
- (England) Joe O'Cearuill – (England) Arsenal, free

Transfers in: ▼ >£5,700,000 (rising to >£7,100,000)
Transfers out: ▲ >£8,200,000 (rising to >£9,950,000)

== Statistics ==
=== Appearances and goals ===
No.	Pos	Nat	Player	Total		Premier League		FA Cup		League Cup	
No.	Pos	Nat	Player	Apps	Goals	Apps	Goals	Apps	Goals	Apps	Goals
Goalkeepers
1	GK	(England) ENG	Alec Chamberlain	1	0	0+1	0	0	0	0	0
16	GK	(England) ENG	Richard Lee	14	0	9+1	0	2	0	2	0
26	GK	(England) ENG	Ben Foster	33	0	29	0	3	0	1	0
Defenders
2	DF	(England) ENG	James Chambers	15	0	8+4	0	1+1	0	1	0
3	DF	(England) ENG	Jordan Stewart	36	0	30+1	0	3	0	2	0
4	DF	(Scotland) SCO	Malky Mackay	17	2	13+1	0	2	2	0+1	0
5	DF	(England) ENG	Clarke Carlisle	5	0	4	0	1	0	0	0
6	DF	(United States) USA	Jay DeMerit	39	2	29+3	2	5	0	2	0
11	DF	(England) ENG	Chris Powell	18	0	9+6	0	2+1	0	0	0
12	DF	(England) ENG	Lloyd Doyley	25	0	17+4	0	0+2	0	2	0
17	DF	(Nigeria) NGA	Danny Shittu	34	2	27+3	1	2	0	2	1
23	DF	(England) ENG	Adrian Mariappa	25	0	17+2	0	5	0	1	0
30	DF	(England) ENG	Jordan Parkes	1	0	0	0	0	0	1	0
32	DF	(France) FRA	Cédric Avinel	1	0	1	0	0	0	0	0
Midfielders
7	MF	(Jamaica) JAM	Damien Francis	39	5	28+4	3	5	1	2	1
8	MF	(England) ENG	Gavin Mahon	38	1	33+1	1	3	0	1	0
14	MF	(England) ENG	Dominic Blizzard	1	0	0	0	0	0	1	0
19	MF	(England) ENG	Anthony McNamee	10	1	4+3	0	2	1	1	0
20	MF	(Sierra Leone) SLE	Al Bangura	20	0	12+4	0	2	0	1+1	0
21	MF	(France) FRA	Toumani Diagouraga	2	0	0	0	0+1	0	1	0
25	MF	(Scotland) SCO	Gareth Williams	3	0	2+1	0	0	0	0	0
28	MF	(Sierra Leone) SLE	Albert Jarrett	2	0	0+1	0	0	0	1	0
31	MF	(Brazil) BRA	Douglas Rinaldi	7	1	6+1	1	0	0	0	0
38	MF	(England) ENG	Lee Williamson	5	0	4+1	0	0	0	0	0
41	MF	(France) FRA	Johan Cavalli	4	0	2+1	0	1	0	0	0
Forwards
9	FW	(Jamaica) JAM	Marlon King	14	4	12+1	4	0+1	0	0	0
10	MF	(England) ENG	Darius Henderson	41	3	24+11	3	3+1	0	2	0
15	FW	(England) ENG	Steve Kabba	14	0	6+5	0	2+1	0	0	0
18	FW	(Algeria) ALG	Hameur Bouazza	38	8	27+5	6	3+1	2	2	0
24	FW	(Hungary) HUN	Tamás Priskin	22	3	7+9	2	2+1	0	3	1
29	FW	(England) ENG	Tommy Smith	37	2	32	1	5	1	0	0
36	FW	(England) ENG	Moses Ashikodi	3	1	0+2	0	1	1	0	0
37	FW	(England) ENG	Will Hoskins	9	0	4+5	0	0	0	0	0
40	FW	(England) ENG	Theo Robinson	1	0	0+1	0	0	0	0	0
Players transferred out during the season
15	MF	(England) ENG	Ashley Young	23	4	20	3	0+1	0	2	1
25	MF	(England) ENG	Matthew Spring	9	0	2+4	0	0	0	2+1	0
31	FW	(Ivory Coast) CIV	Claude Stephane Seanla	1	0	0	0	0	0	0+1	0
32	DF	(England) ENG	Sheku Kamara	1	0	0	0	0	0	0+1	0

Last updated: 15 May 2007
Source: Competitions
