= Cordice =

Cordice is a surname. Notable people with the surname include:

- John W. V. Cordice (1919–2014), American doctor and surgeon
- Neil Cordice (born 1960), English footballer
- Louis Cordice, a cast member in the Harry Potter film series
