= Sheku =

Sheku is a masculine given name. Notable people with the name include:

- Sheku Badara Bashiru Dumbuya (born 1945), Sierra Leonean politician
- Sheku Kamara (born 1987), British footballer and criminal
- Sheku Kanneh-Mason (born 1999), British cellist
