= Gary MacDonald (footballer) =

English footballer (born 1979)

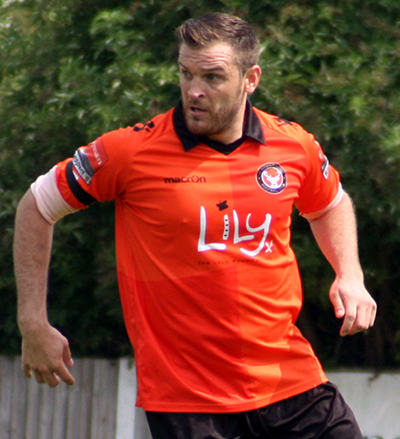
- MacDonald with Walton Casuals in 2014

Personal information
- Full name: Gary MacDonald
- Date of birth: 25 October 1979 (age 47)
- Place of birth: Iserlohn, Germany
- Position: Defender

Youth career
- 1996-1999: Portsmouth FC

Senior career*
Years	Team	Apps	(Gls)
2000–2001	Havant & Waterlooville	57	(2)
2001–2003	Peterborough United	18	(1)
2002–2003	→ Stevenage Borough (loan)	7	(0)
2003–2007	Woking	122	(4)
2007–2008	Ebbsfleet United	7	(0)
2008	→Bognor Regis Town (loan)	0	(0)
2008–2009	Hayes & Yeading United	25	(1)
2009–2010	Havant & Waterlooville	27	(2)
2010–2012	Kingstonian	20	(0)
2013	→ Metropolitan Police (loan)	10	(0)
2013–2014	Walton Casuals	20	(0)
2014	Slough Town	0	(0)
2014–2015	Hayes & Yeading United	24	(1)
2015	Slough Town	8	(0)
2015–2016	Farnborough	15	(1)
2016	Staines Town	3	(0)
2016	Walton & Hersham	7	(1)
2016–2017	Hayes & Yeading United	0	(0)
2017–2018	Hungerford Town	0	(0)

Managerial career
- 2016: Walton & Hersham (player-manager)
- 2016–2017: Hayes & Yeading United (player-assistant manager)
- 2017–2018: Hungerford Town (player-assistant manager)
- * Club domestic league appearances and goals as of 00:35 16 November 2013 (GMT)

Gary MacDonald (born 25 October 1979) is an English footballer who plays as a defender, and was most recently a player/assistant manager of Hungerford Town. He has made over 150 appearances in the Football League and the Conference Premier.

== Career ==
MacDonald began his career with Portsmouth but made no first-team appearances and joined non-league club Havant & Waterlooville. He joined Football League One club Peterborough United in February 2001 but struggled to break into the first-team, making 21 league and cup appearances in two years. He joined Football Conference side Stevenage Borough on loan in November 2001 and made eleven appearances for the club during the remainder of the 2001–02 season.

At the end of the season, he joined another National Conference side Woking, where he started 120 games in four years. He was signed by Ebbsfleet United in June 2007 but suffered a ruptured Achilles tendon in his first game for Ebbsfleet in August 2007, which ruled him out of the game for several months until he made his comeback in a Kent Senior Cup match in January 2008.

MacDonald returned to the first-team in March 2008 and by the end of the 2007–08 season, had made eight appearances for Ebbsfleet and collected a winners medal when Ebbsfleet won the FA Trophy at Wembley Stadium in May 2008. MacDonald returned to Havant & Waterlooville in 2009, but fell out of favour with the manager and made his last appearance for the club in March 2010. During the close-season of 2010, MacDonald signed for Kingstonian.

Following a one-month loan with Metropolitan Police, the 34-year-old signed for Walton Casuals. In July 2014, the versatile defender signed for Slough Town. He then briefly lined up for Farnborough, before a switch to Staines Town. He then joined Walton & Hersham in February 2016. Following the resignation of manager Mark Hams the following month, MacDonald was announced as player-manager for the eight remaining games of the 2015–16 season.

In July 2016 he was announced by Hayes & Yeading United to be Mickey Lewis' playing assistant manager, having had two previous spells with the club, most recently in 2015 under Phil Babb and Tristan Lewis.

== Honours ==
- FA Trophy: 2008
- Conference South Play-Off Winner: 2009
