= Jake Newton (footballer) =

Guyanese footballer (born 1984)

Personal information
- Full name: Jake Alexander Newton
- Date of birth: 9 June 1984 (age 42)
- Place of birth: Hammersmith, London, England
- Position: Right back

Team information
- Current team: Folland Sports

Youth career
- 1998–2003: Hampton & Richmond Borough

Senior career*
Years	Team	Apps	(Gls)
2003–2005	Staines Town		
2004	→ Chalfont St Peter (loan)		
2005–2006	Bashley		
2006–2009	Staines Town		
2009–2014	Havant & Waterlooville	125	(1)
2015–2016	Winchester City		
2016–2018	Walton & Hersham	62	(4)
2018–2020	Hamble Club	45	(7)
2020–2021	Hythe & Dibden	11	(1)
2021–	Folland Sports	52+	(8+)

International career^{‡}
2008–2018	Guyana	25 (Note: Newton also represented Guyana in 4 unofficial matches.)	(0)
- * Club domestic league appearances and goals as of 10:24, 21 September 2024 (UTC) ‡ National team caps and goals as of 1024, 21 September 2024 (UTC)

Jake Alexander Newton (born 9 June 1984) is a Guyanese footballer who plays as a right back for Folland Sports.

== Early and personal life ==
Born in Hammersmith, London, England, Newton is the younger brother of fellow footballer Howard Newton.

== Career ==
=== Club career ===
After spending five years with the Hampton & Richmond Borough youth team, Newton began his senior career in 2003 with Staines Town, and has also played for Chalfont St Peter, Bashley and Havant & Waterlooville. On 17 May 2018, Newton joined Wessex League side Hamble Club.

=== International career ===
Newton made his international debut for Guyana on 22 February 2008 in a friendly game against Cuba. He retired from international football in 2018 after a 2–2 draw against Barbados during 2019–20 CONCACAF Nations League qualifying.

He made 29 appearances for Guyana, with four coming in non-FIFA international matches.
