= Tim Alexander (footballer) =

English footballer

Personal information
- Full name: Timothy Mark Alexander
- Date of birth: 29 March 1973 (age 53)
- Place of birth: Chertsey, England
- Position: Central defender

Senior career*
Years	Team	Apps	(Gls)
1991–1992	Wimbledon	0	(0)
1992–1993	Woking	24	(0)
1993–1995	Barnet	36	(0)
- Gravesend & Northfleet
- Welling United
1995–1996	Woking	15	(0)
1995–1996	Dagenham & Redbridge	3	(0)
	Bromley	3	(0)
	Walton & Hersham	3	(0)
1999–2003	The New Saints	91	(13)
2003	→ Rhyl (loan)	3	(0)
Total		172	(13)
- * Club domestic league appearances and goals

Timothy Mark Alexander (born 29 March 1973) in Chertsey, Surrey, England, is an English retired professional footballer who played as a central defender for Wimbledon and Barnet in the Football League.
