= Nick Gindre =

Argentine footballer

Personal information
- Full name: Nicolas Emilio Gindre
- Date of birth: 24 July 1984 (age 42)
- Place of birth: Buenos Aires, Argentina
- Height: 1.87 m (6 ft 1 1/2 in)
- Position: Goalkeeper

Youth career
- 1999–2001: Walton Casuals

Senior career*
Years	Team	Apps	(Gls)
2001–2003	Walton Casuals	35	(0)
2003–2007	Walton & Hersham	154	(0)
2007–2009	Woking	41	(0)
2008	→ Croydon Athletic (loan)	15	(0)
2009	AFC Wimbledon	1	(0)
2009–2010	AmaZulu	8	(0)
2011–2012	Mpumalanga Black Aces	0	(0)
- * Club domestic league appearances and goals

Nicolas Emilio "Nick" Gindre (born 24 July 1984) is an Argentine footballer who last played as a goalkeeper for Mpumalanga Black Aces in South Africa.

== Career ==
Born in Buenos Aires, Gindre moved to England at the age of 10 and began football career with Walton Casuals at 14. He played for Walton Casuals for three years and moved to neighbouring club Walton & Hersham in 2003. He made his debut for Walton & Hersham in January as a 17-year-old. He had a trial with Millwall in August 2005. Gindre signed for Conference National team Woking in January 2007. He played 40 times for Woking before he went on loan to Croydon Athletic in November 2008. After returning from Croydon, he left Woking by mutual consent in January 2009 and he signed for AFC Wimbledon in February. He was contracted by AFC Wimbledon as keeper for the injured Andy Little and signed on 19 May 2009 for AmaZulu. He helped the club reach the final of the 2010 Nedbank Cup, saving three times in the semi-final penalty shootout.
