= Chris Sharpling =

English footballer

Personal information
- Date of birth: 21 April 1981 (age 45)
- Place of birth: Bromley, England
- Position: Forward

Senior career*
| Years | Team | Apps | (Gls) |
| 1999–2001 | Crystal Palace | 6 | (0) |
| 2001 | → Woking (loan) | 14 | (9) |
| 2001–2007 | Woking | 117 | (19) |
| 2006 | → Walton & Hersham (loan) | 2 | (0) |
| 2007 | Lewes | 5 | (0) |
| 2007 | Kingstonian | 5 | (0) |
| 2007 | Bromley | 4 | (1) |
| 2009 | Metropolitan Police | ? | (0) |
| Total | | 153 | (29) |
- * Club domestic league appearances and goals

Chris Sharpling (born 21 April 1981) is an English former professional footballer who played as a forward in the Football League. He made six league appearances for Crystal Palace in season 1999–2000 in the English second tier before moving into non-league football with Woking in 2001.
