= Jean-Michel Sigere =

French footballer (born 1977)

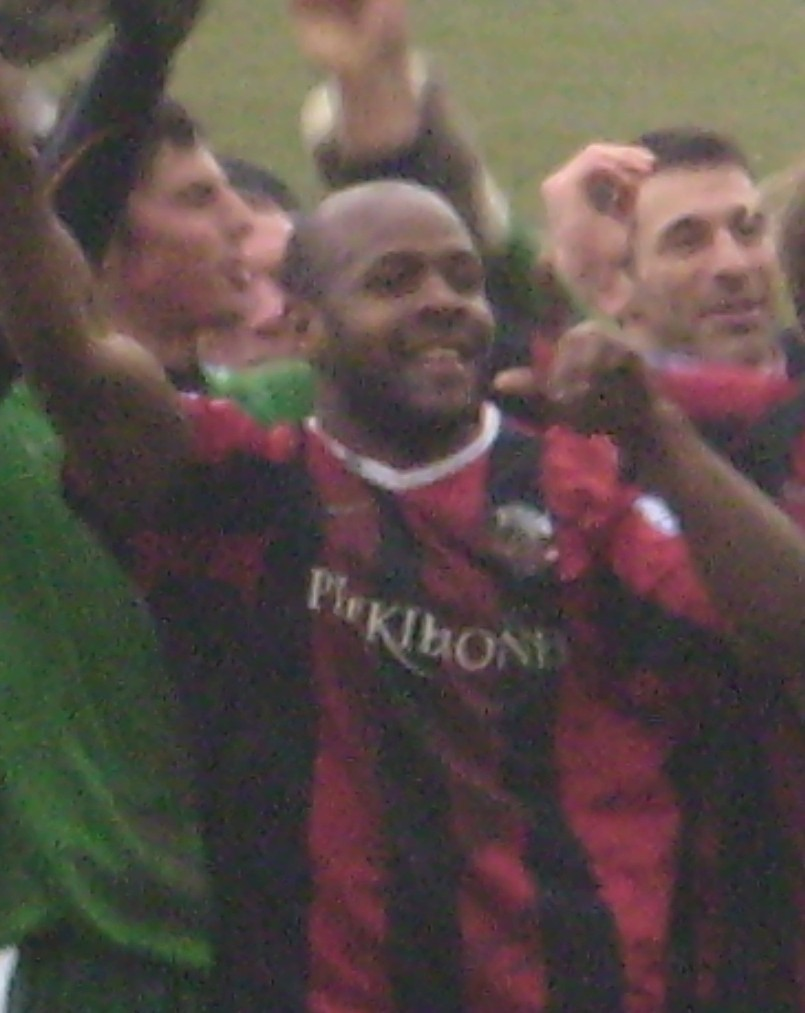
- Sigere and teammates celebrate Lewes winning the 2008 Conference South title

Personal information
- Full name: Jean-Michel Paul Sigere
- Date of birth: 26 January 1977 (age 49)
- Place of birth: Le François, Martinique
- Height: 1.83 m (6 ft 0 in)
- Position: Striker

Youth career
- Club Franciscain

Senior career*
Years	Team	Apps	(Gls)
199?–1995	Club Franciscain		
1995–1997	Quimper		
1997–1999	Bordeaux	0	(0)
1997–1999	Bordeaux B	34	(11)
1999–2000	Lusitanos Saint-Maur	16	(1)
2000	Rushden & Diamonds	34	(11)
2001–2002	Stevenage Borough	37	(13)
2002–2004	Margate	49	(9)
2004–2005	Hornchurch	19	(5)
2005	Heybridge Swifts	6	(4)
2005	Gravesend & Northfleet	11	(1)
2005–2008	Lewes	74	(37)
2007–2008	→ Horsham (loan)	4	(3)
2008–2009	Eastbourne Borough	5	(0)
2008–2009	→ Horsham (loan)	10	(4)
2009	Farnborough	7	(1)
2009	Tonbridge Angels	13	(1)
2009–2010	Lewes	20	(4)
2010	Margate	1	(0)
2010	St Albans City	9	(2)
2010–2011	→ Walton & Hersham (dual reg.)	18	(4)
2011–2012	Grays Athletic	18	(0)
2012	Chatham Town	8	(3)
2012–2013	Crawley Down Gatwick	6	(0)

International career
1997	France U20	1	(0)
- * Club domestic league appearances and goals

Jean-Michel Paul Sigere (born 26 January 1977) is a French former footballer who played as a striker. He began his football career with Club Franciscain in his native Martinique, and continued in mainland France with Quimper, Bordeaux B and Lusitanos Saint-Maur. He moved into English football in 2000, first with Rushden & Diamonds for whom he played seven Football League matches in the 2001–02 season, and then with a succession of non-league clubs mainly in the south-east of the country. In international football, he represented France at under-20 level.

== Early life and career in France ==
Jean-Michel Paul Sigere was born on 26 January 1977 in Le François, Martinique, where he began his football career. He joined Club Franciscain as a youngster, initially as a goalkeeper to be like his father, and later played on the right wing. He left Martinique for metropolitan France at 18, and after trials with Niort and Guingamp proved unsuccessful, signed for Quimper of the third-tier Championnat National. He spent two years with Quimper, at the end of which the team were relegated and then administratively demoted two further divisions for financial reasons.

He had attracted attention from elsewhere: after top-scoring in a tournament that led to his selection for the France under-20 squad for the 1997 Jeux de la Francophonie, Sigere was signed by Division 1 club Bordeaux on a two-year stagiaire (trainee) contract. He made one substitute appearance at the games, against Cameroon, without scoring, and his country failed to qualify for the knockout stages. He played for Bordeaux's reserve team in the Championnat de France Amateur (CFA), the fourth tier of French football, from 1997 to 1999, scoring 11 goals from 34 appearances, but was not offered a professional contract. He joined US Lusitanos Saint-Maur, under the management of Noël Tosi, who had "given him the opportunity to express himself" at Quimper. He made 16 starts, scoring once, as the team finished second in Group D of the CFA, by which time he had left the club to try his luck in England.

== Career in English football ==
=== Early years: 2000–2005 ===
After trials with Football League clubs including Crewe Alexandra, Halifax Town and Leyton Orient came to nothing, Sigere joined Rushden & Diamonds of the Football Conference on non-contract terms until the end of the 1999–2000 season. For the second time that season he contributed to his club reaching runners-up spot in their league. The following season, he played his part in Rushden winning the Conference championship, and thereby promotion to the Football League. He played seven games for Rushden in Division Three, and scored the goal which gave them their first home win in the Football League, but shortly afterwards manager Brian Talbot sold Sigere and Simon Wormull to Conference club Stevenage Borough for "a five-figure sum".

That season Stevenage reached the final of the FA Trophy. Sigere was actively involved in the match from its outset, putting in a first-minute cross for Kirk Jackson's header that drew a "superb save" from Yeovil Town's goalkeeper, but his team lost 2–0. Despite not joining the club until October, he finished the season with more shots on target than any other Stevenage player. Early in the 2002–03 season, Stevenage rejected a five-figure bid for him from Conference rivals Margate. No longer guaranteed a place in the starting eleven, the player submitted a transfer request. He marked his last game for Stevenage with a consolation goal in a 3–1 home defeat against Margate, and four days later signed for the Kent club for a fee of £7,500.

Margate manager Chris Kinnear described Sigere as "a strong and skilful striker capable of scoring a lot of goals", but his 18 months at the club produced only nine league goals from 49 appearances. In July 2004 he moved down a division, joining Hornchurch of the Conference South – referred to as "the non-league Chelsea", because they had a well-paid full-time professional squad despite playing in the sixth tier of English football – initially for three months, but with a view to a two-year deal. In November 2004 the club's owner's business collapsed, and the players' pay cheques were stopped; most players left for other clubs, though Sigere remained until January 2005, when the club was restructured and all remaining contracted players were released.

Sigere played six games for Heybridge Swifts of the Isthmian League Premier Division, scoring twice on his debut, before becoming Liam Daish's first signing for Conference club Gravesend & Northfleet. Again, and despite not being fully fit, he scored on debut. At the end of the season, Sigere failed to agree terms on a new full-time contract and left the club.

=== Lewes and Eastbourne: 2005–2009 ===
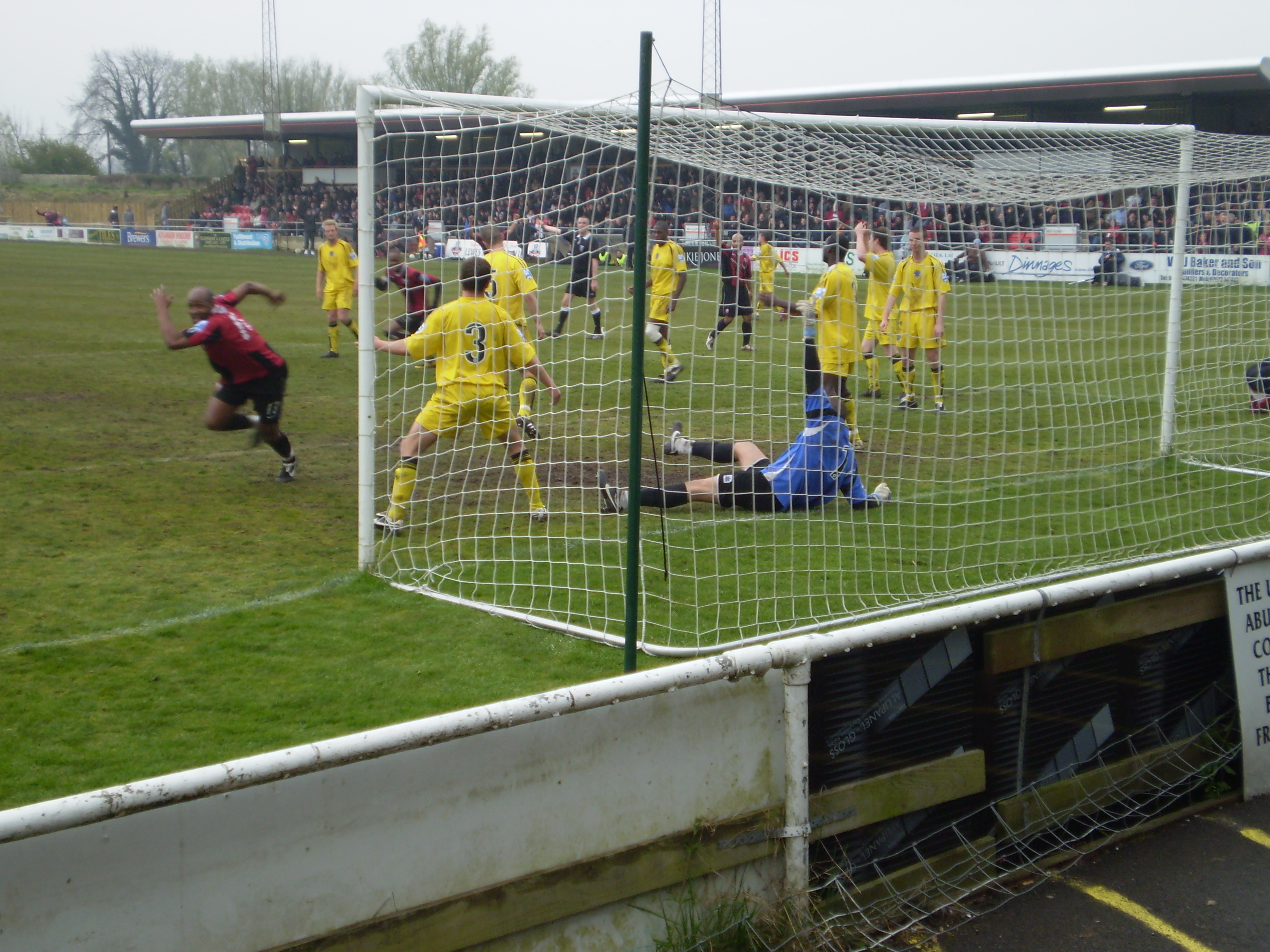
Sigere (left) wheels away after scoring the goal that clinched the 2007–08 Conference South title for Lewes.

Sigere went on to sign for Lewes of the Conference South. In his first season, he finished as the club's leading scorer, with 23 league goals from 41 starts, helping the club win the Sussex Senior Cup and reach fourth place in the league, though the ground's inadequacies meant they could not take their place in the play-offs. His 2006–07 season was disrupted by illness and knee problems, and surgery on an ACL injury was to keep him out of the game for several months. Loaned to Isthmian League Premier Division club Horsham in December 2007 for a month to regain match fitness, his first game for the club saw him score from long distance. On his return to Lewes his appearances were sporadic, though a winning goal in the sixth minute of stoppage time against Thurrock in March 2008 put his club four points clear at the top of the table. In April, his late goal against Dorchester Town confirmed Lewes as Conference South champions.

Following the dismissal of manager Steve King, many Lewes players left the club. Though the club wanted them to stay, Sigere and team-mate Simon Wormull joined local rivals Eastbourne Borough. The pair made their debuts in the opening-day defeat to former club Rushden & Diamonds, making Eastbourne the fifth club (following Rushden, Stevenage, Hornchurch and Lewes) for which the two played alongside each other. Injuries restricted Sigere's Eastbourne career: by the beginning of October he had played only five matches and been placed on the transfer list. He rejoined Horsham on loan for three months, to regain form and fitness with a view to a permanent deal. Yet again he scored on debut, this time converting a penalty to put Horsham through to the fourth qualifying round of the FA Cup. He scored and provided an assist in the next round against former club Stevenage Borough but, with a place in the first round proper in sight, Horsham conceded a late equaliser and went on to lose heavily in the replay. Both player and manager hoped to extend Sigere's stay at the club, but it was not financially viable, and he returned to Eastbourne having scored nine goals in all competitions for Horsham. Told he had no future at the club, he was released in January 2009.

=== Later career: 2009–2013 ===
Sigere signed a contract with Southern League Premier Division team Farnborough until the end of the 2008–09 season, and made his debut as a second-half substitute in a 2–2 home draw with Brackley Town. A reunion with new Farnborough manager Steve King saw him initially retained for the 2009–10 season, but on 16 June the club announced that Sigere would be leaving the club after all. Following his departure from Cherrywood Road, Sigere signed for Isthmian League Premier Division side Tonbridge Angels in July 2009. After scoring four goals from 25 appearances in all competitions, mostly as a substitute, Sigere left Tonbridge to return to Lewes. He contributed to Lewes retaining their Conference South status, but was released at the end of the season when budgetary constraints forced manager Steve Ibbitson to choose between Sigere and the younger Rob Gradwell. Sigere returned to former club Margate for the 2010–11 Isthmian League Premier Division season, but after only one game budgetary considerations again came into play and he was released. A few days later he returned to the Conference South with St Albans City, where he stayed for a couple of months before moving on to Walton & Hersham of the Isthmian League Division One South.

In June 2011, Sigere signed for Isthmian League Division One North club Grays Athletic. He went on to play 22 matches for Grays in all first-team competitions. He moved on to fellow Division One North club Chatham Town at the end of the season, and in November, moved into the southern division with Crawley Down Gatwick on a free transfer.

== Honours ==
US Lusitanos Saint-Maur

- CFA Group D runners-up: 1999–2000

Rushden & Diamonds

- Football Conference champions: 2000–01
- Football Conference runners-up: 1999–2000

Stevenage Borough

- FA Trophy finalists: 2001–02

Lewes

- Conference South champions: 2007–08
