= Alan Dowson =

English football player and manager

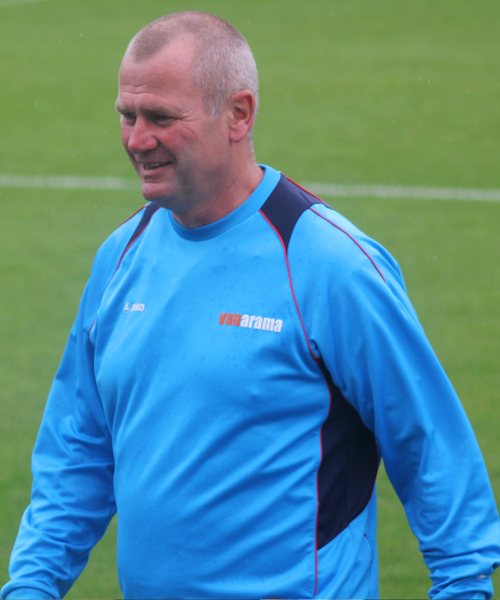
- Dowson managing Hampton & Richmond Borough in 2017

Personal information
- Date of birth: 17 June 1970 (age 56)
- Place of birth: Gateshead, England
- Position: Defender

Team information
- Current team: Kingstonian (manager)

Youth career
- –1988: Millwall

Senior career*
Years	Team	Apps	(Gls)
1988–1991	Millwall	1	(0)
1990	→ Fulham (loan)	4	(0)
1991–1992	Bradford City	18	(0)
1992–1993	Darlington	32	(0)
1993–1994	Slough Town	43	(0)
1994–1996	Gateshead		
1996–2006	Walton & Hersham		
Total		98	(0)

Managerial career
- 2004–2007: Walton & Hersham
- 2007–2014: Kingstonian
- 2014–2018: Hampton & Richmond Borough
- 2018–2022: Woking
- 2022–2024: Dartford
- 2024: Hemel Hempstead Town (interim)
- 2025: Aldershot Town (caretaker)
- 2025–2026: Hampton & Richmond Borough
- 2026–: Kingstonian
- * Club domestic league appearances and goals

Alan Dowson (born 17 June 1970) is an English football coach and former professional player who is the manager of Kingstonian.

He made 55 appearances in the Football League between 1988 and 1993, before spending 13 years as a player in non-league football. He later managed a number of non-league football teams.

== Playing career ==
Dowson began his playing career with Millwall, progressing through the youth ranks before signing a professional contract with the first time in May 1988. Making a single appearance for the Lions, he also played for Fulham on a one-month loan in January 1990.

After his release from Millwall, Dowson was quickly snapped up by Bradford City, where he made 18 appearances in a single season. A year with Darlington saw the defender become a regular in the first team before dropping into non-league football.

Joining Slough Town ahead of the 1993–94 season, Dowson featured 43 times throughout the campaign joining Gateshead, he then spent two years with Gateshead before over a decade at Walton & Hersham. On 20 December 1996, Dowson signed for the Surrey club - who had recently been relegated to the Isthmian League Division One.

Dowson announced his retirement from playing at the end of the 2005–06 season.

== Managing career ==
After eight years with Walton & Hersham in a playing capacity, the club announced Dowson was to feature as player-manager in October 2004. Finishing as runners-up in his debut managerial campaign, Dowson also guided the club to the fourth round of the FA Trophy while recording a record-breaking 13-match winning run in all competitions.

Dowson announced his resignation from the Swans in January 2007, shortly before joining Kingstonian. In his second full season as manager, he saw his side crowned champions of the Isthmian Division One South and promoted to the Premier Division. The K's finished fifth upon their return to the seventh tier in the 2009–10 season, but missed out on back-to-back promotions, losing in the play-off final to Boreham Wood.

In his final season as manager of Kingstonian, Dowson recorded his best league finish of second - following two seasons in a mid-table position. However, they failed to gain promotion once again after defeat in the play-offs semi-final. He announced his resignation at the end of the season to spend some time away from football and focus on his family.

On 14 September 2014, Dowson was unveiled as manager at Hampton & Richmond Borough. Joined by his familiar backroom staff, including Premier League commentator Martin Tyler, Dowson guided the Isthmian Premier Division side to a 12th-placed finish in his inaugural season. After a lacklustre 2014-15 campaign saw the Beavers finish 15th, Dowson led Hampton to become champions during the 2015–16 season, losing just seven league fixtures while scoring 105 goals.

He was appointed Woking manager in May 2018. In his first season in charge Dowson took Woking to a 2nd-placed finish, gaining promotion to the National League with a 1–0 win against Welling United in the playoff-final. The club also enjoyed its most successful FA Cup run in almost two decades, defeating Swindon Town to earn a famous home tie with Premier League club Watford in the Third Round of the FA Cup. Woking, the only Level 6 side left in the competition, lost the match 2–0. On 28 February 2022, Dowson was sacked by the club following a "prolonged run of poor form in the league", ending his four-year association with the Surrey-based side.

In May 2022 he became manager of Dartford. Dowson oversaw an impressive start to the season that saw him awarded the National League South Manager of the Month award for October 2022.

On 11 January 2024, Dowson was relieved of his management duties at Dartford.

On 7 March 2024, Dowson was appointed manager of National League South club Hemel Hempstead Town on an interim basis until the end of the season. He departed the club on 15 April 2024 with one match of the season remaining.

In August 2025, Dowson joined National League club Aldershot Town as a first-team coach. On 14 October 2025, following the resignation of manager Tommy Widdrington, he was put in joint-caretaker charge alongside Hugo Langton.

On 8 December 2025, Dowson returned to Hampton & Richmond Borough for his second spell as manager. On 12 October 2026, Dowson was relieved of his duties.

On 26 October 2026, Dowson was appointed manager of Kingstonian.

== Career statistics ==
=== Manager ===
As of match played 10 October 2026

Managerial record by team and tenure
Team	From	To	Record					Ref
Team	From	To	P	W	D	L	Win %	Ref
Hampton & Richmond Borough	14 September 2014	16 May 2018	183	84	53	46	45.9	
Woking	16 May 2018	28 February 2022	175	69	34	72	39.4	
Dartford	31 May 2022	11 January 2024	84	39	15	30	46.4	
Hemel Hempstead Town (interim)	7 March 2024	15 April 2024	10	1	3	6	10.0	
Aldershot Town (caretaker)	14 October 2025	24 October 2025	2	0	0	2	0.0	
Hampton & Richmond Borough	8 December 2025	12 October 2026	39	11	9	19	28.2	
Total			493	204	114	175	41.4	
