= Craig Ross (footballer) =

English footballer

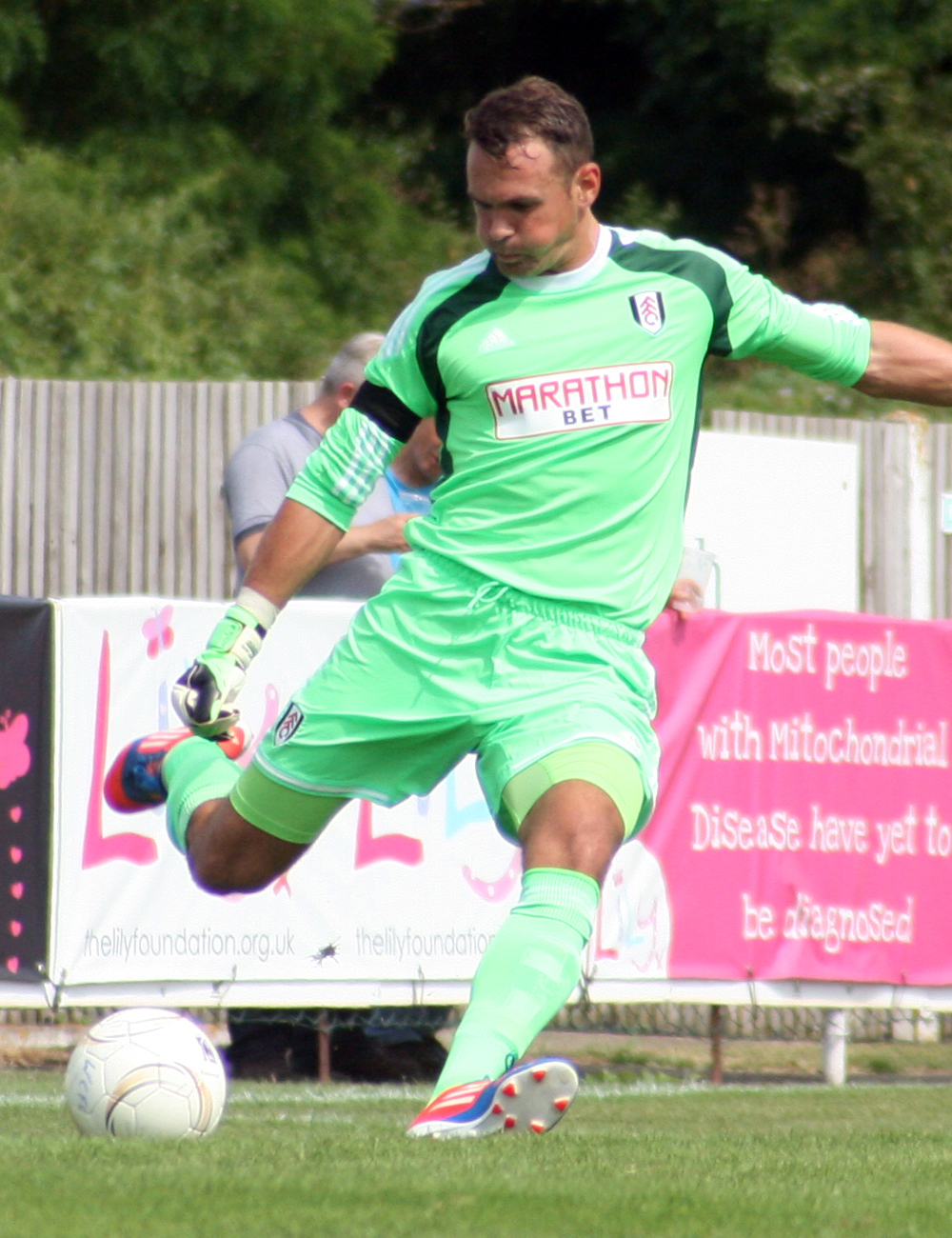
- Ross playing for Fulham U21s in 2014

Personal information
- Full name: Craig Alexander Patrick Ross
- Date of birth: 29 January 1990 (age 36)
- Place of birth: Walton-on-Thames, England
- Height: 1.88 m (6 ft 2 in)
- Position: Goalkeeper

Team information
- Current team: Woking
- Number: 13

Youth career
- Southampton
- Arsenal
- Reading
- Crystal Palace
- –2007: Colchester United
- 2007–2008: Woking

Senior career*
Years	Team	Apps	(Gls)
2008–2010	Ashford Town	62	(0)
2010–2011	Carshalton Athletic	42	(0)
2011	Godalming Town	1	(0)
2011	Welling United	0	(0)
2011–2012	Hampton & Richmond Borough	29	(0)
2012–2013	Cambridge United	15	(0)
2012	→ Eastbourne Borough (loan)	3	(0)
2013–2014	Eastbourne Borough	42	(0)
2014	Farnborough	2	(0)
2014–2016	Whitehawk	69	(0)
2016–2017	Macclesfield Town	22	(0)
2017–2018	Barnet	33	(0)
2018	Leatherhead	3	(0)
2018–2023	Woking	173	(0)
2023–2025	Maidenhead United	86	(0)
2025–	Woking	4	(0)

Managerial career
- 2026: Woking (joint-interim)
- 2026–: Woking (interim)
- * Club domestic league appearances and goals as of 19:02, 24 August 2025 (UTC)

Craig Alexander Patrick Ross (born 29 January 1990) is an English football player and coach who plays as a goalkeeper for National League club Woking, where he also serves as interim manager.

== Career ==
Ross began his career in the youth academies of Southampton, Arsenal, Reading, Crystal Palace, Colchester United and Woking.

He began his senior career with Ashford Town (Middlesex) in 2008 before moving to Carshalton Athletic. After short spells with Godalming Town and Welling United, Ross joined Hampton & Richmond Borough.

In August 2012, Ross joined Cambridge United as back-up to Jonathan Hedge. During the 2012–13 season, he spent time on loan with Eastbourne Borough, before joining the club permanently for the 2013–14 campaign.

Ross briefly joined Farnborough at the beginning of the 2014–15 season before moving to Whitehawk, where he spent two seasons. In 2016, he signed for Macclesfield Town ahead of the 2016–17 season. After turning down a new contract with Macclesfield, Ross joined Barnet on a one-year deal on 1 July 2017.

Ross made his Barnet debut in the EFL Cup against Brighton & Hove Albion on 22 August 2017. He went on to make 33 league appearances during the 2017–18 season, but was released following the club's relegation from EFL League Two.

Following a spell with Leatherhead, Ross returned to Woking in September 2018. He made his debut on the same day, featuring in a 2–2 draw against Torquay United.

Ross played a key role in Woking's successful 2018–19 campaign, helping the club defeat Welling United in the National League South play-off final on 12 May 2019 to secure an immediate return to the National League. He signed a new two-year contract with the club on 12 April 2021.

After falling out of favour following the arrival of Will Jääskeläinen, it was announced that Ross would leave Woking at the end of the 2022–23 season after five years back with the Cardinals. He made 198 appearances during his second spell with the club between 2018 and 2023.

On 9 June 2023, Ross agreed to join fellow National League side Maidenhead United. After making 94 appearances, he departed the club at the end of the 2024–25 season.

Ross returned to Woking ahead of the 2025–26 season as a player/goalkeeping coach. Following the departure of first-team manager Neal Ardley, Ross was appointed interim manager alongside Dale Gorman and Jake Hyde on 1 March 2026. During his interim spell in charge, Ross, alongside Gorman and Hyde, guided the team to four wins from eight matches before Jermain Defoe was appointed first-team manager at the end of March. On 24 July 2026, Ross and Hyde were reinstated as interim first-team managers following Defoe's abrupt departure just two weeks before the start of the 2026–27 campaign.

== Career statistics ==
As of match played 8 September 2026

Appearances and goals by club, season and competition
Club	Season	League			FA Cup		League Cup		Other		Total	
Club	Season	Division	Apps	Goals	Apps	Goals	Apps	Goals	Apps	Goals	Apps	Goals
Hampton & Richmond Borough	2011–12	Conference South	29	0	0	0	—		5 (Note: Appearance(s) in FA Trophy)	0	34	0
Cambridge United	2012–13	Conference Premier	15	0	0	0	—		0	0	15	0
Eastbourne Borough (loan)	2012–13	Conference South	3	0	0	0	—		0	0	3	0
Eastbourne Borough	2013–14	Conference South	42	0	3	0	—		1	0	46	0
Farnborough	2014–15	Conference South	2	0	2	0	—		0	0	4	0
Whitehawk	2014–15	Conference South	27	0	—		—		4 (Note: One appearance in FA Trophy, three in Conference South play-offs)	0	31	0
Whitehawk	2015–16	National League South	42	0	7	0	—		4 (Note: Two appearances in FA Trophy, two in Conference South play-offs)	0	53	0
Whitehawk	Total		69	0	7	0	—		8	0	84	0
Macclesfield Town	2016–17	National League	22	0	4	0	—		1	0	27	0
Barnet	2017–18	League Two	33	0	1	0	1	0	3 (Note: Appearance(s) in EFL Trophy)	0	38	0
Leatherhead	2018–19	Isthmian League Premier Division	3	0	—		—		0	0	3	0
Woking	2018–19	National League South	32	0	5	0	—		5 (Note: Three appearances in FA Trophy, two in National League South play-offs)	0	42	0
Woking	2019–20	National League	36	0	2	0	—		1	0	39	0
Woking	2020–21	National League	39	0	2	0	—		5	0	46	0
Woking	2021–22	National League	33	0	1	0	—		1	0	35	0
Woking	2022–23	National League	33	0	2	0	—		1	0	36	0
Woking	Total		173	0	12	0	—		13	0	198	0
Maidenhead United	2023–24	National League	46	0	2	0	—		2 (Note: One appearance in FA Trophy, one in Berks & Bucks Senior Cup)	0	50	0
Maidenhead United	2024–25	National League	40	0	3	0	—		1	0	44	0
Maidenhead United	Total		86	0	5	0	—		3	0	94	0
Woking	2025–26	National League	4	0	0	0	—		5 (Note: Two appearances in National League Cup, Three appearances in FA Trophy)	0	9	0
Woking	2026–27	National League	0	0	0	0	—		2 (Note: Appearance(s) in National League Cup)	0	2	0
Woking	Total		4	0	0	0	—		7	0	11	0
Career total			481	0	34	0	1	0	41	0	557	0

== Managerial statistics ==
As of match played 3 October 2026

Managerial record by team and tenure
Team	From	To	Record					Ref.
Team	From	To	P	W	D	L	Win %	Ref.
Woking (interim)	1 March 2026	29 March 2026	8	4	3	1	50.0	
Woking (interim)	24 July 2026	Present	14	5	4	5	35.7	
Total			22	9	7	6	40.9	

== Honours ==
Woking

- National League South play-offs: 2018–19

Individual

- Fans Player of the Season 2019-20, 2020–21
- Players Player of the Season 2019-20, 2020–21
- Managers Player of the Season 2019-20, 2020–21
