= Roy Odiaka =

French footballer (born 1992)

Personal information
- Full name: Roy Odiaka
- Date of birth: 22 March 1992 (age 34)
- Place of birth: Colombes, France
- Height: 1.81 m (5 ft 11 in)
- Position: Forward

Youth career
- –2007: AF Garenne Colombes
- 2007–2010: Dulwich Hamlet
- 2010–2012: Crystal Palace
- 2012: Stoke City

Senior career*
Years	Team	Apps	(Gls)
2009–2010	Dulwich Hamlet	4	(2)
2012–2013	Beckenham Town	6	(1)
2013	Walton Casuals	4	(0)
2013	Walton & Hersham	3	(2)
2013	Universitatea Cluj	4	(0)
Total		21	(5)
- * Club domestic league appearances and goals as of 27 March 2016

Roy Odiaka (born 22 March 1992) is a French former footballer who played as a forward. He last played for Universitatea Cluj.

== Club career ==
Odiaka's career began with AFC Garenne Colombes, who he featured for in the youth ranks. At the age of 16, Odiaka was handed the opportunity of a trial with Norwich City. He featured for the Under-18s in a fixture with Norfolk County in August 2008, in which he scored twice. However, he later joined Dulwich Hamlet before a move to the Canaries could progress.

In July 2010, Odiaka was snapped up by Crystal Palace and he headed into the Under-21s. He went on to line-up for Stoke City Under-21s on three occasions, scoring once. With his first taste of action coming in a 5-1 defeat to Newcastle United on 3 September 2012, a debut goal would also be his only goal for the club. Following a 7-2 defeat to Tottenham Hotspur, his final appearance came in against Southampton in early October.

After failing to impress, he joined non-league outfit Beckenham Town in February 2012. Scoring one goal for the club, in a 3-0 win over Rochester United, he later joined Isthmian League Division One South club Walton Casuals for a short spell. Following four appearances, in which he failed to find the net, he joined local rivals Walton & Hersham.

Odiaka then moved to Romania to play in Liga I, joining Universitatea Cluj. After a successful trial earlier in the month, in which manager Ionel Ganea took less than 24 hours to offer a deal, he made his professional debut on 21 July 2013, replacing Cătălin Dedu at half-time in a 1-0 defeat to Petrolul Ploiești. Despite signing a three-year contract, he managed just a further three appearances before having his contract terminated on 10 September 2013.

Due to family relations, Odiaka was eligible to represent Nigeria, France or Senegal national teams.
