= Trevor Jones Memorial Trophy =

The Trevor Jones Memorial Trophy is a single match football competition held every pre-season at Kingsmeadow in memory of Trevor Jones, previously Kingstonian's Reserve Team Manager, who died from electrocution at the age of 34.

It was originally contested between Kingstonian and AFC Wimbledon; but after the 2009 edition AFC Wimbledon pulled out and The K's have played Woking and a Fulham XI. The first installment of this competition in July 2003 was known as the Kingsmeadow Cup, but the name was changed after Trevor Jones' death.

== Past winners ==
Year	Date	Winners	Score	Runners up	Att.	Report
2003	Wed 16/07/03	Kingstonian	2-0	AFC Wimbledon	1,417	
2004	Tue 03/08/04	AFC Wimbledon	4-1	Kingstonian	1,101	
2005	Tue 26/07/05	AFC Wimbledon	2-0	Kingstonian	871	
2006	Sat 12/08/06	Kingstonian	p0-0	AFC Wimbledon	596	
2007	Sat 11/08/07	AFC Wimbledon	2-0	Kingstonian	702	
2008	Mon 28/07/08	AFC Wimbledon	p1-1	Kingstonian	354	
2009	Sat 18/07/09	Kingstonian	2-0	Woking	320	
2010	Fri 30/07/10	Fulham XI	3-2	Kingstonian	332	
2011	Sat 30/07/11	Woking	2-0	Kingstonian	274	
