= Andy Sayer =

English footballer

Personal information
- Full name: Andrew Clive Sayer
- Date of birth: 6 June 1966 (age 60)
- Place of birth: Brent, England
- Height: 5 ft 9 in (1.75 m)
- Position: Forward

Senior career*
Years	Team	Apps	(Gls)
1983–1988	Wimbledon	58	(15)
1986	→ Vasalunds IF (loan)	18	(3)
1987–1988	→ Cambridge United (loan)	5	(0)
1988–1990	Fulham	53	(15)
1990–1992	Leyton Orient	30	(6)
1990–1991	→ Sheffield United (loan)	3	(0)
1992–1995	Slough Town	147	(39)
1995–1996	Enfield	?	(?)
1996–1999	Walton & Hersham	?	(?)
2000–2001	Leatherhead	?	(?)
2001	Egham Town	?	(?)
2001–2002	Tooting & Mitcham United	6	(1)
2002–2005	Molesey	?	(?)
2005–2006	Bisley Sports	?	(?)
- * Club domestic league appearances and goals

Andrew Clive Sayer (born 6 June 1966) is an English former professional footballer who played in the Football League as a forward. In February 1987, he scored a top-flight hat-trick against Newcastle United.
