= Richard Teale =

English professional footballer

Personal information
- Full name: Richard Grant Teale
- Date of birth: 27 February 1952 (age 74)
- Place of birth: Millom, England
- Height: 6 ft 1 in (1.85 m)
- Position: Goalkeeper

Senior career*
Years	Team	Apps	(Gls)
1972–1973	Walton & Hersham	?	(?)
1973–1976	Queens Park Rangers	1	(0)
1976–1977	Fulham	5	(0)
1977–1978	Wimbledon	15	(0)
1978–1981	Slough Town	120	(0)
1981-1983	Staines Town	70	(?)
1983	Walton & Hersham	?	(?)
	Carshalton Athletic	?	(?)
1984	Slough Town	5	(0)
1987-1988	Staines Town	0	(?)
- * Club domestic league appearances and goals

Richard Grant Teale (born 27 February 1952 in Millom, Cumbria) is an English former professional footballer who played as a goalkeeper in the Football League for Queens Park Rangers, Fulham and Wimbledon, and in non-league football for a number of clubs in the London area.
