= Dave Donaldson (footballer, born 1941) =

English footballer

Personal information
- Date of birth: 28 December 1941 (age 84)
- Place of birth: Hillingdon, England
- Date of death: 30 March 2022
- Position: Central defender

Senior career*
| Years | Team | Apps | (Gls) |
| 1973–1974 | Walton & Hersham | ? | (?) |
| 1974–1979 | Wimbledon | 181 | (3) |
- * Club domestic league appearances and goals

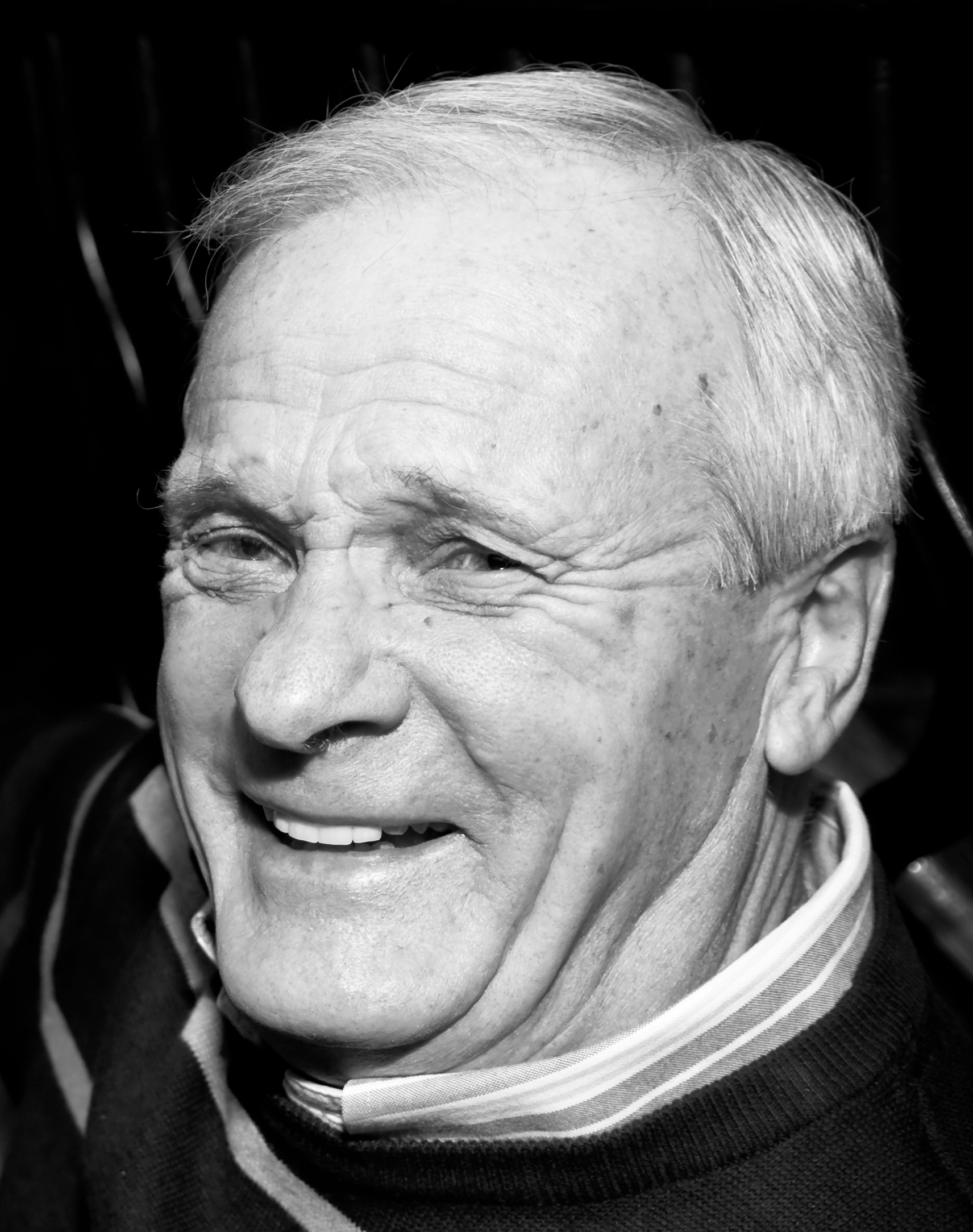
Dave Donaldson (14 Jan 2010)

David Donaldson (born 28 December 1941) is an English former professional footballer who played in the Football League, as a defender. suffered in his final years with severe dementia and died in a care home on 30 March 2022 aged 80.
