= Howard Newton =

English-born Guyanese footballer

Personal information
- Date of birth: 16 March 1982 (age 44)
- Place of birth: London, England
- Height: 1.72 m (5 ft 7 1/2 in)
- Position: Winger

Senior career*
Years	Team	Apps	(Gls)
- Sutton United
- Hampton & Richmond Borough
- Wembley
- Hitchin Town
- Staines Town
- Epsom & Ewell
- Dagenham & Redbridge
2004–2006	Harrow Borough		
2006–2010	Staines Town		
2010	Hamilton Wanderers		
2012–2014	Metropolitan Police		
2014–2015	Tooting & Mitcham United		
2015–2016	Chipstead		
2016	Winchester City		
2016–2018	Walton & Hersham		
2018	Walton & Hersham	3	(0)
2019	Egham Town		
2019–????	South Park		

International career
2008–2012	Guyana	10	(0)
- * Club domestic league appearances and goals as of 21:00, 19 January 2019 (UTC)

Howard Newton (born 16 March 1982) is a Guyanese former international footballer.

== Club career ==
Newton began his club career in England, playing with teams including Sutton United, Hampton & Richmond Borough, Wembley, Hitchin Town, Staines Town, Epsom & Ewell, Dagenham & Redbridge and Harrow Borough. In August 2009, Newton had an unsuccessful trial with Football League side Gillingham.

Newton then joined New Zealand side Hamilton Wanderers in the summer of 2010, helping the club win the league. Upon his return to England, he joined non-league club Bromley. However, he managed just a single appearance for the Ravens before his departure at the end of the season.

In July 2011, Newton moved to Staines Town for his third spell with the club, enjoying a more successful season while scoring once in 15 games. Leaving the club in the New Year, he made his debut for St Albans City on 28 January 2012. He totalled five goals in 11 appearances for the club throughout the remainder of the season.

He moved to Metropolitan Police ahead of the 2012–13 season, and remained at Imber Court for two seasons while coming close to making 50 appearances.

Newton joined Tooting & Mitcham United in June 2014, under the management of Craig Tanner. The winger saw his first ever dismissal in November 2014, after 17 years in the game.

In November 2015, he joined former boss Tanner at Chipstead in a bid for Ryman Division One South survival. Once relegation was avoided, he joined Winchester City in March 2016 to finish the season alongside his brother, Jake.

Newton was announced as a player/assistant manager of Walton & Hersham on 22 June 2016. He remained with The Swans for two seasons. On 9 October 2018, he returned to the club as he featured in the Southern Combination Challenge Cup against Walton Casuals.

The spell ended with a 3–0 loss at Spelthorne Sports on 29 December, as he moved away from the Combined Counties League and one step up the league ladder to play for Isthmian League South Central Division strugglers Egham Town. His debut on 12 January 2019 was unfortunate, breaking a bone in his right foot against Chalfont St Peter.

In June 2019, Newton joined South Park.

== International career ==
Newton made his international debut for Guyana on 22 February 2008 in a 2-1 friendly victory overt Cuba. He went on to make a further 11 appearances, with his final coming in a 3–1 defeat to Mexico on 8 June 2012. Following his debut, Newton played in just one other victory for the national side, appearing in a 2–0 victory over Barbados on 7 October 2011 in 2014 FIFA World Cup Qualification.
