= Chris McClaren =

English footballer

Personal information
- Full name: Christopher McClaren
- Date of birth: 14 March 1963
- Place of birth: Bristol, England
- Position: Defender

Senior career*
Years	Team	Apps	(Gls)
- Walton & Hersham
1987	Darlington	3	(0)
- * Club domestic league appearances and goals

Christopher McClaren (born 14 March 1963) is an English former footballer who played three matches on a non-contract basis for Darlington in the latter part of the 1986–87 Football League season. A defender, he also played non-league football for Walton & Hersham.
