= Danny Francis (footballer, born 1986) =

Dominican footballer (born 1986)

Personal information
- Full name: Daniel Leslie Francis
- Date of birth: 1 October 1986 (age 40)
- Place of birth: London, England
- Height: 1.78 m (5 ft 10 in)
- Position: Forward

Youth career
- Arsenal
- Leyton Orient

Senior career*
Years	Team	Apps	(Gls)
2004–2005	Enfield Town	28	(1)
2006–2007	Aveley		
2007–2008	Canvey Island		
2008–2009	Potters Bar Town		
2009	Dulwich Hamlet		
2009–2010	Walton & Hersham		
2010	Leyton		
2011	Bishop's Stortford	2	(0)
2011–2012	Aveley		
2012–2015	Tilbury		
2015–2016	Thurrock		
2016–2017	Haringey Borough		

International career
2008	Dominica	2	(0)
- * Club domestic league appearances and goals

Daniel Leslie Francis (born 1 October 1986) is a retired professional footballer who played as a forward. Born in England, he represented the Dominica national team.

== Career ==
=== Club career ===
Francis started his youth footballing career with teams Arsenal and Leyton Orient. He then joined Enfield Town in January 2004, making his professional debut with Enfield in an Essex Senior League Cup tie against Bowers United. Francis then moved on to feature for Aveley and thereafter for club Canvey Island in July 2007.

He also went on to link up afterward with sides Potters Bar Town, Walton & Hersham and Leyton. Francis was at Dulwich Hamlet in early 2009, and then appeared for Grays Athletic in a July 2009 pre-season friendly against West Ham United. In early 2011, Francis joined up with Bishop's Stortford. Francis signed with Thurrock at the beginning of the 2015–16 season, before moving on to Haringey Borough in September 2016.

== International career ==
Francis earned two caps for the Dominican national team in 2008, both of which were FIFA World Cup qualifying matches.

== Personal life ==
Francis is a fan of Arsenal Football Club.
