= Gavin Holligan =

English footballer and musician

Personal information
- Full name: Gavin Victor Holligan
- Date of birth: 30 June 1980 (age 46)
- Place of birth: Lambeth, London, England
- Position: Striker

Senior career*
Years	Team	Apps	(Gls)
1997–1998	Walton and Hersham		
1998	Kingstonian	17	(5)
1998–2001	West Ham United	1	(0)
1999	→ Leyton Orient (loan)	1	(0)
2000	→ Exeter City (loan)	3	(0)
2001	→ Kingstonian (loan)	7	(2)
2001–2004	Wycombe Wanderers	43	(8)
2003–2004	→ Crawley Town (loan)		
2004	Hornchurch		
2004–2005	Havant and Waterlooville	22	(6)
2005	Lewes		
- * Club domestic league appearances and goals

Gavin Victor Holligan (born 30 June 1980) is an English former footballer and musician.

== Football career ==
Holligan turned down a university scholarship to study music in order to play football. He started his footballing career with Walton and Hersham in August 1997 and at one stage had 18 of 20 Premier League teams representatives watching him play. Having impressed in non-league football he made a £150,000 move from Conference side Kingstonian to the Premiership with West Ham United in November 1998. However, he failed to break into the first team, making just one appearance in the 2–2 draw with Liverpool at Anfield in February 1999 coming on as a late substitute for Joe Cole. Subsequent loan spells with Leyton Orient and Exeter City and a return to Kingstonian failed to reignite his career and he was released by West Ham in 2001. After a trial he had impressed manager Lawrie Sanchez and was signed by Wycombe Wanderers and played there for three seasons until he was released by new Wycombe manager Tony Adams. He also had spells with Crawley Town, Hornchurch, and Havant & Waterlooville.

== Music career ==
In 2006 a severe thigh injury ended Holligan's football career and he moved into the music industry. He is an autodidact pianist, session musician, singer-songwriter, producer and entrepreneur.
