= 1994–95 FA Trophy =

FA Challenge Trophy

Tournament details
- Country: England; Wales
- Teams: 180

Final positions
- Champions: Woking
- Runners-up: Kidderminster Harriers

The 1994–95 FA Trophy was the twenty-sixth season of the FA Trophy.

== Preliminary round ==
The matches (no including replays) were played on September 3, 1994.

=== Ties ===
Tie	Home team	Score	Away team
1	Chester-Le-Street Town	2-4	Tow Law Town
2	Fisher	1-1	Whyteleafe
3	Poole Town	1-2	Havant Town

=== Replays ===
Tie	Home team	Score	Away team
2	Whyteleafe	1-0	Fisher

== First qualifying round ==
The matches (no including replays) were played on September 17, 1994.

=== Ties ===
Tie	Home team	Score	Away team
1	Abingdon Town	1-1	Witney Town
2	Accrington Stanley	1-0	Emley
3	Alfreton Town	2-4	Bedworth United
4	Armitage '90	1-4	Curzon Ashton
5	Ashford Town (Kent)	3-4	Bognor Regis Town
6	Aylesbury United	5-0	Barking
7	Bedlington Terriers	2-1	Peterlee Newtown
8	Berkhamsted Town	0-2	Boreham Wood
9	Bridgnorth Town	2-0	Sutton Coldfield Town
10	Burton Albion	1-1	Ashton United
11	Cambridge City	6-1	Bishop's Stortford
12	Chertsey Town	3-1	Tonbridge Angels
13	Chorley	2-0	Bilston Town
14	Clevedon Town	1-1	Bashley
15	Consett	0-0	R T M Newcastle
16	Dorchester Town	2-0	Wokingham Town
17	Dulwich Hamlet	3-1	Dorking
18	Dunston Federation Brewery	2-0	Netherfield
19	Erith & Belvedere	0-1	Staines Town
20	Evesham United	0-1	Basingstoke Town
21	Farsley Celtic	1-1	Droylsden
22	Fleetwood	3-0	Radcliffe Borough
23	Gloucester City	1-0	Weymouth
24	Goole Town	1-1	Knowsley United
25	Gresley Rovers	3-1	Congleton Town
26	Guisborough Town	2-0	Murton
27	Harrogate Town	4-0	Eppleton Colliery Welfare
28	Hastings Town	0-2	Gravesend & Northfleet
29	Havant Town	3-0	Waterlooville
30	Hayes	1-0	Tamworth
31	Hebburn	2-1	Prudhoe Town
32	Heybridge Swifts	2-0	Billericay Town
33	Hinckley Town	3-3	Ilkeston Town
34	Horwich R M I	0-3	Nuneaton Borough
35	King's Lynn	3-3	Burnham
36	Leicester United	2-2	Caernarfon Town
37	Leyton	0-1	Purfleet
38	Maidenhead United	0-1	Fareham Town
39	Margate	0-2	Yeading
40	Matlock Town	2-1	Buxton
41	Molesey	1-0	Sittingbourne
42	Moor Green	8-4	Worksop Town
43	Mossley	2-2	Dudley Town
44	Newbury Town	0-0	Buckingham Town
45	Newport A F C	1-3	Aldershot Town
46	Newport I O W	2-4	Salisbury City
47	Racing Club Warwick	1-3	Harrow Borough (Declared void)
47	Racing Club Warwick	2-5	Harrow Borough
48	Redditch United	0-1	Eastwood Town
49	Ruislip Manor	0-3	Baldock Town
50	Rushden & Diamonds	0-0	Hendon
51	Solihull Borough	1-0	Atherton Laburnum Rovers
52	Stourbridge	3-6	Gainsborough Trinity
53	Sudbury Town	5-0	Corby Town
54	Tooting & Mitcham United	0-2	Walton & Hersham
55	Tow Law Town	2-3	Lancaster City
56	V S Rugby	4-3	Braintree Town
57	Wealdstone	3-0	Bromley
58	Wembley	5-2	Bury Town
59	West Auckland Town	5-0	Shildon
60	Whitley Bay	0-4	Bamber Bridge
61	Whyteleafe	1-2	Uxbridge
62	Wivenhoe Town	1-2	Rothwell Town
63	Workington	2-2	Great Harwood Town
64	Yate Town	0-2	Forest Green Rovers

=== Replays ===
Tie	Home team	Score	Away team
1	Witney Town	1-0	Abingdon Town
10	Ashton United	3-0	Burton Albion
14	Bashley	1-0	Clevedon Town
15	R T M Newcastle	2-0	Consett
21	Droylsden	6-3	Farsley Celtic
24	Knowsley United	6-2	Goole Town
33	Ilkeston Town	1-0	Hinckley Town
35	Burnham	2-0	King's Lynn
36	Caernarfon Town	1-2	Leicester United
43	Dudley Town	4-5	Mossley
44	Buckingham Town	1-1	Newbury Town
51	Hendon	1-4	Rushden & Diamonds
64	Great Harwood Town	4-2	Workington

=== 2nd replays ===
Tie	Home team	Score	Away team
44	Buckingham Town	0-2	Newbury Town

== Second qualifying round ==
The matches (no including replays) were played on October 15, 1994.

=== Ties ===
Tie	Home team	Score	Away team
1	Accrington Stanley	2-2	West Auckland Town
2	Baldock Town	2-0	Matlock Town
3	Basingstoke Town	0-1	Aldershot Town
4	Bedworth United	2-0	Bridgnorth Town
5	Boreham Wood	1-1	Uxbridge
6	Chorley	1-2	Bamber Bridge
7	Curzon Ashton	4-2	Harrogate Town
8	Droylsden	2-2	Hebburn
9	Dulwich Hamlet	1-2	Aylesbury United
10	Forest Green Rovers	1-1	Newbury Town
11	Gainsborough Trinity	1-1	Gresley Rovers
12	Gloucester City	3-0	Fareham Town
13	Gravesend & Northfleet	1-1	Harrow Borough
14	Great Harwood Town	1-2	Fleetwood
15	Guisborough Town	2-1	Bedlington Terriers
16	Havant Town	1-3	Dorchester Town
17	Heybridge Swifts	1-1	Chertsey Town
18	Ilkeston Town	6-1	Leicester United
19	Lancaster City	1-1	Knowsley United
20	Molesey	4-2	Staines Town
21	Mossley	1-3	Moor Green
22	Nuneaton Borough	1-2	Ashton United
23	R T M Newcastle	0-2	Dunston Federation Brewery
24	Rothwell Town	5-4	Eastwood Town
25	Rushden & Diamonds	2-1	Wembley
26	Salisbury City	0-0	Bognor Regis Town
27	Solihull Borough	0-1	V S Rugby
28	Sudbury Town	2-0	Hayes
29	Walton & Hersham	2-1	Cambridge City
30	Wealdstone	0-3	Purfleet
31	Witney Town	1-2	Bashley
32	Yeading	0-0	Burnham

=== Replays ===
Tie	Home team	Score	Away team
1	West Auckland Town	3-1	Accrington Stanley
5	Uxbridge	1-2	Boreham Wood
8	Hebburn	0-4	Droylsden
10	Newbury Town	2-1	Forest Green Rovers
11	Gresley Rovers	1-0	Gainsborough Trinity
13	Harrow Borough	5-1	Gravesend & Northfleet
17	Chertsey Town	3-1	Heybridge Swifts
19	Knowsley United	2-1	Lancaster City
26	Bognor Regis Town	4-2	Salisbury City
32	Burnham	0-4	Yeading

== Third qualifying round ==
The matches (no including replays) were played on November 26, 1994.

=== Ties ===
Tie	Home team	Score	Away team
1	Aldershot Town	1-1	Rothwell Town (Tie awarded to Rothwell Town)
2	Atherstone United	1-2	Newbury Town
3	Aylesbury United	2-1	Dorchester Town
4	Baldock Town	1-1	Walton & Hersham
5	Bamber Bridge	3-1	Grantham Town
6	Barrow	1-1	Winsford United
7	Bashley	1-1	Yeading
8	Bedworth United	0-1	Boreham Wood
9	Cheltenham Town	4-0	Worthing
10	Curzon Ashton	0-1	Gresley Rovers
11	Droylsden	0-1	Leek Town
12	Dunston Federation Brewery	2-3	Ilkeston Town
13	Fleetwood	1-1	Spennymoor United
14	Frickley Athletic	1-2	Whitby Town
15	Gloucester City	0-2	Chelmsford City
16	Grays Athletic	0-0	Chertsey Town
17	Gretna	2-1	Seaham Red Star
18	Guisborough Town	1-2	West Auckland Town
19	Halesowen Town	4-0	Hitchin Town
20	Hednesford Town	2-1	Trowbridge Town
21	Hyde United	1-0	Boston United
22	Kingstonian	3-1	Harrow Borough
23	Knowsley United	1-4	Ashton United
24	Moor Green	0-0	Marlow
25	Northallerton	0-2	Blyth Spartans
26	Rushden & Diamonds	2-1	Crawley Town
27	St Albans City	4-3	Purfleet
28	Sudbury Town	6-1	Carshalton Athletic
29	V S Rugby	2-1	Bognor Regis Town
30	Warrington Town	1-1	Colwyn Bay
31	Weston Super Mare	1-3	Chesham United
32	Worcester City	2-2	Molesey

=== Replays ===
Tie	Home team	Score	Away team
4	Walton & Hersham	2-1	Baldock Town
6	Winsford United	4-2	Barrow
7	Yeading	1-0	Bashley
13	Spennymoor United	3-0	Fleetwood
16	Chertsey Town	1-1	Grays Athletic
24	Marlow	1-0	Moor Green
30	Colwyn Bay	3-0	Warrington Town
32	Molesey	2-0	Worcester City

=== 2nd replay ===
Tie	Home team	Score	Away team
16	Grays Athletic	3-1	Chertsey Town

== 1st round ==
The teams that given byes to this round are Woking, Kidderminster Harriers, Kettering Town, Southport, Runcorn, Dagenham & Redbridge, Macclesfield Town, Dover Athletic, Stafford Rangers, Altrincham, Gateshead, Bath City, Halifax Town, Stalybridge Celtic, Northwich Victoria, Welling United, Telford United, Bromsgrove Rovers, Yeovil Town, Merthyr Tydfil, Farnborough Town, Stevenage Borough, Slough Town, Witton Albion, Marine, Morecambe, Sutton United, Bishop Auckland, Guiseley, Enfield, Durham City and Billingham Synthonia. The matches (no including replays) were played on January 21, 1995.

=== Ties ===
Tie	Home team	Score	Away team
1	Bamber Bridge	1-0	Halifax Town
2	Billingham Synthonia	1-2	Ashton United
3	Bishop Auckland	0-1	Gateshead
4	Boreham Wood	1-0	Grays Athletic
5	Bromsgrove Rovers	1-3	Enfield
6	Chelmsford City	2-4	Yeovil Town
7	Colwyn Bay	1-1	Blyth Spartans
8	Farnborough Town	1-0	Dover Athletic
9	Gresley Rovers	2-0	Stafford Rangers
10	Gretna	1-1	Halesowen Town
11	Hednesford Town	1-2	Altrincham
12	Ilkeston Town	4-2	Winsford United
13	Kingstonian	3-2	Yeading
14	Leek Town	2-1	Durham City
15	Marine	3-1	Whitby Town
16	Merthyr Tydfil	3-2	Slough Town
17	Molesey	0-1	Cheltenham Town
18	Newbury Town	1-2	Rothwell Town
19	Runcorn	2-1	Northwich Victoria
20	Rushden & Diamonds	3-1	Sudbury Town
21	Spennymoor United	0-3	Morecambe
22	St Albans City	2-3	Kidderminster Harriers
23	Stalybridge Celtic	3-3	Hyde United
24	Stevenage Borough	2-1	Dagenham & Redbridge
25	Sutton United	1-1	Bath City
26	Telford United	2-0	Southport
27	V S Rugby	2-1	Aylesbury United
28	Walton & Hersham	2-2	Kettering Town
29	Welling United	2-2	Marlow
30	West Auckland Town	1-2	Macclesfield Town
31	Witton Albion	0-0	Guiseley
32	Woking	3-0	Chesham United

=== Replays ===
Tie	Home team	Score	Away team
7	Blyth Spartans	2-2	Colwyn Bay
10	Halesowen Town	4-1	Gretna
23	Hyde United	3-1	Stalybridge Celtic
25	Bath City	1-0	Sutton United
28	Kettering Town	1-0	Walton & Hersham
29	Marlow	1-5	Welling United
31	Guiseley	2-2	Witton Albion

=== 2nd replays ===
Tie	Home team	Score	Away team
7	Colwyn Bay	2-1	Blyth Spartans
31	Witton Albion	1-2	Guiseley

== 2nd round ==
The matches (no including replays) were played on February 11, 1995.

=== Ties ===
Tie	Home team	Score	Away team
1	Altrincham	1-1	V S Rugby
2	Ashton United	0-5	Macclesfield Town
3	Bath City	1-2	Marine
4	Boreham Wood	2-1	Kettering Town
5	Colwyn Bay	1-2	Enfield
6	Farnborough Town	0-1	Rushden & Diamonds
7	Gateshead	6-1	Rothwell Town
8	Gresley Rovers	2-3	Morecambe
9	Halesowen Town	2-1	Guiseley
10	Hyde United	2-0	Telford United
11	Kingstonian	0-0	Kidderminster Harriers
12	Merthyr Tydfil	2-1	Bamber Bridge
13	Runcorn	4-2	Leek Town
14	Welling United	1-1	Ilkeston Town
15	Woking	3-1	Cheltenham Town
16	Yeovil Town	1-1	Stevenage Borough

=== Replays ===
Tie	Home team	Score	Away team
1	V S Rugby	1-2	Altrincham
11	Kidderminster Harriers	1-0	Kingstonian
14	Ilkeston Town	3-0	Welling United
16	Stevenage Borough	2-0	Yeovil Town

== 3rd round ==
The matches (no including replays) were played on March 4, 1995.

=== Ties ===
Tie	Home team	Score	Away team
1	Enfield	1-1	Merthyr Tydfil
2	Gateshead	0-1	Macclesfield Town
3	Ilkeston Town	2-2	Kidderminster Harriers
4	Marine	2-0	Boreham Wood
5	Morecambe	2-3	Altrincham
6	Runcorn	0-0	Hyde United
7	Rushden & Diamonds	6-1	Halesowen Town
8	Stevenage Borough	0-3	Woking

=== Replays ===
Tie	Home team	Score	Away team
1	Merthyr Tydfil	0-1	Enfield
3	Kidderminster Harriers	2-1	Ilkeston Town
6	Hyde United	4-0	Runcorn

== 4th round ==
The matches (no including replays) were played on March 25, 1995.

=== Ties ===
Tie	Home team	Score	Away team
1	Enfield	1-1	Rushden & Diamonds
2	Kidderminster Harriers	5-0	Altrincham
3	Macclesfield Town	0-1	Woking
4	Marine	1-3	Hyde United

=== Replays ===
Tie	Home team	Score	Away team
1	Rushden & Diamonds	4-3	Enfield

== Semi finals ==
The first legs were played on April 8, 1995, and the second legs the next week later (April 15).

=== First leg ===
Tie	Home team	Score	Away team
1	Kidderminster Harriers	2-0	Hyde United
2	Rushden & Diamonds	1-0	Woking

=== Second leg ===
Tie	Home team	Score	Away team	Aggregate
1	Hyde United	1-0	Kidderminster Harriers	2-1
2	Woking	2-0	Rushden & Diamonds	2-1

== Final ==
The match was played on May 14, 1995, at Wembley Stadium.

=== Tie ===
Home team	Score	Away team
Woking	2-1	Kidderminster Harriers
