= Marvin Farrell =

English born-Montserratian footballer

Personal information
- Date of birth: 16 May 1990 (age 36)
- Place of birth: Camborne, Cornwall, England
- Position: Defender

Youth career
- 2004–2006: Crystal Palace
- 2006–2008: Staines Town

Senior career*
Years	Team	Apps	(Gls)
2008–2009	Staines Town		
2009–2010	Eastbourne Borough		
2010–2011	Dorking		
2011	Walton Casuals	6	(0)
2012	North Greenford United		
2012–2013	Tooting & Mitcham United		
2013	Redbridge		
2013–2014	Crawley Down Gatwick		
2014	Walton & Hersham		
2014	→ East Preston (loan)		
2015	East Grinstead Town		
2015	Farnborough		
2015	Beckenham Town	3	(0)
2018–	Lewisham Borough		

International career^{‡}
2015–2018	Montserrat	3	(0)
- * Club domestic league appearances and goals as of 07:30, 24 May 2015 (UTC) ‡ National team caps and goals as of 21:10, 11 September 2019 (UTC)

Marvin Farrell (born 16 May 1990) is an English born-Montserratian footballer who last played as a defender for Lewisham Borough.

== Career ==
=== Semi-professional career ===
Farrell started his career in the Crystal Palace academy, joining at the age of 14. He then joined the Staines Town youth ranks three years later, being crowned Isthmian Premier Division champions and named as the club's Reserve Player of the Year in 2009. After three years at the club, he joined Eastbourne Borough ahead of the 2010–11 season.

He then joined Dorking in February 2010, and featured for the club until the remainder of the season. Farrell moved to Isthmian Division One South side Walton Casuals in September 2011, and made six appearances for the Stags. He left the club in October 2011, with Mick Sullivan newly appointed as manager.

However, he was reunited with former manager Neil Shipperley at North Greenford United, making his debut in a 6–1 defeat to AFC Totton on 14 February 2012. He soon returned to the Isthmian Division One South to join Tooting & Mitcham United, where he featured alongside Montserratian goalkeeper Nic Taylor in a 3-0 friendly defeat to Fulham U21s. He was released by the Terrors in January 2013.

Farrell joined Redbridge in March 2013, where he made eight appearances as a striker. Joining Crawley Down Gatwick in August 2013, he returned to his defensive role while becoming a regular in the first team.

Farrell started the 2014–15 season with Walton & Hersham, before dual registering with East Preston in November 2014. He switched Stompond Lane for East Court in February 2015, joining East Grinstead Town before a spell with Farnborough.

He made three appearances for Beckenham Town during the 2015–16 season.

He joined Lewisham Borough in the summer of 2018.

=== International career ===
Farrell made his international debut for Montserrat on 27 March 2015, featuring in a 2–1 defeat to Curaçao in 2018 World Cup qualification. He gained his second international cap three days later, featuring in a 2–2 draw with Curaçao.
