= Mitchel Bergkamp =

Dutch footballer (born 1998)

Personal information
- Full name: Mitchel Dennis Bergkamp
- Date of birth: 10 September 1998 (age 28)
- Place of birth: Netherlands
- Position: Midfielder

Team information
- Current team: Walton & Hersham
- Number: 20

Youth career
- Almere City
- 2021: Watford

Senior career*
Years	Team	Apps	(Gls)
2017–2020	Jong Almere City	48	(7)
2021	Watford	0	(0)
2023–2024	Bromley	10	(1)
2024	Welling United	3	(0)
2026–	Walton & Hersham	3	(0)
- * Club domestic league appearances and goals as of 09:44, 7 October 2026 (UTC)

Mitchel Dennis Bergkamp (born 10 September 1998) is a Dutch footballer who plays as a midfielder for National League South club Walton & Hersham.

== Career ==
Bergkamp started his career with Dutch fourth tier side Jong Almere City, helping them earn promotion to the Dutch third tier. In 2020, he trialed for the youth academy of Arsenal in the English Premier League.

Before the second half of 2020–21, Bergkamp joined the youth academy of English second-tier club Watford. In January 2023, he signed for Bromley in England.

On 31 May 2024, it was confirmed that Bergkamp would leave Bromley following the expiration of his contract. In October 2024, he joined National League South side Welling United. He departed the club in December 2024.

On 15 August 2026, Bergkamp joined National League South club Walton & Hersham.

== Personal life ==
He is the son of Netherlands international Dennis Bergkamp.
