= Walton & Hersham F.C. =

Association football club in England

Coordinates: 51°23′57.851″N 0°24′44.122″W

Walton & Hersham
- Full name: Walton & Hersham Football Club
- Nicknames: The Swans; The Sham; The Waltz
- Founded: 1945; 81 years ago
- Ground: Elmbridge Xcel Sports Hub; Walton-on-Thames, Surrey
- Capacity: 2,097 (318 seated)
- Chairman: Christopher Corey
- Manager: Vacant
- League: National League South
- 2025–26: Southern League Premier Division South, 1st of 22 (promoted)
- Website: Official website
| Home colours | Away colours |

Walton & Hersham Football Club is a semi-professional football club based in Walton-on-Thames, Surrey. Founded in 1945 following the amalgamation of Walton FC and Hersham FC, they will play in the National League South, the sixth tier of English football in the 2026/27 season following promotion from the Southern League Premier South. The club is affiliated to the Surrey County Football Association.

The club joined the Corinthian League upon formation, and after a difficult first season won three consecutive league titles. In 1950, the club moved to the Athenian League, and were later placed in the Premier Division upon expansion in 1963. Walton & Hersham were named league champions for a fourth time during the 1968–69 season, and shortly after joined the Isthmian League. The club's most successful period soon followed, which saw them reach the FA Cup Second Round and win the FA Amateur Cup at Wembley Stadium, although the departure of manager Allen Batsford and several players to Wimbledon saw the club quickly relegated to the Isthmian League Division Two.

After coming close to extinction in the late 1970s, former Ballon d'Or winner Sir Stanley Matthews was briefly named as president and the club later managed to find consistency throughout the 1980s. The Swans regularly earned promotion and suffered relegation between the Isthmian League divisions throughout the next decades, and named Millwall chairman Theo Paphitis as a board member for several years. Following the 2015–16 season, the club suffered relegation to the Combined Counties Premier Division and began to struggle once again.

In August 2017, Walton & Hersham left Stompond Lane and moved into the Elmbridge Sports Hub – a £20 million sports complex development shared with local rivals Walton Casuals. After three seasons in the ninth tier of English football, the club suffered further relegation to the Combined Counties Division One and long-term owner Alan Smith stepped down from his position. In July 2019, the club was taken over by a group of students, who claim to be the youngest owners in world football.

Walton & Hersham are the inspiration behind the name of punk band Sham 69, which was derived from a piece of graffiti reading 'Walton & Hersham 69'.

== History ==
=== 1945–1963 ===
Discussions of the amalgamation of local rivals Walton FC and Hersham FC took place as early as 1912, but the idea was rejected by membership vote. A second vote took place 11 years later, but with a tied decision the club remained separate, and the idea was once again rejected in 1933. However, when Hersham FC no longer had a home ground in 1945, the two clubs met again and came to an agreement to join the newly founded Corinthian League as one club.

Despite a poor first season, Walton & Hersham won the league three consecutive times from 1946 to 1949. They also won the Surrey Senior Cup for the first time during the 1947–48 season with a 2–1 win against Kingstonian at Crystal Palace. In 1950, the club were elected to the Athenian League and finished runners up in their debut season while also winning their second Surrey Senior Cup.

Walton & Hersham reached the FA Amateur Cup semi-finals in both the 1951–52 and 1952–53 seasons, and during this period gained a substantial following. The club reached the FA Cup First Round for the first time in 1957–58, losing 6–1 to Southampton in front of 6,000 people. They won the Surrey Senior Cup for a third time in 1960–61, and retained the trophy the following year.

=== 1963–1994 ===
The Athenian League expanded in 1963 and Walton & Hersham were placed in the Premier Division. A period of mid-table football followed, until the 1967 appointment of Allen Batsford as manager heralded a new era of success. In 1968–69, he won the Athenian League, followed by two successive visits to the FA Cup first round in 1969–70 and 1970–71. The Surrey Senior Cup was won again in 1970–71.

Walton & Hersham were elected to the Isthmian League in 1971, and the 1972–73 season proved statistically their greatest ever. They won the Surrey Senior Cup, finished as runners-up in the league, reached the FA Cup second round for the first time and, most prestigiously, won the FA Amateur Cup, defeating Slough Town at Wembley Stadium. They set a unique record by winning the competition without conceding a goal. Players including Dave Bassett, Willie Smith and Roger Connell became regulars in the England amateur international team. As FA Amateur Cup Winners they were invited to compete in the 1973 Final of The Coppa Ottorino Barassi (The Barassi Cup). They played Jesolo the Italian Amamtuer Cup Winners. The Swans won both legs 4–0 at home and 2-0 Away to lift the trophy. In 1973–74, the club reached the FA Cup second round again, having beaten Brian Clough's Brighton & Hove Albion at Goldstone Ground 4–0. Following the defeat, Clough almost got into a fight with comedian Eric Sykes, who was associated with Walton & Hersham at the time and was laughing about the result to a friend during a phone call.

In 1974, Batsford left to manage Wimbledon and took several players with him. Walton & Hersham were relegated in 1975 and, although they reached the FA Cup first round again in the 1975–76 season, they went close to extinction in the late 1970s. They inspired the name of punk band Sham 69 (who formed in 1976), as they derived it from a piece of graffiti which read 'Walton & Hersham 69'. Despite briefly having Sir Stanley Matthews as president, the club endured a lean period throughout the 1980s.

=== 1994–2018 ===
Walton & Hersham were promoted to the Isthmian top flight in 1994, and reached the FA Cup first round again that season, although relegation followed in 1996. They were promoted the following year, but relegation followed again in 2000. After a spell in the Isthmian League First Division, they appointed long-serving player Alan Dowson as manager and he led them to a successful 2004–05 season, with promotion secured as runners-up.

After the resignation of Alan Dowson in October 2006, former Gillingham first-team coach Bobby Paterson took over after a long search for a new manager. Walton & Hersham were relegated that season and Paterson's contract was terminated. The assistant manager Les Cleevely - the former Carshalton Athletic player/assistant manager for whom he made over 500 appearances - took over.

Former Millwall chairman Theo Paphitis became a member of Walton & Hersham's board of directors, and after a mid-table finish to the 2007–08 season, Les Cleevely became the academy coach while Jimmy Bolton took over as manager. In March 2009, Jimmy Bolton was replaced for the rest of the season by Matt Elverson as caretaker manager. During the 2009 off-season, John Crumplin was appointed manager, although his reign only lasted until September 2010. Chuck Martini was appointed soon after.

At the end of the 2015–16 season, Walton & Hersham were relegated to the Combined Counties Football League Premier Division. The club appointed Simon Haughney as first team manager on 22 June 2016, with former Guyana international Howard Newton as assistant manager.

=== 2019–2024 ===
In June 2019 - after a season ending in relegation to the Combined Counties League One - the club was taken over by a consortium of seven young people; Thomas Bradbury, Reme Edetanlen, Jack Newton, Sartej Tucker, Ben Madelin, Calogero Scannella and Stephan Karidis. They got off to a winning start in the league with a 3–0 victory over Eversley & California FC.

Media coverage has been a prominent strategy for the new ownership, with national & international coverage documenting the club's direction as the unverified "youngest owners in world football". The new directors also featured in a 90min documentary that recorded their experiences, filmed during their first season in charge.

On 14 April 2020, Manager George Busumbru stepped down, citing 'personal reasons'. Scott Harris, former player & former assistant coach at Walton Casuals, replaced George.

In 2021, the club were promoted to the Premier Division South based on their results in the abandoned 2019–20 and 2020–21 seasons. After six years away from the Isthmian League, a 1–0 victory over Raynes Park Vale on 9 April 2022 secured at least a second placed spot and back-to-back promotions. The club returned to Step 4 for the first time since relegation in 15/16.

In 2023, after finishing 2nd in the Isthmian South Central Division, the club secured a third successive promotion following a 3–1 win in the division play-off finals against Hanworth Villa, which returns the club to Step 3, a key goal for the owners. The season saw other records with striker Eddie Simon scoring an English record of four hat-tricks in successive games.

In April 2024, following three promotions in three seasons, Harris was sacked with the club sitting five points off of the play-offs with three matches remaining, with a number of key players also departing the club in support of Harris.

=== 2025-present ===
Harris was replaced as manager by his former assistant Billy Rowley, who led the Swans to a third place league finish and their first Surrey Senior Cup title in 52 years. A penalty shootout defeat to Gloucester City in the play-off semi-final denied them a chance at promotion to the National League South.

In November 2025, Rowley and assistant manager Darren Simpson departed the club for Yeovil Town.

Coaching assistant Jakub Pietrzak took charge on an interim basis and was appointed as permanent manager after overseeing three wins and one draw.

Pietrzak led the club to the fifth round of the FA Trophy, its best ever performance and on 6 April 2026, the Swans were crowned champions of the Southern League Premier South to earn promotion to the National League South for the first time in its history.

== Stadium ==
Walton & Hersham play their home games at the Elmbridge Sports Hub, Waterside Drive, Walton-on-Thames, Surrey, KT12 2JP.

The club moved into the stadium for the 2017–18 season following a two-year, £20 million redevelopment on the site of the former Waterside Stadium. The stadium was shared with Walton Casuals until they folded, as well as the local athletics club with an eight-lane Olympic standard athletics track located behind the main stand and clubhouse of the football stadium.

The club have spent much of their history at Stompond Lane, where they began playing upon formation in 1945. The Swans notably hosted Southampton in a 6–1 defeat in the 1957–58 FA Cup First Round and earned a 0–0 draw against Brighton & Hove Albion in the 1973–74 FA Cup edition. In 2017, the stadium was demolished to make way for new housing developments as the club moved across town.

== Players and staff ==
=== Current squad ===
As of 20 November 2026

Note: Flags indicate national team as defined under FIFA eligibility rules; some limited exceptions apply. Players may hold more than one non-FIFA nationality.

| No. | Pos. | Nation | Player |
|---|---|---|---|
| 1 | GK | ENG | Tommy Reid |
| 3 | DF | ENG | Kai Woollard-Innocent |
| 5 | DF | ENG | Sam German |
| 6 | MF | ARU | Rovien Ostiana |
| 7 | MF | LTU | Matas Škarna |
| 8 | DF | ENG | Joe Bennett |
| 9 | FW | ENG | Makise Evans (on loan from Colchester United) |
| 18 | FW | ENG | Junior Dixon |
| 19 | DF | ENG | Archy Taylor |
| 20 | MF | NED | Mitchel Bergkamp |
| 21 | MF | ENG | Hassan Ibrahiym |

| No. | Pos. | Nation | Player |
|---|---|---|---|
| 23 | MF | ENG | Ikechi Eze |
| 24 | DF | ENG | Laurence Ernest |
| 25 | GK | ENG | Dillon Addai (on loan from Bromley) |
| 26 | FW | ENG | Josh Ayres (on loan from Woking) |
| 27 | MF | BRA | Kleyton Junior |
| 28 | MF | ENG | Bayley Brown |
| 30 | MF | ENG | Koko Koleni |
| 33 | DF | ENG | Charlie Wiggett |
| 34 | DF | ENG | Josh Emmanuel |
| 37 | DF | ENG | Paul Osew |
| — | MF | ENG | Klaudio Krasniqi (on loan from Crawley Town) |

=== Coaching staff ===
As of 2 October 2026.

| Position | Name |
|---|---|
| Manager | Vacant |
| Director of Football | Neal Ardley |
| First Team Analyst | Luke Doshi Keeble |
| Goalkeeper Coaches | Nicolai Collins |
| Goalkeeper Coaches | Cameron Kennedy |
| Kitman | Sam Chapman |
| Lead Sports Therapist | Bruno Silva |
| Physiotherapist | Matilda Cawte |

== Achievements ==
- League
  - Southern Football League
    - Premier Division South
      - Winners: 2025–26
  - Athenian League
    - Winners: 1968–69
    - Runners-up (3): 1950–51, 1969–70, 1970–71
  - Corinthian League
    - Winners (3): 1946–47, 1947–48, 1948–49
    - Runners-up: 1949–50
  - Isthmian League
    - Runners-up: 1972–73
    - Division One
      - Runners-up: 2004–05
      - Third place (2): 1993–94, 1996–97
    - South Central Division
      - Runners-up: 2022–23
  - Combined Counties Football League
    - Premier Division South
      - Runners Up: 2021-22
    - Division One
      - Runners Up: 2020-21

- Cup
  - FA Amateur Cup
    - Winners: 1972–73
  - Barassi Cup
    - Winners: 1973–74
  - CCL Premier Challenge Cup
    - Winners: 2021-22
  - London Senior Cup
    - Runners-up: 1973–74
  - Surrey Senior Cup
    - Winners (7): 1947–48, 1950–51, 1960–61, 1961–62, 1970–71, 1972–73, 2024–25
    - Runners-up (6): 1951–52, 1959–60, 1969–70, 1971–72, 1973–74, 2004–05

== Records ==
=== Matches ===
- First competitive match: Epsom Town 7–1 Walton & Hersham, Corinthian League, 1 September 1945
- First FA Cup match: Walton & Hersham 11–0 Epsom Town, First Qualifying Round, 22 September 1945
- First FA Amateur Cup match: Walton & Hersham 6–0 Stoke Recreation, Second Qualifying Round, 13 October 1945
- First Surrey Senior Cup match: Walton & Hersham 2–3 Tooting & Mitcham United, First Round, 1 December 1945
- First London Senior Cup match: Walton & Hersham 1–0 Leatherhead, First Qualifying Round, 22 September 1973
- First FA Trophy match: Tooting & Mitcham United 3–0 Walton & Hersham, Third Qualifying Round, 30 November 1974
- First Barassi Cup match: Walton & Hersham 4–0 AC Jesolo, First Leg, 18 October 1973
- First Isthmian League Cup match: Walton & Hersham 3–4 Chesham United, First Round, 9 March 1976
- First Full Members' Cup match: Staines Town 1–5 Walton & Hersham, First Round, 18 December 1990
- First FA Vase match: Frimley Green 0–3 Walton & Hersham, Second Qualifying Round, 24 September 2016
- First Combined Counties Premier Challenge Cup match: Walton & Hersham 5–1 Eversley & California, Second Round, 1 November 2016
- Record attendance: 10,000 (v Crook Town, FA Amateur Cup Fourth round, 1955)

=== Results ===
- Record win:
  - 11–0 v Epsom Town, FA Cup First Qualifying Round, 22 September 1945
  - 11–0 v Redhill, FA Amateur Cup Fourth qualifying round, 10 November 1945
  - 11–0 v Guildford, FA Cup Preliminary Round, 21 September 1946
- Record defeat:
  - 0–7 v Farnborough Town, Isthmian League Division One, 18 September 1984
  - 0–7 v Kingstonian, Isthmian League Premier Division, 14 March 1998
  - 0–7 v Chelmsford City, Isthmian League Premier Division, 17 February 2007
  - 1–8 v Dagenham, Isthmian League Division One, 21 December 1974
  - 1–8 v Kingstonian, Surrey Senior Cup first round, 1 January 1990
  - 2–9 v Enfield, Athenian League, 13 February 1960
  - 2–9 v Bromley, FA Cup Fourth qualifying round, 6 November 1976
- Highest scoring game:
  - 9–3 v Camberley Town, FA Amateur Cup, 26 October 1946
  - 9–3 v Bedford Avenue, Corinthian League, 19 April 1947
  - 9–3 v Hornchurch & Upminster, Corinthian League, 28 January 1961
  - 11–1 v Twickenham, FA Cup Preliminary Round, 18 September 1948

=== Competitions ===
- Corinthian League best performance: 1st, 1946–47, 1947–48, 1948–49
- Athenian League best performance: 1st – Premier Division, 1968–69
- Isthmian League best performance: 2nd, 1973–74
- Combined Counties League best performance: 2nd – Premier Division South, 2021-22
- FA Amateur Cup best performance: Winners, 1972–73
- FA Cup best performance: Second round, 1972–73, 1973–74
- FA Trophy best performance: Fifth round, 2025–26
- FA Vase best performance: Fourth round, 2020–21
- London Senior Cup best performance: Runners-up, 1973–74
- Surrey Senior Cup best performance: Winners, 1947–48, 1950–51, 1960–61, 1961–62, 1970–71, 1972–73, 2024–25

== Former players ==
1. Players that have played/managed in the football league or any foreign equivalent to this level (i.e. fully professional league).
2. Players with full international caps.
- (England) Timi Alexander
- (England) Doug Allder
- (England) Ed Asafu-Adjaye
- (Antigua and Barbuda) Moses Ashikodi
- (England) Laurience Batty
- (England) Derek Bryan
- (England) Jeff Bryant
- (Bermuda) Casey Castle
- (Republic of Ireland) Tim Clancy
- (England) Jack Cock
- (England) Roger Connell
- (England) Neil Cordice
- (Bulgaria) Ivailo Dimitrov
- (England) Dave Donaldson
- (England) Alan Dowson
- (England) Andy Driscoll
- (England) Billy Edwards
- (England) Nathan Ellington
- (Wales) Sander Smets
- (Montserrat) Marvin Farrell
- (England) Mark Fiore
- (Ghana) Akwasi Fobi-Edusei
- (Dominica) Daniel Francis
- (England) Joe Gadston
- (Republic of Ireland) Abdeen Temitope Abdul
- (England) Alan Gane
- (England) Peter Gelson
- (Argentina) Nick Gindre
- (England) Byron Glasgow
- (England) Michael Gordon
- (England) Alan Hawley
- (England) Garry Haylock
- (England) Mick Heath
- (England) Gavin Holligan
- (England) Joe Howe
- (Barbados) Gus Hurdle
- (England) Gary Johnson
- (England) Francis Joseph
- (England) Calum Kitscha
- (Wales) Gary MacDonald
- (England) Stuart Massey
- (England) Chris McClaren
- (England) Andrew McCulloch
- (England) Mark McLeod
- (England) Alan Morton
- (England) Kieran Murphy
- (England) Mick Murphy
- (England) Jack Neale
- (Guyana) Howard Newton
- (England) Mark Nwokeji
- (France) Roy Odiaka
- (England) Dennis Pacey
- (Dominica) Richard Pacquette
- (England) Steve Parsons
- (England) Mark Peters
- (England) Neil Price
- (England) Paul Priddy
- (England) Bas Savage
- (England) Andy Sayer
- (England) Andre Scarlett
- (Ivory Coast) Claude Stephane Seanla
- (England) Chris Sharpling
- (France) Jean-Michel Sigere
- (England) Paul Smith
- (Wales) Matt Somner
- (England) Tim Soutar
- (England) Aryan Tajbakhsh
- (England) Dave Tarpey
- (England) Richard Teale
- (England) Steve Terry
- (England) Dan Thompson
- (England) Bobby Traynor
- (England) Graham Westley
- (England) Stephen Wilkins
- (Cyprus) Tom Williams
- (England) Bobby Wilson
- (Bangladesh) Zidane Yousuf

== See also ==
- List of Walton & Hersham F.C. seasons
