= Neil Cordice =

English footballer

Personal information
- Full name: Neil Anthony Cordice
- Date of birth: 7 April 1960 (age 66)
- Place of birth: Amersham, England
- Position: Forward

Senior career*
Years	Team	Apps	(Gls)
1977–1978	Wycombe Wanderers	?	(?)
1978–1979	Northampton Town	8	(1)
1979–1987	Wealdstone	?	(59)
1987–1991	Yeovil Town	?	(8)
1991–1993	Wealdstone	?	(?)
1993–1995	Yeovil Town	50	(1)
1995–1996	Walton & Hersham	?	(?)
	Flackwell Heath	?	(?)
	Chesham United	?	(?)
- * Club domestic league appearances and goals

Neil Anthony Cordice (born 7 April 1960) is an English former professional footballer who played in the Football League as a forward.
