= Claude Stephane Seanla =

Ivorian footballer (born 1988)

Claude Seanla
Personal information
- Full name: Claude Stéphane Seanla
- Date of birth: 2 June 1988 (age 38)
- Place of birth: Abidjan, Ivory Coast
- Height: 1.75 m (5 ft 9 in)
- Position: Striker

Youth career
- Tottenham Hotspur

Senior career*
| Years | Team | Apps | (Gls) |
| 2006–2007 | Watford | 0 | (0) |
| 2007 | Kettering Town | 0 | (0) |
| 2007–2008 | Barnet | 3 | (0) |
| 2007 | → St Albans City (loan) | 2 | (0) |
| 2008 | → Wivenhoe Town (loan) | 6 | (0) |
| 2008–2009 | Ashford Town (Kent) | 8 | (5) |
| 2009–2010 | Horsham | 48 | (16) |
| 2010 | Boreham Wood | 12 | (3) |
| 2010–2011 | Tonbridge Angels | 10 | (6) |
| 2011 | Concord Rangers | | |
| 2011 | Crawley Down | | |
| 2011 | Walton & Hersham | | |
| 2011 | Arlesey Town | 4 | (0) |
| 2011–2012 | Aylesbury | 1 | (0) |
| 2012 | Chesham United | 3 | (0) |
| 2012–2013 | Winslow United | | |
| 2013–2014 | Bedford Town | 4 | (0) |
| 2014 | Arlesey Town | 3 | (0) |
| 2014–2015 | Leighton Town | 19 | (4) |
| 2015–2016 | Clean Slate | 6 | (5) |
| 2015 | → New Bradwell St Peter (loan) | 1 | (0) |
| 2017–2018 | Berkhamsted | 0 | (0) |
- * Club domestic league appearances and goals

Claude Stéphane Seanla (born 2 June 1988) is an Ivorian retired footballer who played as a striker.

== Career ==
Seanla was born in Abidjan, Ivory Coast. He started his career at Tottenham Hotspur, and hit 6 goals in 11 starts in an injury hit campaign for Spurs' reserve team in 2005–06, having scored 11 goals in 18 starts the season before.

Seanla signed his first professional forms for Watford in June 2006, following a trial spell. He made his first professional appearance on 19 September 2006, coming on a substitute for Al Bangura for the second half of extra time in the League Cup second round victory over Accrington Stanley.

Seanla left Vicarage Road by mutual consent in February 2007, having made just one appearance for the first team. The following month, he joined Conference North side Kettering Town after impressing for their reserve side, scoring four times in two games. He was released at the end of 2006–07 season following Kettering's failure to win promotion from the Conference North.

On 30 July 2007, he signed for Football League Two side Barnet on a free transfer after a successful trial. On 9 November 2007, he joined St Albans City on a month's loan. In January 2008, Seanla was transfer listed. He struggled when played out of position in midfield, and played only five times for the Bees. In March, he was loaned out to Wivenhoe Town. He failed to make an impression even at this level, however, and shortly after his loan spell was cancelled, he was released by Barnet.

On his debut for Ashford Town, he scored two goals in the second half in a 3–2 loss to Chipstead. He scored five goals in eight games, but was unable to add to that tally due to injury, and joined Horsham in January 2009. Seanla's impressive strike rate for Horsham saw him join promotion hopefuls Boreham Wood in March 2010. He scored the only goal of a play-off semi-final against Aveley F.C. and helped contribute to a play-off final win against Kingstonian to seal promotion for the club.

On his debut for Tonbridge Angels, Seanla scored two goals against AFC Hornchurch in the Angels' 7–1 victory against the Essex team. He later played for Winslow United.

In August 2013, he joined Bedford Town, before joining Leighton Town for the 2014–15 season. He carried on playing the SSML from 2015 onwards, playing for Clean Slate and New Bradwell St Peter. Seanla stated in a June 2018 interview that he had retired from football.
