= Sheku Kamara =

English footballer (born 1987)

Personal information
- Date of birth: 15 November 1987 (age 38)
- Place of birth: Lambeth, London, England
- Position: Right-back

Youth career
- 2003–2006: Charlton Athletic

Senior career*
Years	Team	Apps	(Gls)
2006–2007	Watford	0	(0)
2006–2007	→ Grays Athletic (loan)	4	(0)
2007	Grays Athletic	1	(0)
- * Club domestic league appearances and goals

Sheku Kamara (born 15 November 1987) is an English former professional footballer who played as a right-back. After his football career ended he was imprisoned for his role in an armed robbery.

== Career ==
Having been an apprentice at Charlton Athletic, Kamara signed professional forms for Watford in June 2006 after a trial spell.

Kamara's 2006–07 pre-season was disrupted with a knee injury which it was initially feared would keep him out for the entire season. However the injury was proved to be less serious than originally thought, only keeping him out of action for around a month.

Kamara made his first professional appearance on 19 September 2006, coming on as a second-half substitute for Dominic Blizzard in the League Cup second round victory over Accrington Stanley.

In November 2006 Kamara joined Grays Athletic on a six-week loan deal. He played for the Essex club four times during his time at the club before returning to Watford the following January.

Following a number of trials, Sheku rejoined the Essex outfit on non-contract terms and made his second debut in front of the Setanta Sports cameras against Halifax Town, coming on as a substitute.

== Arrest and sentence ==
On 1 May 2008, Sheku Kamara was sentenced to eight years in jail for his involvement in an armed robbery. He was arrested as part of a gang of criminals who would confront civilians with a gun and ask for their possessions, including mobile phones, wallets and pin numbers.

In passing sentence, the judge described the men's actions as well-planned and intentional banditry of the worst order. He commended the arresting officers for their bravery and the investigating team for the professionalism of their work.

The three men were identified and arrested, in late November 2007, after local police increased patrols and CCTV was monitored in response to a spate of similar robberies in the area during November 2007.

The victims of these robberies were threatened at gunpoint and had credit cards, cash and other valuables stolen. They would then be forced to provide their PIN and one of the robbers would go to a nearby cash machine and withdraw money.

Kamara was charged with five counts of robbery and five counts of possession of a firearm with intent to cause fear of violence. Two firearms believed to have been used in the robberies were also recovered during the investigation, a gas-powered airsoft gun, modelled on a Smith & Wesson pistol and a .177 calibre air pistol.
