= Woking F.C. =

Association football club in England

Woking
- Full name: Woking Football Club
- Nicknames: The Cardinals; The Cards
- Short name: WFC
- Founded: 1887; 139 years ago
- Ground: Kingfield Stadium
- Capacity: 6,036 (2,500 seated) (Note: Capacity currently reduced to 3,000)
- Coordinates: 51°18′23″N 0°33′32″W
- Owner: Todd Johnson
- Chairman: Todd Johnson
- Manager: Craig Ross (interim)
- League: National League
- 2025–26: National League, 10th of 24
- Website: wokingfc.co.uk
Home colours	Away colours

Woking Football Club is a professional association football club, based in Woking, Surrey, England. The team competes in the National League, the fifth level of the English football league system.

Founded in 1887, they joined the Isthmian League in 1911–12 and won the FA Amateur Cup in 1957–58. Woking were relegated twice in 1982–83 and 1984–85. However, they were promoted three times: in 1986–87, 1989–90 and 1991–92, to reach the Football Conference. Woking won the FA Trophy on three occasions during the 1990s (1993–94, 1994–95, 1996–97) and finished as runners-up in the Conference in their third and fourth season at that level but were not promoted. They remained at the highest level of non-League football until relegation in 2008–09. Woking subsequently won promotion back in 2011–12 before suffering another relegation in 2017–18. They earned immediate promotion to the National League via the play-offs in 2019.

The club currently plays its home matches at the Kingfield Stadium and is nicknamed the Cardinals, often shortened to the Cards.

== History ==
=== Early years ===
Woking Football Club was founded in 1887. The club joined the West Surrey League in 1895–96, winning the title by one point. However, within 21 years of being formed, the club was in danger of folding for financial reasons. The turning point came when, in January 1908, Woking played Bolton Wanderers in the first round of the FA Cup, having made it through five qualifying rounds. Despite losing the away game 5–0, the club made it into the national news. Bolton Wanderers, impressed by the minnows they had defeated, travelled to Woking for a friendly match the following season, which kept the club solvent.

=== Isthmian League years ===
In 1911 the club joined the Isthmian League, maintaining their place in the top division for 72 years and finishing as runners-up to Wycombe Wanderers in 1956–57. That achievement was eclipsed the following season when, in front of a 71,000 crowd, Woking beat Ilford 3–0 to win the 1958 F.A. Amateur Cup final, the last to be televised live.

The club then went into decline, culminating in a first-ever relegation in 1982–83. By the end of the 1984–85 season the club had plunged to Division Two South of the Isthmian League. Former player, Geoff Chapple, was appointed as manager on 24 September 1984, but was not able to save the club from relegation. The following season, the club just missed out on promotion at the first attempt. However, the club clinched the Division Two South title in 1986–87 and, after two third-place finishes in Division One, they were promoted back to the Premier Division at the end of the 1989–90 season.

=== FA Cup glory ===
During the 1990–91 season, the club reached the fourth round of the FA Cup. Woking beat three Conference sides to set up a third round away tie at Second Division side West Bromwich Albion. After trailing 1–0 at half time, Woking went on to win 4–2, with Tim Buzaglo scoring a hat-trick. In the Fourth Round, the club was drawn against First Division Everton. The tie was originally going to be played at Woking, however the venue was switched to Everton's home ground, Goodison Park. Woking narrowly lost the match 1–0 to a Kevin Sheedy goal.

=== Promotion to the Conference and FA Trophy success ===
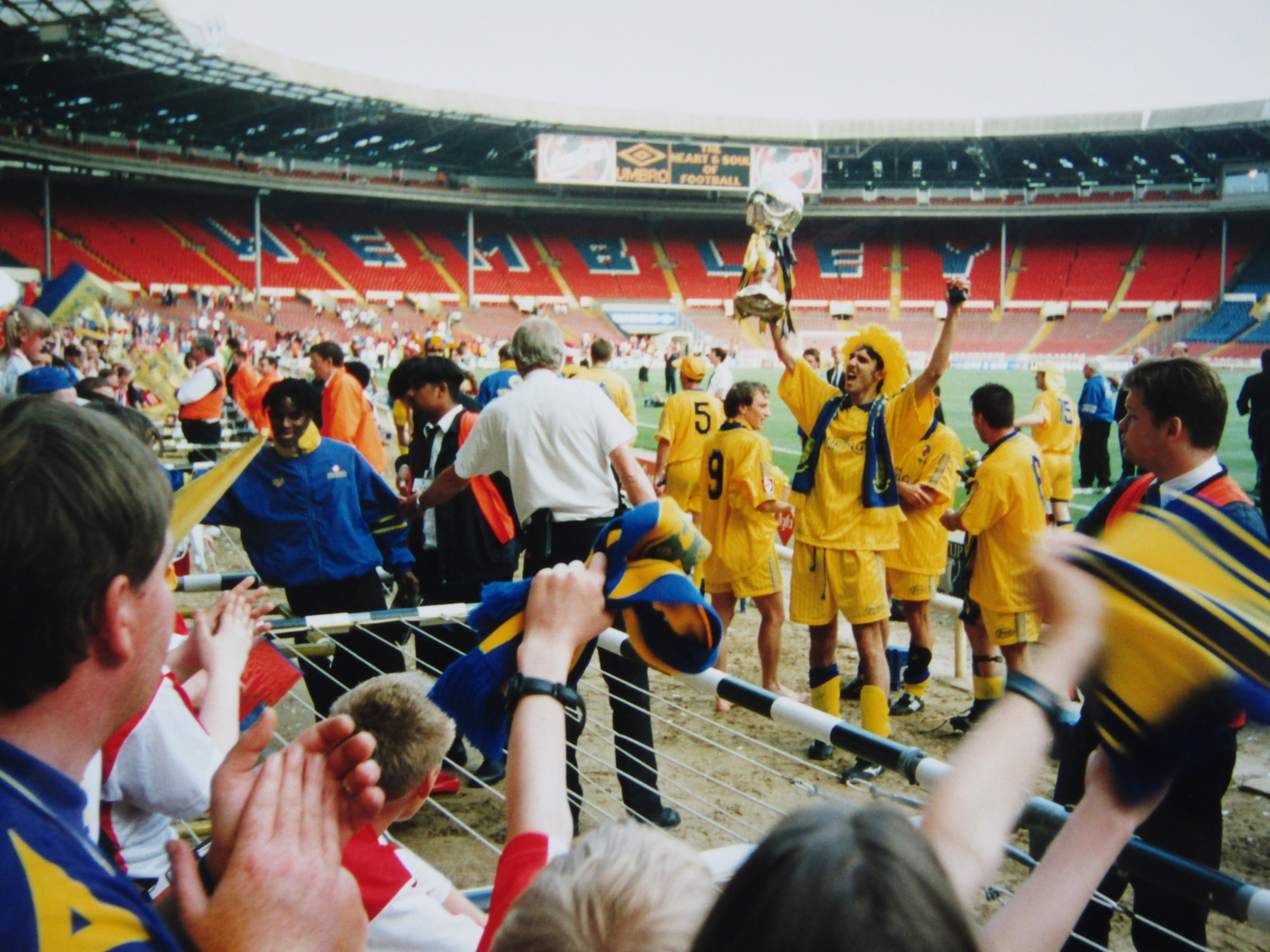
Woking F.C. celebrate winning the 1997 FA Trophy Final.

Promotion to the Conference was achieved in 1991–92. The Isthmian League title was clinched in early April, with seven games still to be played, 18 points clear of nearest rivals, Enfield. The next season saw Woking finish the season in eighth position. The following summer saw Chapple sign former Chelsea, Sunderland, Fulham and QPR winger, Clive Walker, from Brighton & Hove Albion and he was to prove the catalyst in the most successful period in the club's history. Woking won the FA Trophy for the first time in 1994, defeating Runcorn in the final at Wembley; the following season they became only the second club to win back-to-back FA Trophies (after Scarborough in 1976–77), defeating Kidderminster Harriers in the final. A third FA Trophy triumph followed in 1997, with Dagenham & Redbridge the opponents in the final. The Cards also achieved five successive top-five finishes in the Conference, including being runners-up in 1994–95 and 1995–96 when they finished below Stevenage. The club also continued to enjoy national prominence in the FA Cup. Barnet were defeated in successive seasons following draws at their homeground. In 1996–97 a run in the FA Cup saw the club beat Millwall, then top of Division Two, and Cambridge United, who were challenging for promotion from Division Three. The third round saw Woking draw 1–1 away to Premier League side Coventry City, thanks to a last minute equaliser from the Cards' Steve Thompson, but Coventry won the replay at Kingfield 2–1.

At the end of the 1996–97 campaign, having just clinched the FA Trophy for the third time, Geoff Chapple and his coach, Colin Lippiatt, left the club and joined Kingstonian. This was the beginning of a less successful period for the club. John McGovern and then Brian McDermott were given the position of manager, but neither achieved anything greater than a mid-table finish.

=== 21st century ===
Chart showing the progress of Woking F.C. through the English football league system since joining the Football Conference in 1992-93.

After McDermott, Colin Lippiatt returned but fared little better. He was replaced by his former boss as Geoff Chapple too came back to Woking. Lippiatt departed in January 2002 and Glenn Cockerill joined as Chapple's assistant. This season ended with the club just one place above the relegation places. In the meantime very significant events had taken place off the field. The downturn in the club's fortunes had led to a financial crisis. With the club facing administration or worse, local businessman and long-time fan Chris Ingram bought the club, becoming chairman in February 2002 with an aim of trying to increase the club's income and to secure its long-term financial stability.

Cockerill took over as manager later that year, and oversaw a relative period of stability for the club, before he was sacked shortly before the end of the 2006–07 season. An unimpressive campaign under the management of Frank Gray followed in 2007–08, before a disastrous 2008–09 season which saw three men (Kim Grant, Phil Gilchrist and Graham Baker) take charge of the club, eventually resulted in the club's relegation to the Conference South. That summer, a supporters' trust took over the running of the club. Woking finished 5th in their first Conference South season, but lost to Bath City in the play-off final. The following season saw Woking struggling to challenge for promotion, and Graham Baker was sacked halfway through the campaign for suggesting that the fans were expecting too much of the team.

Garry Hill took over as manager and improved the team's form, eventually resulting in another fifth-place finish, only for the club to get knocked out in the play-off semi-finals this time against Farnborough. In April 2012, having beaten Maidenhead United 0–1 with Giuseppe Sole scoring for a record breaking ninth game in a row, Woking were promoted to the Conference Premier, winning the Conference South with two games to spare. They eventually reached 97 points, beating second placed Dartford by nine points. After five seasons in the National League (formerly Conference Premier), Woking acrimoniously parted company with Hill after six-and-a-half years at the helm.

The club appointed former Southampton and West Ham United under-23s coach Anthony Limbrick in May 2017, which saw the club take another step to becoming full-time again, with players training three times a week. Despite a good run in the 2017–18 FA Cup, Woking's league form suffered, which culminated in just three league wins between October 2017 and April 2018. Limbrick was subsequently relieved of his duties just 11 months into a three-year contract, leaving assistant manager Jason Goodliffe to take over the managerial reins (aided by former Aldershot Town coach Matt Gray) to preserve The Cards' National League status with just five games remaining. However, Woking's fate was eventually sealed on the final day of the season after a 2–1 home defeat against Dover Athletic.

On 16 May 2018, and after much speculation, the club finally confirmed the appointment of former Kingstonian and Hampton & Richmond Borough manager Alan Dowson. Woking returned to the National League in 2019 at the first time of asking following a 1–0 win over Welling United in National League South play-off final. During this promotion season, Woking reached the third round of the FA Cup. Woking had beaten League Two side Swindon Town before losing out to Premier League side Watford 2–0.

The following season, Woking finished in 10th place back in the National League following the decision to stop the season in March 2020 due to the disruption caused by the COVID-19 pandemic. In the 2020–21 National League season, Woking finished 20th.

On 28 February 2022, Dowson was sacked by the club following a "prolonged run of poor form in the league", ending his four-year association with the Surrey-based side. Dowson informed local paper SurreyLive that the club had sacked him in a 20-second phone call and he would never return to Woking. Due to the circumstances of how Dowson was sacked board members Rosemary Johnson and Kelvin Reay resigned. Ian Dyer, the assistant manager, took charge of the club as caretaker manager.

On 28 March 2022, former Yeovil Town manager Darren Sarll was appointed until the end of the 2023–24 season. In the 2022–23 season, Woking finished the season in 4th place but lost the play-off eliminator at home to Bromley. Despite signing a new two-year deal in February 2023, Sarll was ultimately sacked in November 2023 following defeats to eighth-tier side, Ramsgate in the FA Cup and Oxford City in the National League.

A month later, former Coventry City, Sheffield United and Portsmouth player, Michael Doyle was appointed as first-team manager on a two-year deal, replacing the interim manager, Ian Dyer. Doyle went onto secure the club's National League status on the final day of the season, with a 3–0 home victory over AFC Fylde.

In July 2024, it was reported that Woking could go into administration if a buyer could not be found in the next few weeks. Owner Drew Volpe was willing to sell the club for £1, and only a £600,000 loan from his parents was keeping the club afloat. In November 2024, American businessman Todd Johnson (a former vice-chairman of Dagenham & Redbridge and a co-owner of MLS side Minnesota United FC) agreed to acquire a majority stake in Woking, with Volpe – who had provided £3m to the club – retaining a minority stake. In December 2024, shareholders voted in favour of the club's takeover by Johnson's Cardinal Football Group. After three defeats in four games, on 16 December 2024, the club sacked their then manager, Michael Doyle, as well as Ben Turner, assistant manager. Woking were 19th in the National League, a point above the relegation zone. Neal Ardley was appointed as manager on 19 December 2024.

== Stadium ==
At the start of the 1922 season, Woking F.C. moved to Kingfield Stadium, which has been known as the Laithwaite Community Stadium since August 2015. Previously, the club had played at the Horsell Cricket Ground before moving to a dedicated football venue on Pembroke Road in 1907.

Different stands of Woking FC stadium:

The KRE: This is the main home terrace and usually where the best atmosphere is found. It runs along one end of the pitch. The terrace is covered by a roof.

The Leslie Gosden stand: This stand is the largest stand of the stadium and is located opposite to the KRE. The LGS is an all seater stand consisting of around 2,000 seats. A quarter of this stand is usually given to away fans.

The Chris Lane terrace: The Chris Lane terrace is a large terrace without a roof and is reserved for away fans. The terrace runs a whole length of the pitch.

Moaners corner: Moaners corner is one of three stands on the opposite side of the pitch to the Chris lane terrace. It's a small terrace stand without a roof. The fans who stand in the terrace are usually veteran fans.

Directors box: The directors box is a small stand the directors of the club sit in, this is also where the media area and PA box are located. This stand is located in between moaners corner and the family stand.

The family stand: The family stand is located next to the directors box and is an all-seater stand usually consisting of families.

== Mascot ==
Woking F.C. has a team mascot called K.C. Kat.

== Rivalries ==
For many years Woking's main rivals have been Stevenage and Aldershot Town, where games attract larger than average crowds. Stevenage are Woking's historic rivals due to animosity in the 1990s, while the rivalry with Aldershot is a more recent rivalry due to locality. Torquay United have also become minor rivals due to intense games and competition when they were relegated to the national league south together; altercations between fans have also helped feed this new rivalry.

== Players ==
=== Current squad ===
As of 20 November 2026

Note: Flags indicate national team as defined under FIFA eligibility rules; some limited exceptions apply. Players may hold more than one non-FIFA nationality.

No.	Pos.	Nation	Player
1	GK	CHI	Vicente Reyes (on loan from Norwich City)
2	DF	ENG	Zico Asare
3	DF	ENG	Caleb Richards
4	DF	ENG	Chinwike Okoli (vice-captain)
5	DF	ENG	Timi Odusina
6	DF	IRL	Shadrach Ogie
7	MF	ENG	Harrison Sohna
8	MF	ALB	Roy Syla
9	FW	ENG	Josh Kelly
10	FW	IRL	Aiden O'Brien
11	FW	ENG	Matt Ward
12	DF	SCO	Charlie McArthur (on loan from York City)
13	GK	ENG	Craig Ross (player-manager)
14	DF	ENG	Tariq Hinds
16	DF	ENG	Tunji Akinola
18	FW	ENG	Liam Dulson
19	FW	ENG	Tom Dryer
20	FW	ENG	Taylan Harris (on loan from Luton Town)

No.	Pos.	Nation	Player
21	DF	ENG	Jaiden Putman (on loan from Queens Park Rangers)
22	GK	FIN	Will Jääskeläinen
23	MF	NGR	Timmy Akinola
25	MF	ENG	Jake Forster-Caskey (captain)
26	MF	ENG	Steven Turner (on loan from Ipswich Town)
27	FW	ENG	Sean Adarkwa
28	DF	ENG	Josh Grant
30	DF	CYP	Anthony Georgiou
32	FW	ENG	John Marquis
33	DF	SKN	Rico Browne (on loan from Walsall)
38	FW	ENG	Jack Tricker
39	MF	ENG	Will Ledbury (dual-registered with Alton)
40	GK	ENG	Mikey Verga
41	FW	ENG	Will Richards
42	DF	ENG	Edward Scott (dual-registered with Alton)
43	DF	ENG	Dillon Davies (dual-registered with Abbey Rangers)
44	FW	ENG	Jalil Page

=== Out on loan ===
Note: Flags indicate national team as defined under FIFA eligibility rules; some limited exceptions apply. Players may hold more than one non-FIFA nationality.

No.	Pos.	Nation	Player
17	FW	ENG	Ashley Clarke (at Chelmsford City until 22 December 2026)
24	FW	ENG	Josh Ayres (at Walton & Hersham)

No.	Pos.	Nation	Player
37	DF	ENG	Kemall Wilson (at Leatherhead until 31 May 2027)

== Seasons ==
Statistics from the previous decade.

Year	League	Level	Pld	W	D	L	GF	GA	GD	Pts	Position	Leading league scorer	Goals	FA Cup	FA Trophy	NL Cup	Average attendance
2016–17	National League	5	46	14	11	21	66	80	−14	53	18 of 24	Gozie Ugwu	17	R2	R1	—	1,429
2017–18	National League	5	46	13	9	24	56	76	−20	48	21 of 24; Relegated	Charlie Carter	12	R2	R1	—	1,911
2018–19	National League South	6	42	23	9	10	76	49	+27	78	2 of 22; Won in PO final	Max Kretzschmar	14	R3	R1	—	1,882
2019–20	National League	5	38	15	10	13	50	55	-5	55	10 of 24; Season finished early due to COVID-19 pandemic	Jake Hyde	16	QR4	R1	—	2,139
2020–21	National League	5	42	8	9	25	42	69	-27	33	20 of 23	Max Kretzschmar	7	R1	SF	—	799 (Note: Fans were only permitted during two fixtures this season due to COVID-19 pandemic.)
2021–22	National League	5	44	16	5	23	59	61	-2	53	15 of 23	Tahvon Campbell; Inih Effiong; Max Kretzschmar	13	QR4	R3	—	2,703
2022–23	National League	5	46	24	10	12	71	48	+23	82	4 of 24; Lost in PO quarter-final	Rhys Browne	13	R1	R3	—	2,734
2023–24	National League	5	46	15	10	21	49	55	-6	55	17 of 24	Ricky Korboa	7	R1	R3	—	2,723
2024–25	National League	5	46	13	19	14	52	59	-7	58	15 of 24	Harry Beautyman	10	R1	SF	GS	2,322
2025–26	National League	5	46	16	15	15	69	54	+15	63	10 of 24	Olly Sanderson	17	QR4	QF	GS	2,701

== Managerial history ==
A list of Woking FC managers from 1984 onwards.

Dates	Names	Notes
1984–1997	(England) Geoff Chapple	
1997–1998	(Scotland) John McGovern	
1998–2000	(England) Brian McDermott	
2000–2001	(England) Colin Lippiatt	
2001–2002	(England) Geoff Chapple	
2002–2007	(England) Glenn Cockerill	
2007	(England) Graham Baker	Caretaker Managers
2007	(England) Neil Smith	Caretaker Managers
2007–2008	(Scotland) Frank Gray	
2008	(Ghana) Kim Grant	
2008–2009	(England) Phil Gilchrist	
2009–2011	(England) Graham Baker	
2011–2017	(England) Garry Hill	
2017–2018	(Australia) Anthony Limbrick	
2018	(England) Geoff Chapple	Caretaker Manager
2018–2022	(England) Alan Dowson	
2022	(England) Ian Dyer	Caretaker Manager
2022–2023	(England) Darren Sarll	
2023	(England) Ian Dyer	Caretaker Manager
2023–2024	(Republic of Ireland) Michael Doyle	
2024–2026	(England) Neal Ardley	
2026	(Northern Ireland) Dale Gorman	Caretaker Managers
2026	(England) Jake Hyde	Caretaker Managers
2026	(England) Craig Ross	Caretaker Managers
2026	(England) Jermain Defoe	
2026	(England) Jake Hyde	Caretaker Managers
2026	(England) Craig Ross	Caretaker Managers
2026–	(England) Craig Ross	Caretaker Manager

== Club officials ==
Position	Club Official
Chairman	(United States) Todd Johnson
Directors	(England) Steven Batchelor
Directors	(England) Dean Curtis
Directors	(United States) Dwight Volpe
Director and Company Secretary	(England) George Burnett
Honorary Vice President	(England) Peter Jordan
Club Ambassador	(England) Geoff Chapple

Source: Woking F.C.

== Management team ==
Position	Staff
Interim Manager	(England) Craig Ross
First-Team Coach	(England) Matthew Saunders
Director of Football	(England) Jody Brown
Goalkeeper Coach	(England) Craig Ross
Physiotherapists	(England) David Akinola
Physiotherapists	(England) Dan Rowe
Kit Manager	(England) Malcolm Jobling
Kit Assistants	(England) Nick Greenwood
Kit Assistants	(England) Phil Marlow

Source: Woking F.C.

== Club records ==
- Highest league position: 2nd in Conference National, 1994–95, 1995–96
- Best FA Cup performance: Fourth round, 1990–91
- Best FA Trophy best performance: Winners, 1993–94, 1994–95, 1996–97 (Joint record number of wins)
- Largest transfer fee received: £150,000 for Kevin Betsy to Fulham, 1998
- Largest transfer fee paid: £60,000 for Chris Sharpling from Crystal Palace, 2001
- Record win: 17–3 vs. Farnham, Surrey Charity Shield, 1913
- Heaviest defeat: 16–0 vs. New Crusaders, FA Cup, 1905
- Record attendance: 6,000 vs Swansea City, FA Cup, 19 December 1978; 6,000 vs Coventry City, FA Cup, 4 February 1997
- Record home league attendance: 5,297 vs Aldershot Town, National League, 1 January 2023

== Honours ==
League

- Isthmian League / National League South (level 6)
  - Champions: 1991–92, 2011–12
  - Play-off winners: 2019
- Isthmian League Division One
  - Runners-up: 1989–90
- Isthmian League Division Two South
  - Champions: 1986–87

Cup

- FA Trophy
  - Winners: 1993–94, 1994–95, 1996–97
  - Runners-up: 2005–06
- Conference League Cup
  - Winners: 2004–05
- Isthmian League Cup
  - Winners: 1990–91
- FA Amateur Cup
  - Winners: 1957–58
- Isthmian Charity Shield
  - Winners: 1992, 1993
- Surrey Senior Cup
  - Winners (13): 1912–13, 1926–27, 1955–56, 1956–57, 1971–72, 1990–91, 1993–94, 1995–96, 1999–00, 2003–04, 2011–12, 2013–14, 2016–17
- Trevor Jones Memorial Trophy
  - Winners: 2011
- Vauxhall Championship Shield
  - Winners: 1995
