= 1986–87 FA Cup =

Tournament details
- Country: England; Wales

Final positions
- Champions: Coventry City (1st title)
- Runners-up: Tottenham Hotspur

Tournament statistics
- Top goal scorer(s): Keith Houchen; Carl Saunders (5 goals)

The 1986–87 FA Cup was the 106th season of the world's oldest football knockout competition, the FA Cup. The competition was won by Coventry City, who beat Tottenham Hotspur 3–2, after extra-time, in the final at Wembley Stadium. It was Tottenham's only defeat in eight finals up to that point. The tournament started in August 1986, with non-league teams competing in the qualifying rounds.

== Qualifying rounds ==
Most participating clubs that were not members of the Football League competed in the qualifying rounds to secure one of 28 places available in the first round.

The winners from the fourth qualifying round were Southport, Caernarfon Town, Spennymoor United, Whitby Town, Nuneaton Borough, Chorley, Stafford Rangers, Boston United, Kettering Town, Halesowen Town, Bishop's Stortford, Woodford Town, Bromsgrove Rovers, Chelmsford City, Enfield, Wealdstone, Aylesbury United, Welling United, Slough Town, VS Rugby, Farnborough Town, Bognor Regis Town, Fareham Town, Dartford, Maidstone United, Bath City, Woking and Ton Pentre.

Appearing in the competition proper for the first time were Caernarfon Town, Woodford Town, Welling United and Ton Pentre. However, Caernarfon Town's accomplishments brought back memories of predecessor club Caernarfon Athletic's famous FA Cup run in 1929-30 while Woodford Town was the first club from that Essex community to feature in the main draw of the Cup since Woodford Bridge in 1883-84. Of the others, Southport and Woking had last featured in the first round in 1978–79, Spennymoor United had last done so in 1977-78 and Bromsgrove Rovers had last done so in 1956-57.

In a season where the Football League abolished its annual re-election system and allowed for automatic promotion and relegation between the Football Conference and the Fourth Division, 13 Conference clubs (out of 22) featured in the main draw of the FA Cup. Ironically, the season's Conference champions Scarborough, who would benefit from the new system and be promoted into the Football League in 1987, were eliminated from the Cup in the first qualifying round by unheralded Northern Premier League outfit Goole Town.

== First round proper ==
The 48 teams from the Football League Third and Fourth Divisions entered in this round along with the 28 non-league qualifiers and Altrincham, Runcorn, Frickley Athletic and Telford United who were given byes. The first round of games were played over the weekend 15–16 November 1986, with the exception of the Bristol Rovers–Brentford game. Replays were played in the midweek fixtures on either 17th-18th or on 24th.

Three clubs from Step 8 of the English football pyramid featured in the draw: Whitby Town and Spennymoor United from the Northern League and Woking from the Isthmian League Second Division South. They were the lowest-ranked teams in the round as the Welsh League (which included Ton Pentre) was the highest-standard football competition in Wales until 1992.

Tie no	Home team	Score	Away team	Date
1	Chester City	1–1	Rotherham United	15 November 1986
Replay	Rotherham United	1–1	Chester City	18 November 1986
Replay	Chester City	1–0	Rotherham United	24 November 1986
2	Darlington	2–1	Mansfield Town	16 November 1986
3	Dartford (6)	1–1	Enfield (5)	15 November 1986
Replay	Enfield	3–0	Dartford	18 November 1986
4	AFC Bournemouth	7–2	Fareham Town (6)	15 November 1986
5	Bath City (5)	3–2	Aylesbury United (6)	15 November 1986
6	Bristol City	3–1	VS Rugby (7)	15 November 1986
7	Preston North End	5–1	Bury	15 November 1986
8	Walsall	2–0	Chesterfield	15 November 1986
9	Woking (8)	1–1	Chelmsford City (6)	15 November 1986
Replay	Chelmsford City	2–1	Woking	17 November 1986
10	Notts County	1–1	Carlisle United	15 November 1986
Replay	Carlisle United	0–3	Notts County	18 November 1986
11	Middlesbrough	3–0	Blackpool	15 November 1986
12	Swindon Town	4–0	Farnborough Town (6)	15 November 1986
13	Wrexham	2–1	Hartlepool United	15 November 1986
14	Chorley (6)	1–1	Wolverhampton Wanderers	15 November 1986
Replay	Wolverhampton Wanderers	1–1	Chorley	18 November 1986
Replay	Chorley	3–0	Wolverhampton Wanderers	24 November 1986
15	Bristol Rovers	0–0	Brentford	3 December 1986
Replay	Brentford	2–0	Bristol Rovers	6 December 1986
16	Northampton Town	3–0	Peterborough United	16 November 1986
17	Spennymoor United (8)	2–3	Tranmere Rovers	15 November 1986
18	Southend United	4–1	Halesowen Town (7)	15 November 1986
19	Exeter City	1–1	Cambridge United	15 November 1986
Replay	Cambridge United	2–0	Exeter City	19 November 1986
20	Scunthorpe United	2–0	Southport (6)	15 November 1986
21	Ton Pentre (*)	1–4	Cardiff City	15 November 1986
22	Bromsgrove Rovers (6)	0–1	Newport County	15 November 1986
23	Port Vale	1–0	Stafford Rangers (5)	15 November 1986
24	Halifax Town	1–1	Bolton Wanderers	15 November 1986
Replay	Bolton Wanderers	1–1	Halifax Town	18 November 1986
Replay	Halifax Town	1–3	Bolton Wanderers	24 November 1986
25	Wealdstone (5)	1–1	Swansea City	15 November 1986
Replay	Swansea City	4–1	Wealdstone	24 November 1986
26	Runcorn (5)	1–1	Boston United (5)	15 November 1986
Replay	Boston United	1–2	Runcorn	19 November 1986
27	York City	3–1	Crewe Alexandra	15 November 1986
28	Hereford United	3–3	Fulham	15 November 1986
Replay	Fulham	4–0	Hereford United	24 November 1986
29	Bishop's Stortford (6)	1–1	Colchester United	15 November 1986
Replay	Colchester United	2–0	Bishop's Stortford	18 November 1986
30	Kettering Town (5)	0–3	Gillingham	15 November 1986
31	Aldershot	1–0	Torquay United	15 November 1986
32	Wigan Athletic	3–1	Lincoln City	15 November 1986
33	Nuneaton Borough (5)	0–3	Rochdale	15 November 1986
34	Woodford Town (7)	0–1	Orient	15 November 1986
35	Slough Town (6)	1–1	Bognor Regis Town (6)	15 November 1986
Replay	Bognor Regis Town	0–1	Slough Town	18 November 1986
36	Whitby Town (8)	2–2	Doncaster Rovers	15 November 1986
Replay	Doncaster Rovers	3–2	Whitby Town	18 November 1986
37	Telford United (5)	3–0	Burnley	15 November 1986
38	Frickley Athletic (5)	0–0	Altrincham (5)	15 November 1986
Replay	Altrincham	4–0	Frickley Athletic	18 November 1986
39	Welling United (5)	1–1	Maidstone United (5)	15 November 1986
Replay	Maidstone United	4–1	Welling United	24 November 1986
40	Caernarfon Town (6)	1–0	Stockport County	15 November 1986

(* Ton Pentre was competing exclusively in the Welsh Football League National Division, outside the English football system.)

== Second round proper ==
The second round matches were played on 5–7 December 1986, with the exception of the Cardiff City-Brentford fixture, which was played on the following Tuesday due to the timing of Brentford's first round replay against Bristol Rovers. Replays were played on 9th–10th. The round included four clubs from Step 6 of the English football system: Caernarfon Town and Chorley from the Northern Premier League, Chelmsford City from the Southern League Premier Division and Slough Town from the Isthmian League Premier Division.

Tie no	Home team	Score	Away team	Date
1	Chester City	3–1	Doncaster Rovers	6 December 1986
2	Darlington	0–5	Wigan Athletic	6 December 1986
3	AFC Bournemouth	0–1	Orient	6 December 1986
4	Bristol City	1–1	Bath City (5)	6 December 1986
Replay	Bristol City	3–0	Bath City	9 December 1986
5	Rochdale	1–4	Wrexham	6 December 1986
6	Walsall	5–0	Port Vale	6 December 1986
7	Gillingham	2–0	Chelmsford City (6)	6 December 1986
8	Notts County	0–1	Middlesbrough	7 December 1986
9	Bolton Wanderers	2–0	Tranmere Rovers	6 December 1986
10	Swindon Town	3–0	Enfield (5)	6 December 1986
11	Chorley (6)	0–0	Preston North End	6 December 1986
Replay	Preston North End	5–0	Chorley	9 December 1986
12	Fulham	2–0	Newport County	6 December 1986
13	Maidstone United (5)	1–0	Cambridge United	7 December 1986
14	Southend United	4–4	Northampton Town	5 December 1986
Replay	Northampton Town	3–2	Southend United	10 December 1986
15	Scunthorpe United	1–0	Runcorn (5)	6 December 1986
16	Cardiff City	2–0	Brentford	9 December 1986
17	Aldershot	3–2	Colchester United	6 December 1986
18	Telford United (5)	1–0	Altrincham (5)	6 December 1986
19	Swansea City	3–0	Slough Town (6)	6 December 1986
20	Caernarfon Town (6)	0–0	York City	6 December 1986
Replay	York City	1–2	Caernarfon Town	9 December 1986

== Third round proper ==
Teams from the Football League First and Second Divisions entered in this round. Most of the third round of games in the FA Cup were played over the weekend 10–11 January 1987, however various matches and replays were played as late as 31 January. Holders Liverpool were eliminated by Luton Town. Caernarfon Town was again the lowest-ranked team in the round, while Caernarfon, Maidstone United and Telford United were the last non-league clubs left in the competition.

Tie no	Home team	Score	Away team	Date
1	Bristol City (3)	1–1	Plymouth Argyle (2)	10 January 1987
Replay	Plymouth Argyle	3–1	Bristol City	19 January 1987
2	Watford (1)	3–1	Maidstone United (5)	10 January 1987
3	Reading (2)	1–3	Arsenal (1)	10 January 1987
4	Aston Villa (1)	2–2	Chelsea (1)	10 January 1987
Replay	Chelsea	2–1	Aston Villa	21 January 1987
5	Sheffield Wednesday (1)	1–0	Derby County (2)	26 January 1987
6	Grimsby Town (2)	1–1	Stoke City (2)	10 January 1987
Replay	Stoke City	1–1	Grimsby Town	26 January 1987
Replay	Stoke City	6–0	Grimsby Town	28 January 1987
7	Middlesbrough (3)	0–1	Preston North End (4)	10 January 1987
8	Luton Town (1)	0–0	Liverpool (1)	11 January 1987
Replay	Liverpool	0–0	Luton Town	26 January 1987
Replay	Luton Town	3–0	Liverpool	28 January 1987
9	Everton (1)	2–1	Southampton (1)	10 January 1987
10	Shrewsbury Town (2)	1–2	Hull City (2)	31 January 1987
11	Wrexham (4)	1–2	Chester City (3)	10 January 1987
12	Sheffield United (2)	0–0	Brighton & Hove Albion (2)	10 January 1987
Replay	Brighton & Hove Albion	1–2	Sheffield United	21 January 1987
13	Ipswich Town (2)	0–1	Birmingham City (2)	10 January 1987
14	Newcastle United (1)	2–1	Northampton Town (4)	21 January 1987
15	Tottenham Hotspur (1)	3–2	Scunthorpe United (4)	10 January 1987
16	Queens Park Rangers (1)	5–2	Leicester City (1)	10 January 1987
17	Fulham (3)	0–1	Swindon Town (3)	10 January 1987
18	Coventry City (1)	3–0	Bolton Wanderers (3)	10 January 1987
19	Portsmouth (2)	2–0	Blackburn Rovers (2)	10 January 1987
20	Manchester United (1)	1–0	Manchester City (1)	10 January 1987
21	Norwich City (1)	1–1	Huddersfield Town (2)	10 January 1987
Replay	Huddersfield Town	2–4	Norwich City	21 January 1987
22	Millwall (2)	0–0	Cardiff City (4)	10 January 1987
Replay	Cardiff City	2–2	Millwall	20 January 1987
Replay	Cardiff City	1–0	Millwall	26 January 1987
23	Oldham Athletic (2)	1–1	Bradford City (2)	10 January 1987
Replay	Bradford City	5–1	Oldham Athletic	19 January 1987
24	Crystal Palace (2)	1–0	Nottingham Forest (1)	11 January 1987
25	Wimbledon (1)	2–1	Sunderland (2)	10 January 1987
26	Charlton Athletic (1)	1–2	Walsall (3)	10 January 1987
27	Aldershot (4)	3–0	Oxford United (1)	10 January 1987
28	Wigan Athletic (3)	2–1	Gillingham (3)	19 January 1987
29	Orient (4)	1–1	West Ham United (1)	10 January 1987
Replay	West Ham United	4–1	Orient	31 January 1987
30	Telford United (5)	1–2	Leeds United (2)	11 January 1987
31	Swansea City (4)	3–2	West Bromwich Albion (2)	10 January 1987
32	Caernarfon Town (6)	0–0	Barnsley (2)	10 January 1987
Replay	Barnsley	1–0	Caernarfon Town	26 January 1987

== Fourth round proper ==
The fourth round of games were played mainly over the weekend 31 January – 1 February 1987. All other ties took place on 3–4 February. Four teams from the Fourth Division remained in the draw: Preston North End, Cardiff City, Aldershot and Swansea City.

Tie no	Home team	Score	Away team	Date
1	Chester City	1–1	Sheffield Wednesday	31 January 1987
Replay	Sheffield Wednesday	3–1	Chester City	4 February 1987
2	Watford	1–0	Chelsea	1 February 1987
3	Walsall	1–0	Birmingham City	31 January 1987
4	Luton Town	1–1	Queens Park Rangers	31 January 1987
Replay	Queens Park Rangers	2–1	Luton Town	4 February 1987
5	Swindon Town	1–2	Leeds United	3 February 1987
6	Newcastle United	2–0	Preston North End	31 January 1987
7	Tottenham Hotspur	4–0	Crystal Palace	31 January 1987
8	West Ham United	4–0	Sheffield United	9 February 1987
9	Manchester United	0–1	Coventry City	31 January 1987
10	Bradford City	0–1	Everton	31 January 1987
11	Wimbledon	4–0	Portsmouth	31 January 1987
12	Arsenal	6–1	Plymouth Argyle	31 January 1987
13	Stoke City	2–1	Cardiff City	31 January 1987
14	Aldershot	1–1	Barnsley	31 January 1987
Replay	Barnsley	3–0	Aldershot	3 February 1987
15	Wigan Athletic	1–0	Norwich City	31 January 1987
16	Swansea City	0–1	Hull City	3 February 1987

== Fifth round proper ==
The fifth set of games was played over the weekend 21–22 February 1987, with the first set of replays on 24th-25th. Walsall and Wigan Athletic, from the Third Division, were the lowest-ranked teams in the round.

Tie no	Home team	Score	Away team	Date
1	Walsall	1–1	Watford	21 February 1987
Replay	Watford	4–4	Walsall	24 February 1987
Replay	Walsall	0–1	Watford	2 March 1987
2	Sheffield Wednesday	1–1	West Ham United	21 February 1987
Replay	West Ham United	0–2	Sheffield Wednesday	25 February 1987
3	Tottenham Hotspur	1–0	Newcastle United	21 February 1987
4	Wimbledon	3–1	Everton	22 February 1987
5	Arsenal	2–0	Barnsley	21 February 1987
6	Leeds United	2–1	Queens Park Rangers	21 February 1987
7	Stoke City	0–1	Coventry City	21 February 1987
8	Wigan Athletic	3–0	Hull City	21 February 1987

== Sixth round proper ==
The sixth round of FA Cup games were played over the weekend 14–15 March 1987. There were no replays; each game was won by the away team. Wigan Athletic was the last team from the first round left in the competition.

Tie no	Home team	Score	Away team	Date
1	Sheffield Wednesday	1–3	Coventry City	14 March 1987
2	Wimbledon	0–2	Tottenham Hotspur	15 March 1987
3	Arsenal	1–3	Watford	14 March 1987
4	Wigan Athletic	0–2	Leeds United	15 March 1987

== Semi-finals ==
Seven time winners Tottenham Hotspur were drawn with 1984 finalists Watford for the Villa Park semi-final, which saw the North Londoners win 4-1 and reach their eighth final, having won all of their previous FA Cup finals.

Hillsborough was the venue for the other semi-final. Leeds United, managed by their former captain Billy Bremner, were pushing for promotion in the Second Division and making their first serious challenge for a major trophy in over 10 years. Their opponents were Coventry City, who had never reached an FA Cup semi-final before. In a closely fought game, Coventry won 3–2.

11 April 1987

Tottenham Hotspur	4–1	Watford
Hodge 11', 73'; C. Allen 13'; P. Allen 35'		M. Allen 75'

Villa Park, Birmingham
Attendance: 46,151
Referee: Ray Lewis

12 April 1987

Coventry City	3–2 (a.e.t.)	Leeds United
Gynn 68'; Houchen 78'; Bennett 99'	Report	Rennie 14'; Edwards 83'

Hillsborough Stadium, Sheffield
Attendance: 51,372
Referee: Roger Milford

== Final ==
16 May 1987

Coventry City	3–2 (aet)	Tottenham Hotspur
Bennett 9'; Houchen 64'; Mabbutt (o.g.) 96'		C. Allen 2'; Mabbutt 40'

Wembley, London
Attendance: 98,000
Referee: Neil Midgley (Manchester)

Coventry	Tottenham

After two minutes, Clive Allen scored his 49th goal of the season, heading past keeper Steve Ogrizovic at the near-post from a Chris Waddle cross. Within seven minutes though, Coventry were level through Dave Bennett, a Cup Final loser in 1981 for Manchester City at the hands of Spurs. Tottenham were back in front five minutes before the break through past defender Gary Mabbutt.

Midway through the second half Coventry were level again – Bennett's cross from the right was met by striker Keith Houchen with a diving header. The scores stayed level until full-time and the game went into extra time. Six minutes in, Mabbutt scored an own goal after Lloyd McGrath centred the ball and it took a deflection off of the Spurs defender's knee and over keeper Ray Clemence.

== Broadcast coverage ==
UK television rights were shared by the BBC and ITV, who continued to alternate live and highlights coverage from the 3rd round onwards.

Round 3: Luton Town 0–0 Liverpool (Live, BBC). The Big Match (ITV) showed highlights of Manchester United 1–0 Manchester City and Reading 1–3 Arsenal.

Round 4: Watford 1–0 Chelsea (Live, ITV). Match of the Day (BBC) showed highlights of Manchester United 0–1 Coventry City, Wimbledon 4–0 Portsmouth and Bradford City 0–1 Everton.

Round 5: Wimbledon 3–1 Everton (Live, BBC). The Big Match (ITV) showed highlights of Tottenham Hotspur 1–0 Newcastle United and Sheffield Wednesday 1–1 West Ham United.

Round 6: Wimbledon 0–2 Tottenham Hotspur (Live, ITV). Match of the Day (BBC) showed highlights of Arsenal 1–3 Watford and Sheffield Wednesday 1–3 Coventry City. ITV showed highlights of Wigan Athletic 0–2 Leeds United, which was played on the Sunday, as part of their live broadcast.

Semi Finals: The Big Match (ITV) showed highlights of Tottenham Hotspur 4–1 Watford on the Saturday evening. Coventry City 3–2 Leeds United was played at 12:15pm on the Sunday lunchtime on police advice and ITV showed extensive delayed coverage later that afternoon. The match went to extra time and had not quite finished when The Big Match began at 2:30pm.

Final: Coventry City 3–2 Tottenham Hotspur aet (Live, BBC and ITV shared)
