= 1987–88 in English football =

Football in England
- Season: 1987–88

Men's football
- First Division: Liverpool
- Second Division: Millwall
- Third Division: Sunderland
- Fourth Division: Wolverhampton Wanderers
- Conference: Lincoln City
- FA Cup: Wimbledon
- Associate Members' Cup: Wolverhampton Wanderers
- League Cup: Luton Town
- Charity Shield: Everton

The 1987–88 season was the 108th season of competitive football in England.

== Diary of the season ==
3 July 1987 – Chelsea sign defender Tony Dorigo from Aston Villa for £475,000.

6 July 1987 – Nottingham Forest's Dutch midfielder Johnny Metgod signs for Tottenham Hotspur in a £250,000 deal.

7 July 1987 – England goalkeeper Peter Shilton moves to Derby County from Southampton for £90,000.

9 July 1987 – Manchester United sign Arsenal defender Viv Anderson for £250,000. Former Queens Park Rangers and England forward Gerry Francis, 36, is appointed player-manager of Third Division side Bristol Rovers as successor to Bobby Gould who moved to Wimbledon last month.

14 July 1987 – Peter Beardsley becomes the most expensive player to move between British clubs when he joins Liverpool in a £1.9 million deal from Newcastle United.

15 July 1987 – Ray Harford, first-team coach, is promoted to the manager's seat at Luton Town following the resignation of John Moore. Coventry City more than double their record transfer outlay with a £750,000 move for Chelsea striker David Speedie.

17 July 1987 – Portsmouth prepare for their return to the First Division with a £60,000 move for Wrexham midfielder Barry Horne.

21 July 1987 – Tottenham Hotspur and England midfielder Glenn Hoddle moves to AS Monaco for £800,000 on a three-year contract. Manchester United get a £300,000 insurance payout from The Football Association following the injury enforced retirement of 29-year-old goalkeeper Gary Bailey.

22 July 1987 – Scunthorpe United announce that they will leave the Old Showground at the end of the season and move to a new stadium in the town's suburbs – the first relocation of a Football League club since Southend United moved to Roots Hall in 1955.

24 July 1987 – Manchester City are reported to have made an approach for out of favour Liverpool midfielder John Wark. Watford sign prolific Reading striker Trevor Senior for £325,000.

29 July 1987 – Wimbledon sign defenders Terry Phelan from Swansea City for £100,000 and Eric Young from Brighton & Hove Albion for £70,000. Chelsea striker Kerry Dixon withdraws his transfer request.

30 July 1987 – Manchester United complete the signing of striker Brian McClair after a tribunal orders them to pay £850,000 for the striker, originally valued at £2million by Celtic.

1 August 1987 – Everton defeat Coventry City 1–0 in the FA Charity Shield at Wembley Stadium, with Wayne Clarke scoring the only goal of the game.

3 August 1987 – The Today newspaper cancels its sponsorship of the Football League after just one year, and less than two weeks before the new season is due to begin.

6 August 1987 - Britain's first million-pound player, Trevor Francis, returns to Britain when Graeme Souness signs him for Rangers in a £70,000 deal from Atalanta of Italy.

7 August 1987 – Portsmouth midfielder Mick Kennedy is fined £5,000 for claiming in a national newspaper that he was "the hardest man in football and proud of my reputation".

8 August 1987 – The Football League begins its centenary celebrations by hosting a match against a Rest of the World XI at Wembley. Diego Maradona and Gary Lineker are in the side beaten by a Football League XI.

11 August 1987 – Former Leeds United and England manager Don Revie, 60, announces that he is suffering from motor neurone disease, which was diagnosed in May this year.

12 August 1987 – Barclays Bank become the Football League's new sponsors in a three-year deal worth in the region of £5million, while Portsmouth prepare for their first top division campaign since the 1950s by paying Leeds United £285,000 for striker Ian Baird.

15 August 1987 – The Football League season begins. In the First Division, Queens Park Rangers record the biggest win of the day by beating West Ham United 3–0. Champions Everton beat Norwich City 1–0, and Liverpool win 2–1 away to Arsenal. Scarborough, new members after their promotion to the Fourth Division from the GM Vauxhall Conference, hold fallen giants Wolverhampton Wanderers to a 2–2 draw, but crowd trouble results in 56 arrests.

18 August 1987 – Newly promoted First Division side Derby County pay a club record £760,000 for Southampton defender Mark Wright. UEFA announce that if the ban on English clubs in Europe is lifted in time for the 1988–89 UEFA Cup, there will only be two slots available for clubs in England due to their UEFA coefficient falling.

22 August 1987 – Brian McClair scores his first goal for Manchester United in their 2–0 home league win over Watford. In the first top flight South Coast derby, newly promoted Portsmouth draw 2–2 with Southampton at Fratton Park.

24 August 1987 – Striker Terry Gibson ends his unsuccessful 18-month spell at Manchester United and joins Wimbledon for £200,000.

25 August 1987 – Luton Town lift their ban on away fans and are allowed to compete in the League Cup, from which they were banned last season.

31 August 1987 – Manchester United finish August as First Division leaders, two points ahead of Queens Park Rangers and Nottingham Forest. At the bottom of the table, Charlton Athletic, Sheffield Wednesday and Luton Town remain without a League win so far this season. In the Second Division, Plymouth Argyle and Barnsley lead the way on goal difference, but fancied Aston Villa are fourth from bottom.

3 September 1987 – Ten months after being sacked by Manchester United, Ron Atkinson returns to football for a second spell as manager of West Bromwich Albion.

4 September 1987 – Arsenal striker Charlie Nicholas hands in a transfer request after manager George Graham dropped him in favour of Perry Groves as strike-partner to new signing Alan Smith.

5 September 1987 – Gillingham score a club record 10–0 victory over Chesterfield, a week after defeating Southend 8–1.

9 September 1987 – 25 Liverpool fans are extradited to Belgium on manslaughter charges in connection to the Heysel Stadium disaster, in which 39 spectators (most of them Italian) were crushed to death at the 1985 European Cup Final. Oxford United's £400,000 bid for Derby County winger Nigel Callaghan is accepted, but the player turns down the chance to move – less than a year after he joined the East Midlands club for barely a third of that amount.

12 September 1987 – Brazilian international striker Mirandinha gets his first goals for Newcastle, scoring twice in a 2–2 draw at Old Trafford against Manchester United.

16 September 1987 – Manager Bryan Hamilton brings Mike Newell to Leicester City from Luton Town for £350,000.

18 September 1987 – Defender David Bardsley moves between First Division strugglers Watford and Oxford United for £265,000. Charlton Athletic sign Wales striker Andy Jones from Third Division side Port Vale.

20 September 1987 – Everton sign Scotland midfielder Ian Wilson from Leicester City for £300,000. Liverpool defender Steve Nicol scores a hat-trick in a 4–1 away league win over Newcastle United.

23 September 1987 – Terry Venables, former manager of Crystal Palace and Queens Park Rangers, is sacked after three years as manager of Spanish giants FC Barcelona.

28 September 1987 – Tommy Docherty is appointed manager of GM Vauxhall Conference side Altrincham.

29 September 1987 – John Aldridge reaches the 10-goal mark in the league for Liverpool after just seven games, scoring a hat-trick in their 4–0 home win over Derby County.

30 September 1987 – Queens Park Rangers, without a top division league title to their name, finish the month as leaders of the First Division, three points ahead of Liverpool, who have two games in hand. Charlton Athletic are bottom, with four points from eight matches. Bradford City top the Second Division, with Hull City second. Crystal Palace and newly promoted Middlesbrough and Swindon Town occupy the play-off places.

2 October 1987 – Tottenham Hotspur sell defender Richard Gough to Rangers for £1.5million – a record fee for a British defender.

10 October 1987 – Everton's Graeme Sharp and Adrian Heath bag braces as Chelsea are beaten 4–1 at Goodison Park. Paul Wilkinson scores the only goal of the game as Nottingham Forest beat Derby County in the first East Midlands derby of the season.

12 October 1987 – More than three years after leaving Fulham, Malcolm Macdonald makes a management comeback with Second Division strugglers Huddersfield Town.

14 October 1987 – England beat Turkey 8–0 in a European Championship qualifier at Wembley, repeating the scoreline achieved in a 1986 World Cup qualifier in Istanbul in November 1984.

15 October 1987 – Newcastle United sign 18-year-old striker Michael O'Neill from Coleraine of Northern Ireland for £55,000.

16 October 1987 – Sheffield Wednesday sign defender Nigel Pearson from Shrewsbury Town for £250,000.

17 October 1987 – Liverpool move to the top of the First Division by thrashing previous leaders Queens Park Rangers 4–0 at Anfield.

19 October 1987 – Liverpool sign Oxford United and Republic of Ireland winger Ray Houghton for £825,000.

23 October 1987 – David Pleat resigns after 15 months as manager of Tottenham Hotspur, following allegations that he was involved in kerb crawling.

27 October 1987 – Tottenham Hotspur appoint Terry Venables as their new manager.

28 October 1987 – Everton knock Liverpool out of the League Cup with a 1–0 win at Anfield in the third round.

31 October 1987 – Arsenal and Queens Park Rangers share leadership of the First Division, but Liverpool, just one point behind, have three games in hand. Charlton Athletic remain bottom of the table, and are joined by Watford and Norwich City in the relegation zone. Bradford City now have a six-point lead at the top of the Second Division, their nearest rivals being Middlesbrough and Hull City. Aston Villa now stand fourth, with Ipswich Town and Birmingham City close behind.

1 November 1987 – Liverpool move back to the top of the First Division table by beating Everton 2–0 in the Merseyside derby. 31-year-old England midfielder Ray Wilkins returns to Britain after more than three years away when he signs for Rangers in a £250,000 move from Paris St Germain.

7 November 1987 – Second Division promotion chasers Manchester City beat struggling Huddersfield Town 10–1 at Maine Road. Three players - Paul Stewart, David White and Tony Adcock - score hat-tricks.

10 November 1987 – 21-year-old Walsall striker David Kelly scores a hat-trick on his debut for the Republic of Ireland in their 5–0 win over Israel in Dublin.

11 November 1987 – England seal European Championship qualification with a 4–1 win over Yugoslavia in Belgrade. A Gary McKay goal gives Scotland a 1–0 win in Bulgaria, a result that allows the Republic of Ireland, managed by former 1966 World Cup winner Jack Charlton, to qualify for their first major tournament.

19 November 1987 – Liverpool reject an offer from Bayern Munich for Danish midfielder Jan Molby. Aston Villa boost their Second Division promotion quest with a £150,000 move for Crystal Palace midfielder Andy Gray.

20 November 1987 – Elton John agrees to sell Watford to Robert Maxwell's British Printing and Communication Corporation for £2million.

26 November 1987 – The takeover of Watford falls through after the High Court vetoes it due to Robert Maxwell already being the owner of Derby County.

30 November 1987 – Liverpool lead the First Division by five points from Arsenal. Charlton Athletic, Norwich City and Watford continue to occupy the relegation places. Middlesbrough and Bradford City are level at the top of the Second Division on 43 points. Aston Villa, Hull City and Crystal Palace occupy the play-off places.

7 December 1987 – Queens Park Rangers sign striker Mark Falco from Rangers for £350,000.

7 December 1987 – Everton and Rangers draw 2–2 in the Dubai Champions Cup, with the Scottish club winning on penalties.

9 December 1987 – Eight football hooligans, all either Manchester United or West Ham United supporters, receive prison sentences totalling 51 years at Chelmsford Crown Court after being found guilty of public order offences on a Sealink ferry bound for Amsterdam on 8 August 1986. Meanwhile, Chelsea look to the future with the acquisition of Jersey-born defender Graeme Le Saux, 19.

13 December 1987 – Nigel Clough scores a hat-trick in less than five minutes as Nottingham Forest beat Queens Park Rangers 4–0 in the First Division game at the City Ground.

16 December 1987 – Manchester United pay £900,000 for Norwich City central defender Steve Bruce, with his old club using £580,000 of the transfer to sign Robert Fleck from Rangers.

26 December 1987 – Boxing Day sees Nottingham Forest win 2–0 at Highbury to overtake Arsenal into second place, while in a London derby Wimbledon beat West Ham United 2–1, and David Pleat's tenure as Leicester City manager starts with defeat to AFC Bournemouth.

29 December 1987 – Queens Park Rangers defender Terry Fenwick completes a £550,000 transfer to Tottenham Hotspur.

31 December 1987 – The year draws to a close with Liverpool holding a commanding ten-point lead over second-placed Nottingham Forest. Watford have slipped to the foot of the table, level on points with Charlton Athletic. Portsmouth occupy the final automatic relegation place. Graeme Souness signs Aston Villa midfielder Mark Walters for Rangers for £550,000 in the latest of several moves for English players. In the Second Division, Middlesbrough lead with a one-point margin over Bradford City. A four-point margin separates their nearest six challengers – Aston Villa, Crystal Palace, Millwall, Hull City, Manchester City and Ipswich Town.

1 January 1988 – Out of favour Arsenal striker Charlie Nicholas returns to his native Scotland in a £500,000 move to Aberdeen. Billy Bonds of West Ham United, the oldest Football League player at 41, is awarded an MBE.

4 January 1988 – John Wark returns to Ipswich Town from Liverpool in a £100,000 deal.

11 January 1988 – Dave Bassett is sacked after just six months in charge of Watford, who are currently bottom of the First Division. He is succeeded by Aston Villa assistant manager Steve Harrison.

16 January 1988 – John Aldridge becomes the first player to reach the 20-goal mark in the First Division when he scores in Liverpool's 2–0 home win over Arsenal.

20 January 1988 – Oxford United, winners of the 1986 League Cup, reach the semi-finals of this season's competition with a surprise 2–0 win over Manchester United in the quarter-finals.

22 January 1988 – Manchester City boost their Second Division promotion challenge with a £175,000 move for Northampton Town striker Trevor Morley.

24 January 1988 – Arsenal pay Stoke City £400,000 for 23-year-old right-back Lee Dixon.

26 January 1988 – Aston Villa boost their Second Division promotion challenge with the £200,000 acquisition of highly rated Crewe Alexandra midfielder David Platt, 21.

30 January 1988 – FA Cup holders Coventry City are knocked out by Watford in the fourth round. Last year's defeated finalists Tottenham Hotspur are also eliminated, losing 2–1 at Third Division Port Vale.

31 January 1988 – Liverpool remain top of the First Division as January draws to a close, now 16 points ahead of second-placed Manchester United. Charlton Athletic, Watford and Oxford United make up the bottom three. Aston Villa have crept to the top of the Second Division, while Crystal Palace have risen to second place. Middlesbrough, Millwall and Blackburn Rovers occupy the play-off zone, while Bradford City have slid from second to sixth place in the space of a few weeks. Leicester City, relegated from the First Division last season, are now in the Second Division relegation play-off places.

3 February 1988 – Former Tottenham Hotspur manager Keith Burkinshaw is sacked by Sporting Lisbon of Portugal.

4 February 1988 – Tommy Docherty is sacked after just over four months in charge of GM Vauxhall Conference side Altrincham.

5 February 1988 – A UEFA referendum decides that all English clubs will be banned from European competition for a fourth successive season. Derby County sign midfielder Ted McMinn from Seville of Spain for £300,000.

12 February 1988 – 18 of the 25 Liverpool fans charged with manslaughter in connection with the Heysel disaster return home after being cleared of the charges.

16 February 1988 – Liverpool sell striker Paul Walsh to Tottenham Hotspur for £500,000.

20 February 1988 – Shrewsbury Town striker Jim Melrose, on loan from Leeds United, suffers a broken cheekbone in a clash with Swindon Town midfielder Chris Kamara at the end of Shrewsbury's 2–1 win over Swindon in the Second Division at Gay Meadow. In a heavyweight clash in the FA Cup fifth round, Arsenal beat Manchester United 2–1 at Highbury.

21 February 1988 – Liverpool avenge their League Cup defeat earlier in the season by beating Everton 1–0 in the FA Cup fifth round at Goodison Park.

25 February 1988 – Tottenham Hotspur sign goalkeeper Bobby Mimms from Everton for £325,000. Swindon Town fine midfielder Chris Kamara £1,000 and ban him from playing for a month following the incident with Jim Melrose.

28 February 1988 – Luton Town reach the League Cup final with a 3–1 aggregate win over Oxford United.

29 February 1988 – February draws to a close with Liverpool still top of the league having stretched their unbeaten start to the season to 27 games, and with a 14-point lead over Manchester United with two games in hand. The Second Division promotion race sees Aston Villa and Blackburn Rovers level at the top of the table, with Millwall, Middlesbrough and Bradford City occupying the play-off places.

3 March 1988 – Norwich City sign defender Andy Linighan from Oldham Athletic for £300,000.

4 March 1988 – After seven months at Portsmouth, Ian Baird returns to Leeds United for £120,000.

12 March 1988 – Luton Town edge closer to a remarkable cup double by defeating Portsmouth 3–1 in the FA Cup quarter-final at Kenilworth Road, while Wimbledon's hopes of a first Cup final appearance move closer to reality with a 2–1 win over Watford. Arsenal blow their hopes of a cup double by losing 2–1 at home to Nottingham Forest. Maurice Evans resigns as manager of struggling Oxford United.

13 March 1988 – Liverpool move closer to a unique second double by thrashing Manchester City 4–0 in the FA Cup quarter-final at Maine Road.

18 March 1988 – West Ham United sign Fulham striker Leroy Rosenior for £275,000.

20 March 1988 – Liverpool's unbeaten start to the league season is ended when they lose 1–0 in their 30th match to neighbours Everton.

22 March 1988 – John Hollins resigns as Chelsea manager and is replaced by his assistant Bobby Campbell.

23 March 1988 – Arsenal sign winger Brian Marwood from Sheffield Wednesday for £600,000, while Trevor Francis ends his brief spell with Glasgow Rangers to join Queens Park Rangers on a free transfer.

24 March 1988 – Nottingham Forest pay Preston North End £150,000 for 18-year-old striker Nigel Jemson. Liverpool defender Mark Lawrenson retires from playing after an injury at the age of 30 and is appointed manager of Oxford United.

25 March 1988 – Chelsea sign goalkeeper Kevin Hitchcock from Mansfield Town for £250,000.

27 March 1988 – Luton Town's hopes of a cup treble are ended when they are beaten 4–1 by Second Division strugglers Reading in the Full Members' Cup final at Wembley.

31 March 1988 – Liverpool finish March with a 14-point margin over second-placed Manchester United at the top of the First Division. At the bottom, Watford are eight points from safety with eight matches left, and Oxford United and Portsmouth are also struggling in the relegation zone. Aston Villa remain top of the Second Division with a two-point margin over Blackburn Rovers, with the play-off places being occupied by Middlesbrough, Millwall and Bradford City. Leeds United, Crystal Palace and Stoke City remain in strong contention for promotion as well.

2 April 1988 – Brian McClair scores a hat-trick in Manchester United's 4–1 home win over Derby County to bring his league tally for the season to 19 goals.

4 April 1988 – Manchester United draw 3–3 with Liverpool at Anfield after being 3–1 down, but remain eleven points behind the Merseysiders in the League table.

9 April 1988 – Liverpool move closer to an unprecedented second double by beating Nottingham Forest 2–1 in the FA Cup semi-final at Hillsborough. Wimbledon end Luton Town's cup double hopes with a 2–1 win at White Hart Lane to reach the final for the first time. In the league, 17-year-old Alan Shearer becomes the youngest hat-trick scorer in the First Division in Southampton's 4–2 home win over Arsenal.

13 April 1988 – Hull City sack manager Brian Horton. Liverpool and Nottingham Forest do battle for the third time in twelve days, and just as four days ago, the Merseysiders come out on top, as they win 5–0.

16–17 April 1988 – The Football League programme is put on hold for a week as the Football League Centenary Tournament is staged at Wembley Stadium between 16 clubs on the 100th anniversary of the league's foundation. Nottingham Forest are the winners of the two-day event.

18 April 1988 – Torquay United winger Lee Sharpe, who turns 17 next month, agrees to sign for Manchester United at the end of the season in a £30,000 deal. Hearts striker John Robertson agrees to join Newcastle United for a club record £750,000 at the end of the season. The Football Association suspends Chris Kamara for the rest of the season.

23 April 1988 – Liverpool's 1–0 win over Tottenham Hotspur confirms the Reds as League champions. Watford are relegated thanks to Charlton Athletic's 2–0 win over Newcastle United.

24 April 1988 – Holders Arsenal are beaten 3–2 by Luton Town in a dramatic League Cup final at Wembley. It is Luton's first major trophy.

30 April 1988 – Oxford United are relegated after defeat against Newcastle United. Portsmouth are favourites for the last automatic relegation place, trailing West Ham United by four points with two matches left. The promotion issues in the Second Division have yet to be confirmed, with just four points separating the top five clubs – Millwall, Aston Villa, Bradford City, Middlesbrough and Blackburn Rovers. Derby County goalkeeper Peter Shilton, 38, sets a new Football League appearance record when he makes his 825th league appearance since his debut 21 years ago in his side's 1–1 draw at Watford.

1 May 1988 – Sunderland win promotion back to the Second Division at the first attempt with a 1–0 win over Port Vale at Vale Park.

2 May 1988 – Portsmouth lose 2–1 at home to Newcastle United and are relegated from the First Division after just one season. Millwall clinch the Second Division title with a 1–0 win over Hull City at Boothferry Park and reach the First Division for the first time in their history.

7 May 1988 – On the final full day of the First Division season, Charlton Athletic stay up with a 1–1 draw at Chelsea, a result that sends their opponents into the relegation play-offs.

9 May 1988 – Liverpool finish their League campaign with a 1–1 draw against Luton Town. John Aldridge finishes the season as the First Division's top scorer with 27 league strikes for Liverpool, and 30 in all competitions. Brian McClair of Manchester United, the division's next highest scorer, scores twice against Wimbledon to take his league tally to 24.

10 May 1988 – Tottenham Hotspur sell striker Clive Allen to Bordeaux of France for £1 million. 75-year-old Portsmouth chairman John Deacon sells the club to Jim Gregory for £2million.

11 May 1988 – Aberdeen goalkeeper Jim Leighton links up with his former manager Alex Ferguson by signing for Manchester United in a £500,000 deal.

14 May 1988 – Wimbledon pull off a major upset by beating Liverpool 1–0 in the FA Cup final. They have been First Division members for just two seasons and have only been a Football League side for the last eleven years. Lawrie Sanchez is Wimbledon's goalscoring hero, while Liverpool have a goal from Peter Beardsley disallowed and a penalty from John Aldridge saved by Wimbledon goalkeeper and captain Dave Beasant.

20 May 1988 – Kevin Clarke, 30, is sentenced to three years in prison after being found guilty of being the ring leader of a notorious gang of Oxford United hooligans who were involved in running battles with rivals fans, often in busy shopping areas.

22 May 1988 – Argentine midfielder Ossie Ardiles is given a free transfer by Tottenham Hotspur after 10 years at the club.

26 May 1988 – Aston Villa prepare for their First Division comeback by signing Derek Mountfield from Everton for £425,000 and Chris Price from Blackburn Rovers for £150,000.

28 May 1988 – Middlesbrough are promoted to the First Division, taking the place of Chelsea, whom they beat 2–1 on aggregate in the play-off final.

29 May 1988 – Wolverhampton Wanderers lift the Associate Members' Cup with a 2–0 win over Burnley in front of more than 80,000 fans at Wembley.

1 June 1988 – Sheffield Wednesday sell striker Lee Chapman to Niort of France for £350,000.

6 June 1988 – Arthur Albiston, Manchester United's longest serving player, links up with former United boss Ron Atkinson at West Bromwich Albion on a free transfer after 15 years at Old Trafford.

8 June 1988 – Dave Beasant completes a £750,000 transfer from Wimbledon to Newcastle United, making him the costliest goalkeeper in English football.

10 June 1988 – Tottenham Hotspur sign Paul Stewart from Manchester City for £1.5 million – a record fee for a Second Division player.

12 June 1988 – England's European Championship campaign begins with a 1–0 defeat to the Republic of Ireland.

15 June 1988 – England's chances of progressing to the semi-finals of the European Championships are ended by a 3–1 defeat to the Netherlands. Everton sign Bradford City midfielder Stuart McCall for £850,000.

15 June 1988 – Everton pay £850,000 for Bradford City and Scotland midfielder Stuart McCall.

17 June 1988 – Newcastle United bolster their attack with a £500,000 move for Bradford City striker John Hendrie.

18 June 1988 – England's final group match at the European Championship Finals ends in a third defeat, 3–1 to the USSR.

21 June 1988 – Tottenham Hotspur pay a club record £1.7 million for Manchester City striker Paul Stewart.

23 June 1988 – Eighteen Scarborough hooligans receive prison sentences of up to 12 months for their part in clashes with Wolverhampton Wanderers fans at the club's very first Football League game in August.

24 June 1988 – Watford striker Luther Blissett agrees to stay with the club for at least one more season despite their relegation to the Second Division.

29 June 1988 – Millwall prepare for their first season as a top division club by re-signing defender Neil Ruddock from Tottenham Hotspur for £300,000.

== National team ==
England were eliminated from Euro 88, held in West Germany, after losing all three group matches. The tournament was eventually won by the Netherlands. In spite of continued calls from the tabloids for a new manager, the FA kept faith in Bobby Robson once more.

== FA Cup ==
Wimbledon caused one of the biggest footballing upsets of the 20th century by defeating champions Liverpool 1–0 in the FA Cup final. Wimbledon had only been league members for 11 years and First Division members for two years, while Liverpool had just wrapped up their 17th league championship. Lawrie Sanchez headed the only goal from a Dennis Wise free-kick in the first half of the final, while Dave Beasant became the first player to save a penalty in an FA Cup final (saving from John Aldridge, who had scored all 11 other penalties he had taken that season) and the first goalkeeper to captain an FA Cup-winning side.

== League Cup ==
Ray Harford's Luton Town achieved a shock 3–2 win over Arsenal in the League Cup final to win their first-ever major trophy. Harford had only been promoted to the manager's seat from assistant manager a year earlier as successor to John Moore.

== Football League ==
=== First Division ===
Liverpool won their 17th First Division title with just two league defeats all season and enjoying a record 29-match unbeaten start to the league season, which had seen them looking uncatchable since before Christmas. They finished nine points ahead of their nearest rivals Manchester United, who made impressive progress in their first full season under the management of Alex Ferguson. Nottingham Forest enjoyed their best season for four years as they finished third, while Everton and QPR completed the top five and Arsenal finished sixth, suffering a shock defeat to Luton Town in the League Cup final.

Seventh-placed Wimbledon, in their second season in the First Division and their 11th in the league, beat Liverpool 1–0 in the FA Cup final to deny the Merseysiders a unique second double.

Oxford United's three-year stay in the First Division came to an end with relegation in bottom place, while Watford failed miserably in the aftermath of Graham Taylor's departure and went down after six years among the elite. Portsmouth's first top flight season since the 1950s ended in relegation, while Chelsea went down after losing to Middlesbrough in the play-offs.

Unusually, the division was composed of an odd number of clubs this season. This meant that each week, one club would not play a game.

Pos	Team	Pld	W	D	L	GF	GA	GD	Pts	Qualification or relegation
1	Liverpool (C)	40	26	12	2	87	24	+63	90	Qualified for the Football League Centenary Trophy and disqualified from the European Cup
2	Manchester United	40	23	12	5	71	38	+33	81	Qualified for the Football League Centenary Trophy and disqualified from UEFA Cup
3	Nottingham Forest	40	20	13	7	67	39	+28	73	Qualified for the Football League Centenary Trophy
4	Everton	40	19	13	8	53	27	+26	70	Qualified for the Football League Centenary Trophy
5	Queens Park Rangers	40	19	10	11	48	38	+10	67	Qualified for the Football League Centenary Trophy
6	Arsenal	40	18	12	10	58	39	+19	66	Qualified for the Football League Centenary Trophy
7	Wimbledon (Note: Wimbledon would have qualified as FA Cup winners.)	40	14	15	11	58	47	+11	57	Qualified for the Football League Centenary Trophy and disqualified from the European Cup Winners' Cup
8	Newcastle United	40	14	14	12	55	53	+2	56	Qualified for the Football League Centenary Trophy
9	Luton Town (Note: Luton Town would have qualified as League Cup winners.)	40	14	11	15	57	58	−1	53	Disqualified from the UEFA Cup
10	Coventry City	40	13	14	13	46	53	−7	53	
11	Sheffield Wednesday	40	15	8	17	52	66	−14	53	
12	Southampton	40	12	14	14	49	53	−4	50	
13	Tottenham Hotspur	40	12	11	17	38	48	−10	47	
14	Norwich City	40	12	9	19	40	52	−12	45	
15	Derby County	40	10	13	17	35	45	−10	43	
16	West Ham United	40	9	15	16	40	52	−12	42	
17	Charlton Athletic	40	9	15	16	38	52	−14	42	
18	Chelsea (R)	40	9	15	16	50	68	−18	42	Qualified for Second Division play-offs
19	Portsmouth (R)	40	7	14	19	36	66	−30	35	Relegated to Second Division
20	Watford (R)	40	7	11	22	27	51	−24	32	Relegated to Second Division
21	Oxford United (R)	40	6	13	21	44	80	−36	31	Relegated to Second Division

Source: World Football
Rules for classification: 1) Points; 2) Goal difference; 3) Goals scored
(C) Champions; (R) Relegated

==== Second Division play-offs ====
Semi-finals; 1st leg – 15 May; 2nd leg – 18 May 1988
Blackburn Rovers	0	1	1
Chelsea	2	4	6
Bradford City	2	0	2
Middlesbrough	1	2	3

Final; 1st leg – 25 May; 2nd leg – 28 May 1988
Chelsea	0	1	1
Middlesbrough	2	0	2

=== Second Division ===
A tight Second Division promotion race ended with Millwall as champions and promoted to the First Division for the first time in their history. Aston Villa were promoted on goals scored ahead of Middlesbrough, who triumphed in the play-offs to secure a second successive promotion a mere two years after they had almost gone out of business. Bradford City, another club faced with closure a few years earlier, also qualified for the play-offs, as did Blackburn Rovers.

Huddersfield Town's catastrophic season ended in relegation after a mere six wins and 28 points. They were joined by Reading, who gained some consolation by winning the Full Members' Cup. Sheffield United went down in the play-offs, while West Bromwich Albion and Birmingham City narrowly avoided their second relegation in three seasons.

Pos	Team	Pld	W	D	L	GF	GA	GD	Pts	Relegation
1	Millwall (C, P)	44	25	7	12	72	52	+20	82	Promotion to the First Division
2	Aston Villa (P)	44	22	12	10	68	41	+27	78	Promotion to the First Division
3	Middlesbrough (O, P)	44	22	12	10	63	36	+27	78	Qualification for the Second Division play-offs
4	Bradford City	44	22	11	11	74	54	+20	77	Qualification for the Second Division play-offs
5	Blackburn Rovers	44	21	14	9	68	52	+16	77	Qualification for the Second Division play-offs
6	Crystal Palace	44	22	9	13	86	59	+27	75	
7	Leeds United	44	19	12	13	61	51	+10	69	
8	Ipswich Town	44	19	9	16	61	52	+9	66	
9	Manchester City	44	19	8	17	80	60	+20	65	
10	Oldham Athletic	44	18	11	15	72	64	+8	65	
11	Stoke City	44	17	11	16	50	57	−7	62	
12	Swindon Town	44	16	11	17	73	60	+13	59	
13	Leicester City	44	16	11	17	62	61	+1	59	
14	Barnsley	44	15	12	17	61	62	−1	57	
15	Hull City	44	14	15	15	54	60	−6	57	
16	Plymouth Argyle	44	16	8	20	65	67	−2	56	
17	Bournemouth	44	13	10	21	56	68	−12	49	
18	Shrewsbury Town	44	11	16	17	42	54	−12	49	
19	Birmingham City	44	11	15	18	41	66	−25	48	
20	West Bromwich Albion	44	12	11	21	50	69	−19	47	
21	Sheffield United (R)	44	13	7	24	45	74	−29	46	Qualification for the Third Division play-offs
22	Reading (R)	44	10	12	22	44	70	−26	42	Relegation to the Third Division
23	Huddersfield Town (R)	44	6	10	28	41	100	−59	28	Relegation to the Third Division

Rules for classification: 1) Points; 2) Goal difference; 3) Goals scored
(C) Champions; (O) Play-off winners; (P) Promoted; (R) Relegated

==== Third Division play-offs ====
Semi-finals; 1st leg – 15 May; 2nd leg – 18 May 1988
21st	Sheffield United	0	1	1
5th	Bristol City	1	1	2
3rd	Walsall	3	1	4
4th	Notts County	1	1	2

Final; 1st leg – 25 May; 2nd leg – 28 May 1988; replay – 30 May 1988
3rd	Walsall	3	0	4
5th	Bristol City	1	2	0

=== Third Division ===
Sunderland sealed the Third Division title by a comfortable margin in their first season at this level to secure an instant return to the Second Division. Runners-up Brighton also secured an instant return to the Second Division, while the third promotion place was taken by play-off winners Walsall.

Doncaster Rovers and York City propped up the Third Division to suffer relegation after four seasons at this level, while debt-ridden Grimsby Town suffered a second successive relegation. Rotherham United went down in the play-offs. Newly promoted Aldershot narrowly survived their first season at this level for over a decade.

Pos	Team	Pld	W	D	L	GF	GA	GD	Pts	Relegation
1	Sunderland (C, P)	46	27	12	7	92	48	+44	93	Promotion to the Second Division
2	Brighton & Hove Albion (P)	46	23	15	8	69	47	+22	84	Promotion to the Second Division
3	Walsall (O, P)	46	23	13	10	68	50	+18	82	Qualification for the Third Division play-offs
4	Notts County	46	23	12	11	82	49	+33	81	Qualification for the Third Division play-offs
5	Bristol City	46	21	12	13	77	62	+15	75	Qualification for the Third Division play-offs
6	Northampton Town	46	18	19	9	70	51	+19	73	
7	Wigan Athletic	46	20	12	14	70	61	+9	72	
8	Bristol Rovers	46	18	12	16	68	56	+12	66	
9	Fulham	46	19	9	18	69	60	+9	66	
10	Blackpool	46	17	14	15	71	62	+9	65	
11	Port Vale	46	18	11	17	58	56	+2	65	
12	Brentford	46	16	14	16	53	59	−6	62	
13	Gillingham	46	14	17	15	77	61	+16	59	
14	Bury	46	15	14	17	58	57	+1	59	
15	Chester City	46	14	16	16	51	62	−11	58	
16	Preston North End	46	15	13	18	48	59	−11	58	
17	Southend United	46	14	13	19	65	83	−18	55	
18	Chesterfield	46	15	10	21	41	70	−29	55	
19	Mansfield Town	46	14	12	20	48	59	−11	54	
20	Aldershot	46	15	8	23	64	74	−10	53	
21	Rotherham United (R)	46	12	16	18	50	66	−16	52	Qualification for the Fourth Division play-offs
22	Grimsby Town (R)	46	12	14	20	48	58	−10	50	Relegation to the Fourth Division
23	York City (R)	46	8	9	29	48	91	−43	33	Relegation to the Fourth Division
24	Doncaster Rovers (R)	46	8	9	29	40	84	−44	33	Relegation to the Fourth Division

Rules for classification: 1) Points; 2) Goal difference; 3) Goals scored
(C) Champions; (O) Play-off winners; (P) Promoted; (R) Relegated

==== Fourth Division play-offs ====
Semi-finals; 1st leg – 15 May; 2nd leg – 18 May 1988
21st	Rotherham United	0	1	1
6th	Swansea City	1	1	2
4th	Scunthorpe United	1	1	2
5th	Torquay United	2	1	3

Finals; 1st leg – 25 May; 2nd leg – 28 May 1988
6th	Swansea City	2	3	5
5th	Torquay United	1	3	4

=== Fourth Division ===
Wolverhampton Wanderers clinched the Fourth Division title, the Associate Members' Cup and promotion to the Third Division at the end of a season where striker Steve Bull found the net 52 times in all competitions. They were joined in promotion by Cardiff City and Swansea City as well as Bolton Wanderers, who had their first successful season for a decade.

Debt-ridden Newport County moved closer to oblivion, losing their league status with just 25 points to suffer a second successive relegation and find themselves being forced into non-league football a mere five years after being on the brink of the Second Division and seven years after playing in the quarter finals of the European Cup Winners' Cup. Their relegation would prove the beginning of the end for this incarnation of the club, who folded before the end of the following season and were subsequently forced to reform for the 1989–90 season.

Scunthorpe United left the Old Showground and moved into Glanford Park, thus becoming the first English club in more than 30 years to move to a new stadium.

Pos	Team	Pld	W	D	L	GF	GA	GD	Pts	Promotion or relegation
1	Wolverhampton Wanderers (C, P)	46	27	9	10	82	43	+39	90	Promotion to the Third Division
2	Cardiff City (P)	46	24	13	9	66	41	+25	85	Cup Winners' Cup first round and promotion to the Third Division
3	Bolton Wanderers (P)	46	22	12	12	66	42	+24	78	Promotion to the Third Division
4	Scunthorpe United	46	20	17	9	76	51	+25	77	Qualification for the Fourth Division play-offs
5	Torquay United	46	21	14	11	66	41	+25	77	Qualification for the Fourth Division play-offs
6	Swansea City (O, P)	46	20	10	16	62	56	+6	70	Qualification for the Fourth Division play-offs
7	Peterborough United	46	20	10	16	52	53	−1	70	
8	Leyton Orient	46	19	12	15	85	63	+22	69	
9	Colchester United	46	19	10	17	47	51	−4	67	
10	Burnley	46	20	7	19	57	62	−5	67	
11	Wrexham	46	20	6	20	69	58	+11	66	
12	Scarborough	46	17	14	15	56	48	+8	65	
13	Darlington	46	18	11	17	71	69	+2	65	
14	Tranmere Rovers	46	19	9	18	61	53	+8	64 (Note: Tranmere Rovers were deducted two points.)	
15	Cambridge United	46	16	13	17	50	52	−2	61	
16	Hartlepool United	46	15	14	17	50	57	−7	59	
17	Crewe Alexandra	46	13	19	14	57	53	+4	58	
18	Halifax Town	46	14	14	18	54	59	−5	55 (Note: Halifax Town were deducted one point.)	
19	Hereford United	46	14	12	20	41	59	−18	54	
20	Stockport County	46	12	15	19	44	58	−14	51	
21	Rochdale	46	11	15	20	47	76	−29	48	
22	Exeter City	46	11	13	22	53	68	−15	46	
23	Carlisle United	46	12	8	26	57	86	−29	44	
24	Newport County (R)	46	6	7	33	35	105	−70	25	Relegation to the Football Conference

(C) Champions; (O) Play-off winners; (P) Promoted; (R) Relegated

=== Top goalscorers ===
First Division

- John Aldridge (Liverpool) – 26 goals

Second Division

- David Currie (Barnsley) – 28 goals

Third Division

- David Crown (Southend United) – 26 goals

Fourth Division

- Steve Bull (Wolverhampton Wanderers) – 34 goals

== Non-league football ==
The divisional champions of the major non-League competitions were:

Competition	Winners
Football Conference	Lincoln City
Isthmian League	Yeovil Town
Northern Premier League	Chorley
Southern League	Aylesbury United
FA Trophy	Enfield
FA Vase	Colne Dynamoes

== Star players ==
Liverpool's high scoring winger John Barnes was voted both PFA Players' Player of the Year and FWA Footballer of the Year in his first season at Anfield.

Newcastle United's midfielder Paul Gascoigne was voted PFA Young Player of the Year before being transferred to Tottenham Hotspur.

Brian McClair scored 25 First Division goals for runners-up Manchester United in his first season at Old Trafford following his move from Celtic.

Liverpool striker John Aldridge was top scorer in the league and collected a championship medal in his first full season at the club, but missed the penalty in the FA Cup final that cost his side the chance of a unique second double.

West Ham United striker Tony Cottee had another high scoring season before being transferred to Everton.

Steve Bull scored 52 goals in all competitions (37 in the league) for Fourth Division champions Wolverhampton Wanderers.

Young midfielder David Platt had an excellent first season for Aston Villa, establishing himself as a competent goalscorer as well as gaining promotion to the First Division.

== Star managers ==
- Liverpool manager Kenny Dalglish added the league title to his managerial CV to bring his total of championships to two in three seasons and Liverpool's all-time total to 17.
- Alex Ferguson's efforts in rebuilding Manchester United saw them finish second in the league just 18 months after they had looked in danger of relegation.
- Bobby Gould guided Wimbledon to a shock victory over Liverpool in the FA Cup final.
- Ray Harford earned Luton Town the first major trophy of their history by guiding them to victory over Arsenal in the League Cup final.
- Graham Taylor's first season at Aston Villa ended in promotion to the First Division at the expense of his old club Watford.
- John Docherty brought First Division football to Millwall for the first time in their history.
- Bruce Rioch took Middlesbrough to the First Division just two years after financial problems almost put the club out of business.
- Denis Smith began Sunderland's revival by guiding them to the Third Division title.
- Graham Turner guided Wolverhampton Wanderers to Fourth Division title glory which made them the first club to win all four divisions of the Football League.
- Phil Neal ensured that Bolton Wanderers bounced back quickly from their recent sharp decline by taking them to third place in the Fourth Division.

== Famous debutants ==
- 12 September 1987: Tim Sherwood, 18-year-old midfielder, makes his debut for Watford as a substitute in the First Division 3-2 defeat by Sheffield Wednesday at Hillsborough.
- 26 September 1987: Rod Wallace, 17-year-old striker, makes his debut for Southampton as a substitute in the First Division 2–1 defeat by Newcastle United at St James' Park.
- 7 November 1987: Michael O'Neill, 18-year-old Northern Irish striker and A-Level student, makes his debut for Newcastle United in 4–0 defeat by Luton Town in the First Division at Kenilworth Road.
- 19 March 1988: Kevin Pressman, 20-year-old goalkeeper, makes his debut for Sheffield Wednesday in a 1-0 win against Portsmouth at Hillsborough.
- 26 March 1988: Alan Shearer, 17-year-old striker, makes his debut for Southampton against Chelsea.
- 7 May 1988: Kevin Campbell, 18-year-old striker, makes his debut for Arsenal in 2–1 win over Everton in First Division at Goodison Park.
- 9 May 1988: Lee Martin, 20-year-old defender, makes his debut for Manchester United in 2–1 First Division win over Wimbledon at Old Trafford.

== Retirements ==
January 1988: Mark Lawrenson, 30-year-old Liverpool and Republic of Ireland defender, retires from playing due an Achilles injury.

May 1988: Craig Johnston, 27-year-old Liverpool midfielder, retires from playing to care for his seriously ill sister in Australia.

== Deaths ==
- 18 September 1987: Fred Chadwick, 74, was top scorer for Ipswich Town in their first season as a Football League team (1938–39). Manchester-born Chadwick also played for Newport County and Bristol Rovers as a centre-forward.
- 16 October 1987: Lady Blanche Cobbold, 89, served Ipswich Town as the only female vice president of a Football League club, of which her son Patrick was chairman. She was widowed in World War II and regularly attended the club's matches for nearly 50 years until 1985.
- 19 October 1987: Ernie Toseland, 82, played 368 league games as an outside-right for Manchester City between 1928 and 1938, scoring 61 goals and winning a league title and FA Cup. After leaving Maine Road he signed for Sheffield Wednesday, but his playing career was cut short by the outbreak of war the following year.
- 23 October 1987: Jimmy Mullen, 64, spent his entire playing career at Wolverhampton Wanderers, winning three league titles and an FA Cup between his debut in 1937 and retirement in 1960. Tyneside-born Mullen, who played as a winger, scored 98 goals in 445 league games for Wolves, and was also capped 12 times at senior level for England, scoring six goals.
- 1 November 1987: Tom Parker, 89, won a solitary England cap in 1925 and played more than 500 league games in a professional career which stretched from 1919 to 1933 and was divided with seven years each at Southampton and then Arsenal. He later managed Norwich City (twice) and Southampton. He later returned to Southampton as a scout, holding the position of chief scout until he retired in his 78th year.
- 7 January 1988: Arthur Atkins, 62, played 97 league games for Birmingham City between 1948 and 1954 before completing his career with 16 games in two seasons at Shrewsbury Town.
- 21 January 1988: George Kidd, 78, who was born in Dundee, Scotland, made 134 league appearances as a forward for Charlton Athletic, Gillingham and Luton Town between 1931 and 1936.
- 27 January 1988: Cyril Bridge, 78, played 155 league games at left-back for Bristol City in the 1930s.
- 28 February 1988: Norman Brunskill, 75, played 237 league games at wing-half for Oldham Athletic, Birmingham City and Barnsley between 1932 and 1947.
- 4 March 1988: Bobby Etheridge, 52, played 259 league games and scored 42 goals as a wing-half for Bristol City between 1956 and 1964.
- 13 March 1988: Ray Warren, 69, spent his entire 20-year playing career at Bristol Rovers, making 450 appearances for the West Country club between 1936 and 1956, scoring 28 goals from defence.
- 1 April 1988: Tom Williamson, 87, who was born in Scotland and died in Norwich, played 253 times in the English league for Blackburn Rovers, Stoke City and Norwich City between 1922 and 1933.
- 13 April 1988: Martin McDonnell, 63, played 412 league games between 1946 and 1960 for Everton, Southport, Birmingham City, Coventry City, Derby County and Crewe Alexandra.
- 13 May 1988: Elfed Evans, 61, played 122 league games as a forward for Cardiff City, Torquay United, West Bromwich, Wrexham and Southport between 1949 and 1957.
- 24 July 1988: John Harris, 71, played 326 league games in defence for Chelsea between 1946 and 1956, including their league title triumph in 1955. He then became manager of Chester, before managing Sheffield United, taking the South Yorkshire club to promotion to the First Division in 1971 and remaining in charge for another two years, preserving their status among the elite. After retiring from football, he worked as a lay preacher.
