= 1987–88 Essex Senior Football League =

The 1987–88 season was the 17th in the history of Essex Senior Football League, a football competition in England.

The league featured 15 clubs which competed in the league last season, along with two new clubs:

- Coggeshall Town, joined from the Reserve division
- Woodford Town, resigned from the Southern Football League

Purfleet were champions, winning their first Essex Senior League title and were promoted to the Isthmian League.

== League table ==
Essex Senior Football League
- Season: 1987–88
- Champions: Purfleet
- Promoted: Purfleet
- Matches: 272
- Goals: 925 (3.4 per match)

Pos	Team	Pld	W	D	L	GF	GA	GD	Pts	Promotion or relegation
1	Purfleet	32	23	4	5	76	24	+52	73	Promoted to the Isthmian League
2	Brentwood	32	22	5	5	84	36	+48	71	
3	Halstead Town	32	19	6	7	79	38	+41	63	Transferred to the Eastern Counties League
4	Woodford Town	32	19	6	7	61	27	+34	63	
5	East Thurrock United	32	17	7	8	73	39	+34	58	
6	Ford United	32	16	4	12	45	42	+3	52	
7	Stansted	32	15	6	11	58	45	+13	51	
8	Sawbridgeworth Town	32	14	7	11	67	51	+16	49	
9	Eton Manor	32	14	5	13	52	48	+4	47	
10	Canvey Island	32	12	8	12	53	53	0	44	
11	Brightlingsea United	32	11	9	12	58	57	+1	42	
12	Chelmsford City reserves	32	13	3	16	47	53	−6	42	
13	Burnham Ramblers	32	9	8	15	52	60	−8	35	
14	Bowers United	32	9	7	16	30	53	−23	34	
15	East Ham United	32	9	4	19	44	80	−36	31	
16	Maldon Town	32	2	1	29	24	98	−74	7	
17	Coggeshall Town	32	1	4	27	22	121	−99	7	

Source: fchd
Rules for classification: 1) points; 2) goal difference; 3) number of goals scored.
