= 1986–87 Essex Senior Football League =

The 1986–87 season was the 16th in the history of Essex Senior Football League, a football competition in England.

The league featured 15 clubs which competed in the league last season, along with two new clubs:

- Purfleet, joined from the Reserve division
- Woodford Town reserves

Canvey Island won their first Essex Senior League title, while Witham Town were promoted to the Isthmian League.

== League table ==
Essex Senior Football League
- Season: 1986–87
- Champions: Canvey Island
- Promoted: Witham Town
- Matches: 272
- Goals: 828 (3.04 per match)

Pos	Team	Pld	W	D	L	GF	GA	GD	Pts	Promotion or relegation
1	Canvey Island	32	22	4	6	62	32	+30	70	
2	Witham Town	32	19	6	7	58	22	+36	63	Promoted to the Isthmian League
3	Purfleet	32	18	7	7	83	40	+43	61	
4	Bowers United	32	17	7	8	62	33	+29	58	
5	East Thurrock United	32	15	10	7	62	45	+17	55	
6	Burnham Ramblers	32	14	9	9	49	36	+13	51	
7	Woodford Town reserves	32	14	9	9	50	38	+12	51	Resigned from the league
8	Sawbridgeworth Town	32	14	5	13	53	57	−4	47	
9	Chelmsford City reserves	32	13	7	12	51	42	+9	46	
10	Brentwood	32	12	10	10	50	48	+2	46	
11	Halstead Town	32	12	9	11	41	37	+4	45	
12	Ford United	32	7	13	12	40	43	−3	33 (Note: Ford United were deducted one point.)	
13	Eton Manor	32	7	8	17	36	59	−23	29	
14	Stansted	32	6	6	20	30	81	−51	24	
15	Maldon Town	32	5	8	19	34	66	−32	23	
16	East Ham United	32	5	8	19	40	86	−46	23	
17	Brightlingsea United	32	2	14	16	27	63	−36	20	

Source: fchd
Rules for classification: 1) points; 2) goal difference; 3) number of goals scored.
