= 1986–87 Isthmian League =

The 1986–87 season was the 72nd season of the Isthmian League, which is an English football competition featuring semi-professional and amateur clubs from London, East and South East England. League consisted of three divisions. The Second Division was divided into two sections.

Wycombe Wanderers won the league and returned to the Conference at the first attempt.

== Premier Division ==
Isthmian League Premier Division
- Season: 1986–87
- Champions: Wycombe Wanderers
- Promoted: Wycombe Wanderers
- Relegated: Walthamstow Avenue; Worthing
- Matches: 462
- Goals: 1,348 (2.92 per match)

The Premier Division consisted of 22 clubs, including 19 clubs from the previous season and three new clubs:

- Bromley, promoted as runners-up in Division One
- St Albans City, promoted as champions of Division One
- Wycombe Wanderers, relegated from Alliance Premier League

=== League table ===
Pos	Team	Pld	W	D	L	GF	GA	GD	Pts	Promotion or relegation
1	Wycombe Wanderers	42	32	5	5	103	32	+71	101	Promoted to the Football Conference
2	Yeovil Town	42	28	8	6	71	27	+44	92	
3	Slough Town	42	23	8	11	70	44	+26	77	
4	Hendon	42	22	7	13	67	53	+14	73	
5	Bognor Regis Town	42	20	10	12	85	61	+24	70	
6	Harrow Borough	42	20	10	12	68	44	+24	70	
7	Croydon	42	18	10	14	51	48	+3	64	
8	Barking	42	16	14	12	76	56	+20	62	
9	Farnborough Town	42	17	11	14	66	72	−6	62	
10	Bishop's Stortford	42	15	15	12	62	57	+5	60	
11	Bromley	42	16	11	15	63	72	−9	59	
12	Kingstonian	42	16	9	17	58	50	+8	57	
13	Windsor & Eton	42	13	15	14	47	52	−5	54	
14	St Albans City	42	14	9	19	61	70	−9	51	
15	Carshalton Athletic	42	13	9	20	55	68	−13	48	
16	Hayes	42	12	12	18	45	68	−23	48	
17	Wokingham Town	42	14	6	22	47	61	−14	48	
18	Dulwich Hamlet	42	12	10	20	62	71	−9	46	
19	Tooting & Mitcham United	42	12	9	21	41	53	−12	45	
20	Hitchin Town	42	13	5	24	56	69	−13	44	
21	Worthing	42	8	9	25	58	107	−49	33	Relegated to Division One
22	Walthamstow Avenue	42	4	6	32	36	113	−77	18	Relegated to Division One

Source: fchd.com rsssf.com
Rules for classification: 1) points; 2) goal difference; 3) number of goals scored.

=== Stadia and locations ===
Locations of the Premier Division clubs
Greater London Premier Division football clubs
Somerset Premier Division football clubs

Club	Stadium
Barking	Mayesbrook Park
Bishop's Stortford	Woodside Park
Bognor Regis Town	Nyewood Lane
Bromley	Hayes Lane
Carshalton Athletic	War Memorial Sports Ground
Croydon	Croydon Sports Arena
Dulwich Hamlet	Champion Hill
Farnborough Town	Cherrywood Road
Hayes	Church Road
Harrow Borough	Earlsmead Stadium
Hendon	Claremont Road
Hitchin Town	Top Field
Kingstonian	Kingsmeadow
Slough Town	Wexham Park
St Albans City	Clarence Park
Tooting & Mitcham United	Imperial Fields
Walthamstow Avenue	Green Pond Road
Windsor & Eton	Stag Meadow
Wokingham Town	Cantley Park
Worthing	Woodside Road
Wycombe Wanderers	Adams Park
Yeovil Town	Huish Park

== Division One ==
Isthmian League Division One
- Season: 1986–87
- Champions: Leytonstone/Ilford
- Promoted: Leytonstone/Ilford; Leyton-Wingate
- Relegated: Epsom & Ewell; Finchley; Maidenhead United; Tilbury
- Matches: 462
- Goals: 1,311 (2.84 per match)

Division One consisted of 22 clubs, including 16 clubs from the previous season and six new clubs:

Two clubs relegated from the Premier Division:

- Billericay Town
- Epsom & Ewell

Two clubs promoted from Division Two North:

- Kingsbury Town
- Stevenage Borough

Two clubs promoted from Division Two South:

- Bracknell Town
- Southwick

=== League table ===
Pos	Team	Pld	W	D	L	GF	GA	GD	Pts	Promotion or relegation
1	Leytonstone/Ilford	42	30	5	7	78	29	+49	95	Promoted to the Premier Division
2	Leyton-Wingate	42	23	13	6	68	31	+37	82	Promoted to the Premier Division
3	Bracknell Town	42	24	9	9	92	48	+44	81	
4	Southwick	42	23	7	12	80	66	+14	76	
5	Wembley	42	21	9	12	61	47	+14	72	
6	Grays Athletic	42	19	10	13	76	64	+12	67	
7	Kingsbury Town	42	20	7	15	69	67	+2	67	
8	Boreham Wood	42	20	6	16	59	52	+7	66	
9	Uxbridge	42	18	9	15	60	59	+1	63	
10	Leatherhead	42	17	11	14	45	48	−3	62	
11	Hampton	42	18	5	19	57	55	+2	59	
12	Basildon United	42	16	10	16	58	60	−2	58	
13	Billericay Town	42	14	12	16	57	52	+5	54	
14	Staines Town	42	13	13	16	40	51	−11	52	
15	Lewes	42	15	6	21	55	65	−10	51	
16	Stevenage Borough	42	12	11	19	61	67	−6	47	
17	Oxford City	42	11	10	21	64	72	−8	43	
18	Walton & Hersham	42	11	10	21	53	74	−21	43	
19	Tilbury	42	12	7	23	46	70	−24	43	Relegated to Division Two North
20	Epsom & Ewell	42	12	7	23	44	68	−24	43	Relegated to Division Two South
21	Maidenhead United	42	11	4	27	44	76	−32	37	Relegated to Division Two South
22	Finchley	42	6	11	25	44	90	−46	29	Relegated to Division Two North

Source: fchd.com rsssf.com
Rules for classification: 1) points; 2) goal difference; 3) number of goals scored.

=== Stadia and locations ===
Locations of the Division One clubs
Greater London Division One football clubs

Club	Stadium
Basildon United	Gardiners Close
Billericay Town	New Lodge
Boreham Wood	Meadow Park
Bracknell Town	Larges Lane
Epsom & Ewell	Merland Rise
Finchley	Summers Lane
Grays Athletic	New Recreation Ground
Hampton	Beveree Stadium
Kingsbury Town	Avenue Park
Leatherhead	Fetcham Grove
Lewes	The Dripping Pan
Leytonstone/Ilford	Victoria Road
Leyton-Wingate	Wadham Lodge
Maidenhead United	York Road
Oxford City	Marsh Lane
Southwick	Old Barn Way
Staines Town	Wheatsheaf Park
Stevenage Borough	The Lamex Stadium
Tilbury	Chadfields
Uxbridge	Honeycroft
Walton & Hersham	The Sports Ground
Wembley	Vale Farm

== Division Two North ==
Isthmian League Division Two North
- Season: 1986–87
- Champions: Chesham United
- Promoted: Chesham United; Wolverton Town
- Matches: 462
- Goals: 1,326 (2.87 per match)

Division Two North consisted of 22 clubs, including 16 clubs from the previous season and six new clubs:

- Aveley, relegated from Division One
- Chesham United, relegated from Division One
- Collier Row, joined from the London Spartan League
- Harlow Town, relegated from Division One
- Hornchurch, relegated from Division One
- Wivenhoe Town, joined from the Essex Senior League

=== League table ===
Pos	Team	Pld	W	D	L	GF	GA	GD	Pts	Promotion or relegation
1	Chesham United	42	28	6	8	81	48	+33	90	Promoted to Division One
2	Wolverton Town	42	23	14	5	74	32	+42	83	Promoted to Division One
3	Haringey Borough	42	22	13	7	86	40	+46	79	
4	Heybridge Swifts	42	21	11	10	81	54	+27	74	
5	Aveley	42	19	13	10	68	50	+18	70	
6	Letchworth Garden City	42	19	11	12	77	62	+15	68	
7	Barton Rovers	42	18	11	13	49	39	+10	65	
8	Tring Town	42	19	7	16	69	49	+20	64	
9	Collier Row	42	19	5	18	67	65	+2	62	
10	Ware	42	17	8	17	51	50	+1	59	
11	Saffron Walden Town	42	14	14	14	56	54	+2	56	
12	Wivenhoe Town	42	15	11	16	61	61	0	56	
13	Vauxhall Motors	42	15	10	17	61	57	+4	55	
14	Hornchurch	42	13	16	13	60	60	0	55	
15	Hertford Town	42	14	13	15	52	53	−1	55	
16	Berkhamsted Town	42	12	16	14	62	64	−2	52	
17	Harlow Town	42	13	11	18	45	55	−10	50	
18	Rainham Town	42	12	11	19	53	70	−17	47	
19	Clapton	42	10	11	21	45	63	−18	41	
20	Hemel Hempstead	42	9	12	21	48	77	−29	39	
21	Royston Town	42	4	12	26	37	109	−72	24	
22	Cheshunt	42	5	6	31	43	114	−71	21	Resigned and joined the Spartan League

Source: fchd.com rsssf.com
Rules for classification: 1) points; 2) goal difference; 3) number of goals scored.

=== Stadia and locations ===
Locations of the Division Two North clubs
Greater London Division Two North football clubs

Club	Stadium
Aveley	The Mill Field
Barton Rovers	Sharpenhoe Road
Berkhamsted Town	Broadwater
Chesham United	The Meadow
Cheshunt	Cheshunt Stadium
Clapton	The Old Spotted Dog Ground
Collier Row	Sungate
Harlow Town	Harlow Sportcentre
Haringey Borough	Coles Park
Hemel Hempstead	Vauxhall Road
Hertford Town	Hertingfordbury Park
Heybridge Swifts	Scraley Road
Hornchurch	Hornchurch Stadium
Letchworth Garden City	Baldock Road
Rainham Town	Deri Park
Royston Town	Garden Walk
Saffron Walden Town	Catons Lane
Tring Town	Pendley Ground
Vauxhall Motors	Brache Estate
Ware	Wodson Park
Wivenhoe Town	Broad Lane
Wolverton Town	Wolverton Park

== Division Two South ==
Isthmian League Division Two South
- Season: 1986–87
- Champions: Woking
- Promoted: Marlow; Woking
- Matches: 420
- Goals: 1,248 (2.97 per match)

Division Two South consisted of 21 clubs, including 18 clubs from the previous season and three new clubs:

- Chalfont St Peter, transferred from Division Two North
- Chertsey Town, joined from the Combined Counties League
- Harefield United, transferred from Division Two North

=== League table ===
Pos	Team	Pld	W	D	L	GF	GA	GD	Pts	Promotion or relegation
1	Woking	40	27	7	6	110	32	+78	88	Promoted to Division One
2	Marlow	40	28	4	8	78	36	+42	88	Promoted to Division One
3	Dorking	40	24	12	4	78	30	+48	84	
4	Feltham	40	25	3	12	79	34	+45	78	
5	Ruislip Manor	40	22	10	8	85	47	+38	76	
6	Chertsey Town	40	18	11	11	56	44	+12	65	
7	Metropolitan Police	40	16	13	11	70	61	+9	61	
8	Chalfont St Peter	40	17	10	13	60	55	+5	61	
9	Hungerford Town	40	14	14	12	55	48	+7	56	
10	Harefield United	40	14	14	12	53	47	+6	56	
11	Eastbourne United	40	15	10	15	72	59	+13	55	
12	Whyteleafe	40	12	15	13	52	63	−11	51	
13	Horsham	40	14	8	18	54	61	−7	50	
14	Egham Town	40	14	6	20	45	77	−32	48	
15	Camberley Town	40	13	3	24	62	89	−27	42	
16	Flackwell Heath	40	9	11	20	34	63	−29	38	
17	Banstead Athletic	40	7	15	18	44	61	−17	36	
18	Petersfield United	40	9	8	23	45	84	−39	35	
19	Molesey	40	7	12	21	37	89	−52	33	
20	Newbury Town	40	6	14	20	51	83	−32	32	
21	Southall	40	6	6	28	28	85	−57	24	

Source: fchd.com rsssf.com
Rules for classification: 1) points; 2) goal difference; 3) number of goals scored.

=== Stadia and locations ===
Locations of the Division Two South clubs
Greater London Division Two South football clubs

Club	Stadium
Banstead Athletic	Merland Rise
Camberley Town	Kroomer Park
Chalfont St Peter	Mill Meadow
Chertsey Town	Alwyns Lane
Dorking	Meadowbank Stadium
Eastbourne United	The Oval
Egham Town	The Runnymede Stadium
Feltham	The Orchard
Flackwell Heath	Wilks Park
Harefield United	Preston Park
Horsham	Queen Street
Hungerford Town	Bulpit Lane
Marlow	Alfred Davis Memorial Ground
Metropolitan Police	Imber Court
Molesey	Walton Road Stadium
Newbury Town	Town Ground
Petersfield United	The Southdowns Builders Stadium
Ruislip Manor	Grosvenor Vale
Southall	Robert Parker Stadium
Whyteleafe	Church Road
Woking	The Laithwaite Community Stadium

== See also ==
- Isthmian League
- 1986–87 Northern Premier League
- 1986–87 Southern Football League
