= 1986–87 Southern Football League =

The 1986–87 Southern Football League season was the 84th in the history of the league, an English football competition.

Fisher Athletic won the Premier Division and earned promotion to the Football Conference, whilst Basingstoke Town, Leamington and Woodford Town left the league at the end of the season. The Southern League Cup was lifted by Waterlooville, who won both legs of the final against Hednesford Town.

== Premier Division ==
The Premier Division expanded up to 22 clubs, including 17 clubs from the previous season and five new clubs:

- Two clubs promoted from the Midland Division:
  - Bromsgrove Rovers
  - Redditch United
- Two clubs promoted from the Southern Division:
  - Cambridge City
  - Salisbury
- Plus:
  - Dartford, relegated from the Alliance Premier League

=== League table ===
Southern Football League Premier Division
- Season: 1986–87
- Champions: Fisher Athletic
- Promoted: Fisher Athletic
- Relegated: Dudley Town; Folkestone; King's Lynn; Salisbury
- Matches: 462
- Goals: 1,248 (2.7 per match)

Pos	Team	Pld	W	D	L	GF	GA	GD	Pts	Promotion or relegation
1	Fisher Athletic	42	25	11	6	72	29	+43	86	Promoted to the Football Conference
2	Bromsgrove Rovers	42	24	11	7	82	41	+41	83	
3	Aylesbury United	42	24	11	7	72	40	+32	83	
4	Dartford	42	19	12	11	76	43	+33	69	
5	Chelmsford City	42	17	13	12	48	45	+3	64	
6	Cambridge City	42	14	20	8	68	52	+16	62	
7	Redditch United	42	16	14	12	59	54	+5	62	
8	Alvechurch	42	18	8	16	66	62	+4	62	
9	Corby Town	42	14	17	11	65	51	+14	59	
10	Worcester City	42	16	11	15	62	55	+7	59	
11	Shepshed Charterhouse	42	16	10	16	59	59	0	58	
12	Bedworth United	42	15	12	15	55	51	+4	57	
13	Crawley Town	42	14	11	17	59	60	−1	53	
14	Fareham Town	42	11	17	14	58	49	+9	50	
15	Willenhall Town	42	13	11	18	48	57	−9	50	
16	Basingstoke Town	42	12	12	18	53	78	−25	48	Transferred to the Isthmian League Premier Division
17	Witney Town	42	12	12	18	29	56	−27	48	
18	Gosport Borough	42	11	13	18	42	57	−15	46	
19	Salisbury	42	12	7	23	52	82	−30	43	Relegated to the Southern Division
20	King's Lynn	42	9	13	20	48	72	−24	40	Relegated to the Midland Division
21	Dudley Town	42	9	9	24	39	76	−37	36	Relegated to the Midland Division
22	Folkestone	42	8	11	23	36	79	−43	35	Relegated to the Southern Division

Source: fchd.com rsssf.com
Rules for classification: 1) points; 2) goal difference; 3) number of goals scored.

== Midland Division ==
The Midland Division consisted of 20 clubs, including 18 clubs from the previous season and two new clubs:

- Buckingham Town, joined from the United Counties League
- Halesowen Town, joined from the West Midlands (Regional) League

At the end of the season Grantham was renamed Grantham Town.

=== League table ===
Southern Football League Midland Division
- Season: 1986–87
- Champions: VS Rugby
- Promoted: VS Rugby; Leicester United
- Matches: 380
- Goals: 1,267 (3.33 per match)

Pos	Team	Pld	W	D	L	GF	GA	GD	Pts	Promotion or relegation
1	VS Rugby	38	25	5	8	81	43	+38	80	Promoted to the Premier Division
2	Leicester United	38	26	1	11	89	49	+40	79	Promoted to the Premier Division
3	Merthyr Tydfil	38	23	6	9	95	54	+41	75	Qualification for the 1987–88 European Cup Winners' Cup first round
4	Moor Green	38	22	6	10	73	55	+18	72	
5	Halesowen Town	38	19	12	7	72	50	+22	69	
6	Hednesford Town	38	21	5	12	84	56	+28	68	
7	Gloucester City	38	19	5	14	77	59	+18	62	
8	Coventry Sporting	38	17	8	13	55	54	+1	59	
9	Forest Green Rovers	38	16	9	13	65	53	+12	57	
10	Stourbridge	38	16	7	15	56	56	0	55	
11	Grantham	38	15	9	14	74	54	+20	54	
12	Banbury United	38	14	7	17	55	65	−10	49	
13	Buckingham Town	38	13	9	16	55	59	−4	48	
14	Bridgnorth Town	38	12	9	17	59	63	−4	45	
15	Wellingborough Town	38	13	6	19	55	76	−21	45	
16	Mile Oak Rovers	38	11	10	17	50	63	−13	43	
17	Sutton Coldfield Town	38	8	10	20	56	78	−22	34	
18	Bilston Town	38	8	7	23	37	76	−39	31	
19	Leamington	38	4	13	21	37	80	−43	25	Resigned to the Midland Combination
20	Rushden Town	38	1	10	27	42	124	−82	13	

Source: fchd.com rsssf.com
Rules for classification: 1) points; 2) goal difference; 3) number of goals scored.

== Southern Division ==
The Southern Division consisted of 20 clubs, including 19 clubs from the previous season and one new club:

- Gravesend & Northfleet, relegated from the Premier Division

At the end of the season Burnham & Hillingdon changed name to Burnham.

=== League table ===
Southern Football League Southern Division
- Season: 1986–87
- Champions: Dorchester Town
- Promoted: Ashford Town (Kent); Dorchester Town
- Matches: 380
- Goals: 1,179 (3.1 per match)

Pos	Team	Pld	W	D	L	GF	GA	GD	Pts	Promotion or relegation
1	Dorchester Town	38	23	8	7	83	42	+41	77	Promoted to the Premier Division
2	Ashford Town (Kent)	38	23	7	8	63	32	+31	76	Promoted to the Premier Division
3	Woodford Town	38	22	6	10	72	44	+28	72	Resigned to the Essex Senior League
4	Hastings Town	38	20	10	8	74	54	+20	70	
5	Dover Athletic	38	20	6	12	66	43	+23	66	
6	Gravesend & Northfleet	38	18	7	13	67	46	+21	61	
7	Tonbridge	38	16	10	12	73	67	+6	58	
8	Erith & Belvedere	38	15	12	11	57	50	+7	57	
9	Chatham Town	38	16	9	13	52	46	+6	57	
10	Thanet United	38	14	14	10	56	50	+6	56	
11	Waterlooville	38	16	8	14	66	65	+1	56	
12	Trowbridge Town	38	15	9	14	77	65	+12	54	Transferred to the Midland Division
13	Dunstable	38	13	9	16	60	57	+3	48	
14	Corinthian	38	11	12	15	56	65	−9	45	
15	Sheppey United	38	9	12	17	43	64	−21	39	
16	Andover	38	9	9	20	51	80	−29	36	
17	Burnham & Hillingdon	38	7	11	20	32	62	−30	32	
18	Poole Town	38	8	6	24	50	90	−40	30	
19	Ruislip	38	6	12	20	35	75	−40	30	
20	Canterbury City	38	8	5	25	46	82	−36	29	

Source: fchd.com rsssf.com
Rules for classification: 1) points; 2) goal difference; 3) number of goals scored.

== See also ==
- Southern Football League
- 1986–87 Isthmian League
- 1986–87 Northern Premier League
