= 1985–86 West Midlands (Regional) League =

The 1985–86 West Midlands (Regional) League season was the 86th in the history of the West Midlands (Regional) League, an English association football competition for semi-professional and amateur teams based in the West Midlands county, Shropshire, Herefordshire, Worcestershire and southern Staffordshire.

== Premier Division ==
West Midlands League Premier Division
- Season: 1985–86
- Champions: Halesowen Town
- Promoted: Halesowen Town
- Matches: 380
- Goals: 1,203 (3.17 per match)

The Premier Division featured 19 clubs which competed in the division last season, along with one new club, promoted from Division One:

- Harrisons

=== League table ===
| Pos | Team | Pld | W | D | L | GF | GA | GD | Pts | Promotion or relegation |
|---|---|---|---|---|---|---|---|---|---|---|
| 1 | Halesowen Town | 38 | 31 | 4 | 3 | 108 | 28 | +80 | 66 | Promoted to the Southern League |
| 2 | Gresley Rovers | 38 | 25 | 9 | 4 | 91 | 29 | +62 | 59 | |
| 3 | Atherstone United | 38 | 26 | 7 | 5 | 90 | 48 | +42 | 59 | |
| 4 | Harrisons | 38 | 22 | 9 | 7 | 82 | 40 | +42 | 53 | |
| 5 | Wednesfield Social | 38 | 21 | 7 | 10 | 88 | 48 | +40 | 49 | |
| 6 | Lye Town | 38 | 18 | 11 | 9 | 54 | 39 | +15 | 47 | |
| 7 | GKN Sankey | 38 | 15 | 12 | 11 | 59 | 64 | −5 | 42 | |
| 8 | Hinckley Athletic | 38 | 15 | 11 | 12 | 60 | 50 | +10 | 41 | |
| 9 | Tamworth | 38 | 15 | 8 | 15 | 68 | 52 | +16 | 38 | |
| 10 | Brereton Social | 38 | 13 | 11 | 14 | 58 | 54 | +4 | 37 | |
| 11 | Malvern Town | 38 | 13 | 10 | 15 | 51 | 61 | −10 | 36 | |
| 12 | Rushall Olympic | 38 | 14 | 9 | 15 | 63 | 65 | −2 | 37 | |
| 13 | Shifnal Town | 38 | 9 | 10 | 19 | 38 | 76 | −38 | 28 | Resigned from the league |
| 14 | Oldswinford | 38 | 9 | 9 | 20 | 46 | 68 | −22 | 27 | |
| 15 | Blakenall | 38 | 9 | 8 | 21 | 38 | 61 | −23 | 26 | |
| 16 | Tividale | 38 | 8 | 10 | 20 | 51 | 83 | −32 | 26 | |
| 17 | Chasetown | 38 | 7 | 10 | 21 | 40 | 74 | −34 | 24 | |
| 18 | Wolverhampton United | 38 | 8 | 8 | 22 | 31 | 66 | −35 | 24 | |
| 19 | Tipton Town | 38 | 8 | 8 | 22 | 43 | 79 | −36 | 24 | |
| 20 | Armitage | 38 | 7 | 3 | 28 | 44 | 118 | −74 | 17 | |

Source: nonleaguematters
Rules for classification: 1) points; 2) goal difference; 3) number of goals scored.
