= 1988–89 Isthmian League =

The 1988–89 season was the 74th season of the Isthmian League, which is an English football competition featuring semi-professional and amateur clubs from London, East and South East England.

The league consisted of three divisions. Division Two was divided into two sections.

Leytonstone/Ilford were 1989 champions, winning their first Isthmian League title after renaming in 1983. In the summer of 1988, Oxford City had left the league after losing its ground. Also in the summer of 1988, Walthamstow Avenue merged into Leytonstone/Ilford: the new club regained Leytonstone/Ilford's name and place in the Premier Division.

== Premier Division ==
Isthmian League Premier Division
- Season: 1988–89
- Champions: Leytonstone/Ilford
- Promoted: Farnborough Town
- Relegated: Croydon; Tooting & Mitcham United
- Matches: 462
- Goals: 1,236 (2.68 per match)
- Highest attendance: 1,763 – Slough Town – Farnborough Town, (27 December)
- Total attendance: 141,270
- Average attendance: 306

The Premier Division consisted of 22 clubs, including 19 clubs from the previous season and three new clubs:

- Dagenham, relegated from the Football Conference
- Grays Athletic, promoted as champions of Division One
- Marlow, promoted as runners-up in Division One

At the end of the previous season First Division club Walthamstow Avenue merged into Leytonstone/Ilford. The new club started next season in the Premier Division under the name of the Premier Division club.

At the end of the season Leytonstone/Ilford were refused in promotion due to ground problems. The club changed its name into Redbridge Forest before the next season started.

Farnborough Town finished second and were promoted back to the Conference after four years in the Isthmian League.

=== League table ===
Pos	Team	Pld	W	D	L	GF	GA	GD	Pts	Promotion or relegation
1	Leytonstone/Ilford	42	26	11	5	76	36	+40	89	
2	Farnborough Town	42	24	9	9	85	61	+24	81	Promoted to the Football Conference
3	Slough Town	42	24	6	12	72	42	+30	78	
4	Carshalton Athletic	42	19	15	8	59	36	+23	72	
5	Grays Athletic	42	19	13	10	62	47	+15	70	
6	Kingstonian	42	19	11	12	54	37	+17	68	
7	Bishop's Stortford	42	20	6	16	70	56	+14	66	
8	Hayes	42	18	12	12	61	47	+14	66	
9	Bognor Regis Town	42	17	11	14	38	49	−11	62	
10	Barking	42	16	13	13	49	45	+4	61	
11	Wokingham Town	42	15	11	16	60	54	+6	56	
12	Hendon	42	13	17	12	51	68	−17	56	
13	Windsor & Eton	42	14	13	15	52	50	+2	55	
14	Bromley	42	13	15	14	61	48	+13	54	
15	Leyton-Wingate	42	13	15	14	55	56	−1	54	
16	Dulwich Hamlet	42	12	12	18	58	57	+1	48	
17	St Albans City	42	12	9	21	51	59	−8	45	
18	Dagenham	42	11	12	19	53	68	−15	45	
19	Harrow Borough	42	9	13	20	53	75	−22	40	
20	Marlow	42	9	11	22	48	83	−35	38	
21	Tooting & Mitcham United	42	10	6	26	41	81	−40	36	Relegated to Division One
22	Croydon	42	4	9	29	27	81	−54	21	Relegated to Division One

Source: fchd.com rsssf.com
Rules for classification: 1) points; 2) goal difference; 3) number of goals scored.

=== Stadia and locations ===
Locations of the Premier Division clubs
Greater London Premier Division football clubs

Club	Stadium
Barking	Mayesbrook Park
Bishop's Stortford	Woodside Park
Bognor Regis Town	Nyewood Lane
Bromley	Hayes Lane
Carshalton Athletic	War Memorial Sports Ground
Croydon	Croydon Sports Arena
Dagenham	Victoria Road
Dulwich Hamlet	Champion Hill
Farnborough Town	Cherrywood Road
Grays Athletic	New Recreation Ground
Hayes	Church Road
Harrow Borough	Earlsmead Stadium
Hendon	Claremont Road
Kingstonian	Kingsmeadow
Leytonstone/Ilford	Victoria Road
Leyton-Wingate	Wadham Lodge
Marlow	Alfred Davis Memorial Ground
Slough Town	Wexham Park
St Albans City	Clarence Park
Tooting & Mitcham United	Imperial Fields
Windsor & Eton	Stag Meadow
Wokingham Town	Cantley Park

== Division One ==
Isthmian League Division One
- Season: 1988–89
- Champions: Staines Town
- Promoted: Basingstoke Town; Staines Town
- Relegated: Basildon United; Bracknell Town; Collier Row
- Matches: 420
- Goals: 1,170 (2.79 per match)
- Highest attendance: 1,432 – Woking – Lewes, (6 May)
- Total attendance: 85,740
- Average attendance: 204

Division One consisted of 21 clubs, including 15 clubs from the previous season and six new clubs:

Two clubs relegated from the Premier Division:

- Basingstoke Town
- Hitchin Town

Two clubs promoted from Division Two North:

- Collier Row
- Wivenhoe Town

Two clubs promoted from Division Two South:

- Chalfont St Peter
- Metropolitan Police

Division One started the season one club short after Oxford City left the league after losing its ground, and Walthamstow Avenue merged into Leytonstone/Ilford at the end of the previous season.

=== League table ===
Pos	Team	Pld	W	D	L	GF	GA	GD	Pts	Promotion or relegation
1	Staines Town	40	26	9	5	79	29	+50	87	Promoted to the Premier Division
2	Basingstoke Town	40	25	8	7	85	36	+49	83	Promoted to the Premier Division
3	Woking	40	24	10	6	72	30	+42	82	
4	Hitchin Town	40	21	11	8	60	32	+28	74	
5	Wivenhoe Town	40	22	6	12	62	44	+18	72	
6	Lewes	40	21	8	11	72	54	+18	71	
7	Walton & Hersham	40	21	7	12	56	36	+20	70	
8	Kingsbury Town	40	20	7	13	65	41	+24	67	
9	Uxbridge	40	19	7	14	60	54	+6	64	
10	Wembley	40	18	6	16	45	58	−13	60	
11	Boreham Wood	40	16	9	15	57	52	+5	57	
12	Leatherhead	40	14	8	18	56	58	−2	50	
13	Metropolitan Police	40	13	9	18	52	68	−16	48	
14	Chesham United	40	12	9	19	54	67	−13	45	
15	Southwick	40	9	15	16	44	58	−14	42	
16	Chalfont St Peter	40	11	9	20	56	82	−26	42	
17	Hampton	40	7	14	19	37	62	−25	35	
18	Worthing	40	8	10	22	49	80	−31	32 (Note: Worthing were deducted two points.)	
19	Collier Row	40	8	7	25	37	82	−45	31	Relegated to Division Two North
20	Bracknell Town	40	8	6	26	38	70	−32	30	Relegated to Division Two South
21	Basildon United	40	6	7	27	34	77	−43	25	Relegated to Division Two North

Source: fchd.com rsssf.com
Rules for classification: 1) points; 2) goal difference; 3) number of goals scored.

=== Stadia and locations ===
Locations of the Division One clubs
Greater London Division One football clubs

Club	Stadium
Basildon United	Gardiners Close
Basingstoke Town	The Camrose
Boreham Wood	Meadow Park
Bracknell Town	Larges Lane
Chalfont St Peter	Mill Meadow
Chesham United	The Meadow
Collier Row	Sungate
Hampton	Beveree Stadium
Hitchin Town	Top Field
Kingsbury Town	Avenue Park
Leatherhead	Fetcham Grove
Lewes	The Dripping Pan
Metropolitan Police	Imber Court
Southwick	Old Barn Way
Staines Town	Wheatsheaf Park
Uxbridge	Honeycroft
Walton & Hersham	The Sports Ground
Wembley	Vale Farm
Wivenhoe Town	Broad Lane
Woking	The Laithwaite Community Stadium
Worthing	Woodside Road

== Division Two North ==
Isthmian League Division Two North
- Season: 1988–89
- Champions: Harlow Town
- Promoted: Harlow Town; Purfleet
- Relegated: Wolverton Town
- Matches: 462
- Goals: 1,291 (2.79 per match)
- Highest attendance: 512 – Stevenage Borough – Harlow Town, (14 January)
- Total attendance: 57,239
- Average attendance: 124

Division Two North consisted of 22 clubs, including 18 clubs from the previous season and four new clubs:

- Billericay Town, relegated from Division One
- Purfleet, joined from the Essex Senior League
- Stevenage Borough, relegated from Division One
- Wolverton Town, relegated from Division One

=== League table ===
Pos	Team	Pld	W	D	L	GF	GA	GD	Pts	Promotion or relegation
1	Harlow Town	42	27	9	6	83	38	+45	90	Promoted to Division One
2	Purfleet	42	22	12	8	60	42	+18	78	Promoted to Division One
3	Tring Town	42	22	10	10	65	44	+21	76	
4	Stevenage Borough	42	20	13	9	84	55	+29	73	
5	Heybridge Swifts	42	21	9	12	64	43	+21	72	
6	Billericay Town	42	19	11	12	65	52	+13	68	
7	Clapton	42	18	11	13	65	56	+9	65	
8	Barton Rovers	42	18	11	13	58	50	+8	65	
9	Aveley	42	18	10	14	54	52	+2	64	
10	Hertford Town	42	16	13	13	62	49	+13	59 (Note: Hertford Town were deducted two points.)	
11	Ware	42	17	8	17	60	65	−5	59	
12	Hemel Hempstead	42	16	10	16	55	58	−3	58	
13	Witham Town	42	16	7	19	69	67	+2	55	
14	Vauxhall Motors	42	15	9	18	53	57	−4	54	
15	Berkhamsted Town	42	14	10	18	57	70	−13	52	
16	Hornchurch	42	11	16	15	59	61	−2	49	
17	Tilbury	42	13	10	19	53	60	−7	49	
18	Royston Town	42	12	7	23	46	72	−26	43	
19	Rainham Town	42	9	15	18	49	62	−13	42	
20	Saffron Walden Town	42	8	16	18	54	72	−18	40	
21	Letchworth Garden City	42	4	18	20	34	71	−37	30	
22	Wolverton Town	42	5	7	30	42	95	−53	13 (Note: Wolverton Town were deducted nine points.)	Relegated to the South Midlands League

Source: fchd.com rsssf.com
Rules for classification: 1) points; 2) goal difference; 3) number of goals scored.

=== Stadia and locations ===
Locations of the Division Two North clubs
Greater London Division Two North football clubs

Club	Stadium
Aveley	The Mill Field
Barton Rovers	Sharpenhoe Road
Berkhamsted Town	Broadwater
Billericay Town	New Lodge
Clapton	The Old Spotted Dog Ground
Harlow Town	Harlow Sportcentre
Hemel Hempstead	Vauxhall Road
Hertford Town	Hertingfordbury Park
Heybridge Swifts	Scraley Road
Hornchurch	Hornchurch Stadium
Letchworth Garden City	Baldock Road
Purfleet	Ship Lane
Rainham Town	Deri Park
Royston Town	Garden Walk
Saffron Walden Town	Catons Lane
Stevenage Borough	The Lamex Stadium
Tilbury	Chadfields
Tring Town	Pendley Ground
Vauxhall Motors	Brache Estate
Ware	Wodson Park
Witham Town	Spa Road
Wolverton Town	Wolverton Park

== Division Two South ==
Isthmian League Division Two South
- Season: 1988–89
- Champions: Dorking
- Promoted: Dorking; Whyteleafe
- Matches: 420
- Goals: 1,183 (2.82 per match)
- Highest attendance: 365 – Whyteleafe – Dorking, (8 April)
- Total attendance: 39,367
- Average attendance: 94

Division Two South consisted of 21 clubs, including 20 clubs from the previous season and one new club:

- Finchley, transferred from Division Two North

=== League table ===
Pos	Team	Pld	W	D	L	GF	GA	GD	Pts	Promotion or relegation
1	Dorking	40	32	4	4	109	35	+74	100	Promoted to Division One
2	Whyteleafe	40	25	9	6	86	41	+45	84	Promoted to Division One
3	Finchley	40	21	9	10	70	45	+25	72	Transferred to Division Two North
4	Molesey	40	19	13	8	58	42	+16	70	
5	Harefield United	40	19	7	14	56	45	+11	64	
6	Hungerford Town	40	17	13	10	55	45	+10	64	
7	Ruislip Manor	40	16	9	15	56	43	+13	57	
8	Feltham	40	16	9	15	58	53	+5	57	
9	Epsom & Ewell	40	16	8	16	55	55	0	56	
10	Egham Town	40	16	7	17	54	58	−4	55	
11	Eastbourne United	40	15	9	16	68	61	+7	54	
12	Chertsey Town	40	13	14	13	55	58	−3	53	
13	Flackwell Heath	40	13	11	16	51	49	+2	50	
14	Camberley Town	40	15	5	20	51	71	−20	50	
15	Yeading	40	13	9	18	47	63	−16	46 (Note: Yeading were deducted two points.)	
16	Banstead Athletic	40	12	8	20	50	65	−15	44	
17	Maidenhead United	40	10	13	17	44	61	−17	43	
18	Southall	40	11	10	19	41	73	−32	43	
19	Newbury Town	40	11	8	21	47	65	−18	41	
20	Horsham	40	7	14	19	36	68	−32	35	
21	Petersfield United	40	5	7	28	36	87	−51	22	

Source: fchd.com rsssf.com
Rules for classification: 1) points; 2) goal difference; 3) number of goals scored.

=== Stadia and locations ===
Locations of the Division Two South clubs
Greater London Division Two South football clubs

Club	Stadium
Banstead Athletic	Merland Rise
Camberley Town	Kroomer Park
Chertsey Town	Alwyns Lane
Dorking	Meadowbank Stadium
Eastbourne United	The Oval
Egham Town	The Runnymede Stadium
Epsom & Ewell	Merland Rise (groundshare with Banstead Athletic)
Feltham	The Orchard
Finchley	Summers Lane
Flackwell Heath	Wilks Park
Harefield United	Preston Park
Horsham	Queen Street
Hungerford Town	Bulpit Lane
Maidenhead United	York Road
Molesey	Walton Road Stadium
Newbury Town	Town Ground
Petersfield United	The Southdowns Builders Stadium
Ruislip Manor	Grosvenor Vale
Southall	Robert Parker Stadium
Whyteleafe	Church Road
Yeading	The Warren

== See also ==
- Isthmian League
- 1988–89 Northern Premier League
- 1988–89 Southern Football League
