= 1985–86 Essex Senior Football League =

The 1985–86 season was the 15th in the history of Essex Senior Football League, a football competition in England.

The league featured 16 clubs which competed in the league last season, along with one new club:

- Burnham Ramblers, joined from the Essex Olympian League

Witham Town were champions, winning their second Essex Senior League title, while Wivenhoe Town were promoted to the Isthmian League.

== League table ==
Essex Senior Football League
- Season: 1985–86
- Champions: Witham Town
- Promoted: Wivenhoe Town
- Matches: 272
- Goals: 910 (3.35 per match)

Pos	Team	Pld	W	D	L	GF	GA	GD	Pts	Promotion or relegation
1	Witham Town	32	24	5	3	73	23	+50	77	
2	Wivenhoe Town	32	19	5	8	82	47	+35	62	Promoted to the Isthmian League
3	Ford United	32	19	4	9	65	41	+24	61	
4	Maldon Town	32	17	9	6	48	24	+24	60	
5	East Thurrock United	32	16	9	7	64	41	+23	57	
6	Brentwood	32	18	0	14	71	47	+24	54	
7	Chelmsford City reserves	32	15	7	10	48	38	+10	52	
8	Bowers United	32	13	7	12	54	49	+5	46	
9	Canvey Island	32	10	11	11	53	45	+8	41	
10	Eton Manor	32	11	6	15	52	80	−28	39	
11	Brightlingsea United	32	10	8	14	46	52	−6	38	
12	Burnham Ramblers	32	10	7	15	45	54	−9	37	
13	Stansted	32	10	4	18	37	51	−14	34	
14	Sawbridgeworth Town	32	9	6	17	53	72	−19	33	
15	Halstead Town	32	8	6	18	47	67	−20	30	
16	East Ham United	32	7	9	16	41	74	−33	30	
17	Coggeshall Town	32	2	5	25	31	105	−74	11	Resigned from the league

Source: fchd
Rules for classification: 1) points; 2) goal difference; 3) number of goals scored.
