= 1987–88 Isthmian League =

The 1987–88 season was the 73rd season of the Isthmian League, which is an English football competition featuring semi-professional and amateur clubs from London, East and South East England.

The league consisted of three divisions. Division Two was divided into two sections.

Yeovil Town were champions, winning their first Isthmian League title. At the end of the season Oxford City left the league after losing its ground. Walthamstow Avenue merged into Leytonstone/Ilford. New club regained Leytonstone/Ilford's name and place in the Premier Division. Before the start of the next season Haringey Borough resigned from the league.

== Premier Division ==
Isthmian League Premier Division
- Season: 1987–88
- Champions: Yeovil Town
- Promoted: Yeovil Town
- Relegated: Basingstoke Town; Hitchin Town
- Matches: 462
- Goals: 1,201 (2.6 per match)

The Premier Division consisted of 22 clubs, including 19 clubs from the previous season and three new clubs:

- Basingstoke Town, transferred from Southern Football League
- Leyton-Wingate, promoted as runners-up in Division One
- Leytonstone/Ilford, promoted as champions of Division One

At the end of the season Division One club Walthamstow Avenue merged into Leytonstone/Ilford. New club started next season under the name of the Premier Division club.

=== League table ===
Pos	Team	Pld	W	D	L	GF	GA	GD	Pts	Promotion or relegation
1	Yeovil Town	42	24	9	9	66	34	+32	81	Promoted to the Football Conference
2	Bromley	42	23	7	12	68	40	+28	76	
3	Slough Town	42	21	9	12	67	41	+26	72	
4	Leytonstone/Ilford	42	20	11	11	59	43	+16	71	
5	Wokingham Town	42	21	7	14	62	52	+10	70	
6	Hayes	42	20	9	13	62	48	+14	69	
7	Windsor & Eton	42	16	17	9	59	43	+16	65	
8	Farnborough Town	42	17	11	14	63	60	+3	62	
9	Carshalton Athletic	42	16	13	13	49	41	+8	61	
10	Hendon	42	16	12	14	62	58	+4	60	
11	Tooting & Mitcham United	42	15	14	13	57	59	−2	59	
12	Harrow Borough	42	15	11	16	53	58	−5	56	
13	Bishop's Stortford	42	15	10	17	55	58	−3	55	
14	Kingstonian	42	14	12	16	47	53	−6	54	
15	St Albans City	42	15	6	21	60	69	−9	51	
16	Bognor Regis Town	42	14	9	19	41	57	−16	51	
17	Leyton-Wingate	42	14	8	20	58	64	−6	50	
18	Croydon	42	11	13	18	40	52	−12	46	
19	Barking	42	11	12	19	44	57	−13	45	
20	Dulwich Hamlet	42	10	11	21	46	64	−18	41	
21	Hitchin Town	42	10	8	24	46	79	−33	38	Relegated to Division One
22	Basingstoke Town	42	6	17	19	37	71	−34	35	Relegated to Division One

Source: fchd.com rsssf.com
Rules for classification: 1) points; 2) goal difference; 3) number of goals scored.

=== Stadia and locations ===
Locations of the Premier Division clubs
Greater London Premier Division football clubs
Somerset Premier Division football clubs

Club	Stadium
Barking	Mayesbrook Park
Basingstoke Town	The Camrose
Bishop's Stortford	Woodside Park
Bognor Regis Town	Nyewood Lane
Bromley	Hayes Lane
Carshalton Athletic	War Memorial Sports Ground
Croydon	Croydon Sports Arena
Dulwich Hamlet	Champion Hill
Farnborough Town	Cherrywood Road
Hayes	Church Road
Harrow Borough	Earlsmead Stadium
Hendon	Claremont Road
Hitchin Town	Top Field
Kingstonian	Kingsmeadow
Leytonstone/Ilford	Victoria Road
Leyton-Wingate	Wadham Lodge
Slough Town	Wexham Park
St Albans City	Clarence Park
Tooting & Mitcham United	Imperial Fields
Windsor & Eton	Stag Meadow
Wokingham Town	Cantley Park
Yeovil Town	Huish Park

== Division One ==
Isthmian League Division One
- Season: 1987–88
- Champions: Marlow
- Promoted: Grays Athletic; Marlow
- Relegated: Billericay Town; Stevenage Borough; Wolverton Town
- Matches: 462
- Goals: 1,371 (2.97 per match)

Division One consisted of 22 clubs, including 16 clubs from the previous season and six new clubs:

Two clubs relegated from the Premier Division:

- Walthamstow Avenue
- Worthing

Two clubs promoted from Division Two North:

- Chesham United
- Wolverton Town

Two clubs promoted from Division Two South:

- Marlow
- Woking

At the end of the season Oxford City left the league after losing its ground. Walthamstow Avenue merged into Leytonstone/Ilford. New club regained Leytonstone/Ilford's name and place in the Premier Division.

Only Bracknell Town were reprieved from relegation, thus, Division One started next season one club short.

=== League table ===
Pos	Team	Pld	W	D	L	GF	GA	GD	Pts	Promotion or relegation
1	Marlow	42	32	5	5	100	44	+56	101	Promoted to the Premier Division
2	Grays Athletic	42	30	10	2	74	25	+49	100	Promoted to the Premier Division
3	Woking	42	25	7	10	91	52	+39	82	
4	Boreham Wood	42	21	9	12	65	45	+20	72	
5	Staines Town	42	19	11	12	71	48	+23	68	
6	Wembley	42	18	11	13	54	46	+8	65	
7	Basildon United	42	18	9	15	65	58	+7	63	
8	Walton & Hersham	42	15	16	11	53	44	+9	61	
9	Hampton	42	17	10	15	59	54	+5	61	
10	Leatherhead	42	16	11	15	64	53	+11	59	
11	Southwick	42	13	12	17	59	63	−4	51	
12	Oxford City	42	13	12	17	70	77	−7	51	Left the league
13	Worthing	42	14	8	20	67	73	−6	50	
14	Kingsbury Town	42	11	17	14	62	69	−7	50	
15	Walthamstow Avenue	42	13	11	18	53	63	−10	50 (Note: Walthamstow Avenue merged into Leytonstone/Ilford at the end of the season.)	Merged into Leytonstone/Ilford
16	Lewes	42	12	13	17	83	77	+6	49	
17	Uxbridge	42	11	16	15	41	47	−6	49	
18	Chesham United	42	12	10	20	69	77	−8	46	
19	Bracknell Town	42	12	9	21	54	80	−26	45	Reprieved from relegation
20	Billericay Town	42	11	11	20	58	88	−30	44	Relegated to Division Two North
21	Stevenage Borough	42	11	9	22	36	64	−28	42	Relegated to Division Two North
22	Wolverton Town	42	3	3	36	23	124	−101	12	Relegated to Division Two North

Source: fchd.com rsssf.com
Rules for classification: 1) points; 2) goal difference; 3) number of goals scored.

=== Stadia and locations ===
Locations of the Division One clubs
Greater London Division One football clubs

Club	Stadium
Basildon United	Gardiners Close
Billericay Town	New Lodge
Boreham Wood	Meadow Park
Bracknell Town	Larges Lane
Chesham United	The Meadow
Grays Athletic	New Recreation Ground
Hampton	Beveree Stadium
Kingsbury Town	Avenue Park
Leatherhead	Fetcham Grove
Lewes	The Dripping Pan
Marlow	Alfred Davis Memorial Ground
Oxford City	Marsh Lane
Southwick	Old Barn Way
Staines Town	Wheatsheaf Park
Stevenage Borough	The Lamex Stadium
Uxbridge	Honeycroft
Walthamstow Avenue	Green Pond Road
Walton & Hersham	The Sports Ground
Wembley	Vale Farm
Woking	The Laithwaite Community Stadium
Wolverton Town	Wolverton Park
Worthing	Woodside Road

== Division Two North ==
Isthmian League Division Two North
- Season: 1987–88
- Champions: Wivenhoe Town
- Promoted: Collier Row; Wivenhoe Town
- Matches: 462
- Goals: 1,288 (2.79 per match)

Division Two North consisted of 22 clubs, including 19 clubs from the previous season and three new clubs:

- Finchley, relegated from Division One
- Tilbury, relegated from Division One
- Witham Town, joined from the Essex Senior League

Before the start of the next season Haringey Borough resigned from the league.

=== League table ===
Pos	Team	Pld	W	D	L	GF	GA	GD	Pts	Promotion or relegation
1	Wivenhoe Town	42	26	10	6	105	42	+63	88	Promoted to Division One
2	Collier Row	42	22	13	7	71	39	+32	79	Promoted to Division One
3	Tilbury	42	18	15	9	61	40	+21	69	
4	Berkhamsted Town	42	19	12	11	71	53	+18	69	
5	Harlow Town	42	17	16	9	67	36	+31	67	
6	Ware	42	17	15	10	63	58	+5	66	
7	Witham Town	42	17	14	11	69	47	+22	65	
8	Vauxhall Motors	42	16	17	9	56	42	+14	65	
9	Heybridge Swifts	42	17	13	12	56	50	+6	64	
10	Tring Town	42	18	6	18	69	67	+2	60	
11	Letchworth Garden City	42	18	5	19	59	64	−5	59	
12	Finchley	42	16	10	16	67	54	+13	58	Transferred to Division Two South
13	Clapton	42	14	15	13	50	62	−12	57	
14	Hornchurch	42	13	15	14	56	65	−9	54	
15	Barton Rovers	42	13	10	19	43	60	−17	49	
16	Rainham Town	42	12	12	18	63	66	−3	48	
17	Royston Town	42	13	8	21	49	70	−21	47	
18	Saffron Walden Town	42	13	7	22	34	67	−33	46	
19	Hemel Hempstead	42	11	12	19	38	71	−33	45	
20	Haringey Borough	42	11	8	23	54	78	−24	41	Resigned from the league
21	Aveley	42	8	13	21	42	65	−23	37	
22	Hertford Town	42	8	4	30	45	92	−47	28	

Source: fchd.com rsssf.com
Rules for classification: 1) points; 2) goal difference; 3) number of goals scored.

=== Stadia and locations ===
Locations of the Division Two North clubs
Greater London Division Two North football clubs

Club	Stadium
Aveley	The Mill Field
Barton Rovers	Sharpenhoe Road
Berkhamsted Town	Broadwater
Clapton	The Old Spotted Dog Ground
Collier Row	Sungate
Finchley	Summers Lane
Harlow Town	Harlow Sportcentre
Haringey Borough	Coles Park
Hemel Hempstead	Vauxhall Road
Hertford Town	Hertingfordbury Park
Heybridge Swifts	Scraley Road
Hornchurch	Hornchurch Stadium
Letchworth Garden City	Baldock Road
Rainham Town	Deri Park
Royston Town	Garden Walk
Saffron Walden Town	Catons Lane
Tilbury	Chadfields
Tring Town	Pendley Ground
Vauxhall Motors	Brache Estate
Ware	Wodson Park
Witham Town	Spa Road
Wivenhoe Town	Broad Lane

== Division Two South ==
Isthmian League Division Two South
- Season: 1987–88
- Champions: Chalfont St Peter
- Promoted: Chalfont St Peter; Metropolitan Police
- Matches: 462
- Goals: 1,346 (2.91 per match)

Division Two South consisted of 22 clubs, including 19 clubs from the previous season and three new clubs:

- Epsom & Ewell, relegated from Division One
- Maidenhead United, relegated from Division One
- Yeading, joined from the London Spartan League

=== League table ===
Pos	Team	Pld	W	D	L	GF	GA	GD	Pts	Promotion or relegation
1	Chalfont St Peter	42	26	9	7	81	35	+46	87	Promoted to Division One
2	Metropolitan Police	42	23	17	2	80	32	+48	86	Promoted to Division One
3	Dorking	42	25	11	6	86	39	+47	86	
4	Feltham	42	21	12	9	74	41	+33	75	
5	Epsom & Ewell	42	21	11	10	71	49	+22	74	
6	Chertsey Town	42	22	7	13	63	47	+16	73	
7	Whyteleafe	42	20	11	11	84	55	+29	71	
8	Hungerford Town	42	21	7	14	66	54	+12	70	
9	Ruislip Manor	42	21	5	16	74	57	+17	68	
10	Yeading	42	19	10	13	83	56	+27	67	
11	Maidenhead United	42	18	12	12	69	54	+15	66	
12	Eastbourne United	42	18	10	14	67	57	+10	64	
13	Harefield United	42	18	6	18	59	60	−1	60	
14	Egham Town	42	12	12	18	45	55	−10	48	
15	Horsham	42	12	10	20	45	66	−21	46	
16	Southall	42	13	7	22	45	72	−27	46	
17	Molesey	42	11	11	20	42	63	−21	44	
18	Newbury Town	42	8	13	21	40	81	−41	37	
19	Camberley Town	42	9	9	24	51	94	−43	36	
20	Flackwell Heath	42	6	8	28	42	96	−54	26	
21	Banstead Athletic	42	6	7	29	34	81	−47	25	
22	Petersfield United	42	6	7	29	45	102	−57	25	

Source: fchd.com rsssf.com
Rules for classification: 1) points; 2) goal difference; 3) number of goals scored.

=== Stadia and locations ===
Locations of the Division Two South clubs
Greater London Division Two South football clubs

Club	Stadium
Banstead Athletic	Merland Rise
Camberley Town	Kroomer Park
Chalfont St Peter	Mill Meadow
Chertsey Town	Alwyns Lane
Dorking	Meadowbank Stadium
Eastbourne United	The Oval
Egham Town	The Runnymede Stadium
Epsom & Ewell	Merland Rise (groundshare with Banstead Athletic)
Feltham	The Orchard
Flackwell Heath	Wilks Park
Harefield United	Preston Park
Horsham	Queen Street
Hungerford Town	Bulpit Lane
Maidenhead United	York Road
Metropolitan Police	Imber Court
Molesey	Walton Road Stadium
Newbury Town	Town Ground
Petersfield United	The Southdowns Builders Stadium
Ruislip Manor	Grosvenor Vale
Southall	Robert Parker Stadium
Whyteleafe	Church Road
Yeading	The Warren

== See also ==
- Isthmian League
- 1987–88 Northern Premier League
- 1987–88 Southern Football League
