= Collier Row F.C. =

Defunct English association football club

Collier Row F.C. is an English association football club that was formed in 1962. The club is based in Collier Row England. They are currently members of the ProKit UK Essex Olympian Football League, DIV Three North West. and play at the Forest Lodge Stadium, Forest Row Centre(Collier Row). The club were founding members of the Essex Olympian League. From the 1981–82 season until the 1985–86 season the club competed in the London Spartan League before joining the Isthmian League for the 1986–87 Div 2 North Season. They competed in the Isthmian League for ten seasons, the highest position achieved being in isthmian league1988–89 when they finished 19th (out of 21) in the First Division.
