= 1987–88 Southern Football League =

The 1987–88 Southern Football League season was the 85th in the history of the league, an English football competition.

Aylesbury United won the Premier Division and earned promotion to the Football Conference, whilst Chatham Town, Paget Rangers and Shepshed Charterhouse left the league at the end of the season.

== Premier Division ==
The Premier Division consisted of 22 clubs, including 16 clubs from the previous season and six new clubs:

- Two clubs promoted from the Midland Division:
  - Leicester United
  - VS Rugby
- Two clubs promoted from the Southern Division:
  - Ashford Town (Kent)
  - Dorchester Town
- Plus:
  - Nuneaton Borough, demoted from the Football Conference
  - Burton Albion, transferred from the Northern Premier League

=== League table ===
Southern Football League Premier Division
- Season: 1987–88
- Champions: Aylesbury United
- Promoted: Aylesbury United
- Relegated: Chelmsford City; Nuneaton Borough; Willenhall Town
- Matches: 462
- Goals: 1,280 (2.77 per match)

Pos	Team	Pld	W	D	L	GF	GA	GD	Pts	Promotion or relegation
1	Aylesbury United	42	27	8	7	79	35	+44	89	Promoted to the Football Conference
2	Dartford	42	27	8	7	79	39	+40	89	
3	Cambridge City	42	24	8	10	84	43	+41	80	
4	Bromsgrove Rovers	42	22	11	9	65	39	+26	77	
5	Worcester City	42	22	6	14	58	48	+10	72	
6	Crawley Town	42	17	14	11	73	63	+10	65	
7	Alvechurch	42	17	13	12	54	52	+2	64	
8	Leicester United	42	15	14	13	68	59	+9	59	
9	Fareham Town	42	16	11	15	51	59	−8	59	
10	Corby Town	42	16	8	18	61	64	−3	56	
11	Dorchester Town	42	14	14	14	51	57	−6	56	
12	Ashford Town (Kent)	42	12	16	14	45	54	−9	52	
13	Shepshed Charterhouse	42	13	11	18	53	62	−9	50	Transferred to the Northern Premier League Premier Division
14	Bedworth United	42	12	14	16	49	64	−15	50	
15	Gosport Borough	42	10	17	15	39	49	−10	47	
16	Burton Albion	42	11	14	17	62	74	−12	47	
17	VS Rugby	42	10	16	16	52	57	−5	46	
18	Redditch United	42	10	13	19	55	63	−8	43	
19	Chelmsford City	42	11	10	21	60	75	−15	43	Relegated to the Southern Division
20	Willenhall Town	42	9	12	21	39	76	−37	39	Relegated to the Midland Division
21	Nuneaton Borough	42	8	13	21	58	77	−19	37	Relegated to the Midland Division
22	Witney Town	42	8	11	23	45	71	−26	35	Relegated to the Southern Division

Source: fchd.com rsssf.com
Rules for classification: 1) points; 2) goal difference; 3) number of goals scored.

== Midland Division ==
The Midland Division expanded up to 22 clubs, including 17 clubs from the previous season and five new clubs:

- Two clubs relegated from the Premier Division:
  - Dudley Town
  - King's Lynn
- Plus:
  - Atherstone United, promoted from the West Midlands (Regional) League
  - Paget Rangers, promoted from the Midland Combination
  - Trowbridge Town, transferred from the Southern Division

=== League table ===
Southern Football League Midland Division
- Season: 1987–88
- Champions: Merthyr Tydfil
- Promoted: Merthyr Tydfil; Moor Green
- Relegated: Paget Rangers
- Matches: 462
- Goals: 1,455 (3.15 per match)

Pos	Team	Pld	W	D	L	GF	GA	GD	Pts	Promotion or relegation
1	Merthyr Tydfil	42	30	4	8	102	40	+62	94	Promoted to the Premier Division
2	Moor Green	42	26	8	8	91	49	+42	86	Promoted to the Premier Division
3	Grantham Town	42	27	4	11	97	53	+44	85	
4	Atherstone United	42	22	10	10	93	56	+37	76	
5	Sutton Coldfield Town	42	22	6	14	71	47	+24	72	
6	Halesowen Town	42	18	15	9	75	59	+16	69	
7	Gloucester City	42	18	14	10	86	62	+24	68	
8	Dudley Town	42	20	5	17	64	55	+9	65	
9	Forest Green Rovers	42	14	16	12	67	54	+13	58	
10	Banbury United	42	17	7	18	48	46	+2	58	
11	Bridgnorth Town	42	16	7	19	59	75	−16	55	
12	Buckingham Town	42	15	9	18	74	75	−1	54	Transferred to the Southern Division
13	King's Lynn	42	16	6	20	53	63	−10	54	
14	Wellingborough Town	42	14	10	18	67	70	−3	52	
15	Rushden Town	42	14	9	19	69	85	−16	51	
16	Trowbridge Town	42	14	3	25	53	82	−29	45	Transferred to the Southern Division
17	Bilston Town	42	12	8	22	52	87	−35	44	
18	Hednesford Town	42	11	10	21	50	81	−31	43	
19	Mile Oak Rovers	42	9	14	19	43	65	−22	41	
20	Coventry Sporting	42	11	8	23	46	83	−37	41	
21	Stourbridge	42	10	10	22	46	79	−33	40	
22	Paget Rangers	42	10	9	23	49	89	−40	39	Relegated to the West Midlands League

Source: fchd.com rsssf.com
Rules for classification: 1) points; 2) goal difference; 3) number of goals scored.

== Southern Division ==
The Southern Division expanded up to 21 clubs, including 16 clubs from the previous season and five new clubs:

- Two clubs relegated from the Premier Division:
  - Folkestone
  - Salisbury
- Plus:
  - Baldock Town, promoted from the United Counties League
  - Bury Town, promoted from the Eastern Counties League
  - Hounslow, promoted from the Hellenic League

=== League table ===
Southern Football League Southern Division
- Season: 1987–88
- Champions: Dover Athletic
- Promoted: Dover Athletic; Waterlooville
- Relegated: Chatham Town
- Matches: 420
- Goals: 1,221 (2.91 per match)

Pos	Team	Pld	W	D	L	GF	GA	GD	Pts	Promotion or relegation
1	Dover Athletic	40	28	10	2	81	28	+53	94	Promoted to the Premier Division
2	Waterlooville	40	27	10	3	88	33	+55	91	Promoted to the Premier Division
3	Salisbury	40	24	11	5	71	33	+38	83	
4	Gravesend & Northfleet	40	20	12	8	60	32	+28	72	
5	Thanet United	40	17	13	10	60	38	+22	64	
6	Andover	40	17	13	10	64	58	+6	64	
7	Dunstable	40	17	12	11	78	56	+22	63	
8	Burnham	40	17	10	13	61	45	+16	61	
9	Bury Town	40	17	7	16	80	67	+13	58	
10	Erith & Belvedere	40	16	9	15	52	56	−4	57	
11	Sheppey United	40	14	10	16	58	52	+6	52	
12	Hastings Town	40	14	10	16	62	70	−8	52	
13	Tonbridge	40	14	8	18	51	56	−5	50	
14	Poole Town	40	13	10	17	69	70	−1	49	
15	Baldock Town	40	12	12	16	44	53	−9	48	
16	Hounslow	40	11	8	21	41	76	−35	41	
17	Folkestone	40	9	11	20	47	76	−29	38	
18	Corinthian	40	9	10	21	49	67	−18	37	
19	Ruislip	40	5	13	22	33	80	−47	28	
20	Canterbury City	40	7	6	27	33	87	−54	27	
21	Chatham Town	40	7	5	28	39	88	−49	26	Relegated to the Kent Football League

Source: fchd.com rsssf.com
Rules for classification: 1) points; 2) goal difference; 3) number of goals scored.

== See also ==
- Southern Football League
- 1987–88 Isthmian League
- 1987–88 Northern Premier League
