= 1986–87 Northern Premier League =

Northern Premier League
- Season: 1986–87
- Champions: Macclesfield Town
- Promoted: Macclesfield Town
- Relegated: none
- Matches: 462
- Goals: 1,349 (2.92 per match)

The 1986–87 Northern Premier League season was the 19th in the history of the Northern Premier League, a football competition in England. It was the last Northern Premier League season, consisting of a single division, as before the next season 19 clubs joined the league and formed a new Division One.

== Overview ==
The League featured twenty-two clubs.

=== Team changes ===
The following club left the League at the end of the previous season:

- Gateshead promoted to Football Conference

The following club joined the League at the start of the season:

- Barrow relegated from Alliance Premier League

=== League table ===
Pos	Team	Pld	W	D	L	GF	GA	GD	Pts	Qualification or relegation
1	Macclesfield Town (C, P)	42	26	10	6	80	47	+33	88	Promoted to Football Conference
2	Bangor City	42	25	12	5	74	35	+39	87	
3	Caernarfon Town	42	20	16	6	67	40	+27	76	
4	Marine	42	21	10	11	70	43	+27	73	
5	South Liverpool	42	21	10	11	58	40	+18	73	
6	Morecambe	42	20	12	10	66	49	+17	72	
7	Matlock Town	42	20	10	12	81	67	+14	70	
8	Southport	42	19	11	12	67	49	+18	68	
9	Chorley	42	16	12	14	58	59	−1	60	
10	Mossley	42	15	12	15	57	52	+5	57	
11	Hyde United	42	15	10	17	81	70	+11	55	
12	Burton Albion	42	16	6	20	56	68	−12	54	Transferred to Southern League Premier Division
13	Buxton	42	13	14	15	71	68	+3	53	
14	Witton Albion	42	15	8	19	68	79	−11	53	
15	Barrow	42	15	7	20	42	57	−15	52	
16	Goole Town	42	13	12	17	58	62	−4	51	
17	Oswestry Town	42	14	8	20	55	83	−28	50	
18	Rhyl	42	10	15	17	56	74	−18	45	
19	Worksop Town	42	9	13	20	56	74	−18	40	
20	Gainsborough Trinity	42	9	10	23	53	77	−24	37	
21	Workington	42	5	14	23	38	70	−32	28 (Note: Workington and Horwich RMI had 1 point deducted.)	
22	Horwich RMI	42	3	12	27	36	85	−49	20	

(C) Champions; (P) Promoted

== Results ==
Home \ Away	BAN	BRW	BRT	BUX	CNR	CHO	GAI	GOO	HOR	HYD	MAC	MAR	MAT	MOR	MOS	OSW	RHL	SLI	SOU	WTN	WRK	WKS
Bangor City		0–0	0–1	3–1	1–0	2–0	1–0	3–1	2–0	0–0	4–0	2–1	3–1	1–1	2–0	5–0	1–0	1–0	0–1	3–1	4–0	2–0
Barrow	0–0		0–1	1–3	3–0	0–4	0–0	0–3	3–0	0–2	1–2	1–0	1–0	0–0	0–1	2–0	3–0	0–2	2–1	4–2	1–0	2–0
Burton Albion	3–0	1–3		1–0	1–2	1–0	3–2	2–0	0–1	0–2	0–1	0–2	0–5	0–2	4–2	0–1	2–3	0–1	4–3	5–2	3–1	1–1
Buxton	4–4	0–0	5–3		0–0	2–2	5–1	1–1	2–0	1–1	1–1	1–2	2–3	0–1	0–0	4–0	2–2	0–2	1–3	0–0	3–1	1–3
Caernarfon Town	0–1	1–0	2–0	1–0		4–2	3–1	0–0	3–0	4–2	1–1	3–2	2–0	2–1	1–1	2–0	3–0	0–1	1–1	2–0	2–0	1–1
Chorley	3–3	0–2	2–0	1–2	2–1		1–0	2–0	3–0	0–0	0–2	2–1	1–1	2–2	2–1	1–0	1–1	1–2	3–0	2–1	2–1	2–0
Gainsborough Trinity	0–5	2–0	1–4	1–2	2–2	2–1		1–2	2–0	2–2	0–2	1–2	1–2	1–2	0–2	2–1	0–2	3–1	1–2	1–2	1–1	1–1
Goole Town	1–2	2–0	1–2	2–2	1–3	0–1	1–1		0–0	1–0	1–2	0–1	4–1	1–3	1–0	4–1	4–1	0–1	0–3	0–0	4–1	0–3
Horwich RMI	0–0	0–1	0–0	2–1	1–1	2–2	0–1	2–3		3–4	0–1	1–3	2–4	1–2	1–3	0–2	1–1	0–1	2–3	1–2	1–1	3–2
Hyde United	3–0	6–1	2–1	2–5	1–3	6–0	1–1	3–5	5–0		1–3	1–1	2–4	2–2	1–0	7–0	1–1	0–2	0–2	1–2	0–1	5–2
Macclesfield Town	4–3	3–0	2–0	1–1	2–2	4–1	2–2	3–0	2–2	0–1		2–0	0–2	4–1	4–1	1–0	3–2	4–3	2–1	3–2	4–3	2–0
Marine	1–2	4–1	4–0	4–0	1–1	1–1	0–0	1–1	5–1	1–2	1–0		2–0	1–3	1–0	5–0	3–2	0–2	0–0	3–1	0–0	2–0
Matlock Town	1–1	2–0	1–1	3–3	2–1	2–0	2–1	1–1	2–1	2–2	3–2	0–1		2–1	2–2	3–2	4–0	2–1	0–1	5–1	2–1	2–3
Morecambe	1–1	1–2	0–1	1–0	1–3	1–0	1–4	2–2	1–0	3–0	1–0	0–0	4–1		2–1	1–3	1–1	1–1	1–0	4–2	2–0	3–0
Mossley	1–1	0–0	2–0	0–4	1–1	3–1	4–1	2–0	0–0	3–1	0–1	2–3	3–1	2–1		1–1	1–1	1–1	2–0	4–1	0–0	3–2
Oswestry Town	2–3	2–1	1–1	2–4	1–1	0–0	5–1	2–2	3–2	1–0	3–3	1–2	3–3	0–3	2–1		0–1	0–0	0–3	2–4	4–3	1–0
Rhyl	2–2	3–2	0–0	2–3	1–1	0–1	4–3	2–4	6–2	2–2	1–1	0–2	4–1	1–3	3–2	0–2		2–2	0–0	2–1	1–0	0–0
South Liverpool	0–1	1–0	2–3	2–0	0–1	3–2	1–2	0–0	2–0	2–0	0–2	1–4	2–2	1–1	0–0	4–1	1–0		4–2	3–1	1–0	2–0
Southport	0–1	2–0	2–0	1–0	1–2	2–2	3–2	0–0	1–1	1–2	1–1	3–1	0–1	2–2	2–1	2–1	4–0	2–0		4–2	1–1	2–0
Witton Albion	0–2	2–3	1–2	5–1	1–1	2–3	2–1	2–1	1–1	3–1	1–1	2–2	2–2	3–1	2–0	0–1	2–1	0–2	1–0		3–1	4–2
Workington	0–1	2–0	3–2	0–1	1–1	1–1	0–0	1–2	0–0	2–5	0–1	0–0	0–3	1–1	0–2	0–2	3–1	1–1	3–3	1–1		2–1
Worksop Town	1–1	2–2	3–3	3–3	2–2	1–1	0–4	4–2	4–2	3–2	0–1	3–0	3–1	0–1	1–2	1–2	0–0	0–0	2–2	0–1	2–1	

Updated to match(es) played on 2 May 1987. Source: Northern Premier Division results grid
Legend: Blue = home team win; Yellow = draw; Red = away team win.

== Cup Results ==
Challenge Cup:

- Macclesfield Town bt. Burton Albion

President's Cup:

- Macclesfield Town 2–1 Marine

Northern Premier League Shield: Between Champions of NPL Premier Division and Winners of the NPL Cup.

- Bangor City^{1} bt. Macclesfield Town

^{1 As Macclesfield Town won both the Northern Premier League and the Presidents cup, Bangor City qualified as 2nd placed team of the NPL.}

== End of the season ==
At the end of the nineteenth season of the Northern Premier League, Macclesfield Town applied to join the Football Conference and were successful.

=== Promotion and relegation ===
The following two clubs left the League at the end of the season:

- Macclesfield Town promoted to Football Conference
- Burton Albion transferred to Southern League Premier Division

The following two clubs joined the League the following season:

- Frickley Athletic relegated from Football Conference
- Gateshead relegated from Football Conference

From the next season, the Northern Premier League was expanded to include a Division One, with 19 clubs.
