= Woodford Town F.C. (1937) =

Woodford Town
- Full name: Woodford Town Football Club
- Nickname: The Woods
- Founded: 1937
- Dissolved: 2003
- Ground: Snakes Lane
- 2002–03: Essex Senior League, 17th of 17

Woodford Town F.C. was an English football club based in Woodford, Greater London.

== History ==
The club was established in 1937, and were founder members of the Delphian League in 1951. In 1961 they switched to the Metropolitan League, before joining Division One of the Greater London League in 1967. They left the Greater London League at the end of the 1968–69 season, and rejoined the Metropolitan League in 1970.

At the end of the 1970–71 season they joined Division One South of the Southern League, but left after a single season in which they finished bottom of the table. Their Snakes Lane ground was then used by Orient for their youth team's South-East Counties League games but after a year's inactivity, Woodford Town re-formed and spent two seasons in Sunday football. In 1975, they returned to Saturday football and joined the Reserve Division of the Essex Senior League, becoming the first club to field their first team in that division. They finished top of the league and also won the Reserve Challenge Cup, beating Brightlingsea United Reserves in the final. They were promoted to the Senior Division in 1976, before switching to the Athenian League in 1979. They rejoined the Southern Division of Southern League in 1982, and played in the Anglo-Italian Cup in 1986 losing 4–0 to Piacenza in the semi-final and then 3–2 to Merthyr Tydfil in the 3rd Place play-off. Despite finishing third in 1986–87 and reaching the first round of the FA Cup for the first time, they dropped back into the Essex Senior League at the end of the season.

In 1993 the club lost its Snakes Lane ground, and transferred to Division One of the Spartan League, which merged into the Spartan South Midlands League in 1997, with Woodford placed in the Premier Division South. However, they left the league in 1998 and dropped into the London Intermediate League, before returning to the Essex Senior League in 1999. They remained in the league until being voted out in 2003 after finishing bottom of the league for three seasons in a row.

A re-formed club – formerly Bush Hill Rangers – began playing in 2015 at the Goldsdown Stadium in Brimsdown. This reformed club only lasted one season, with a third club, Woodford Town 2017 arising in the Essex Senior League after Haringey & Waltham changed their name.

== Ground ==
The club played at Snakes Lane until being evicted in 1993. They then played at various non-League grounds in East London. Their final season was spent groundsharing at Clapton's Old Spotted Dog Ground.

== Notable players ==
Johnny Haynes played for the club as a boy, whilst Jimmy Greaves played for the club before retiring altogether (for some years his father was club president).

== Records ==
- Best FA Cup performance: First round, 1986–87
- Best FA Vase performance: Fourth round: 1986–87
