= 1987–88 Football Conference =

Football Conference
- Season: 1987–88
- Champions: Lincoln City (1st Football Conference title)
- Promoted to the Football League: Lincoln City
- Conference League Cup winners: Horwich RMI (Northern Premier League)
- FA Trophy winners: Enfield
- Relegated to Level 6: Bath City, Dagenham, Wealdstone
- Matches: 462
- Goals: 1,386 (3 per match)
- Top goalscorer: Steve Norris (Telford United), 24; Phil Derbyshire, (Stafford Rangers), 24; Paul Davies, (Kidderminster Harriers), 24
- Biggest home win: Altrincham – Dagenham 6–0 (2 May 1988); Northwich Victoria – Boston United 6–0 (5 May 1988)
- Biggest away win: Wycombe Wanderers – Barnet 0–7 (15 September 1987)
- Highest scoring: Barnet – Sutton United 6–2 (28 December 1987); Lincoln City – Kidderminster Harriers 5–3 (28 December 1987); Wycombe Wanderers – Cheltenham Town 5–3 (16 January 1988)
- Longest winning run: Kettering Town, Lincoln City, 6 matches
- Longest unbeaten run: Kidderminster Harriers, Lincoln City, 16 matches
- Longest losing run: Dagenham, 12 matches
- Highest attendance: Lincoln City v Wycombe Wanderers, 9,432 (2 May 1988)
- Lowest attendance: ?
- Average attendance: 1,249 (+ 36% from the previous season)

The Football Conference season of 1987–88 (known as the GM Vauxhall Conference for sponsorship reasons) was the ninth season of the Football Conference.

== Overview ==
Lincoln City, who had been relegated to the Conference a year earlier in the first season of automatic promotion and relegation between the Conference and the Fourth Division of the Football League, won the Conference title to reclaim their place in the Football League, where they replaced the bottom placed Fourth Division club Newport County.

The season featured an experimental rule change, whereby no attacker could be offside directly from a free-kick. The change was not deemed a success, as the attacking team invariably packed the six yard box for any free-kick (and had several players stand in front of the opposition goalkeeper). The experiment was swiftly dropped.

== New teams in the league this season ==
- Lincoln City (relegated from the Football League 1986–87)
- Fisher Athletic (promoted 1986–87)
- Macclesfield Town (promoted 1986–87)
- Wycombe Wanderers (promoted 1986–87)

== Final league table ==
Pos	Team	Pld	W	D	L	GF	GA	GD	Pts	Promotion or relegation
1	Lincoln City (C, P)	42	24	10	8	86	48	+38	82	Promotion to the Football League Fourth Division
2	Barnet	42	23	11	8	93	45	+48	80	
3	Kettering Town	42	22	9	11	68	48	+20	75	
4	Runcorn	42	21	11	10	68	47	+21	74	
5	Telford United	42	20	10	12	65	50	+15	70	
6	Stafford Rangers	42	20	9	13	79	58	+21	69	
7	Kidderminster Harriers	42	18	15	9	75	66	+9	69	
8	Sutton United	42	16	18	8	77	54	+23	66	
9	Maidstone United	42	18	9	15	79	64	+15	63	
10	Weymouth	42	18	9	15	53	43	+10	63	
11	Macclesfield Town	42	18	9	15	64	62	+2	63	
12	Enfield	42	15	10	17	68	78	−10	55	
13	Cheltenham Town	42	11	20	11	64	67	−3	53	
14	Altrincham	42	14	10	18	59	59	0	52	
15	Fisher Athletic	42	13	13	16	58	61	−3	52	
16	Boston United	42	14	7	21	60	75	−15	49	
17	Northwich Victoria	42	10	17	15	46	57	−11	47	
18	Wycombe Wanderers	42	11	13	18	50	76	−26	46	
19	Welling United	42	11	9	22	50	72	−22	42	
20	Bath City (R)	42	9	10	23	48	76	−28	37	Relegation to the Southern League Premier Division
21	Wealdstone (R)	42	5	17	20	39	76	−37	32	Relegation to the Southern League Premier Division
22	Dagenham (R)	42	5	6	31	37	104	−67	21	Relegation to the Isthmian League Premier Division

(C) Champions; (P) Promoted; (R) Relegated

== Results ==
Home \ Away	ALT	BAR	BAT	BOS	CHL	DAG	ENF	FIS	KET	KID	LIN	MAC	MDS	NOR	RUN	STA	SUT	TEL	WEA	WEL	WEY	WYC
Altrincham		1–1	2–0	4–1	1–1	6–0	5–1	2–3	2–2	2–3	0–0	1–3	0–0	2–0	2–0	2–0	0–1	0–3	1–0	1–0	3–0	4–2
Barnet	3–1		4–0	1–0	1–1	3–2	3–0	2–0	4–0	1–1	4–2	2–1	2–0	4–1	1–2	2–2	6–2	0–2	5–1	5–2	3–2	1–1
Bath City	2–0	0–1		2–1	1–1	4–2	0–1	1–3	2–0	3–3	2–1	3–4	1–3	0–0	0–1	0–3	0–4	1–2	0–0	0–0	3–1	2–1
Boston United	2–2	2–1	2–0		4–1	1–0	2–3	2–1	0–2	1–0	1–2	0–2	3–3	0–1	2–2	4–1	0–0	1–1	0–1	1–2	1–0	4–0
Cheltenham Town	1–0	0–2	3–3	1–5		5–1	1–1	2–0	1–2	2–2	3–3	1–0	2–2	1–1	0–0	2–3	1–1	3–0	1–1	2–2	2–1	2–2
Dagenham	3–2	0–0	1–1	4–2	1–3		1–2	1–5	0–5	1–2	0–3	0–0	0–3	1–0	1–4	2–4	0–1	0–1	1–2	1–2	0–3	2–1
Enfield	1–1	2–0	1–3	3–2	0–1	2–2		0–0	2–0	5–2	0–0	1–2	2–4	0–1	1–3	0–0	2–3	1–4	5–2	1–0	3–2	3–2
Fisher Athletic	3–2	2–2	2–0	0–0	1–0	5–1	2–3		1–1	3–1	1–1	1–2	0–3	0–0	0–2	1–2	1–1	0–1	3–1	1–0	1–0	0–0
Kettering Town	1–2	1–1	1–1	3–0	1–1	3–0	2–1	2–1		1–1	2–0	3–2	0–2	3–1	0–3	1–0	2–2	1–0	3–2	1–0	3–0	3–0
Kidderminster Harriers	4–1	1–1	3–2	1–0	3–2	1–1	4–0	1–1	2–1		3–3	3–2	2–1	1–1	1–1	0–0	2–2	2–4	2–1	5–2	1–0	0–2
Lincoln City	5–0	2–1	3–0	5–1	5–1	3–0	4–0	3–0	0–1	5–3		3–0	1–1	3–2	1–0	2–1	1–1	0–0	3–0	2–1	0–0	2–0
Macclesfield Town	1–0	2–2	0–2	2–1	1–0	3–1	0–3	2–4	0–0	1–2	2–0		1–0	5–0	4–0	2–3	1–1	1–1	3–2	3–2	1–2	1–1
Maidstone United	2–2	2–1	3–0	1–2	2–2	2–0	3–2	2–2	2–3	1–2	1–2	2–0		1–1	3–0	4–2	2–4	2–4	1–1	0–1	2–1	0–1
Northwich Victoria	1–2	2–1	2–1	6–0	0–0	1–0	1–1	1–2	0–1	1–1	2–3	2–1	2–3		2–0	1–1	1–4	1–2	0–0	0–0	2–1	2–1
Runcorn	1–1	0–1	2–1	3–0	2–2	2–1	2–2	5–1	1–0	2–0	4–1	1–2	3–2	2–1		1–1	1–0	2–1	1–0	4–0	2–1	1–2
Stafford Rangers	3–0	1–1	1–0	3–4	2–2	4–0	3–1	3–2	2–1	0–2	1–4	0–1	2–3	3–0	2–1		2–0	1–1	5–2	2–0	0–0	3–0
Sutton United	2–1	0–1	3–1	1–2	3–0	1–1	3–3	2–0	2–2	2–0	4–1	2–3	5–1	1–1	2–2	2–0		2–1	1–1	1–1	0–1	2–2
Telford United	1–0	2–4	3–1	2–1	0–1	1–0	4–0	2–1	2–3	4–3	0–1	0–0	1–0	1–1	2–1	1–2	3–3		1–1	2–0	1–0	0–0
Wealdstone	0–0	0–6	1–1	1–1	1–4	2–3	1–0	2–1	0–2	1–1	0–0	1–1	1–3	2–2	0–1	4–2	0–0	2–2		1–1	0–2	0–0
Welling United	0–1	0–2	2–1	3–1	0–1	6–1	1–1	1–1	3–1	1–2	1–4	3–1	0–1	1–1	1–1	0–5	1–4	4–1	4–0		0–2	1–0
Weymouth	1–0	2–0	3–1	3–1	1–1	1–0	1–3	1–1	2–1	1–1	3–0	1–1	2–1	0–0	0–0	2–0	2–1	1–0	2–1	4–0		0–0
Wycombe Wanderers	1–0	0–7	2–2	1–2	5–3	2–1	1–5	1–1	0–3	0–1	1–2	5–0	1–5	1–1	2–2	0–4	1–1	2–1	1–0	3–1	2–1	

Updated to match(es) played on unknown. Source: Rothmans Football Yearbook 1988–89. Queen Anne Press, Macdonald Futura Publishers, London & Sydney, 1988.
Legend: Blue = home team win; Yellow = draw; Red = away team win.
Locations of the Football Conference teams 1987–1988
Locations of the Football Conference teams 1987–1988

== Top scorers in order of league goals ==
Rank	Player	Club	League	FA Cup	FA Trophy	League Cup	Total
1	(England) Steve Norris	Telford United	24	0	6	5	35
=	(England) Phil Derbyshire	Stafford Rangers	24	3	3	2	32
=	(England) Paul Davies	Kidderminster Harriers	24	2	1	0	27
4	(England) Steve Butler	Maidstone United	22	3	4	0	29
=	(England) Mark Carter	Runcorn	22	1	2	0	25
=	(England) Nicky Evans	Barnet	22	7	0	1	30
7	(England) Nicky Francis	Enfield	21	1	4	3	29
8	(Scotland) Steve Burr	Macclesfield Town	19	9	4	0	32
=	(Jamaica) Lenny Dennis	Sutton United	19	4	0	2	25
=	(England) Dave Sansom	Barnet	19	3	2	3	27
11	(England) Kim Casey	Kidderminster Harriers	17	2	2	0	21
12	(England) Phil Brown	Lincoln City	16	1	2	1	20
=	(England) Mark Smith	Kettering Town	16	0	2	1	19
=	(England) Paul Wilson	Boston United	16	2	3	0	21
=	(England) Brett Angell	Cheltenham Town	16	5	1	0	22
16	(England) Steve Biggins	Telford United	15	1	3	1	20
=	(England) John McGinley	Lincoln City	15	3	0	2	20
=	(England) Paul McKinnon	Sutton United	15	2	0	2	19

== Promotion and relegation ==
=== Promoted ===
- Lincoln City (to the Football League Fourth Division)
- Aylesbury United (from the Southern Premier League)
- Chorley (from the Northern Premier League)
- Yeovil Town (from the Isthmian League)

=== Relegated ===
- Newport County (from the Football League Fourth Division)
- Bath City (to the Southern Premier League)
- Dagenham (to the Isthmian League)
- Wealdstone (to the Southern Premier League)
