= List of Wingate & Finchley F.C. seasons =

Wingate & Finchley Football Club, an association football club based in Finchley in the London Borough of Barnet, England, was founded in 1991 as a merger between Finchley and Leyton-Wingate Football Clubs. Wingate & Finchley's furthest FA Cup run saw them reach the third qualifying round four times, in 1999–2000, 2014–15, 2015–16 and 2021–22. The furthest they have reached in the FA Trophy is the second round proper in 2018–19. The club's furthest FA Vase run saw them reach the third round in the 1994–95 season.

== Key ==
Key to divisions

- Isthmian Prem = Isthmian Premier Division
- Isthmian Div 1N = Isthmian Division One North
- Isthmian Div 2 = Isthmian Second Division
- Isthmian Div 3 = Isthmian Third Division
- South Mid Prem = South Midlands League Premier Division
- Southern Div 1E = Southern Football League Division One East

Key to positions and symbols

- 2nd = Runners-up
- ↑ = Promoted
- ↓ = Relegated
- → = Transferred

Key to rounds

- PRE = Preliminary round
- QR = Qualifying round
- QR1 = First qualifying round, etc.
- R1 = First round, etc.

== Seasons ==
Season	League record									FA Cup	FA Trophy	FA Vase
Season	Division	P	W	D	L	F	A	Pts	Pos	FA Cup	FA Trophy	FA Vase
1991–92	South Mid Prem	40	22	10	8	87	51	76	5th	PRE	—	R1
1992–93	South Mid Prem	42	23	11	8	84	54	80	4th	PRE	—	PRE
1993–94	South Mid Prem	30	13	5	12	45	44	44	7th	QR1	—	PRE
1994–95	South Mid Prem ↑	45	25	13	7	97	49	88	2nd	PRE	—	R3
1995–96	Isthmian Div 3	40	16	7	17	74	70	55	11th	QR1	—	R1
1996–97	Isthmian Div 3	32	11	7	14	52	63	40	8th	PRE	—	QR1
1997–98	Isthmian Div 3	38	7	8	23	46	80	29	18th	QR2	—	QR2
1998–99	Isthmian Div 3 ↑	38	25	5	8	79	38	80	2nd	QR2	—	QR2
1999–2000	Isthmian Div 2 ↓	42	11	7	24	54	97	40	20th	QR3	—	R1
2000–01	Isthmian Div 3	42	15	7	20	75	75	52	15th	QR2	—	QR2
2001–02	Isthmian Div 3 ↑	42	20	9	13	80	60	69	7th	QR2	—	R1
2002–03	Isthmian Div 1N	46	15	11	20	70	74	56	18th	QR2	QR	—
2003–04	Isthmian Div 1N →	46	19	13	14	68	63	70	11th	QR2	R1	—
2004–05	Southern Div 1E	42	15	8	19	60	75	53	12th	QR1	PRE	—
2005–06	Southern Div 1E →	42	13	14	15	57	64	53	12th	PRE	QR1	—
2006–07	Isthmian Div 1N	42	16	11	15	58	49	59	9th	QR1	QR1	—
2007–08	Isthmian Div 1N	42	8	11	23	45	72	35	18th	PRE	PRE	—
2008–09	Isthmian Div 1N	42	19	10	13	67	51	67	7th	QR2	R1	—
2009–10	Isthmian Div 1N	42	24	9	9	88	55	81	3rd (Note: Lost in the play-off semi-final to Enfield Town 3–2.)	QR2	PRE	—
2010–11	Isthmian Div 1N ↑	40	21	9	10	72	54	72	3rd (Note: Promoted into the Isthmian Premier via the play-offs, beating Harlow Town 4–2 in the semi-final and Brentwood Town 3–2 in the 2011 Isthmian Division One North play-off Final.)	PRE	QR1	—
2011–12	Isthmian Prem	42	16	11	15	63	79	59	13th	QR1	QR1	—
2012–13	Isthmian Prem	42	12	6	24	56	82	42	18th	QR2	QR2	—
2013–14	Isthmian Prem	46	14	7	25	57	84	49	21st	QR1	QR2	—
2014–15	Isthmian Prem	46	20	7	19	72	70	67	12th	QR3	QR1	—
2015–16	Isthmian Prem	46	17	9	20	66	70	60	13th	QR3	QR1	—
2016–17	Isthmian Prem	46	23	6	17	63	61	75	5th (Note: Lost in the play-off semi-final to Bognor Regis Town 2–1.)	QR2	R1	—
2017–18	Isthmian Prem	46	20	9	17	63	71	69	9th	QR2	R1	—
2018–19	Isthmian Prem	42	12	7	23	57	86	43	19th	QR1	R2	—
2019–20	Isthmian Prem	33	5	10	18	34	58	25	20th (Note: As a result of the COVID-19 pandemic, this season's Isthmian League was formally abandoned, with all results from the season being expunged, and no promotion or relegation taking place to, from, or within the competition.)	QR2	QR1	—
2020–21	Isthmian Prem	8	3	1	4	18	17	10	16th	QR1	R1	—
2021–22	Isthmian Prem	42	13	10	19	60	74	49	15th	QR3	R1	—
2022–23	Isthmian Prem	42	12	12	18	53	64	48	16th	QR2	R1	—
2023–24	Isthmian Prem	42	23	7	12	78	62	76	4th (Note: Lost in the play-off semi-final to Enfield Town 1–0.)	QR2	QR3	—
2024–25	Isthmian Prem	42	17	9	16	76	67	60	11th	QR2	QR3	—
