= 1999–2000 Isthmian League =

The 1999–2000 season was the 85th season of the Isthmian League, which is an English football competition featuring semi-professional and amateur clubs from London, East and South East England. The league consisted of four divisions.

== Premier Division ==
Isthmian League Premier Division
- Season: 1999–2000
- Champions: Dagenham & Redbridge
- Promoted: Dagenham & Redbridge
- Relegated: Aylesbury United; Boreham Wood; Walton & Hersham
- Matches: 462
- Goals: 1,357 (2.94 per match)
- Highest attendance: 5,518 – Aldershot Town – Farnborough Town, (27 December)
- Total attendance: 248,459
- Average attendance: 538 (-5.8% to previous season)

The Premier Division consisted of 22 clubs, including 19 clubs from the previous season and three new clubs:

- Canvey Island, promoted as champions of Division One
- Hitchin Town, promoted as runners-up in Division One
- Farnborough Town, relegated from the Football Conference

Dagenham & Redbridge won the division and were promoted to the Football Conference. Aylesbury United, Boreham Wood and Walton & Hersham finished bottom of the table and relegated to Division One.

Before the start of the season Hampton changed name into Hampton & Richmond Borough.

=== League table ===
Pos	Team	Pld	W	D	L	GF	GA	GD	Pts	Promotion or relegation
1	Dagenham & Redbridge	42	32	5	5	97	35	+62	101	Promoted to the Football Conference
2	Aldershot Town	42	24	5	13	71	51	+20	77	
3	Chesham United	42	20	10	12	64	50	+14	70	
4	Purfleet	42	18	15	9	70	48	+22	69	
5	Canvey Island	42	21	6	15	70	53	+17	69	
6	St Albans City	42	19	10	13	75	55	+20	67	
7	Billericay Town	42	18	12	12	62	62	0	66	
8	Hendon	42	18	8	16	61	64	−3	62	
9	Slough Town	42	17	9	16	61	59	+2	60	
10	Dulwich Hamlet	42	17	5	20	62	68	−6	56	
11	Gravesend & Northfleet	42	15	10	17	66	67	−1	55	
12	Farnborough Town	42	14	11	17	52	55	−3	53	
13	Hampton & Richmond	42	13	13	16	49	57	−8	52	
14	Enfield	42	13	11	18	64	68	−4	50	
15	Heybridge Swifts	42	13	11	18	57	65	−8	50	
16	Hitchin Town	42	13	11	18	59	72	−13	50	
17	Carshalton Athletic	42	12	12	18	55	65	−10	48	
18	Basingstoke Town	42	13	9	20	56	71	−15	48	
19	Harrow Borough	42	14	6	22	54	70	−16	48	
20	Aylesbury United	42	13	9	20	64	81	−17	48	Relegated to Division One
21	Boreham Wood	42	11	10	21	44	71	−27	43	Relegated to Division One
22	Walton & Hersham	42	11	8	23	44	70	−26	41	Relegated to Division One

Source: fchd.com rsssf.com
Rules for classification: 1) points; 2) goal difference; 3) number of goals scored.

=== Stadia and locations ===
Locations of the Premier Division clubs
Greater London Premier Division football clubs

Club	Stadium
Aldershot Town	Recreation Ground
Aylesbury United	Buckingham Road
Basingstoke Town	The Camrose
Billericay Town	New Lodge
Boreham Wood	Meadow Park
Canvey Island	Brockwell Stadium
Carshalton Athletic	War Memorial Sports Ground
Chesham United	The Meadow
Enfield	Meadow Park (groundshare with Boreham Wood)
Dagenham & Redbridge	Victoria Road
Dulwich Hamlet	Champion Hill
Farnborough Town	Cherrywood Road
Gravesend & Northfleet	Stonebridge Road
Hampton & Richmond Borough	Beveree Stadium
Harrow Borough	Earlsmead Stadium
Hendon	Claremont Road
Heybridge Swifts	Scraley Road
Hitchin Town	Top Field
Slough Town	Wexham Park
St Albans City	Clarence Park
Thurrock	Ship Lane
Walton & Hersham	The Sports Ground

== Division One ==
Isthmian League Division One
- Season: 1999–2000
- Champions: Croydon
- Promoted: Croydon; Grays Athletic; Maidenhead United
- Relegated: Chertsey Town; Leyton Pennant
- Matches: 462
- Goals: 1,320 (2.86 per match)
- Highest attendance: 919 – Bedford Town – Barton Rovers, (27 December)
- Total attendance: 103,536
- Average attendance: 224 (+10.9% to previous season)

Division One consisted of 22 clubs, including 17 clubs from the previous season and five new clubs:

Two clubs relegated from the Premier Division:

- Bishop's Stortford
- Bromley

Three clubs promoted from Division Two:

- Bedford Town
- Harlow Town
- Thame United

Croydon won the division and returned to the Premier Division. Grays Athletic and Maidenhead United also get a promotion. Chertsey Town and Leyton Pennant relegated to Division Two, while Leatherhead were reprieved after Hemel Hempstead were refused promotion from Division Two.

=== League table ===
Pos	Team	Pld	W	D	L	GF	GA	GD	Pts	Promotion or relegation
1	Croydon	42	25	9	8	85	47	+38	84	Promoted to the Premier Division
2	Grays Athletic	42	21	12	9	80	44	+36	75	Promoted to the Premier Division
3	Maidenhead United	42	20	15	7	72	45	+27	75	Promoted to the Premier Division
4	Thame United	42	20	13	9	61	38	+23	73	
5	Worthing	42	19	12	11	80	60	+20	69	
6	Staines Town	42	19	12	11	63	52	+11	69	
7	Whyteleafe	42	20	9	13	60	49	+11	69	
8	Bedford Town	42	17	12	13	59	52	+7	63	
9	Bromley	42	17	9	16	62	65	−3	60	
10	Uxbridge	42	15	13	14	60	44	+16	58	
11	Bishop's Stortford	42	16	10	16	57	62	−5	58	
12	Barton Rovers	42	16	8	18	64	83	−19	56	
13	Oxford City	42	17	4	21	57	55	+2	55	
14	Braintree Town	42	15	10	17	65	74	−9	55	
15	Yeading	42	12	18	12	53	54	−1	54	
16	Wealdstone	42	13	12	17	51	58	−7	51	
17	Bognor Regis Town	42	12	13	17	47	53	−6	49	
18	Harlow Town	42	11	13	18	62	76	−14	46	
19	Romford	42	12	9	21	51	70	−19	45	
20	Leatherhead	42	9	13	20	47	70	−23	40	Reprieved from relegation
21	Chertsey Town	42	9	5	28	50	84	−34	32	Relegated to Division Two
22	Leyton Pennant	42	7	9	26	34	85	−51	30	Relegated to Division Two

Source: fchd.com rsssf.com
Rules for classification: 1) points; 2) goal difference; 3) number of goals scored.

=== Stadia and locations ===
Locations of the Division One clubs
Greater London Division One football clubs

Club	Stadium
Barton Rovers	Sharpenhoe Road
Bedford Town	The Eyrie
Bishop's Stortford	Woodside Park
Bognor Regis Town	Nyewood Lane
Braintree Town	Cressing Road
Bromley	Hayes Lane
Chertsey Town	Alwyns Lane
Croydon	Croydon Sports Arena
Grays Athletic	New Recreation Ground
Harlow Town	Harlow Sportcentre
Leatherhead	Fetcham Grove
Leyton Pennant	Wadham Lodge
Maidenhead United	York Road
Oxford City	Marsh Lane
Romford	Sungate
Staines Town	Wheatsheaf Park
Thame United	Windmill Road
Uxbridge	Honeycroft
Wealdstone	White Lion (groundshare with Edgware Town)
Whyteleafe	Church Road
Worthing	Woodside Road
Yeading	The Warren

== Division Two ==
Isthmian League Division Two
- Season: 1999–2000
- Champions: Hemel Hempstead Town
- Promoted: Ford United; Northwood
- Relegated: Chalfont St Peter; Wingate & Finchley; Witham Town
- Matches: 462
- Goals: 1,489 (3.22 per match)
- Highest attendance: 464 – Northwood – Hemel Hempstead Town, (29 April)
- Total attendance: 49,201
- Average attendance: 106 (-19.7% to previous season)

Division Two consisted of 22 clubs, including 16 clubs from the previous season and six new clubs:

Three clubs relegated from Division One:

- Berkhamsted Town
- Molesey
- Wembley

Three clubs promoted from Division Three:

- Cheshunt
- Ford United
- Wingate & Finchley

Hemel Hempstead Town won the division, but were refused promotion due to ground grading. Northwood were promoted to Division One along with Ford United who get a second consecutive promotion. Wingate & Finchley finished in relegation zone along with Witham Town and Chalfont St Peter and returned to Division Three.

=== League table ===
Pos	Team	Pld	W	D	L	GF	GA	GD	Pts	Promotion or relegation
1	Hemel Hempstead Town	42	31	8	3	98	27	+71	101	
2	Northwood	42	29	9	4	109	40	+69	96	Promoted to Division One
3	Ford United	42	28	8	6	108	41	+67	92	Promoted to Division One
4	Berkhamsted Town	42	22	8	12	75	52	+23	74	
5	Windsor & Eton	42	20	13	9	73	53	+20	73	
6	Wivenhoe Town	42	20	9	13	61	47	+14	69	
7	Barking	42	18	13	11	70	51	+19	67	
8	Marlow	42	20	4	18	86	66	+20	64	
9	Metropolitan Police	42	18	7	17	75	71	+4	61	
10	Banstead Athletic	42	16	11	15	55	56	−1	59	
11	Tooting & Mitcham United	42	16	7	19	72	74	−2	55	
12	Wokingham Town	42	15	9	18	58	80	−22	54	
13	Wembley	42	14	11	17	47	53	−6	53	
14	Edgware Town	42	13	11	18	72	71	+1	50	
15	Hungerford Town	42	13	10	19	61	78	−17	49	
16	Cheshunt	42	12	12	18	53	65	−12	48	
17	Horsham	42	13	8	21	66	81	−15	47	
18	Leighton Town	42	13	8	21	65	84	−19	47	
19	Molesey	42	10	12	20	54	69	−15	42	
20	Wingate & Finchley	42	11	7	24	54	97	−43	40	Relegated to Division Three
21	Witham Town	42	7	9	26	39	110	−71	30	Relegated to Division Three
22	Chalfont St Peter	42	2	8	32	39	124	−85	14	Relegated to Division Three

Source: fchd.com rsssf.com
Rules for classification: 1) points; 2) goal difference; 3) number of goals scored.

=== Stadia and locations ===
Locations of the Division Two clubs
Greater London Division Two football clubs

Club	Stadium
Banstead Athletic	Merland Rise
Barking	Mayesbrook Park
Berkhamsted Town	Broadwater
Chalfont St Peter	Mill Meadow
Cheshunt	Cheshunt Stadium
Edgware Town	White Lion
Ford United	Oakside
Hemel Hempstead Town	Vauxhall Road
Horsham	Queen Street
Hungerford Town	Bulpit Lane
Leighton Town	Bell Close
Marlow	Alfred Davis Memorial Ground
Metropolitan Police	Imber Court
Molesey	Walton Road Stadium
Northwood	Chestnut Avenue
Tooting & Mitcham United	Imperial Fields
Wembley	Vale Farm
Windsor & Eton	Stag Meadow
Wingate & Finchley	The Harry Abrahams Stadium
Witham Town	Spa Road
Wivenhoe Town	Broad Lane
Wokingham Town	Cantley Park

== Division Three ==
Isthmian League Division Three
- Season: 1999–2000
- Champions: East Thurrock United
- Promoted: East Thurrock United; Great Wakering Rovers; Tilbury
- Matches: 420
- Goals: 1,326 (3.16 per match)
- Highest attendance: 521 – Hertford Town – Ware, (27 December)
- Total attendance: 34,483
- Average attendance: 82 (+7.9% to previous season)

Division Three consisted of 21 clubs, including 17 clubs from the previous season and four new clubs:

- Abingdon Town, relegated from Division Two
- Bracknell Town, relegated from Division Two
- Great Wakering Rovers, promoted as runners-up of the Essex Senior League
- Hertford Town, relegated from Division Two

Great Wakering Rovers debuted in the league and achieved promotion at the first attempt along with East Thurrock United and Tilbury. Southall resigned and joined the Combined Counties League.

=== League table ===
Pos	Team	Pld	W	D	L	GF	GA	GD	Pts	Promotion or relegation
1	East Thurrock United	40	26	7	7	89	42	+47	85	Promoted to Division Two
2	Great Wakering Rovers	40	25	7	8	81	41	+40	82	Promoted to Division Two
3	Tilbury	40	21	12	7	67	39	+28	75	Promoted to Division Two
4	Hornchurch	40	19	12	9	72	57	+15	69	
5	Croydon Athletic	40	19	11	10	85	52	+33	68	
6	Epsom & Ewell	40	18	12	10	67	46	+21	66	
7	Lewes	40	18	10	12	73	51	+22	64	
8	Bracknell Town	40	15	16	9	81	64	+17	61	
9	Aveley	40	17	10	13	73	64	+9	61	
10	Corinthian-Casuals	40	16	10	14	59	51	+8	58	
11	Flackwell Heath	40	17	6	17	74	76	−2	57	
12	Ware	40	16	8	16	74	62	+12	56	
13	Egham Town	40	14	13	13	48	43	+5	55	
14	Hertford Town	40	15	10	15	63	60	+3	55	
15	Abingdon Town	40	10	12	18	48	64	−16	42	
16	Kingsbury Town	40	11	8	21	55	86	−31	41	
17	Camberley Town	40	11	7	22	44	79	−35	40	
18	Tring Town	40	10	9	21	37	64	−27	39	
19	Dorking	40	9	10	21	53	69	−16	37	
20	Clapton	40	9	7	24	50	93	−43	34	
21	Southall	40	3	5	32	33	123	−90	14	Relegated to the Combined Counties League

Source: fchd.com rsssf.com
Rules for classification: 1) points; 2) goal difference; 3) number of goals scored.

=== Stadia and locations ===
Locations of the Division Three clubs
Greater London Division Three football clubs

Club	Stadium
Abingdon Town	Culham Road
Aveley	The Mill Field
Bracknell Town	Larges Lane
Camberley Town	Kroomer Park
Clapton	The Old Spotted Dog Ground
Corinthian-Casuals	King George's Field
Croydon Athletic	Keith Tuckey Stadium
Dorking	Meadowbank Stadium
East Thurrock United	Rookery Hill
Egham Town	The Runnymede Stadium
Epsom & Ewell	Merland Rise (groundshare with Banstead Athletic)
Flackwell Heath	Wilks Park
Great Wakering Rovers	Burroughs Park
Hertford Town	Hertingfordbury Park
Hornchurch	Hornchurch Stadium
Kingsbury Town	Avenue Park
Lewes	The Dripping Pan
Southall	Robert Parker Stadium
Tilbury	Chadfields
Tring Town	Pendley Ground
Ware	Wodson Park

== See also ==
- Isthmian League
- 1999–2000 Northern Premier League
- 1999–2000 Southern Football League
