= 1996–97 Isthmian League =

The 1996–97 season was the 82nd season of the Isthmian League, which is an English football competition featuring semi-professional and amateur clubs from London, East and South East England. The league consisted of four divisions.

== Premier Division ==
Isthmian League Premier Division
- Season: 1996–97
- Champions: Yeovil Town
- Promoted: Yeovil Town
- Relegated: Chertsey Town; Grays Athletic; Staines Town
- Matches: 462
- Goals: 1,362 (2.95 per match)
- Highest attendance: 8,007 – Yeovil Town – Enfield, (25 March)
- Total attendance: 230,209
- Average attendance: 498 (+2.9% to previous season)

The Premier Division consisted of 22 clubs, including 18 clubs from the previous season and four new clubs:

- Dagenham & Redbridge, relegated from the Football Conference
- Heybridge Swifts, promoted as runners-up in Division One
- Oxford City, promoted as champions of Division One
- Staines Town, promoted as third in Division One

=== League table ===
Pos	Team	Pld	W	D	L	GF	GA	GD	Pts	Promotion or relegation
1	Yeovil Town	42	31	8	3	83	34	+49	101	Promoted to the Football Conference
2	Enfield	42	28	11	3	91	29	+62	95	
3	Sutton United	42	18	13	11	87	70	+17	67	
4	Dagenham & Redbridge	42	18	11	13	57	43	+14	65	
5	St Albans City	42	18	11	13	66	55	+11	65	
6	Yeading	42	17	14	11	58	47	+11	65	
7	Heybridge Swifts	42	17	14	11	64	60	+4	65	
8	Aylesbury United	42	17	11	14	62	56	+6	62	
9	Purfleet	42	17	11	14	67	63	+4	62	
10	Boreham Wood	42	15	13	14	56	52	+4	58	
11	Kingstonian	42	16	8	18	79	79	0	56	
12	Dulwich Hamlet	42	14	13	15	57	57	0	55	
13	Carshalton Athletic	42	14	11	17	51	56	−5	53	
14	Hitchin Town	42	15	7	20	67	73	−6	52	
15	Oxford City	42	14	10	18	67	83	−16	52	
16	Hendon	42	13	12	17	53	59	−6	51	
17	Harrow Borough	42	12	14	16	58	63	−5	50	
18	Bromley	42	13	9	20	67	72	−5	48	
19	Bishop's Stortford	42	10	13	19	43	64	−21	43	
20	Staines Town	42	10	8	24	46	71	−25	38	Relegated to Division One
21	Grays Athletic	42	8	9	25	43	78	−35	33	Relegated to Division One
22	Chertsey Town	42	8	7	27	40	98	−58	31	Relegated to Division One

Source: fchd.com rsssf.com
Rules for classification: 1) points; 2) goal difference; 3) number of goals scored.

=== Stadia and locations ===
Locations of the Premier Division clubs
Greater London Premier Division football clubs
Somerset Premier Division football clubs

Club	Stadium
Aylesbury United	Buckingham Road
Bishop's Stortford	Woodside Park
Boreham Wood	Meadow Park
Bromley	Hayes Lane
Carshalton Athletic	War Memorial Sports Ground
Chertsey Town	Alwyns Lane
Enfield	Meadow Park (groundshare with Boreham Wood)
Dagenham & Redbridge	Victoria Road
Dulwich Hamlet	Champion Hill
Grays Athletic	New Recreation Ground
Harrow Borough	Earlsmead Stadium
Hendon	Claremont Road
Heybridge Swifts	Scraley Road
Hitchin Town	Top Field
Kingstonian	Kingsmeadow
Oxford City	Marsh Lane
St Albans City	Clarence Park
Staines Town	Wheatsheaf Park
Sutton United	Gander Green Lane
Thurrock	Ship Lane
Yeading	The Warren
Yeovil Town	Huish Park

== Division One ==
Isthmian League Division One
- Season: 1996–97
- Champions: Chesham United
- Promoted: Basingstoke Town; Chesham United; Walton & Hersham
- Relegated: Canvey Island; Marlow; Tooting & Mitcham United
- Matches: 462
- Goals: 1,254 (2.71 per match)
- Highest attendance: 2,262 – Aldershot Town – Basingstoke Town, (31 March)
- Total attendance: 139,574
- Average attendance: 302 (+10.6% to previous season)

Division One consisted of 22 clubs, including 16 clubs from the previous season and six new teams:

Three clubs relegated from the Premier Division:

- Molesey
- Walton & Hersham
- Worthing

Three clubs promoted from Division Two:

- Canvey Island
- Croydon
- Hampton

=== League table ===
Pos	Team	Pld	W	D	L	GF	GA	GD	Pts	Promotion or relegation
1	Chesham United	42	27	6	9	80	46	+34	87	Promoted to the Premier Division
2	Basingstoke Town	42	22	13	7	81	38	+43	79	Promoted to the Premier Division
3	Walton & Hersham	42	21	13	8	67	41	+26	76	Promoted to the Premier Division
4	Hampton	42	21	12	9	62	39	+23	75	
5	Billericay Town	42	21	12	9	69	49	+20	75	
6	Bognor Regis Town	42	21	9	12	63	44	+19	72	
7	Aldershot Town	42	19	14	9	67	45	+22	71	
8	Uxbridge	42	15	17	10	65	48	+17	62	
9	Whyteleafe	42	18	7	17	71	68	+3	61	
10	Molesey	42	17	9	16	50	53	−3	60	
11	Abingdon Town	42	15	11	16	44	42	+2	56	
12	Leyton Pennant	42	14	12	16	71	72	−1	54	
13	Maidenhead United	42	15	10	17	57	57	0	52 (Note: 3 points deducted)	
14	Wokingham Town	42	14	10	18	41	45	−4	52	
15	Thame United	42	13	10	19	57	69	−12	49	
16	Worthing	42	11	11	20	58	77	−19	44	
17	Barton Rovers	42	11	11	20	31	58	−27	44	
18	Croydon	42	11	10	21	40	57	−17	43	
19	Berkhamsted Town	42	11	9	22	47	66	−19	42	
20	Canvey Island	42	9	14	19	52	71	−19	41	Relegated to Division Two
21	Marlow	42	11	6	25	41	84	−43	39	Relegated to Division Two
22	Tooting & Mitcham United	42	8	8	26	40	85	−45	32	Relegated to Division Two

Source: fchd.com rsssf.com
Rules for classification: 1) points; 2) goal difference; 3) number of goals scored.

=== Stadia and locations ===
Locations of the Division One clubs
Greater London Division One football clubs

Club	Stadium
Abingdon Town	Culham Road
Aldershot Town	Recreation Ground
Barton Rovers	Sharpenhoe Road
Basingstoke Town	The Camrose
Berkhamsted Town	Broadwater
Billericay Town	New Lodge
Bognor Regis Town	Nyewood Lane
Canvey Island	Brockwell Stadium
Chesham United	The Meadow
Croydon	Croydon Sports Arena
Hampton	Beveree Stadium
Leyton Pennant	Wadham Lodge
Maidenhead United	York Road
Marlow	Alfred Davis Memorial Ground
Molesey	Walton Road Stadium
Thame United	Windmill Road
Tooting & Mitcham United	Imperial Fields
Uxbridge	Honeycroft
Walton & Hersham	The Sports Ground
Whyteleafe	Church Road
Wokingham Town	Cantley Park
Worthing	Woodside Road

== Division Two ==
Isthmian League Division Two
- Season: 1996–97
- Champions: Collier Row & Romford
- Promoted: Leatherhead; Collier Row & Romford; Wembley
- Relegated: Dorking; Hemel Hempstead; Ware
- Matches: 462
- Goals: 1,451 (3.14 per match)
- Highest attendance: 820 – Collier Row & Romford – Leatherhead, (15 April)
- Total attendance: 62,737
- Average attendance: 136 (+17.2% to previous season)

Division Two consisted of 22 clubs, including 17 clubs from the previous season and five new clubs:

Two clubs relegated from Division One:

- Barking
- Wembley

Three clubs promoted from Division Three:

- Horsham
- Leighton Town
- Windsor & Eton

Also, Collier Row & Romford, formed from a merger between Collier Row and Romford

=== League table ===
Pos	Team	Pld	W	D	L	GF	GA	GD	Pts	Promotion or relegation
1	Collier Row & Romford	42	28	12	2	93	33	+60	96	Promoted to Division One
2	Leatherhead	42	30	5	7	116	45	+71	95	Promoted to Division One
3	Wembley	42	23	11	8	91	44	+47	80	Promoted to Division One
4	Barking	42	22	13	7	68	39	+29	79	
5	Horsham	42	22	11	9	78	48	+30	77	
6	Edgware Town	42	20	14	8	74	50	+24	74	
7	Bedford Town	42	21	8	13	77	43	+34	71	
8	Banstead Athletic	42	21	5	16	75	52	+23	68	
9	Windsor & Eton	42	17	13	12	65	62	+3	64	
10	Leighton Town	42	17	12	13	64	52	+12	63	
11	Wivenhoe Town	42	17	9	16	69	62	+7	60	
12	Bracknell Town	42	16	10	16	78	72	+6	58	
13	Chalfont St Peter	42	14	13	15	53	61	−8	55	
14	Hungerford Town	42	14	13	15	68	77	−9	55	
15	Metropolitan Police	42	14	7	21	72	75	−3	49	
16	Tilbury	42	14	7	21	68	77	−9	49	
17	Witham Town	42	11	11	20	40	67	−27	44	
18	Egham Town	42	10	9	23	47	86	−39	39	
19	Cheshunt	42	9	3	30	37	101	−64	30	
20	Ware	42	7	8	27	44	80	−36	29	Relegated to Division Three
21	Dorking	42	7	6	29	40	100	−60	27	Relegated to Division Three
22	Hemel Hempstead	42	5	6	31	34	125	−91	21	Relegated to Division Three

Source: fchd.com rsssf.com
Rules for classification: 1) points; 2) goal difference; 3) number of goals scored.

=== Stadia and locations ===
Locations of the Division Two clubs
Greater London Division Two football clubs

Club	Stadium
Banstead Athletic	Merland Rise
Barking	Mayesbrook Park
Bedford Town	The Eyrie
Bracknell Town	Larges Lane
Chalfont St Peter	Mill Meadow
Cheshunt	Cheshunt Stadium
Collier Row & Romford	Sungate
Dorking	Meadowbank Stadium
Edgware Town	White Lion
Egham Town	The Runnymede Stadium
Hemel Hempstead	Vauxhall Road
Horsham	Queen Street
Hungerford Town	Bulpit Lane
Leatherhead	Fetcham Grove
Leighton Town	Bell Close
Metropolitan Police	Imber Court
Tilbury	Chadfields
Ware	Wodson Park
Wembley	Vale Farm
Windsor & Eton	Stag Meadow
Witham Town	Spa Road
Wivenhoe Town	Broad Lane

== Division Three ==
Isthmian League Division Three
- Season: 1996–97
- Champions: Wealdstone
- Promoted: Braintree Town; Northwood; Wealdstone
- Matches: 272
- Goals: 886 (3.26 per match)
- Highest attendance: 630 – Wealdstone – Epsom & Ewell, (19 April)
- Total attendance: 30,404
- Average attendance: 112 (+9.8% to previous season)

Division Three consisted of 17 clubs, including 16 clubs from the previous season and one new club:

- Braintree Town, transferred from Southern League Southern Division

Before the start of the season Cove and Harefield United resigned from the league.

=== League table ===
Pos	Team	Pld	W	D	L	GF	GA	GD	Pts	Promotion or relegation
1	Wealdstone	32	24	3	5	72	24	+48	75	Promoted to Division Two
2	Braintree Town	32	23	5	4	99	29	+70	74	Promoted to Division Two
3	Northwood	32	18	10	4	60	31	+29	64	Promoted to Division Two
4	Harlow Town	32	19	4	9	60	41	+19	61	
5	Aveley	32	17	6	9	64	39	+25	57	
6	East Thurrock United	32	16	6	10	58	51	+7	54	
7	Camberley Town	32	15	6	11	55	44	+11	51	
8	Wingate & Finchley	32	11	7	14	52	63	−11	40	
9	Hornchurch	32	11	6	15	35	51	−16	39	
10	Clapton	32	11	6	15	31	49	−18	39	
11	Lewes	32	10	8	14	45	53	−8	38	
12	Kingsbury Town	32	11	4	17	41	54	−13	37	
13	Hertford Town	32	10	6	16	55	65	−10	36	
14	Epsom & Ewell	32	8	5	19	62	78	−16	29	
15	Flackwell Heath	32	8	5	19	36	71	−35	29	
16	Tring Town	32	7	3	22	33	74	−41	24	
17	Southall	32	6	4	22	28	69	−41	22	

Source: fchd.com rsssf.com
Rules for classification: 1) points; 2) goal difference; 3) number of goals scored.

=== Stadia and locations ===
Locations of the Division Three clubs
Greater London Division Three football clubs

Club	Stadium
Aveley	The Mill Field
Braintree Town	Cressing Road
Camberley Town	Kroomer Park
Clapton	The Old Spotted Dog Ground
East Thurrock United	Rookery Hill
Epsom & Ewell	Merland Rise (groundshare with Banstead Athletic)
Flackwell Heath	Wilks Park
Harlow Town	Harlow Sportcentre
Hertford Town	Hertingfordbury Park
Hornchurch	Hornchurch Stadium
Kingsbury Town	Avenue Park
Lewes	The Dripping Pan
Northwood	Chestnut Avenue
Southall	Robert Parker Stadium
Tring Town	Pendley Ground
Wealdstone	White Lion (groundshare with Edgware Town)
Wingate & Finchley	The Harry Abrahams Stadium

== See also ==
- Isthmian League
- 1996–97 Northern Premier League
- 1996–97 Southern Football League
