= 1997–98 Isthmian League =

The 1997–98 season was the 83rd season of the Isthmian League, which is an English football competition featuring semi-professional and amateur clubs from London, East and South East England. The league consisted of four divisions.

== Premier Division ==
Isthmian League Premier Division
- Season: 1997–98
- Champions: Kingstonian
- Promoted: Kingstonian
- Relegated: Hitchin Town; Oxford City; Yeading
- Matches: 462
- Goals: 1,343 (2.91 per match)
- Highest attendance: 2,019 – Kingstonian – Sutton United, (15 November)
- Total attendance: 206,905
- Average attendance: 448 (-10.0% to previous season)

The Premier Division consisted of 22 clubs, including 18 clubs from the previous season and four new clubs:

- Basingstoke Town, promoted as runners-up in Division One
- Chesham United, promoted as champions of Division One
- Gravesend & Northfleet, transferred from the Southern League
- Walton & Hersham, promoted as third in Division One

Kingstonian won the division and were promoted to the Football Conference to reach the highest level in the club history. Yeading, Hitchin Town and Oxford City finished bottom of the table and relegated to the First Division.

=== League table ===
| Pos | Team | Pld | W | D | L | GF | GA | GD | Pts | Promotion or relegation |
|---|---|---|---|---|---|---|---|---|---|---|
| 1 | Kingstonian | 42 | 25 | 12 | 5 | 84 | 35 | +49 | 87 | Promoted to the Football Conference |
| 2 | Boreham Wood | 42 | 23 | 11 | 8 | 81 | 42 | +39 | 80 | |
| 3 | Sutton United | 42 | 22 | 12 | 8 | 83 | 56 | +27 | 78 | |
| 4 | Dagenham & Redbridge | 42 | 21 | 10 | 11 | 73 | 50 | +23 | 73 | |
| 5 | Hendon | 42 | 21 | 10 | 11 | 69 | 50 | +19 | 73 | |
| 6 | Heybridge Swifts | 42 | 18 | 11 | 13 | 74 | 62 | +12 | 65 | |
| 7 | Enfield | 42 | 18 | 8 | 16 | 66 | 58 | +8 | 62 | |
| 8 | Basingstoke Town | 42 | 17 | 11 | 14 | 56 | 60 | −4 | 62 | |
| 9 | Walton & Hersham | 42 | 18 | 6 | 18 | 50 | 70 | −20 | 60 | |
| 10 | Purfleet | 42 | 15 | 13 | 14 | 57 | 58 | −1 | 58 | |
| 11 | St Albans City | 42 | 17 | 7 | 18 | 54 | 59 | −5 | 58 | |
| 12 | Harrow Borough | 42 | 15 | 10 | 17 | 60 | 67 | −7 | 55 | |
| 13 | Gravesend & Northfleet | 42 | 15 | 8 | 19 | 65 | 67 | −2 | 53 | |
| 14 | Chesham United | 42 | 14 | 10 | 18 | 71 | 70 | +1 | 52 | |
| 15 | Bromley | 42 | 13 | 13 | 16 | 53 | 53 | 0 | 52 | |
| 16 | Dulwich Hamlet | 42 | 13 | 11 | 18 | 56 | 67 | −11 | 50 | |
| 17 | Carshalton Athletic | 42 | 13 | 9 | 20 | 54 | 77 | −23 | 48 | |
| 18 | Aylesbury United | 42 | 13 | 8 | 21 | 55 | 70 | −15 | 47 | |
| 19 | Bishop's Stortford | 42 | 14 | 5 | 23 | 53 | 69 | −16 | 47 | |
| 20 | Yeading | 42 | 12 | 11 | 19 | 49 | 65 | −16 | 47 | Relegated to Division One |
| 21 | Hitchin Town | 42 | 8 | 15 | 19 | 45 | 62 | −17 | 39 | Relegated to Division One |
| 22 | Oxford City | 42 | 7 | 9 | 26 | 35 | 76 | −41 | 30 | Relegated to Division One |

Source: fchd.com rsssf.com
Rules for classification: 1) points; 2) goal difference; 3) number of goals scored.

=== Stadia and locations ===
Locations of the Premier Division clubs
Greater London Premier Division football clubs

| Club | Stadium |
|---|---|
| Aylesbury United | Buckingham Road |
| Basingstoke Town | The Camrose |
| Bishop's Stortford | Woodside Park |
| Boreham Wood | Meadow Park |
| Bromley | Hayes Lane |
| Carshalton Athletic | War Memorial Sports Ground |
| Chesham United | The Meadow |
| Enfield | Meadow Park (groundshare with Boreham Wood) |
| Dagenham & Redbridge | Victoria Road |
| Dulwich Hamlet | Champion Hill |
| Gravesend & Northfleet | Stonebridge Road |
| Harrow Borough | Earlsmead Stadium |
| Hendon | Claremont Road |
| Heybridge Swifts | Scraley Road |
| Hitchin Town | Top Field |
| Kingstonian | Kingsmeadow |
| Oxford City | Marsh Lane |
| St Albans City | Clarence Park |
| Sutton United | Gander Green Lane |
| Thurrock | Ship Lane |
| Walton & Hersham | The Sports Ground |
| Yeading | The Warren |

== Division One ==
Isthmian League Division One
- Season: 1997–98
- Champions: Aldershot Town
- Promoted: Aldershot Town; Billericay Town; Hampton
- Relegated: Abingdon Town; Thame United; Wokingham Town
- Matches: 462
- Goals: 1,382 (2.99 per match)
- Highest attendance: 4,289 – Aldershot Town – Berkhamsted Town, (2 May)
- Total attendance: 142,653
- Average attendance: 309 (+2.3% to previous season)

Division One consisted of 22 clubs, including 16 clubs from the previous season and six new clubs: Three clubs relegated from the Premier Division:

- Chertsey Town
- Grays Athletic
- Staines Town

Three clubs promoted from Division Two:

- Leatherhead
- Collier Row & Romford
- Wembley

Before the start of the season Collier Row & Romford F.C. were renamed Romford.

Aldershot Town won the division and were promoted to the Premier Division along with Billericay Town and Hampton. Wokingham Town, Abingdon Town and Thame United relegated to Division Two.

=== League table ===
| Pos | Team | Pld | W | D | L | GF | GA | GD | Pts | Promotion or relegation |
|---|---|---|---|---|---|---|---|---|---|---|
| 1 | Aldershot Town | 42 | 28 | 8 | 6 | 89 | 36 | +53 | 92 | Promoted to the Premier Division |
| 2 | Billericay Town | 42 | 25 | 6 | 11 | 78 | 44 | +34 | 81 | Promoted to the Premier Division |
| 3 | Hampton | 42 | 22 | 15 | 5 | 75 | 47 | +28 | 81 | Promoted to the Premier Division |
| 4 | Maidenhead United | 42 | 25 | 5 | 12 | 76 | 37 | +39 | 80 | |
| 5 | Uxbridge | 42 | 23 | 6 | 13 | 66 | 59 | +7 | 75 | |
| 6 | Grays Athletic | 42 | 21 | 10 | 11 | 79 | 49 | +30 | 73 | |
| 7 | Romford | 42 | 21 | 8 | 13 | 92 | 59 | +33 | 71 | |
| 8 | Bognor Regis Town | 42 | 20 | 9 | 13 | 77 | 45 | +32 | 69 | |
| 9 | Leatherhead | 42 | 18 | 11 | 13 | 70 | 51 | +19 | 65 | |
| 10 | Leyton Pennant | 42 | 17 | 11 | 14 | 66 | 58 | +8 | 62 | |
| 11 | Chertsey Town | 42 | 16 | 13 | 13 | 83 | 70 | +13 | 61 | |
| 12 | Worthing | 42 | 17 | 6 | 19 | 64 | 71 | −7 | 57 | |
| 13 | Berkhamsted Town | 42 | 15 | 8 | 19 | 59 | 69 | −10 | 53 | |
| 14 | Staines Town | 42 | 13 | 10 | 19 | 54 | 71 | −17 | 49 | |
| 15 | Croydon | 42 | 13 | 10 | 19 | 47 | 64 | −17 | 49 | |
| 16 | Barton Rovers | 42 | 11 | 13 | 18 | 53 | 72 | −19 | 46 | |
| 17 | Wembley | 42 | 10 | 15 | 17 | 38 | 61 | −23 | 45 | |
| 18 | Molesey | 42 | 10 | 11 | 21 | 47 | 65 | −18 | 41 | |
| 19 | Whyteleafe | 42 | 10 | 10 | 22 | 48 | 83 | −35 | 40 | |
| 20 | Wokingham Town | 42 | 7 | 10 | 25 | 41 | 74 | −33 | 31 | Relegated to Division Two |
| 21 | Abingdon Town | 42 | 9 | 4 | 29 | 47 | 101 | −54 | 31 | Relegated to Division Two |
| 22 | Thame United | 42 | 7 | 9 | 26 | 33 | 96 | −63 | 30 | Relegated to Division Two |

Source: fchd.com rsssf.com
Rules for classification: 1) points; 2) goal difference; 3) number of goals scored.

=== Stadia and locations ===
Locations of the Division One clubs
Greater London Division One football clubs

| Club | Stadium |
|---|---|
| Abingdon Town | Culham Road |
| Aldershot Town | Recreation Ground |
| Barton Rovers | Sharpenhoe Road |
| Berkhamsted Town | Broadwater |
| Billericay Town | New Lodge |
| Bognor Regis Town | Nyewood Lane |
| Chertsey Town | Alwyns Lane |
| Croydon | Croydon Sports Arena |
| Grays Athletic | New Recreation Ground |
| Hampton | Beveree Stadium |
| Leatherhead | Fetcham Grove |
| Leyton Pennant | Wadham Lodge |
| Maidenhead United | York Road |
| Molesey | Walton Road Stadium |
| Romford | Sungate |
| Staines Town | Wheatsheaf Park |
| Thame United | Windmill Road |
| Uxbridge | Honeycroft |
| Wembley | Vale Farm |
| Whyteleafe | Church Road |
| Wokingham Town | Cantley Park |
| Worthing | Woodside Road |

== Division Two ==
Isthmian League Division Two
- Season: 1997–98
- Champions: Canvey Island
- Promoted: Braintree Town; Canvey Island; Wealdstone
- Relegated: Cheshunt; Egham Town; Tilbury
- Matches: 462
- Goals: 1,496 (3.24 per match)
- Highest attendance: 1,108 – Canvey Island – Braintree Town, (3 January)
- Total attendance: 78,257
- Average attendance: 169 (+24.3% to previous season)

Division Two consisted of 22 clubs, including 16 clubs from the previous season and six new clubs:

Three clubs relegated from Division One:

- Canvey Island
- Marlow
- Tooting & Mitcham United

Three clubs promoted from Division Three:

- Braintree Town
- Northwood
- Wealdstone

Canvey Island won the division and returned to Division One straight after relegation from it along with Braintree Town and Wealdstone, both achieved the second promotions in two seasons. Tilbury relegated to Division Three along with Egham Town and Abingdon Town.

=== League table ===
| Pos | Team | Pld | W | D | L | GF | GA | GD | Pts | Promotion or relegation |
|---|---|---|---|---|---|---|---|---|---|---|
| 1 | Canvey Island | 42 | 30 | 8 | 4 | 116 | 41 | +75 | 98 | Promoted to Division One |
| 2 | Braintree Town | 42 | 29 | 11 | 2 | 117 | 45 | +72 | 98 | Promoted to Division One |
| 3 | Wealdstone | 42 | 24 | 11 | 7 | 81 | 46 | +35 | 83 | Promoted to Division One |
| 4 | Bedford Town | 42 | 22 | 12 | 8 | 55 | 25 | +30 | 78 | |
| 5 | Metropolitan Police | 42 | 21 | 8 | 13 | 80 | 65 | +15 | 71 | |
| 6 | Wivenhoe Town | 42 | 18 | 12 | 12 | 84 | 66 | +18 | 66 | |
| 7 | Edgware Town | 42 | 18 | 10 | 14 | 81 | 65 | +16 | 64 | |
| 8 | Chalfont St Peter | 42 | 17 | 13 | 12 | 63 | 60 | +3 | 64 | |
| 9 | Northwood | 42 | 17 | 11 | 14 | 65 | 69 | −4 | 62 | |
| 10 | Windsor & Eton | 42 | 17 | 7 | 18 | 74 | 72 | +2 | 58 | |
| 11 | Tooting & Mitcham United | 42 | 16 | 9 | 17 | 58 | 56 | +2 | 57 | |
| 12 | Barking | 42 | 15 | 12 | 15 | 62 | 75 | −13 | 57 | |
| 13 | Banstead Athletic | 42 | 15 | 9 | 18 | 60 | 63 | −3 | 54 | |
| 14 | Marlow | 42 | 16 | 5 | 21 | 64 | 78 | −14 | 53 | |
| 15 | Horsham | 42 | 13 | 9 | 20 | 67 | 75 | −8 | 48 | |
| 16 | Bracknell Town | 42 | 13 | 8 | 21 | 68 | 93 | −25 | 47 | |
| 17 | Leighton Town | 42 | 13 | 6 | 23 | 45 | 78 | −33 | 45 | |
| 18 | Hungerford Town | 42 | 11 | 11 | 20 | 66 | 77 | −11 | 44 | |
| 19 | Witham Town | 42 | 9 | 13 | 20 | 55 | 68 | −13 | 40 | |
| 20 | Tilbury | 42 | 9 | 12 | 21 | 57 | 88 | −31 | 39 | Relegated to Division Three |
| 21 | Egham Town | 42 | 9 | 5 | 28 | 47 | 101 | −54 | 32 | Relegated to Division Three |
| 22 | Cheshunt | 42 | 4 | 10 | 28 | 31 | 90 | −59 | 22 | Relegated to Division Three |

Source: fchd.com rsssf.com
Rules for classification: 1) points; 2) goal difference; 3) number of goals scored.

=== Stadia and locations ===
Locations of the Division Two clubs
Greater London Division Two football clubs

| Club | Stadium |
|---|---|
| Banstead Athletic | Merland Rise |
| Barking | Mayesbrook Park |
| Bedford Town | The Eyrie |
| Bracknell Town | Larges Lane |
| Braintree Town | Cressing Road |
| Canvey Island | Brockwell Stadium |
| Chalfont St Peter | Mill Meadow |
| Cheshunt | Cheshunt Stadium |
| Edgware Town | White Lion |
| Egham Town | The Runnymede Stadium |
| Horsham | Queen Street |
| Hungerford Town | Bulpit Lane |
| Leighton Town | Bell Close |
| Marlow | Alfred Davis Memorial Ground |
| Metropolitan Police | Imber Court |
| Northwood | Chestnut Avenue |
| Tilbury | Chadfields |
| Tooting & Mitcham United | Imperial Fields |
| Wealdstone | White Lion (groundshare with Edgware Town) |
| Windsor & Eton | Stag Meadow |
| Witham Town | Spa Road |
| Wivenhoe Town | Broad Lane |

== Division Three ==
Isthmian League Division Three
- Season: 1997–98
- Champions: Hemel Hempstead
- Promoted: Harlow Town; Hemel Hempstead; Hertford Town
- Matches: 380
- Goals: 1,221 (3.21 per match)
- Highest attendance: 480 – Hertford Town – Ware, (27 December)
- Total attendance: 29,119
- Average attendance: 77 (-31.3% to previous season)

Division Three consisted of 20 clubs, including 14 clubs from the previous season and six new clubs:

Three clubs relegated from Division Two:

- Dorking
- Hemel Hempstead
- Ware

Plus:

- Corinthian-Casuals, promoted as runners-up in the Combined Counties League
- Croydon Athletic, promoted as third in the Spartan League
- Ford United, promoted as champions of the Essex Senior League

Hemel Hempstead won the division and returned to Division Two straight after relegation along with Hertford Town and Harlow Town.

=== League table ===
| Pos | Team | Pld | W | D | L | GF | GA | GD | Pts | Promotion or relegation |
|---|---|---|---|---|---|---|---|---|---|---|
| 1 | Hemel Hempstead | 38 | 27 | 6 | 5 | 84 | 28 | +56 | 87 | Promoted to Division Two |
| 2 | Hertford Town | 38 | 26 | 5 | 7 | 77 | 31 | +46 | 83 | Promoted to Division Two |
| 3 | Harlow Town | 38 | 24 | 11 | 3 | 81 | 42 | +39 | 83 | Promoted to Division Two |
| 4 | Camberley Town | 38 | 24 | 7 | 7 | 93 | 43 | +50 | 79 | |
| 5 | Ford United | 38 | 23 | 9 | 6 | 90 | 34 | +56 | 78 | |
| 6 | East Thurrock United | 38 | 23 | 7 | 8 | 70 | 40 | +30 | 76 | |
| 7 | Ware | 38 | 17 | 6 | 15 | 69 | 57 | +12 | 57 | |
| 8 | Epsom & Ewell | 38 | 17 | 6 | 15 | 68 | 57 | +11 | 57 | |
| 9 | Aveley | 38 | 16 | 7 | 15 | 65 | 57 | +8 | 55 | |
| 10 | Corinthian-Casuals | 38 | 16 | 6 | 16 | 59 | 57 | +2 | 54 | |
| 11 | Hornchurch | 38 | 12 | 9 | 17 | 55 | 68 | −13 | 45 | |
| 12 | Clapton | 38 | 13 | 6 | 19 | 46 | 61 | −15 | 45 | |
| 13 | Flackwell Heath | 38 | 12 | 9 | 17 | 50 | 76 | −26 | 45 | |
| 14 | Croydon Athletic | 38 | 12 | 7 | 19 | 58 | 63 | −5 | 43 | |
| 15 | Tring Town | 38 | 12 | 7 | 19 | 51 | 69 | −18 | 43 | |
| 16 | Southall | 38 | 10 | 6 | 22 | 41 | 85 | −44 | 36 | |
| 17 | Dorking | 38 | 9 | 6 | 23 | 49 | 94 | −45 | 33 | |
| 18 | Wingate & Finchley | 38 | 7 | 8 | 23 | 46 | 80 | −34 | 29 | |
| 19 | Lewes | 38 | 7 | 5 | 26 | 34 | 88 | −54 | 26 | |
| 20 | Kingsbury Town | 38 | 5 | 3 | 30 | 35 | 91 | −56 | 18 | |

Source: fchd.com rsssf.com
Rules for classification: 1) points; 2) goal difference; 3) number of goals scored.

=== Stadia and locations ===
Locations of the Division Three clubs
Greater London Division Three football clubs

| Club | Stadium |
|---|---|
| Aveley | The Mill Field |
| Camberley Town | Kroomer Park |
| Clapton | The Old Spotted Dog Ground |
| Corinthian-Casuals | King George's Field |
| Croydon Athletic | Keith Tuckey Stadium |
| Dorking | Meadowbank Stadium |
| East Thurrock United | Rookery Hill |
| Epsom & Ewell | Merland Rise (groundshare with Banstead Athletic) |
| Flackwell Heath | Wilks Park |
| Ford United | Oakside |
| Harlow Town | Harlow Sportcentre |
| Hemel Hempstead Town | Vauxhall Road |
| Hertford Town | Hertingfordbury Park |
| Hornchurch | Hornchurch Stadium |
| Kingsbury Town | Avenue Park |
| Lewes | The Dripping Pan |
| Southall | Robert Parker Stadium |
| Tring Town | Pendley Ground |
| Ware | Wodson Park |
| Wingate & Finchley | The Harry Abrahams Stadium |

== See also ==
- Isthmian League
- 1997–98 Northern Premier League
- 1997–98 Southern Football League
