= 1995–96 Isthmian League =

The 1995–96 season was the 81st season of the Isthmian League, which is an English football competition featuring semi-professional and amateur clubs from London, East and South East England. The league consisted of four divisions.

== Premier Division ==
Isthmian League Premier Division
- Season: 1995–96
- Champions: Hayes
- Promoted: Hayes
- Relegated: Molesey; Walton & Hersham; Worthing
- Matches: 462
- Goals: 1,323 (2.86 per match)
- Highest attendance: 3,804 – Yeovil Town – Enfield, (4 May)
- Total attendance: 223,459
- Average attendance: 484 (+7.6% to previous season)

The Premier Division consisted of 22 clubs, including 18 clubs from the previous season and four new clubs:

- Worthing, promoted as runners-up in Division One
- Boreham Wood, promoted as champions of Division One
- Chertsey Town, promoted as third in Division One
- Yeovil Town, relegated from the Football Conference

=== League table ===
Pos	Team	Pld	W	D	L	GF	GA	GD	Pts	Promotion or relegation
1	Hayes	42	24	14	4	76	32	+44	86	Promoted to the Football Conference
2	Enfield	42	26	8	8	78	35	+43	86	
3	Boreham Wood	42	24	11	7	69	29	+40	83	
4	Yeovil Town	42	23	11	8	83	51	+32	80	
5	Dulwich Hamlet	42	23	11	8	85	59	+26	80	
6	Carshalton Athletic	42	22	8	12	68	49	+19	74	
7	St Albans City	42	20	12	10	70	41	+29	72	
8	Kingstonian	42	20	11	11	62	38	+24	71	
9	Harrow Borough	42	19	10	13	70	56	+14	67	
10	Sutton United	42	17	14	11	71	56	+15	65	
11	Aylesbury United	42	17	12	13	71	58	+13	63	
12	Bishop's Stortford	42	16	9	17	61	62	−1	57	
13	Yeading	42	11	14	17	48	60	−12	47	
14	Hendon	42	12	10	20	52	65	−13	46	
15	Chertsey Town	42	13	6	23	45	71	−26	45	
16	Purfleet	42	12	8	22	48	67	−19	44	
17	Grays Athletic	42	11	11	20	43	63	−20	44	
18	Hitchin Town	42	10	10	22	41	74	−33	40	
19	Bromley	42	10	7	25	52	91	−39	37	
20	Molesey	42	9	9	24	46	81	−35	36	Relegated to Division One
21	Walton & Hersham	42	9	7	26	42	79	−37	34	Relegated to Division One
22	Worthing	42	4	7	31	42	106	−64	19	Relegated to Division One

Source: fchd.com rsssf.com
Rules for classification: 1) points; 2) goal difference; 3) number of goals scored.

=== Stadia and locations ===
Locations of the Premier Division clubs
Greater London Premier Division football clubs
Somerset Premier Division football clubs

Club	Stadium
Aylesbury United	Buckingham Road
Bishop's Stortford	Woodside Park
Boreham Wood	Meadow Park
Bromley	Hayes Lane
Carshalton Athletic	War Memorial Sports Ground
Chertsey Town	Alwyns Lane
Enfield	Southbury Road
Dulwich Hamlet	Champion Hill
Grays Athletic	New Recreation Ground
Hayes	Church Road
Harrow Borough	Earlsmead Stadium
Hendon	Claremont Road
Hitchin Town	Top Field
Kingstonian	Kingsmeadow
Molesey	Walton Road Stadium
St Albans City	Clarence Park
Sutton United	Gander Green Lane
Thurrock	Ship Lane
Walton & Hersham	The Sports Ground
Worthing	Woodside Road
Yeading	The Warren
Yeovil Town	Huish Park

== Division One ==
Isthmian League Division One
- Season: 1995–96
- Champions: Oxford City
- Promoted: Heybridge Swifts; Oxford City; Staines Town
- Relegated: Barking; Ruislip Manor; Wembley
- Matches: 462
- Goals: 1,417 (3.07 per match)
- Highest attendance: 2,141 – Aldershot Town – Barking, (6 April)
- Total attendance: 126,231
- Average attendance: 273 (-4.5% to previous season)

Division One consisted of 22 clubs, including 15 clubs from the previous season and seven new clubs:

Three clubs relegated from the Premier Division:

- Chesham United
- Marlow
- Wokingham Town

Three clubs promoted from Division Two:

- Barton Rovers
- Oxford City
- Thame United

Plus:

- Leyton Pennant replaced Leyton, who merged with Walthamstow Pennant.

=== League table ===
Pos	Team	Pld	W	D	L	GF	GA	GD	Pts	Promotion or relegation
1	Oxford City	42	28	7	7	98	60	+38	91	Promoted to the Premier Division
2	Heybridge Swifts	42	27	7	8	97	43	+54	88	Promoted to the Premier Division
3	Staines Town	42	23	11	8	82	59	+23	80	Promoted to the Premier Division
4	Leyton Pennant	42	22	7	13	77	57	+20	73	
5	Aldershot Town	42	21	9	12	81	46	+35	72	
6	Billericay Town	42	19	9	14	58	58	0	66	
7	Bognor Regis Town	42	18	11	13	71	53	+18	65	
8	Marlow	42	19	5	18	72	75	−3	62	
9	Basingstoke Town	42	16	13	13	70	60	+10	61	
10	Uxbridge	42	16	12	14	46	49	−3	60	
11	Wokingham Town	42	16	10	16	62	65	−3	58	
12	Chesham United	42	15	12	15	51	44	+7	57	
13	Thame United	42	14	13	15	64	73	−9	55	
14	Maidenhead United	42	12	14	16	50	63	−13	50	
15	Whyteleafe	42	12	13	17	71	81	−10	49	
16	Abingdon Town	42	13	9	20	63	80	−17	48	
17	Berkhamsted Town	42	12	10	20	52	67	−15	46	
18	Barton Rovers	42	12	10	20	69	87	−18	46	
19	Tooting & Mitcham United	42	11	10	21	45	64	−19	43	
20	Wembley	42	11	8	23	49	66	−17	41	Relegated to Division Two
21	Ruislip Manor	42	11	8	23	54	77	−23	41	Resigned and joined the Spartan League
22	Barking	42	4	12	26	35	90	−55	24	Relegated to Division Two

Source: fchd.com rsssf.com
Rules for classification: 1) points; 2) goal difference; 3) number of goals scored.

=== Stadia and locations ===
Locations of the Division One clubs
Greater London Division One football clubs

Club	Stadium
Abingdon Town	Culham Road
Aldershot Town	Recreation Ground
Barking	Mayesbrook Park
Barton Rovers	Sharpenhoe Road
Basingstoke Town	The Camrose
Berkhamsted Town	Broadwater
Billericay Town	New Lodge
Bognor Regis Town	Nyewood Lane
Chesham United	The Meadow
Heybridge Swifts	Scraley Road
Leyton Pennant	Wadham Lodge
Maidenhead United	York Road
Marlow	Alfred Davis Memorial Ground
Oxford City	Marsh Lane
Ruislip Manor	Grosvenor Vale
Staines Town	Wheatsheaf Park
Thame United	Windmill Road
Tooting & Mitcham United	Imperial Fields
Uxbridge	Honeycroft
Wembley	Vale Farm
Whyteleafe	Church Road
Wokingham Town	Cantley Park

== Division Two ==
Isthmian League Division Two
- Season: 1995–96
- Champions: Canvey Island
- Promoted: Canvey Island; Croydon; Hampton
- Relegated: None
- Matches: 420
- Goals: 1,294 (3.08 per match)
- Highest attendance: 701 – Canvey Island – Croydon, (27 April)
- Total attendance: 48,815
- Average attendance: 116 (+16.0% to previous season)

Division Two consisted of 21 clubs, including 16 clubs from the previous season and five new clubs:

Two clubs relegated from Division One:

- Wivenhoe Town
- Dorking

Three clubs promoted from Division Three:

- Canvey Island
- Collier Row
- Bedford Town

Division started the season one club short after Newbury Town folded. At the end of the season Saffron Walden Town resigned from the league due to ground grading problems and joined the Essex Senior League. Thus, no teams were relegated from the Second Division this season.

=== League table ===
Pos	Team	Pld	W	D	L	GF	GA	GD	Pts	Promotion or relegation
1	Canvey Island	40	25	12	3	91	36	+55	87	Promoted to Division One
2	Croydon	40	25	6	9	78	42	+36	81	Promoted to Division One
3	Hampton	40	23	10	7	74	44	+30	79	Promoted to Division One
4	Banstead Athletic	40	21	11	8	72	36	+36	74	
5	Collier Row	40	21	11	8	73	41	+32	74	
6	Wivenhoe Town	40	21	8	11	82	57	+25	71	
7	Metropolitan Police	40	18	10	12	57	45	+12	64	
8	Bedford Town	40	18	10	12	67	59	+8	64	
9	Bracknell Town	40	18	8	14	69	50	+19	62	
10	Edgware Town	40	16	9	15	72	67	+5	57	
11	Tilbury	40	12	11	17	52	62	−10	47	
12	Ware	40	13	8	19	55	80	−25	47	
13	Chalfont St Peter	40	11	13	16	58	63	−5	46	
14	Leatherhead	40	12	10	18	71	77	−6	46	
15	Saffron Walden Town	40	11	12	17	56	58	−2	45	Resigned to the Essex Senior League
16	Cheshunt	40	10	12	18	56	90	−34	42	
17	Hemel Hempstead	40	10	10	20	46	62	−16	40	
18	Egham Town	40	12	3	25	42	74	−32	39	
19	Witham Town	40	8	10	22	35	68	−33	34	
20	Hungerford Town	40	9	7	24	44	79	−35	34	Reprieved from relegation
21	Dorking	40	8	5	27	44	104	−60	29	Reprieved from relegation

Source: fchd.com rsssf.com
Rules for classification: 1) points; 2) goal difference; 3) number of goals scored.

=== Stadia and locations ===
Locations of the Division Two clubs
Greater London Division Two football clubs

Club	Stadium
Banstead Athletic	Merland Rise
Bedford Town	The Eyrie
Bracknell Town	Larges Lane
Canvey Island	Brockwell Stadium
Chalfont St Peter	Mill Meadow
Cheshunt	Cheshunt Stadium
Croydon	Croydon Sports Arena
Collier Row & Romford	Sungate
Dorking	Meadowbank Stadium
Edgware Town	White Lion
Egham Town	The Runnymede Stadium
Hampton	Beveree Stadium
Hemel Hempstead	Vauxhall Road
Hungerford Town	Bulpit Lane
Leatherhead	Fetcham Grove
Metropolitan Police	Imber Court
Saffron Walden Town	Catons Lane
Tilbury	Chadfields
Ware	Wodson Park
Witham Town	Spa Road
Wivenhoe Town	Broad Lane

== Division Three ==
Isthmian League Division Three
- Season: 1995–96
- Champions: Horsham
- Promoted: Horsham; Leighton Town; Windsor & Eton
- Matches: 420
- Goals: 1,421 (3.38 per match)
- Highest attendance: 848 – Horsham – Leighton Town, (4 May)
- Total attendance: 42,721
- Average attendance: 102 (-9.7% to previous season)

Division Three consisted of 21 clubs, including 17 clubs from the previous season and four new teams:

Two clubs relegated from Division Two:

- Aveley
- Windsor & Eton

Plus:

- Wealdstone, transferred from Southern League Southern Division
- Wingate & Finchley, promoted as runners-up in the South Midlands League

=== League table ===
Pos	Team	Pld	W	D	L	GF	GA	GD	Pts	Promotion or relegation
1	Horsham	40	29	5	6	95	40	+55	92	Promoted to Division Two
2	Leighton Town	40	28	5	7	95	34	+61	89	Promoted to Division Two
3	Windsor & Eton	40	27	6	7	117	46	+71	87	Promoted to Division Two
4	Wealdstone	40	23	8	9	104	39	+65	77	
5	Harlow Town	40	22	10	8	85	62	+23	76	
6	Northwood	40	20	9	11	76	56	+20	69	
7	Epsom & Ewell	40	18	14	8	95	57	+38	68	
8	Kingsbury Town	40	15	16	9	61	48	+13	61	
9	East Thurrock United	40	17	8	15	61	50	+11	59	
10	Aveley	40	16	10	14	62	53	+9	58	
11	Wingate & Finchley	40	16	7	17	74	70	+4	55	
12	Lewes	40	14	7	19	56	72	−16	49	
13	Flackwell Heath	40	14	5	21	60	84	−24	47	
14	Hornchurch	40	11	8	21	55	77	−22	41	
15	Harefield United	40	11	7	22	49	89	−40	40	Resigned and joined the Spartan League
16	Tring Town	40	10	8	22	40	78	−38	38	
17	Camberley Town	40	9	9	22	45	81	−36	36	
18	Hertford Town	40	10	5	25	72	103	−31	35	
19	Cove	40	8	10	22	37	89	−52	34	Resigned and joined the Combined Counties League
20	Clapton	40	9	6	25	48	89	−41	33	
21	Southall	40	9	5	26	34	104	−70	32	

Source: fchd.com rsssf.com
Rules for classification: 1) points; 2) goal difference; 3) number of goals scored.

=== Stadia and locations ===
Locations of the Division Three clubs
Greater London Division Three football clubs

Club	Stadium
Aveley	The Mill Field
Camberley Town	Kroomer Park
Clapton	The Old Spotted Dog Ground
Cove	Oak Farm
East Thurrock United	Rookery Hill
Epsom & Ewell	Merland Rise (groundshare with Banstead Athletic)
Flackwell Heath	Wilks Park
Harefield United	Preston Park
Harlow Town	Harlow Sportcentre
Hertford Town	Hertingfordbury Park
Hornchurch	Hornchurch Stadium
Horsham	Queen Street
Kingsbury Town	Avenue Park
Leighton Town	Bell Close
Lewes	The Dripping Pan
Northwood	Chestnut Avenue
Southall	Robert Parker Stadium
Tring Town	Pendley Ground
Wealdstone	White Lion (groundshare with Edgware Town)
Windsor & Eton	Stag Meadow
Wingate & Finchley	The Harry Abrahams Stadium

== See also ==
- Isthmian League
- 1995–96 Northern Premier League
- 1995–96 Southern Football League
