= 1998–99 Isthmian League =

The 1998–99 season was the 84th season of the Isthmian League, which is an English football competition featuring semi-professional and amateur clubs from London, East and South East England. The league consisted of four divisions.

== Premier Division ==
Isthmian League Premier Division
- Season: 1998–99
- Champions: Sutton United
- Promoted: Sutton United
- Relegated: Bishop's Stortford; Bromley
- Matches: 462
- Goals: 1,356 (2.94 per match)
- Highest attendance: 2,810 – Basingstoke Town – Aldershot Town, (28 December)
- Total attendance: 263,644
- Average attendance: 571 (+27.4% to previous season)

The Premier Division consisted of 22 clubs, including 18 clubs from the previous season and four new clubs:

- Aldershot Town, promoted as champions of Division One
- Billericay Town, promoted as runners-up in Division One
- Hampton, promoted as third in Division One
- Slough Town, demoted from the Football Conference

Sutton United won the division and were promoted to the Football Conference. Bishop's Stortford and Bromley finished bottom of the table and relegated to Division One, while Carshalton Athletic were reprieved after Wealdstone, finished third in Division One, were refused promotion due to ground grading.

At the end of the season Hampton changed name into Hampton & Richmond Borough.

=== League table ===
Pos	Team	Pld	W	D	L	GF	GA	GD	Pts	Promotion or relegation
1	Sutton United	42	27	7	8	89	39	+50	88	Promoted to the Football Conference
2	Aylesbury United	42	23	8	11	67	38	+29	77	
3	Dagenham & Redbridge	42	20	13	9	71	44	+27	73	
4	Purfleet	42	22	7	13	71	52	+19	73	
5	Enfield	42	21	9	12	73	49	+24	72	
6	St Albans City	42	17	17	8	71	52	+19	68	
7	Aldershot Town	42	16	14	12	83	48	+35	62	
8	Basingstoke Town	42	17	10	15	63	53	+10	61	
9	Harrow Borough	42	17	9	16	72	66	+6	60	
10	Gravesend & Northfleet	42	18	6	18	54	53	+1	60	
11	Slough Town	42	16	11	15	60	53	+7	59	
12	Billericay Town	42	15	13	14	54	56	−2	58	
13	Hendon	42	16	9	17	70	71	−1	57	
14	Boreham Wood	42	14	15	13	59	63	−4	57	
15	Chesham United	42	15	9	18	58	79	−21	54	
16	Dulwich Hamlet	42	14	8	20	53	63	−10	50	
17	Heybridge Swifts	42	13	9	20	51	85	−34	48	
18	Walton & Hersham	42	12	7	23	50	77	−27	43	
19	Hampton	42	10	12	20	41	71	−30	42	
20	Carshalton Athletic	42	10	10	22	47	82	−35	40	Reprieved from relegation
21	Bishop's Stortford	42	9	10	23	49	90	−41	37	Relegated to Division One
22	Bromley	42	8	11	23	50	72	−22	35	Relegated to Division One

Source: fchd.com rsssf.com
Rules for classification: 1) points; 2) goal difference; 3) number of goals scored.

=== Stadia and locations ===
Locations of the Premier Division clubs
Greater London Premier Division football clubs

Club	Stadium
Aldershot Town	Recreation Ground
Aylesbury United	Buckingham Road
Basingstoke Town	The Camrose
Billericay Town	New Lodge
Bishop's Stortford	Woodside Park
Boreham Wood	Meadow Park
Bromley	Hayes Lane
Carshalton Athletic	War Memorial Sports Ground
Chesham United	The Meadow
Enfield	Meadow Park (groundshare with Boreham Wood)
Dagenham & Redbridge	Victoria Road
Dulwich Hamlet	Champion Hill
Gravesend & Northfleet	Stonebridge Road
Hampton & Richmond Borough	Beveree Stadium
Harrow Borough	Earlsmead Stadium
Hendon	Claremont Road
Heybridge Swifts	Scraley Road
Slough Town	Wexham Park
St Albans City	Clarence Park
Sutton United	Gander Green Lane
Thurrock	Ship Lane
Walton & Hersham	The Sports Ground

== Division One ==
Isthmian League Division One
- Season: 1998–99
- Champions: Canvey Island
- Promoted: Canvey Island; Hitchin Town
- Relegated: Berkhamsted Town; Molesey; Wembley
- Matches: 462
- Goals: 1,209 (2.62 per match)
- Highest attendance: 1,058 – Worthing – Bognor Regis Town, (28 December)
- Total attendance: 93,147
- Average attendance: 202 (-34.6% to previous season)

Division One consisted of 22 clubs, including 16 clubs from the previous season and six new clubs:

Two clubs relegated from the Premier Division:

- Hitchin Town
- Oxford City
- Yeading

Three clubs promoted from Division Two:

- Braintree Town
- Canvey Island
- Wealdstone

Canvey Island won the division to get a second consecutive promotion. Hitchin Town finished second and returned to the Premier Division at the first attempt, while Wealdtone, finished third, were refused promotion due to ground grading. Molesey, Wembley and Berkhamsted Town relegated to Division Two.

=== League table ===
Pos	Team	Pld	W	D	L	GF	GA	GD	Pts	Promotion or relegation
1	Canvey Island	42	28	6	8	76	41	+35	90	Promoted to the Premier Division
2	Hitchin Town	42	25	10	7	75	38	+37	85	Promoted to the Premier Division
3	Wealdstone	42	26	6	10	75	48	+27	84	
4	Braintree Town	42	20	10	12	75	48	+27	70	
5	Bognor Regis Town	42	20	8	14	63	44	+19	68	
6	Grays Athletic	42	19	11	12	56	42	+14	68	
7	Oxford City	42	16	14	12	58	51	+7	62	
8	Croydon	42	16	13	13	53	53	0	61	
9	Chertsey Town	42	14	16	12	57	57	0	58	
10	Romford	42	14	15	13	58	63	−5	57	
11	Maidenhead United	42	13	15	14	50	46	+4	54	
12	Worthing	42	13	13	16	47	61	−14	52	
13	Leyton Pennant	42	13	12	17	62	70	−8	51	
14	Uxbridge	42	13	11	18	54	51	+3	50	
15	Barton Rovers	42	11	15	16	43	49	−6	48	
16	Yeading	42	12	10	20	51	55	−4	46	
17	Leatherhead	42	12	9	21	48	59	−11	45	
18	Whyteleafe	42	13	6	23	51	72	−21	45	
19	Staines Town	42	10	15	17	33	57	−24	45	
20	Molesey	42	8	20	14	35	52	−17	44	Relegated to Division Two
21	Wembley	42	10	10	22	36	71	−35	40	Relegated to Division Two
22	Berkhamsted Town	42	10	7	25	53	81	−28	37	Relegated to Division Two

Source: fchd.com rsssf.com
Rules for classification: 1) points; 2) goal difference; 3) number of goals scored.

=== Stadia and locations ===
Locations of the Division One clubs
Greater London Division One football clubs

Club	Stadium
Barton Rovers	Sharpenhoe Road
Berkhamsted Town	Broadwater
Bognor Regis Town	Nyewood Lane
Braintree Town	Cressing Road
Canvey Island	Brockwell Stadium
Chertsey Town	Alwyns Lane
Croydon	Croydon Sports Arena
Grays Athletic	New Recreation Ground
Hitchin Town	Top Field
Leatherhead	Fetcham Grove
Leyton Pennant	Wadham Lodge
Maidenhead United	York Road
Molesey	Walton Road Stadium
Oxford City	Marsh Lane
Romford	Sungate
Staines Town	Wheatsheaf Park
Uxbridge	Honeycroft
Wealdstone	White Lion (groundshare with Edgware Town)
Wembley	Vale Farm
Whyteleafe	Church Road
Worthing	Woodside Road
Yeading	The Warren

== Division Two ==
Isthmian League Division Two
- Season: 1998–99
- Champions: Bedford Town
- Promoted: Bedford Town; Harlow Town; Thame United
- Relegated: Abingdon Town; Bracknell Town; Hertford Town
- Matches: 462
- Goals: 1,495 (3.24 per match)
- Highest attendance: 806 – Bedford Town – Leighton Town, (28 December)
- Total attendance: 60,932
- Average attendance: 132 (-21.9% to previous season)

Division Two consisted of 22 clubs, including 16 clubs from the previous season and six new clubs:

Three clubs relegated from Division One:

- Abingdon Town
- Thame United
- Wokingham Town

Three clubs promoted from Division Three:

- Harlow Town
- Hemel Hempstead
- Hertford Town

Bedford Town won the division and were promoted to Division One along with Harlow Town, who achieved a second consecutive promotion and Thame United, who returned to Division One after the relegation. Hertford Town relegated back to Division Three along with Bracknell Town and Abingdon Town, who get a second consecutive relegation.

=== League table ===
Pos	Team	Pld	W	D	L	GF	GA	GD	Pts	Promotion or relegation
1	Bedford Town	42	29	7	6	89	31	+58	94	Promoted to the Division One
2	Harlow Town	42	27	8	7	100	47	+53	89	Promoted to the Division One
3	Thame United	42	26	8	8	89	50	+39	86	Promoted to the Division One
4	Hemel Hempstead	42	21	12	9	90	50	+40	75	
5	Windsor & Eton	42	22	6	14	84	55	+29	72	
6	Banstead Athletic	42	21	8	13	83	62	+21	71	
7	Northwood	42	20	7	15	67	68	−1	67	
8	Tooting & Mitcham United	42	19	9	14	63	62	+1	66	
9	Chalfont St Peter	42	16	12	14	70	71	−1	60	
10	Metropolitan Police	42	17	8	17	61	58	+3	59	
11	Leighton Town	42	16	10	16	60	64	−4	58	
12	Horsham	42	17	6	19	74	67	+7	57	
13	Marlow	42	16	9	17	72	68	+4	57	
14	Edgware Town	42	14	10	18	65	68	−3	52	
15	Witham Town	42	12	15	15	64	64	0	51	
16	Hungerford Town	42	13	12	17	59	61	−2	51	
17	Wivenhoe Town	42	14	8	20	71	83	−12	50	
18	Wokingham Town	42	14	4	24	44	79	−35	46	
19	Barking	42	10	11	21	50	75	−25	41	
20	Hertford Town	42	11	2	29	44	96	−52	35	Relegated to Division Three
21	Bracknell Town	42	7	10	25	48	92	−44	31	Relegated to Division Three
22	Abingdon Town	42	6	6	30	48	124	−76	24	Relegated to Division Three

Source: fchd.com rsssf.com
Rules for classification: 1) points; 2) goal difference; 3) number of goals scored.

=== Stadia and locations ===
Locations of the Division Two clubs
Greater London Division Two football clubs

Club	Stadium
Abingdon Town	Culham Road
Banstead Athletic	Merland Rise
Barking	Mayesbrook Park
Bedford Town	The Eyrie
Bracknell Town	Larges Lane
Chalfont St Peter	Mill Meadow
Edgware Town	White Lion
Harlow Town	Harlow Sportcentre
Hemel Hempstead Town	Vauxhall Road
Hertford Town	Hertingfordbury Park
Horsham	Queen Street
Hungerford Town	Bulpit Lane
Leighton Town	Bell Close
Marlow	Alfred Davis Memorial Ground
Metropolitan Police	Imber Court
Northwood	Chestnut Avenue
Thame United	Windmill Road
Tooting & Mitcham United	Imperial Fields
Windsor & Eton	Stag Meadow
Witham Town	Spa Road
Wivenhoe Town	Broad Lane
Wokingham Town	Cantley Park

== Division Three ==
Isthmian League Division Three
- Season: 1998–99
- Champions: Ford United
- Promoted: Cheshunt; Ford United; Wingate & Finchley
- Matches: 380
- Goals: 1,319 (3.47 per match)
- Highest attendance: 380 – Wingate & Finchley – Cheshunt, (10 April)
- Total attendance: 28,737
- Average attendance: 76 (-1.3% to previous season)

Division Three consisted of 20 clubs, including 17 clubs from the previous season and three new clubs:

Three clubs relegated from Division Two:

- Cheshunt
- Egham Town
- Tilbury

Ford United won the division and were promoted along with Wingate & Finchley and Cheshunt, who returned straight after the relegation from Division Two.

=== League table ===
Pos	Team	Pld	W	D	L	GF	GA	GD	Pts	Promotion or relegation
1	Ford United	38	27	5	6	110	42	+68	86	Promoted to Division Two
2	Wingate & Finchley	38	25	5	8	79	38	+41	80	Promoted to Division Two
3	Cheshunt	38	23	10	5	70	41	+29	79	Promoted to Division Two
4	Lewes	38	25	3	10	86	45	+41	78	
5	Epsom & Ewell	38	19	5	14	61	51	+10	62	
6	Ware	38	19	4	15	79	60	+19	61	
7	Tilbury	38	17	8	13	74	52	+22	59	
8	Croydon Athletic	38	16	10	12	82	59	+23	58	
9	East Thurrock United	38	15	13	10	74	56	+18	58	
10	Egham Town	38	16	8	14	65	58	+7	56	
11	Corinthian-Casuals	38	16	7	15	70	71	−1	55	
12	Southall	38	14	9	15	68	66	+2	51	
13	Camberley Town	38	14	8	16	66	77	−11	50	
14	Aveley	38	12	7	19	50	67	−17	43	
15	Flackwell Heath	38	11	9	18	59	70	−11	42	
16	Hornchurch	38	10	9	19	48	73	−25	39	
17	Clapton	38	11	6	21	48	89	−41	39	
18	Dorking	38	8	7	23	52	98	−46	31	
19	Kingsbury Town	38	6	3	29	40	98	−58	21	
20	Tring Town	38	5	6	27	38	108	−70	21	

Source: fchd.com rsssf.com
Rules for classification: 1) points; 2) goal difference; 3) number of goals scored.

=== Stadia and locations ===
Locations of the Division Three clubs
Greater London Division Three football clubs

Club	Stadium
Aveley	The Mill Field
Camberley Town	Kroomer Park
Cheshunt	Cheshunt Stadium
Clapton	The Old Spotted Dog Ground
Corinthian-Casuals	King George's Field
Croydon Athletic	Keith Tuckey Stadium
Dorking	Meadowbank Stadium
East Thurrock United	Rookery Hill
Egham Town	The Runnymede Stadium
Epsom & Ewell	Merland Rise (groundshare with Banstead Athletic)
Flackwell Heath	Wilks Park
Ford United	Oakside
Hornchurch	Hornchurch Stadium
Kingsbury Town	Avenue Park
Lewes	The Dripping Pan
Southall	Robert Parker Stadium
Tilbury	Chadfields
Tring Town	Pendley Ground
Ware	Wodson Park
Wingate & Finchley	The Harry Abrahams Stadium

== Cup Competitions ==
The results from the finals of the league's three cup competitions:

Ryman League Cup: The league's premier cup competition, with clubs from all four divisions competing.

- Aldershot Town 2–1 Boreham Wood (played at Southampton F.C.)

Puma Full Members Cup: Featuring teams from the top two divisions.

- Hendon 1-0 Worthing (played at Sutton United)

Vandanel Trophy: Featuring teams from the bottom two divisions.

- Leighton Town 1-0 Windsor & Eton (played at Chesham United)

== See also ==
- Isthmian League
- 1998–99 Northern Premier League
- 1998–99 Southern Football League
