= Glenn Pennyfather =

English footballer and manager

Personal information
- Full name: Glenn Julian Pennyfather
- Date of birth: 11 February 1963 (age 63)
- Place of birth: Billericay, England
- Height: 5 ft 8 in (1.73 m)
- Positions: Defender; midfielder

Senior career*
Years	Team	Apps	(Gls)
1981–1987	Southend United	238	(36)
1987–1989	Crystal Palace	34	(1)
1989–1993	Ipswich Town	15	(1)
1992–1994	Bristol City	26	(1)
- Stevenage Borough
Total		313	(39)

Managerial career
- 2006–2009: Chelmsford City (assistant)
- 2009–2013: Chelmsford City
- * Club domestic league appearances and goals

Glenn Julian Pennyfather (born 11 February 1963) is an English retired footballer who played as a defender or midfielder. He made 315 appearances in the Football League for Southend United, Crystal Palace. Ipswich Town and Bristol City before moving into non-league football with Stevenage Borough and Canvey Island.

He is a former manager of Chelmsford City, becoming manager after being coach of the club, when he worked alongside long-time friend Jeff King after the pair had joined from a similar arrangement at Canvey Island.

He left the club on 7 May 2013, after a decision was made to not renew his contract. His departure followed Chelmsford's Conference South playoff semi-final defeat to Salisbury City just days before.

Pennyfather is often a summariser for BBC Essex's local football commentaries.
