= Godfrey Obebo =

Nigerian footballer

Personal information
- Date of birth: 16 April 1966 (age 60)
- Place of birth: Lagos, Nigeria
- Position: Forward

Senior career*
Years	Team	Apps	(Gls)
- Collier Row
1993	Halifax Town	3	(0)
- Leyton
- Grays Athletic
- * Club domestic league appearances and goals

Godfrey Obebo (born 1 April 1966) is a Nigerian former footballer who played in the English Football League for Halifax Town. He gained extensive experience on the non-League circuit in the Greater London area, and underwent several trials with professional clubs.

== Club career ==
Obebo was born in Lagos. He emigrated to the United Kingdom in October 1986 and trialled with Port Vale. Further unsuccessful trials ensued, including with Birmingham City (March 1993), Bristol City (November 1993), and Cambridge United (August 1994).

In March 1993, Obebo joined Halifax Town, who were at the bottom of the Football League Third Division, under the guise of being a former Nigeria international who had played in Serie A. Despite these claims about his past, manager Mick Rathbone would later describe Obebo as "hopeless". He made three substitute appearances but was unable to prevent the club's relegation.

When Rathbone asked substitute Obebo to "warm up" during an away game at Doncaster Rovers, he misunderstood and went back to the changing rooms to sit beside a radiator.

In 1995–96 Obebo was playing for Grays Athletic. In March 1998 he was awaiting clearance to sign for League of Wales club Porthmadog, having also been attached to Kingstonian during that campaign.

In 2015 Obebo was serving as the assistant coach of Tower Hamlets FC. In 2022 he was a vice president of Clapton FC.
