= Chris Duffy (footballer, born 1973) =

English footballer

Personal information
- Full name: Christopher John Duffy
- Date of birth: 31 October 1973 (age 53)
- Place of birth: Eccles, England
- Positions: Defender; midfielder

Youth career
- Manchester City
- Crewe Alexandra

Senior career*
Years	Team	Apps	(Gls)
1992–1993	Crewe Alexandra	0	(0)
1992	→ Mossley (loan)	9	(1)
1993–1994	Wigan Athletic	31	(1)
1994–1999	Northwich Victoria		
1999–2006	Canvey Island		
2006	Salisbury City		
2006–2009	Chelmsford City		
2009–2010	East Thurrock United		

International career
2003	England C		
- * Club domestic league appearances and goals

Christopher John Duffy (born 31 October 1973) is an English former footballer who played as a defender and a midfielder.

== Career ==
Initially playing in the youth set-up at both Manchester City and Crewe Alexandra, Duffy signed professional terms with Crewe in 1992. Whilst at Crewe, Duffy joined Mossley for a nine-game loan spell in the 1991–1992 season.

In 1993, Duffy signed for Wigan Athletic, making 31 Football League appearances at the club, scoring once. In 1994, Duffy signed for Northwich Victoria, playing for the club for five seasons, before signing for Canvey Island in July 1999 for a record transfer fee of £5,000. In 2006, Duffy briefly signed for Salisbury City, before joining former Canvey Island manager Jeff King at Chelmsford City, following King's takeover of the club. In July 2009, Duffy signed for East Thurrock United.

After retiring from football in 2010, Duffy took up a physiotherapist role at Chelmsford City.
