= 1996–97 Essex Senior Football League =

The 1996–97 season was the 26th in the history of Essex Senior Football League a football competition in England.

The league featured 13 clubs which competed in the league last season, along with two new clubs:

- Ilford, returned to the league system after leaving the Spartan League in 1994
- Saffron Walden Town, resigned from the Isthmian League

Ford United were champions, winning their second Essex Senior League title and were promoted to the Isthmian League.

== League table ==
Essex Senior Football League
- Season: 1996–97
- Champions: Ford United
- Promoted: Ford United
- Matches: 210
- Goals: 707 (3.37 per match)

Pos	Team	Pld	W	D	L	GF	GA	GD	Pts	Promotion or relegation
1	Ford United	28	21	6	1	91	24	+67	69	Promoted to the Isthmian League
2	Great Wakering Rovers	28	20	6	2	67	19	+48	66	
3	Concord Rangers	28	19	5	4	99	31	+68	62	
4	Stansted	28	19	2	7	53	37	+16	59	
5	Burnham Ramblers	28	13	7	8	62	39	+23	46	
6	Brentwood	28	11	10	7	46	34	+12	43	
7	Hullbridge Sports	28	13	4	11	52	42	+10	43	
8	Basildon United	28	11	5	12	39	52	−13	37 (Note: Basildon United were deducted one point.)	
9	Ilford	28	10	4	14	35	40	−5	34	
10	Saffron Walden Town	28	8	8	12	40	39	+1	32	
11	Southend Manor	28	8	5	15	32	42	−10	29	
12	Bowers United	28	8	4	16	32	77	−45	28	
13	East Ham United	28	7	3	18	29	54	−25	24	
14	Sawbridgeworth Town	28	3	3	22	17	69	−52	12	
15	Eton Manor	28	1	4	23	13	108	−95	7	

Source: fchd
Rules for classification: 1) points; 2) goal difference; 3) number of goals scored.
