= 1996–97 Combined Counties Football League =

The 1996–97 Combined Counties Football League season was the 19th in the history of the Combined Counties Football League, a football competition in England.

The league was won by Ashford Town (Middlesex) for the third time in succession.

== League table ==
Combined Counties Football League
- Season: 1996–97
- Champions: Ashford Town
- Promoted: Corinthian-Casuals
- Matches: 380
- Goals: 1,268 (3.34 per match)

The league was reduced from 22 clubs to 20 after D.C.A. Basingstoke, Eton Wick and Peppard joined the Chiltonian League, and Horley Town joined the Crawley and District League. Two new clubs joined:

- Corinthian-Casuals, transferred from the Spartan League
- Cove, resigned from the Isthmian League

Pos	Team	Pld	W	D	L	GF	GA	GD	Pts	Promotion or relegation
1	Ashford Town	38	27	6	5	107	39	+68	87	
2	Corinthian-Casuals	38	25	8	5	86	36	+50	83	Promoted to the Isthmian League Division Three
3	Bedfont	38	23	4	11	94	56	+38	73	
4	Feltham	38	21	3	14	88	67	+21	66	
5	Farnham Town	38	19	7	12	80	42	+38	64	
6	Reading Town	38	17	13	8	62	60	+2	64	
7	Chipstead	38	18	8	12	67	55	+12	62	
8	Sandhurst Town	38	17	10	11	61	63	−2	61	
9	Godalming & Guildford	38	17	8	13	69	47	+22	59	
10	Netherne	38	14	6	18	55	62	−7	48	
11	Viking Sports	38	14	6	18	59	67	−8	48	
12	Hartley Wintney	38	12	11	15	65	78	−13	47	
13	Cove	38	12	11	15	43	59	−16	47	
14	Cobham	38	11	9	18	62	72	−10	42	
15	Westfield	38	10	12	16	34	46	−12	42	
16	Ash United	38	10	8	20	45	64	−19	38	
17	Raynes Park Vale	38	10	6	22	53	90	−37	36	
18	Cranleigh	38	9	6	23	52	88	−36	33	
19	Merstham	38	9	6	23	39	87	−48	33	
20	Walton Casuals	38	9	4	25	47	90	−43	31	

Source: nonleaguematters
Rules for classification: 1) points; 2) goal difference; 3) number of goals scored.
