= 1998–99 Essex Senior Football League =

The 1998–99 season was the 28th in the history of Essex Senior Football League a football competition in England.

The league featured 14 clubs which competed in the league last season, no new clubs joined the league this season.

Bowers United were champions, winning their second Essex Senior League title, while Great Wakering Rovers were promoted to the Isthmian League.

== League table ==
Essex Senior Football League
- Season: 1998–99
- Champions: Bowers United
- Promoted: Great Wakering Rovers
- Matches: 182
- Goals: 642 (3.53 per match)
- Top goalscorer: David Hope (45 goals)

Pos	Team	Pld	W	D	L	GF	GA	GD	Pts	Promotion or relegation
1	Bowers United	26	21	3	2	82	15	+67	66	
2	Great Wakering Rovers	26	20	2	4	73	26	+47	62	Promoted to the Isthmian League
3	Saffron Walden Town	26	16	8	2	49	20	+29	56	
4	Burnham Ramblers	26	14	6	6	61	25	+36	48	
5	Basildon United	26	13	5	8	46	36	+10	44	
6	Southend Manor	26	11	9	6	49	40	+9	42	
7	Ilford	26	13	3	10	49	44	+5	42	
8	Hullbridge Sports	26	8	3	15	41	42	−1	27	
9	Concord Rangers	26	8	7	11	34	48	−14	27 (Note: Concord Rangers were deducted four points.)	
10	Brentwood	26	5	6	15	30	60	−30	21	
11	Stansted	26	6	3	17	40	88	−48	21	
12	East Ham United	26	5	5	16	33	88	−55	20	
13	Sawbridgeworth Town	26	4	6	16	19	47	−28	18	
14	Eton Manor	26	3	4	19	36	63	−27	13	

Source: fchd
Rules for classification: 1) points; 2) goal difference; 3) number of goals scored.
