= 2000–01 Combined Counties Football League =

The 2000–01 Combined Counties Football League season was the 23rd in the history of the Combined Counties Football League, a football competition in England.

== League table ==
Combined Counties Football League
- Season: 2000–01
- Champions: Cove
- Matches: 419
- Goals: 1,629 (3.89 per match)

The league featured 20 clubs from the previous season, along with one new club:

- Southall, relegated from the Isthmian League

Pos	Team	Pld	W	D	L	GF	GA	GD	Pts
1	Cove	40	35	2	3	146	28	+118	107
2	AFC Wallingford	40	30	6	4	129	39	+90	96
3	Ash United	40	28	4	8	121	53	+68	88
4	Bedfont	40	24	4	12	96	64	+32	76
5	Chipstead	40	23	5	12	92	48	+44	74
6	Westfield	40	19	6	15	66	56	+10	63
7	Walton Casuals	40	19	5	16	73	68	+5	62
8	Merstham	40	16	9	15	86	64	+22	59 (Note: Merstham were awarded two points.)
9	Feltham	40	17	7	16	74	75	−1	58
10	Chessington & Hook United	40	15	7	18	83	92	−9	58 (Note: Chessington & Hook United were awarded six points.)
11	Southall	40	17	8	15	84	70	+14	56 (Note: Southall were deducted three points.)
12	Godalming & Guildford	40	15	10	15	73	80	−7	55
13	Sandhurst Town	39	17	6	16	75	61	+14	54 (Note: Sandhurst Town were deducted three points.)
14	Cobham	40	16	6	18	69	72	−3	54
15	Chessington United	40	14	13	13	67	57	+10	51 (Note: Chessington United were deducted four points.)
16	Raynes Park Vale	40	15	5	20	63	78	−15	50
17	Hartley Wintney	40	12	4	24	73	99	−26	40
18	Viking Greenford	40	8	8	24	58	102	−44	32
19	Reading Town	40	6	9	25	43	97	−54	30 (Note: Reading Town were awarded three points.)
20	Farnham Town	39	4	3	32	30	145	−115	15 (Note: Farnham Town - Sandhurst Town was abandoned with Sandhurst leading 1-0. The game was never replayed and no points were awarded.)
21	Cranleigh	40	4	3	33	28	181	−153	15

Source: nonleaguematters
Rules for classification: 1) points; 2) goal difference; 3) number of goals scored.
