= Jeff King (football manager) =

English financier and association football manager (born 1959)

Personal information
- Full name: Jeffrey Gregory King
- Date of birth: May 1959 (age 67)
- Position: Defender

Senior career*
Years	Team	Apps	(Gls)
- Canvey Island

Managerial career
- 1992–2006: Canvey Island
- 2006–2009: Chelmsford City
- * Club domestic league appearances and goals

Jeffrey Gregory King (born May 1959) is an English financier and association football manager.

== Life and career ==
King, a former Canvey Island player, took over ownership at Canvey in 1992 and both managed and funded the club's progress through the divisions between 1992 and 2006, where he left them in the Football Conference.

In 2006, King announced that he was terminating his association with Canvey and instead took over at Isthmian League Premier Division club Chelmsford City. During his time at Chelmsford, King managed them to the 2007–08 Isthmian League Premier Division title. He then reached the Conference South play-off semi-final in the following season.

In May 2009, King took on a new role at Chelmsford City as director of football, with his assistant Glenn Pennyfather taking control of first team affairs. He was also given a role on club's board of directors, with Pennyfather reporting directly to King.
