= Canvey Island F.C. =

Association football club in England

Coordinates: 51°30′59″N 0°36′56″E

Canvey Island
- Full name: Canvey Island Football Club
- Nicknames: The Gulls, The Islanders, Yellows
- Founded: 1926
- Ground: Park Lane, Canvey Island
- Capacity: 4,100 (500 seated)
- Chairman: John Batch
- Manager: Kevin Horlock
- League: Isthmian League North Division
- 2025–26: Isthmian League Premier Division, 22nd of 22 (relegated)
- Website: canveyislandfc.com
Home colours	Away colours

Canvey Island Football Club is a football club based in Canvey Island, Essex, England. They are currently members of the Isthmian League North Division and play at Park Lane.

== History ==
The club was established in 1926 and initially played in the Southend & District League. They later joined the Thurrock Combination, winning the League Cup in 1952–53 and the league and League Cup double in 1955–56. In 1957 the club joined the Parthenon League, finishing bottom of the league in their first season. The following season saw them finish sixth and win the League Cup, and in 1959–60 they were league runners-up. In 1963 they switched to the London League, joining the reformed Division One. In 1964 the league merged with the Aetolian League to form the Greater London League, with the club placed in the A division. In 1967–68 they were Division One champions and won the League Cup, retaining both titles the following season.

In 1971 the Greater London League merged with the Metropolitan League to form the Metropolitan–London League, with Canvey Island placed in Division One. When the league merged with the Spartan League in 1975 they joined the Essex Senior League. They were runners-up in 1978–79 and won the League Cup the following season. They won the league for the first time in 1986–87. After winning the league and League Cup again under Jeff King in 1992–93, a season which also saw the club reach the semi-finals of the FA Vase, they moved up to Division Three of the Isthmian League in 1994. Their first season in Division Three saw them finish as runners-up, earning promotion to Division Two. The club went on to win Division Two the following season, resulting in promotion to Division One. They also reached the first round of the FA Cup for the first time, eventually losing 4–1 to Brighton in a replay.

Although Canvey Island were relegated back to Division Two at the end of the 1996–97 season, they were Division Two champions in 1997–98 and Division One champions in 1998–99 as successive promotions saw them reach the league's Premier Division. In 2000–01 they finished as league runners-up, and also reached the second round of the FA Cup; the first round saw them beat Second Division Port Vale 2–1 in a replay at Vale Park after a 4–4 draw at Park Lane. In the second round the club were drawn at home to near-neighbours Third Division Southend United; in a game switched to Southend's Roots Hall, they lost 2–1. However, the club's biggest success came in the FA Trophy, where they reached the final at Villa Park after beating three teams from the Football Conference. In the final the club beat favourites Forest Green Rovers 1–0, becoming the first team from the Isthmian League to win the competition for 20 years. The following season saw them finish as Premier Division runners-up again, as well as reaching the third round of the FA Cup. After winning 1–0 against Football League clubs Wigan Athletic and Northampton Town in both the first and second round, they lost 4–1 at Burnley in the third round.

In 2002–03 Canvey Island finished as Premier Division runners-up for a third consecutive season, but the following year saw them win the division to earn promotion to the Conference National. The season had also seen them reach the FA Cup first round for a third time; again drawn to face Southend, they lost 3–2 in a replay at Park Lane after a 1–1 draw at Roots Hall and the FA Trophy final, where they lost 3–2 to Hednesford Town. Another first round appearance in 2004–05 ended in a 4–0 defeat to Aldershot Town. After two seasons at the fifth level, King decided the poor attendances did not justify continued investment in the club and they took voluntary demotion to Division One North of the Isthmian League. In 2007–08 they finished fifth in the division, qualifying for the promotion play-offs. After defeating AFC Sudbury 3–2 in the semi-finals, they beat Redbridge 5–4 on penalties in the final after the match had ended 1–1 and were promoted back to the Premier Division.

Canvey Island were relegated back to the (renamed) North Division at the end of the 2016–17 season after finishing third-from-bottom of the Premier Division. The following season saw them finish sixth in the North Division, qualifying for the play-offs. After beating Bowers & Pitsea 2–0 in the semi-finals, they lost 3–1 to Haringey Borough in the final. In 2020–21 the club reached the first round of the FA Cup again, winning 2–1 at Banbury United, before losing 3–0 to Boreham Wood in the second round. The 2021–22 season saw the club finish as runners-up in the North Division, going on to beat Felixstowe & Walton United 3–1 in the play-off semi-finals before winning the final against Brentwood Town 4–1 on penalties, earning promotion to the Premier Division. The club finished third in the Premier Division the following season before being beaten by Aveley in the play-off semi-finals. In 2025–26 they finished bottom of the Premier Division and were relegated back to the North Division.

== Ground ==
Upon formation, the club played at The Paddocks on Long Road on the island, before moving to Furtherwick School. Following World War II, Canvey Island returned to The Paddocks. In 1955, the club moved a short distance to Poplar Road. Whilst in the Parthenon League, the club moved to Park Lane in 1962. It currently has a capacity of 4,100, of which 500 is seated and 827 covered. In the summer of 2018, it was announced that the club would also be hosting the home matches of Benfleet.

== Honours ==
- FA Trophy
  - Winners 2000–01
- Isthmian League
  - Premier Division champions 2003–04
  - Division One champions 1998–99
  - Division Two champions 1995–96, 1997–98
- Greater London League
  - Division One champions 1967–68, 1968–69
  - League Cup winners 1967–68, 1968–69
- Parthenon League
  - League Cup winners 1958–59
- Essex Senior League
  - Champions 1986–87, 1992–93
  - League Cup winners 1979–80, 1992–93
  - Harry Fisher Memorial Trophy winners 1993–94
- Thurrock Combination
  - Champions 1955–56
  - League Cup winners 1952–53, 1955–56
- Essex Senior Cup
  - Winners 1998–99, 1999–2000, 2001–02, 2011–12, 2024–25

== Records ==
- Best FA Cup performance: Third round, 2001–02
- Best FA Trophy performance: Winners, 2000–01
- Best FA Vase performance: Semi-finals, 1992–93
- Record attendance: 3,553 vs Aldershot Town, Isthmian League, 2002–03
- Most appearances: Steve Ward
- Most goals: Andy Jones
- Record transfer fee received: £4,500 from Farnborough Town for Brian Horne
- Record transfer fee paid: £5,000 to Northwich Victoria for Chris Duffy

== See also ==
- Canvey Island F.C. players
- Canvey Island F.C. managers
