= Hertford Town F.C. =

Association football club in England

Coordinates: 51°47′30″N 0°05′18″W

Hertford Town
- Full name: Hertford Town Football Club
- Nickname: The Blues
- Founded: 1901
- Ground: Hertingfordbury Park, Hertford
- Capacity: 6,500 (200 seated)
- Chairman: Peter Maladay
- Manager: Ben Herd
- League: Southern League Division One Central
- 2025–26: Southern League Division One Central, 6th of 22
Home colours	Away colours

Hertford Town Football Club is a football club based in Hertford, Hertfordshire, England. They are currently members of the Southern League Division One Central and play at Hertingfordbury Park.

== History ==
The club was established in 1901 as Port Vale Rovers, but were soon renamed Hertford Football Club to gain recognition as the town's main club. Following a merger with Hertford United, the club was renamed Hertford Town. After absorbing two more clubs – Blue Cross and Horns – in 1908, the club joined the Eastern Division of the Hertfordshire Senior County League for the 1908–09 season, which saw them finish as runners-up.

League reorganisation in 1909 saw Hertford placed in the Central Division. They finished bottom of the division in its first season, before they were moved back into the Eastern Division in 1910. The club was also playing in the East Herts League, which they won in 1912–13. The following season saw the club retain the East Herts League title and finish second in the Eastern Division of the Hertfordshire Senior County League. After switching to the Middlesex League for the 1920–21 season, the club joined Division One of the Spartan League in 1921. Following league reorganisation in 1928, Hertford were placed in Division One East, with an eleventh-place finish seeing them moved to Division One the following season when a Premier Division was created.

In 1938–39 Hertford were Division One runners-up and promoted to the Premier Division. However, the following season was abandoned due to World War II and when the league restarted in 1945, Hertford were placed in the Central Division, finishing bottom of the table in the 1945–46 season. Despite their poor performance, the club were placed in the Premier Division the following season, but went on to finish bottom of the table again. The club lost the use of its ground in 1947 and left the league for a season before returning to the Spartan League in 1948, when they were placed in Division One East. After winning the division in 1949–50, they were promoted back to the Premier Division in 1950 and were runners-up in 1955–56 and 1956–57.

In 1959 Hertford transferred to the Delphian League and were runners-up in their first season. They went on to win back-to-back league titles in 1960–61 and 1961–62. The 1962–63 season was abandoned due to bad weather, but Hertford won both the League Cup and the Eastern Section of the emergency competition, going on to lose the title decider to Western Section Champions Edmonton 5–2 on aggregate. They also won the East Anglian Cup by beating Boston United 1–0 in the final, a match played at home in front of a 3,000 crowd. When the Delphian League was disbanded at the end of the season, Hertford joined the new Division Two of the Athenian League alongside most of the other former Delphian League clubs. A fourth-place finish in 1963–64 was enough to earn promotion to Division One at the first attempt and the club went on to win the league's Memorial Shield in 1967–68.

Hertford switched to the Eastern Counties League in 1972. They won the league cup and finished third in the league in their first season, but left to join the newly-formed Division Two of the Isthmian League. The division was renamed Division One in 1977, and the club were relegated to Division Two North after finishing bottom of the table in 1984–85. League restructuring in 1991 saw the club placed in Division Three. They were promoted to Division Two after finishing runners-up in 1998–99, but were relegated the following season. Further league restructuring saw Hertford placed in Division One North in 2002, but they finished bottom of the table in the division's inaugural season and were relegated to Division Two. After the division was disbanded in 2006, they joined the Premier Division of the Spartan South Midlands League. The club were Premier Division runners-up in 2016–17 and were promoted to Division One North of the Isthmian League after London Colney turned down promotion. At the end of the 2020–21 season, which was curtailed due to the COVID-19 pandemic, they were transferred to Division One Central of the Southern League.

== Ground ==
The club initially played at Hartham Park, but when Blue Cross were absorbed in 1908, they moved to Blue Cross' Hertingfordbury Park. A covered terrace was erected on one side of the pitch in 1950. Although it was extended the following year, when a covered terrace was also built at the car park end of the ground, it was later demolished. The 200-seat main stand was built in 1959, replacing an earlier stand that burnt down in 1946. Floodlights were installed in 1956 and upgraded in 1965. The ground currently has a capacity of 6,500, of which 200 is seated and 1,500 covered.

== Honours ==
- Spartan League
  - Division One Eastern Section champions 1949–50
- Athenian League
  - Memorial Shield winners 1967–68
- Delphian League
  - Champions 1960–61, 1961–62
  - Eastern Division champions 1962–63
  - League Cup winners 1962–63
- Eastern Counties League
  - League Cup winners 1972–73
- East Herts League
  - Champions 1912–13, 1913–14
- Herts Senior Cup
  - Winners 1966–67, 1989–90
- East Anglian Cup
  - Winners 1962–63, 1969–70
- Mithras Cup
  - Winners 1978–79
- Herts Charity Cup
  - Winners 1972–73
- Herts Charity Shield
  - Winners 1919–20,. 1920–21, 1935–36, 1949–50, 1959–60, 2014–15

== Records ==
- Best FA Cup performance: Fourth qualifying round, 1973–74
- Best FA Trophy performance: Second round, 1979–80
- Best FA Vase performance: Third round, 1986–87, 2003–04, 2012–13, 2015–16
- Record attendance: 5,000 vs Kingstonian, FA Amateur Cup second round, 1955–56
- Most appearances: Robbie Burns

== See also ==
- Hertford Town F.C. players
- Hertford Town F.C. managers
