= Cressing Road =

Football stadium in Braintree, Essex, England

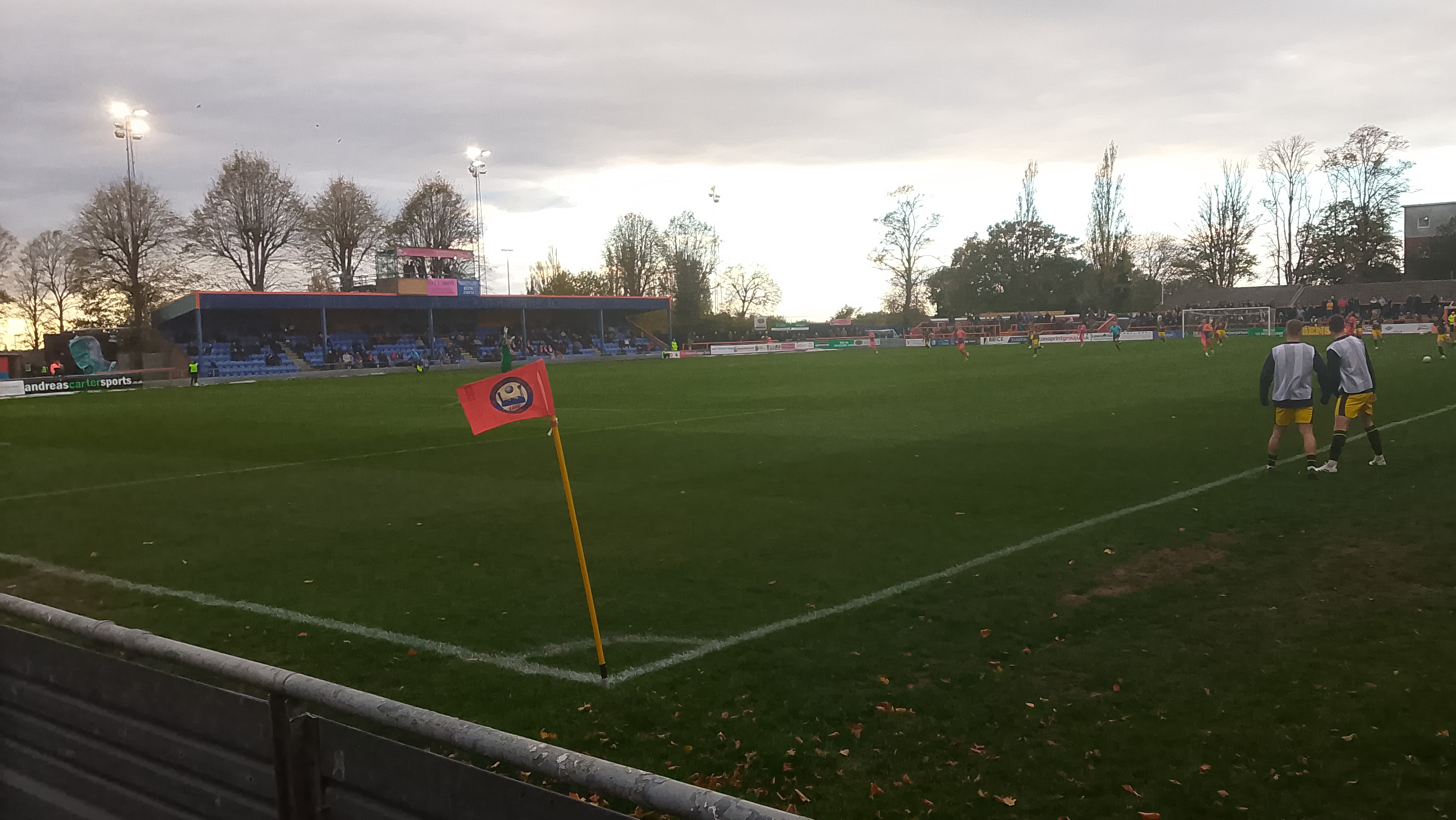
- Cressing Road pictured during a match in October 2025
- Interactive map of Cressing Road
- Location: Braintree, Essex, England
- Coordinates: 51°52′31″N 0°34′23″E
- Owner: L Harding 38.78%, K Cowell & Cowell & Cooper Limited 38.78%, V Dixon 10.33%.
- Capacity: 4,222 (553 seated)
- Surface: Grass
- Record attendance: 6,000 (football); 8,000 (non-football)

Construction
- Built: 1923
- Opened: 25th August 1923

Tenant
- Braintree Town

Cressing Road, also known as the Rare Breed Meat Co. Stadium for sponsorship purposes, is a football stadium in Braintree, Essex, and the home ground of Braintree Town, and formally their reserve side. It currently has a capacity of 4,222.

== History ==
The stadium was built as a general sports ground by the Crittall Windows Company, the parent company of the club, then known as Crittall Athletic. It was opened on 25 August 1923 by the fourth annual Crittall Sports and Show, which had previously taken place the club's old ground on Panfield Lane, with an attendance of 6,000. At the time the ground had a cinder track a quarter of a mile long.

The first football match was played on 15 September 1923, with Crittall beating Great Leighs 4–0. A 400-seat grandstand was opened in December 1924 and the ground became the regular venue for the Essex Junior Cup, with a record football crowd of 6,000 attending for the 1926 final between Rayleigh Athletic and Saffron Walden. This was equalled in the 1928 final between Leigh Ramblers and Wimpole Road Wesleyans and an Essex Senior Cup semi-final between Chelmsford and Colchester Town in 1931. A non-football record of 8,000 was set for the Crittall Sport and Show in 1926.

A second grandstand was opened during the 1932–33 season. A record attendance for the home club was set during the 1935–36 season when 4,000 watched an Essex Senior Cup match against Barking; this was equalled on 8 May 1952 when they played Tottenham Hotspur in a friendly, with Spurs winning 8–1. Floodlights were installed in 1967 and inaugurated with a friendly match against West Ham. Greyhound racing also began to be held at the ground in the same year.

In the mid-1970s the ground had fallen into a state of disrepair and the club was forced to play at other venues for a time due to problems with the pitch. Half of the main stand was removed in the early 1970s and in January 1974 the rest of the stand which was badly damaged in a storm. With the ground being in such poor condition the club had to play at alternative venues. These included Heybridge Swifts' Scraley Road (a single match on 26 April 1975 arranged at such short notice that many fans arrived at Cressing Road for the match and only 50 attended the game), Braintree Rugby Club's Tabor Avenue (at the start of the 1975–76 season) and the Courtaulds Sports Ground in Church Street in Bocking (a single match against Gorleston on 6 September 1975 with a crowd of 73). However, after winning the Eastern Counties League in 1983–84 the club began to upgrade the ground, building a new 292-seat grandstand at the end of the 1980s.

This stand was extended during the 2011–12 season to include 553 seats. New floodlighting and terracing was also installed at both ends of the ground in 2011–12. This allowed the ground grading to be improved to the FA 'A' grading required to allow the club to take part in the play-offs for promotion to the Football League in 2016.

== Current format ==
The ground currently consists of four stands:

- Main Stand, a 553-seat covered stand
- Clubhouse End, two uncovered terraces with a capacity of 1,131
- Quag End, with an uncovered terrace with a capacity of 1,408
- Cressing Road side, a 1,130-capacity terrace (of which 755 is covered)

== Greyhound racing ==
Greyhound racing took place around the pitch from 1967 until an unknown date. The racing was independent (not affiliated to the sports governing body the National Greyhound Racing Club). As a result, it was known as a flapping track, a nickname given to independent tracks.
