= Croydon F.C. =

Association football club in England

Coordinates: 51°23′36″N 0°3′38″W

Croydon
- Full name: Croydon Football Club
- Nickname: The Trams
- Founded: 1953 as Croydon Amateurs
- Ground: Croydon Arena; South Norwood, London
- Capacity: 8,000
- Chairman: Tony Blencowe and Liam Blencowe
- Managers: Alex White & Ryan Watts
- League: Southern Counties East League Division One
- 2025–26: Southern Counties East League Division One, 5th of 18
- Website: http://www.croydonfc.com/
Home colours	Away colours

Croydon Football Club is an English semi-professional football club based in Croydon, Greater London. Until 2006, they played in the Isthmian League, but lost their place in that league as part of the 2006 re-structuring of non-league football, and now play in the Southern Counties East League Division One. They play at Croydon Sports Arena in South Norwood. The club was founded in 1953 as Croydon Amateurs.

== History ==
The club was founded in 1953 as Croydon Amateurs FC and its original players came from some of the stronger clubs playing in local football. The club was specially formed to play at the Croydon Arena (still its home today) when it was officially opened in 1953. The team made its debut at the Arena against Malden Town on Saturday 5 September 1953, winning 4–3. The club spent their first ten years in the Surrey Senior League but whilst failing to win the championship (thrice finishing runners-up), evolved into one of that competition's strongest teams. In 1963–64, they joined the Spartan League, winning the league title at the first attempt in their only season in the competition. 1964 saw them join the Athenian League where they spent the next ten years, winning the Second Division title in 1965–66, suffering relegation four years later and then gaining two successive promotions to the Premier Division as runners-up to Herne Bay (1970–71) and Harlow Town (1971–72) under the managership of Jimmy Rose. Rose's departure to Dulwich Hamlet saw a mass player exodus and a season of struggle ensued. 1973 saw the suffix Amateurs dropped due to the impending changes to the status of players and a year later, under the management of Ted Shepherd, election to the expanding Isthmian League.

Two seasons later, after an unbeaten 1975–76 campaign, the club gained promotion to the Isthmian's top division – initially titled Division One but then retitled the Premier Division where they spent twelve seasons before relegation to the First Division in 1989. An FA Cup run in the 1979–80 season led to a home draw in the 2nd round to Football League opposition in the shape of Division Three Millwall. The tie was switched to be played at Selhurst Park and in front of almost 10,000 people the Croydon team, captained by Alec Jackson held their League opponents to a 1–1 draw thanks to a Rod Ward goal. The replay three days later could not separate the two sides after 90 minutes with Constable scoring twice for Croydon, but Millwall eventually winning the match narrowly 3–2 after extra time. A further relegation followed in 1994, but following Ken Jarvie taking over as Chairman / Manager and internal reorganisation, they were promoted back to Division One within two seasons. The club's first Isthmian League title – champions of Division One followed in 2000, before relegation two years later.

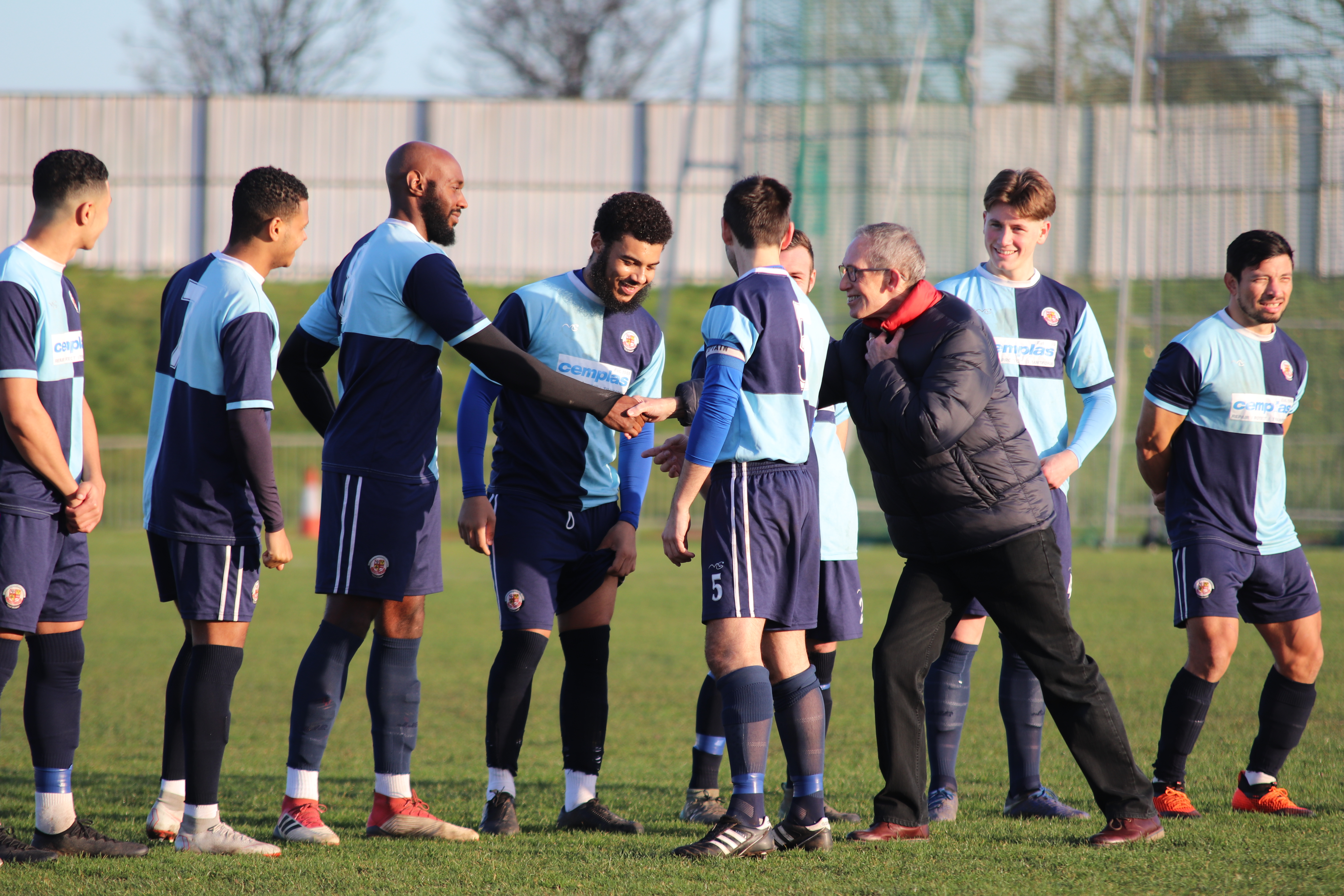
Alec Jackson, captain of the 1979-80 cup run team, meeting players of the 2019–20 squad

The non-league scene was reorganised at the end of the 2005–06 season and this restructuring saw them placed in the Kent League where following a third-place finish in 2006–07, the club finished in mid-table the following two seasons. 2008–09 culminated with success in the Kent League Cup after a penalty shootout win over Erith Town.

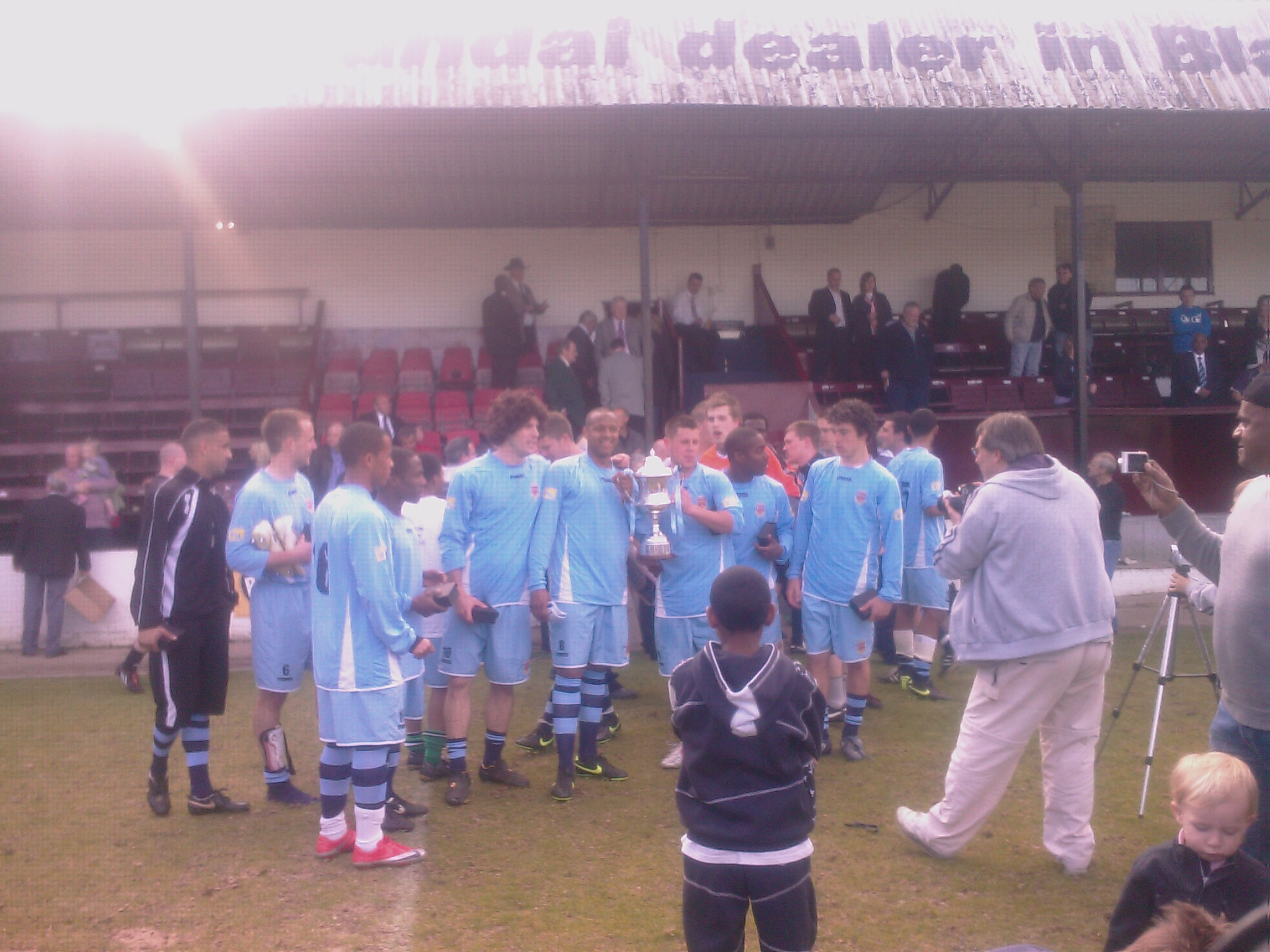
The Croydon team lifting the 2009 Kent League Cup.

That turned out to be the club's final Kent League fixture as they were shuffled sideways into the Combined Counties League (a competition which evolved from the Surrey Senior League) for the 2009–10 season. This was effectively back where they spent their first ten years and there is long-term rebuilding underway - the first three seasons in the CCFL saw them finish lower midway. For the 2014–15 season, the club was switched to the Southern Counties East League (formerly the Kent League).

The club also runs a successful youth programme, a midweek Under 18 team playing in Ryman Youth League, a second under 18 team playing in the new Combined Counties league and a Sunday team who play in the Croydon Municipal league. In their first season the Sunday side were promoted and won the Leonard Vase Cup (2012–13) Recent players to have graduated from the youth programme include Danny Mills, Lee Brown and Stefan Payne.

Croydon dropped down to Step 6 at the end of the 2018–19 season after finishing bottom of the SCEFL Premier Division with just 11 points all season. They have remained at that level since then, finishing 8th and 7th during the two pandemic-affected seasons. They came 8th in 2021–22, and then 10th in 2022–23.

Croydon fell short of promotion again in the 2023–24 season. The club overcame a slow start to get themselves into the play-off mix but four straight defeats at the end of the campaign saw them finish 8th with 44 points from 30 games. However, the club did end their 15-year trophy drought, beating Wimbledon Casuals 1–0 to win the 2023–24 London Senior Trophy.

== Nickname ==
The club's nickname "The Trams" was adopted around 2000 when the Tramlink system opened, running round the back of the ground, Arena being the closest stop less than two minutes walk from the turnstiles.

== Supporters ==
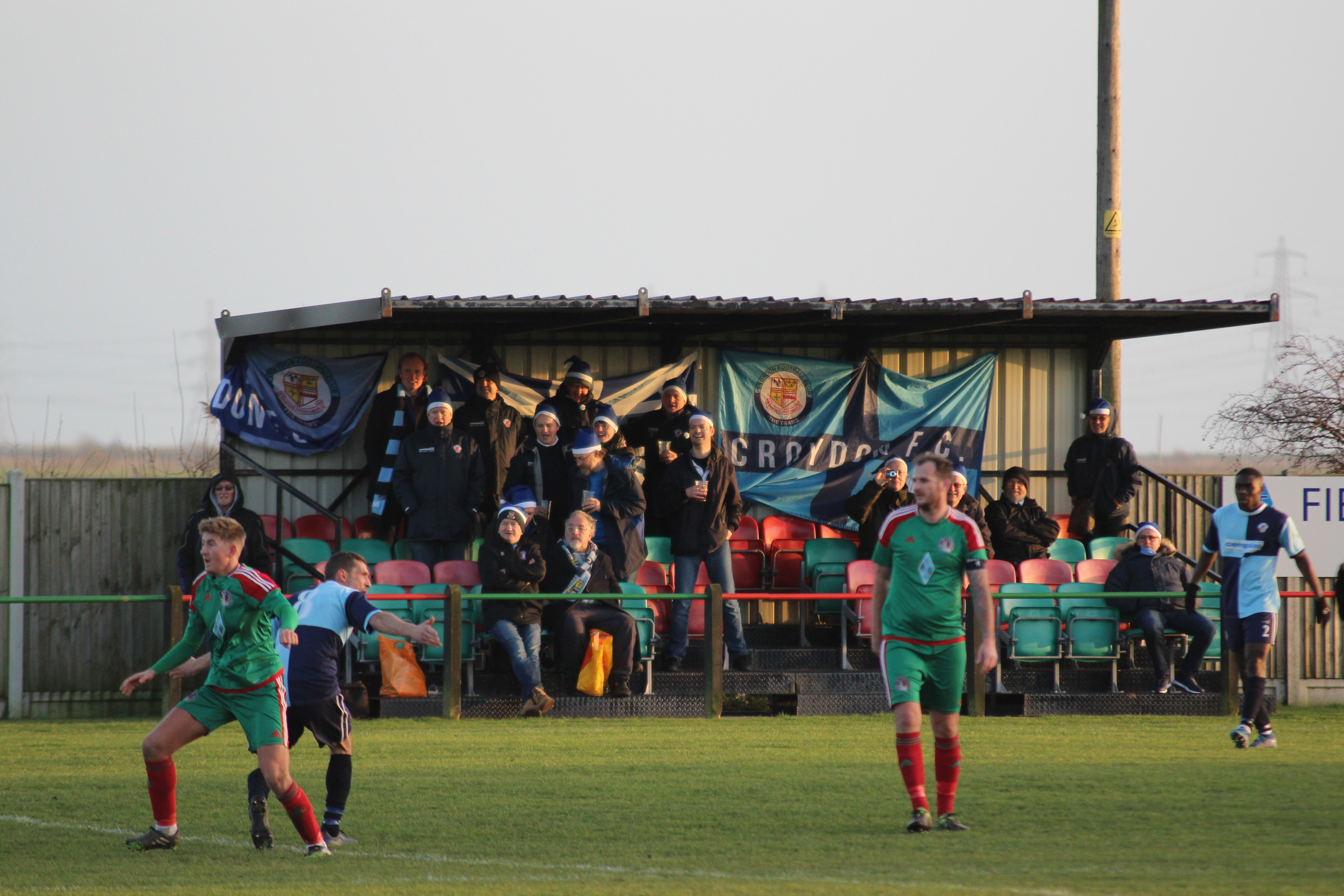
Croydon fans at Lydd Town

Croydon fans are collectively known as 'The Trams Barmy Army' and are referred to as the '12th man' by the club. They are known for their vocal support but friendly nature.

== Ground ==
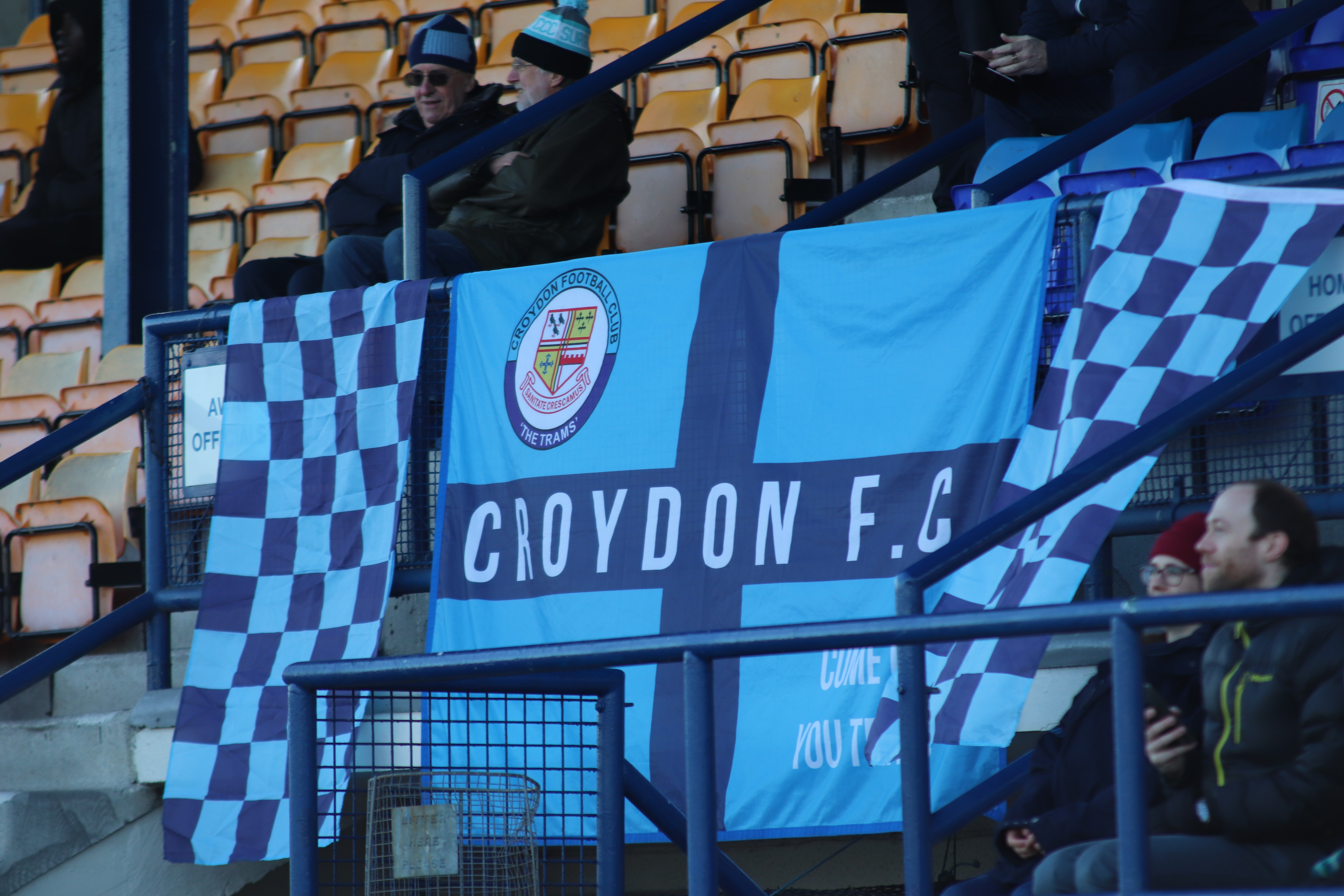
Croydon FC supporters flags in the main stand at Croydon Sports Arena

Croydon play at Croydon Sports Arena, Albert Road, South Norwood, SE25 4QL. The Croydon FC clubhouse overlooks Croydon Sports Arena and has a bar where supporters meet before and after games.

As of November 2020, the club had an enforced temporary switch of home ground to the Crystal Palace National Sports Centre which, in the event, lasted for one game. It has a capacity of 15,500, but can be and has been in the past expanded to 24,000 with temporary seating.

== Club honours ==
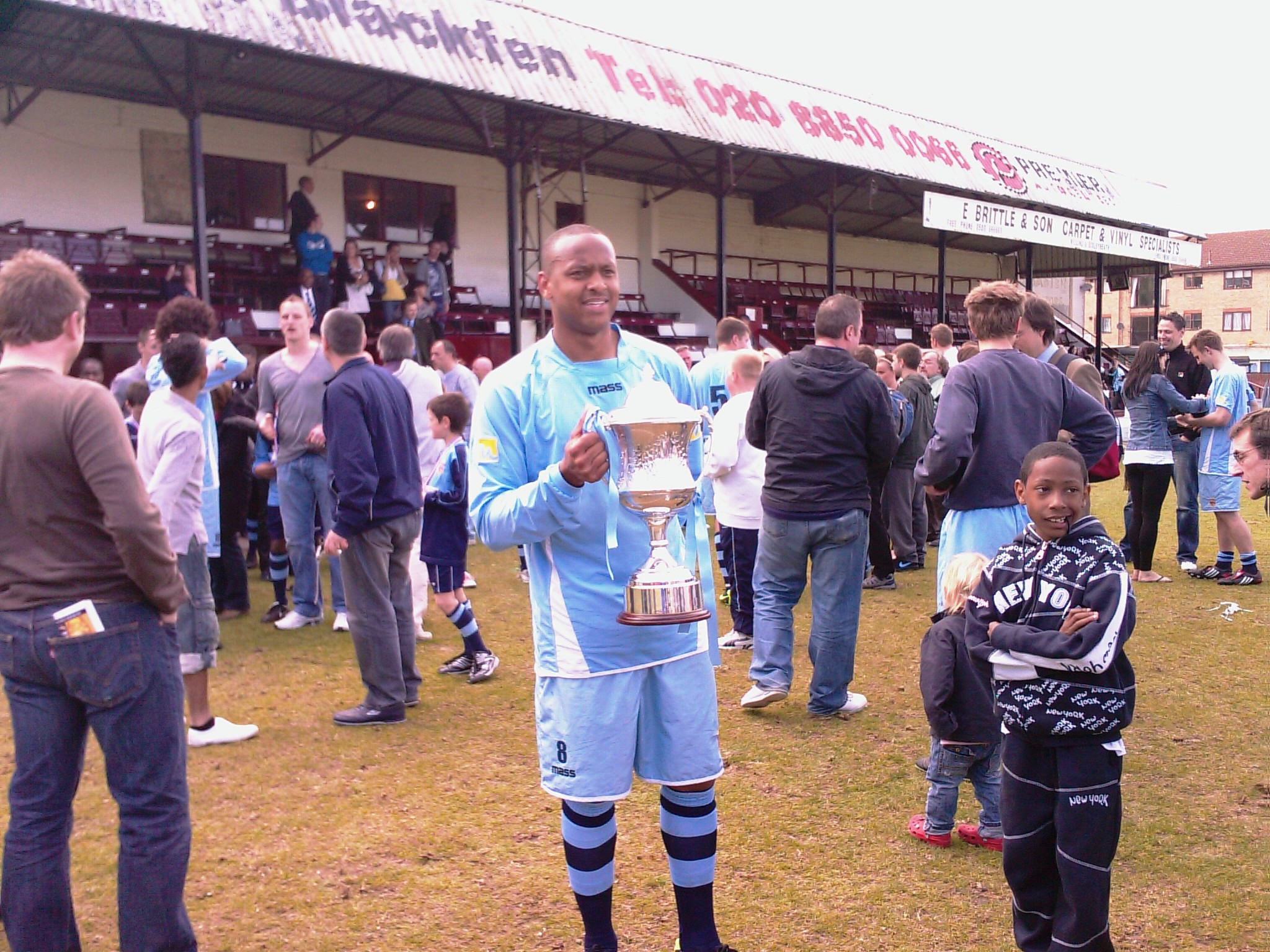
Players celebrating the Kent League Cup in 2009

- Isthmian League Division One winners: 1999–2000
- Isthmian League Division Two runners-up: 1975–76 (undefeated) (retitled Division One 1977–78), 1995–96
- Isthmian League Cup finalists: 1974–75, 2000–01
- Isthmian League Full Members Cup winners: 1999–00
- London Senior Cup winners: 2001–02 – finalists: 1978–79
- Surrey Senior Cup Winners: 1981–82 – Finalists: 1976–77, 1999–00
- Kent League Cup winners: 2008–09
- Kent League Challenge Shield winners: 2009
- Athenian League Division One runners-up: 1971–72
- Athenian League Division Two winners: 1965–66 – runners-up 1970–71
- Spartan League champions: 1963–64
- Surrey Senior League Runners-up: 1956–57, 1960–61, 1962–63
- Surrey Senior League Cup winners 1960–61, 1962–63 – finalists: 1953–54, 1959–60, 1961–62
- Surrey Senior League Charity Cup winners: 1962–63 – finalists: 1957–58 and trophy shared with Dorking: 1953–54
- Surrey Intermediate Cup finalists 1966–67, 1971–72
- Surrey Premier Cup winners 1986–87
- London Intermediate Cup finalists 1978–79
- Kent Senior Trophy finalists 2023–24
- London Senior Trophy winners 2023–24

== Club records ==
- Record attendance:
  - At The Arena – May 1954 – 1,600 – v Dorking – Surrey Senior League Charity Cup Final
  - At Selhurst Park – 15 December 1979 – 9,809 v Millwall (FA Cup second round)
- Record goalscorer – Fred Morris (1959–64 – 159 goals)
- Most goals in one match – Les Whitton (1982–83 – 5 goals v Crawley Town), Jeff Duah-Kessie (2016–17 – 5 goals v Erith & Belvedere)
- Record appearances – Alec Jackson (1977–88 – 441 plus 9 as sub)
- Record win – 21 January 1961 home v Banstead Athletic 11–0 Surrey Senior League. 14 February 2026 home v Chessington & Hook Utd 11-0 SCEFL Division One
- Record defeat – 19 March 1994 away v Staines Town 0–14 Isthmian League, 2 April 1994 away v Berkhamsted Town 1–14 Isthmian League
- Best league position: 4th in Isthmian League, Premier Division (then level 6), 1985–86
- Best FA Cup performance: 2nd round, 1979–80
- Best FA Trophy performance: 2nd round, 1981–82, 1982–83, 2001–02
- Best FA Vase performance: fourth round, 1994–95, 2008–09, 2016–17
