= Wingate & Finchley F.C. =

Association football club in London, England

Coordinates: 51°36′25″N 0°10′18″W

Wingate & Finchley
- Full name: Wingate & Finchley Football Club
- Nickname: The Blues
- Founded: 1991; 35 years ago
- Ground: The Maurice Rebak Stadium, Finchley
- Capacity: 2,638 (500 seated)
- Chairman: Aron Sharpe
- Manager: Ahmet Rifat
- League: Isthmian League Premier Division
- 2025–26: Isthmian League Premier Division, 16th of 22
- Website: www.wingatefinchley.com
Home colours	Away colours

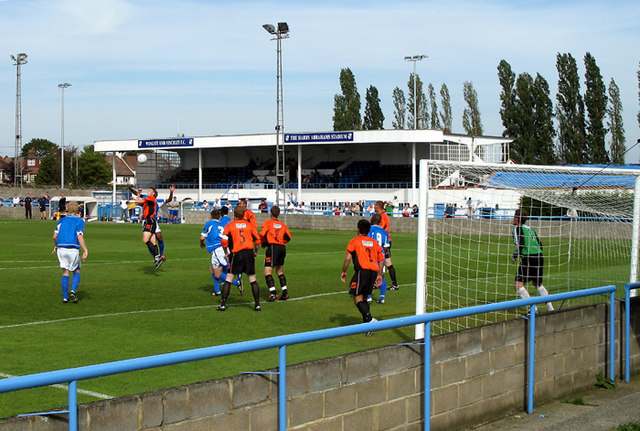
Wingate & Finchley (blue shirts) take on Wivenhoe Town at The Harry Abrahams Stadium.

Wingate & Finchley Football Club is an English football club based in Finchley in the London Borough of Barnet. The club are currently members of the Isthmian League Premier Division and play at The Maurice Rebak Stadium in North London.

== History ==
The club was established in 1991 by a merger of Wingate and Finchley. Although Finchley were the higher placed of the two clubs, the new club took Wingate's place in the Premier Division of the South Midlands League and played at Finchley's Summers Lane ground, which was renamed after Harry Abrahams, a long time Wingate supporter. In 1994–95 they finished second in the league and joined Division Three of the Isthmian League.

After a second-place finish in 1998–99 they were promoted to Division Two, but were relegated back to Division Three at the end of the following season. After league reorganisation they were placed in Division One North for the 2002–03 season, but in 2004 were transferred to the Eastern Division of the Southern League. The club later returned to Division One North of the Isthmian League. In 2009–10 they finished third, qualifying for the promotion play-offs, in which they lost 3–2 to Enfield Town. The following season the club won the Isthmian League Cup and the London Senior Cup, and finished third again. After beating Harlow Town in the play-off semi-finals, they defeated Brentwood Town 3–2 after extra time in the final, earning promotion to the Premier Division - and securing an historic Treble.

The club finished mid-table in its first season in the Premier Division, before surviving a relegation scare in 2012–13 with one match to spare. In 2013–14, the club were relegated on goal difference behind East Thurrock United despite a final day 5–0 victory. However the drama did not end there, as the resignation of Worksop Town from the Northern Premier League gave Wingate & Finchley a much welcomed reprieve from relegation. The club finished the 2015–16 season in 13th position on 60 points. On 8 October 2018, the club pulled a coup by employing Nicky Shorey and Glen Little as managers. This was short-lived, as Shorey left on 29 October 2018.

The 2025–26 season saw the club win the Alan Turvey Trophy for a second time in the club's history, defeating Ramsgate 1–0 after extra-time in the final.

== Club identity ==
Wingate & Finchley are often perceived as a 'Jewish club', due to Finchley's sizeable Jewish community and a number of other factors, including sporting the Star of David on the club's badge, having a number of Jews on the committee of the club and being able to apply for special dispensation to move their games should they fall on Yom Kippur. One of Wingate & Finchley's predecessor clubs, Wingate, was established to combat anti-semitism. The original Wingate club was named after Orde Wingate, who had been involved in training the Haganah, the precursor to the Israel Defense Forces.

== Fans and rivalries ==
Wingate & Finchley have an ultras group called the BlueArmyUltras which was formed in 2016. Attendances are quite low for the league with Wingate only getting an average attendance of 141 in the 2017/18 season.

Wingate & Finchley also have a few rivalries with other clubs. These include Hendon, Enfield Town & Haringey Borough as the bigger rivals and also Harrow Borough, Potters Bar due to their close proximity and competitive similarities. To an even lesser extent, Cockfosters may be considered rivals due to both sides commonly playing each other in the London Senior Cup.

Former British Prime Minister Margaret Thatcher was a patron of Wingate & Finchley and played a key role in the formation of the club. Following her death in 2013, Wingate & Finchley held a minute's silence.

== Ground ==
Wingate & Finchley play their home games at The Maurice Rebak Stadium, Summers Lane, Finchley, London, N12 0PD.

The stadium used to be called Summers Lane when Finchley played there. After the merger it was renamed The Harry Abrahams Stadium after a life-long Wingate fan. In the summer of 2016, the stadium was renamed to its current name, The Maurice Rebak Stadium. It is named after the co-founder who died earlier that year. Wingate and Finchley also have a youth team. They train at The Football Pad, Barnet Lane in Barnet.

On 20 September 2025, during an Isthmian League match, Chichester City player Billy Vigar suffered a brain injury after accidentally colliding with a wall which surrounded the pitch at The Maurice Rebak Stadium, and he died on 25 September. In October, the club demolished the concrete wall involved in the accident.

== Current squad ==
As of 26 April 2026.

Note: Flags indicate national team as defined under FIFA eligibility rules; some limited exceptions apply. Players may hold more than one non-FIFA nationality.

Pos.	Nation	Player
GK	ENG	Ben Goode
GK	WAL	Fergal Hale-Brown
DF	ENG	Bobby Webb
DF	ENG	Ahmet Biler
DF	ENG	Loic Hernandez
DF	ENG	Luke Ifil
DF	ENG	Ryan Sellers
DF	ENG	Rhamar Garrett-Douglas
DF	ENG	Josh Dawodu
DF	ENG	Ola Williams
DF	ENG	Billy Cracknell
MF	ENG	Mathew Achuba

No.	Pos.	Nation	Player
MF	ENG	Fahad Nazor	
MF	ENG	Will Seager	
MF	ENG	Alkeo Bani	
MF	ENG	Christian Frimpong	
FW	ENG	Emmanuel Yeboah	
FW	ENG	Zack Newton	
FW	ENG	Elliot Long	
FW	ENG	Anointed Chukwu	
FW	ENG	Ben Ward-Cochrane	
FW	ENG	Ruben Carvalho	
FW	ENG	Tommy Roberts	
FW	ENG	Luke Deslandes	

== Records ==
- Best FA Cup performance: Third qualifying round, 1999–2000
- Best FA Trophy performance: Second round, 2018–19
- Best FA Vase performance: Third round, 2004–05
- Record attendance: 528 vs Brentwood Town, Isthmian League Division One North play-off, 2011
- Biggest victory: 9–1 vs Winslow United, South Midlands League, 23 November 1991
- Heaviest defeat: 0–9 vs Edgware Town, Isthmian League Division Two, 15 January 2000
- Most appearances: Marc Morris, 720
- Most goals: Marc Morris, 650

== Honours ==
As Wingate & Finchley

- Alan Turvey Trophy
  - Winners (2): 2010–11, 2025–26
- London Senior Cup
  - Winners 1994–95, 2010–11
  - Runners Up 2004–05

As Finchley FC

- Middlesex Senior Cup
  - Winners 1928–29, 1943–44, 1951–52
- London Senior Cup
  - Winners 1932–33, 1951–52, 1952-53 (Joint holders with Walthamstow Avenue)
- Middlesex Charity Cup
  - Winners 1942–43, 1950–51
- Championship London League
  - Winners 1936–37
- London League Challenge Cup
  - Winners 1934–35
- London Intermediate Cup
  - Winners 1932–33
- Middlesex Intermediate Cup
  - Winners 1932–33
- Athenian League
  - Winners 1953–54

As Wingate FC

- Herts County League Division One
  - Winners 1984–85
