= Yeading F.C. =

Yeading
- Full name: Yeading Football Club
- Nickname: The Ding
- Founded: 1960
- Dissolved: 2007; 19 years ago
- Ground: The Warren, Yeading
- Capacity: 3,500 (250 seated)
- 2006–07: Conference South, 16th
Home colours	Away colours

Yeading F.C. were an English football club from Yeading in the London Borough of Hillingdon, west London. In 2007 they merged with Hayes to form Hayes & Yeading United.

== Club history ==
Their roots trace to a youth club formed in Yeading in 1960. They have been known as Yeading Football Club after 1965. However, they remained in the junior and intermediate ranks until the 1980s when they were at last granted senior status, joining the old London Spartan League in 1984 and the Isthmian League in 1987. In 1990 they won their first national title, the FA Vase, as well as their regional division of the league. The following year they were promoted to the league's Premier Division for the first time but were relegated in 1998.

After the Isthmian League Division One was divided in 2002 they were placed in Division One North. They won the championship of that league in the 2003–04 season, returning to the Premier Division. A strong start to the season was crowned on 5 December 2004 with their being drawn at home to Premiership side Newcastle United in the third round of the FA Cup, after beating Slough Town 3–1. Yeading's average league game attendance of 137 contrasted with Newcastle's nearly 52,000. After some confusion as to whether the game could be played in front of 2,300 at Yeading's ground, The Warren, it was decided to play it on 9 January 2005 at Loftus Road, and the crowd numbered 10,824. A scoreless first half held out hope of an upset but two second-half Newcastle United goals decided the game. Yeading went on to win the Isthmian League championship that season, earning promotion to Conference South.

On 28 October 2006, Yeading were drawn against Nottingham Forest in the FA Cup first round. The game was one of the biggest in their history, going up against former back to back European Champions. Yeading were hoping to upset the East Midlands team, but the task proved too much for The Ding, as they were emphatically beaten 5–0.

On 18 May 2007, Yeading announced that they would be forming a merger with fellow Conference South side Hayes. The new club retained its place in the Conference South, and is now known as Hayes & Yeading United.

== Stadium ==
The club played at The Warren. The ground is located just off Springfield Road in Hayes, Middlesex. When Yeading merged with Hayes, the Warren fell into disuse as Hayes' Church Road became the new club's ground. It was still used for youth and reserve team purposes until Church Road was sold to fund the building of a new stadium on the same site as The Warren. Following the stadium's demolition, The SkyEx Community Stadium was built and opened in 2016. One terrace from The Warren still stands, outside the new stadium behind one of the goals.

== Records ==
- FA Cup best performance: third round proper – 2004–05
- FA Trophy best performance: third round proper – 2006–07
- FA Vase best performance: winners – 1989–90
