= List of Greater London League seasons =

The Greater London League ran for seven seasons between 1964 and 1971.

== 1964–65 ==
=== A Section ===
The A Section was composed of:

- Six clubs from the London League Premier Division (Barkingside, Epping Town, Hatfield Town, Hermes, London Transport and West Thurrock Athletic)
- Three clubs from the Aetolian League (East Ham United, Eton Manor and Ford United)
- Two clubs from the London League Division One (CAV Athletic and Canvey Island)
- One club from the Essex and Suffolk Border League (Crittall Athletic)
- Chingford

Pos	Team	Pld	W	D	L	GF	GA	GD	Pts	Notes
1	Eton Manor	24	16	6	2	79	26	+53	38	
2	Hatfield Town	24	16	4	4	76	37	+39	36	Joined Metropolitan League
3	Crittall Athletic	24	16	3	5	59	37	+22	35	
4	Ford United	24	14	4	6	68	35	+33	32	
5	West Thurrock Athletic	24	14	4	6	64	34	+30	32	
6	East Ham United	24	12	4	8	64	54	+10	28	
7	Epping Town	24	10	5	9	56	52	+4	25	
8	Canvey Island	24	9	2	13	39	53	−14	20	
9	Chingford (R)	24	5	6	13	30	47	−17	16	Relegated to Division One
10	Barkingside (R)	24	6	3	15	36	76	−40	15	Relegated to Division One
11	Hermes (R)	24	6	2	16	40	57	−17	14	Relegated to Division One
12	CAV Athletic (R)	24	5	2	17	41	58	−17	12	Relegated to Division One
13	London Transport (R)	24	4	1	19	28	114	−86	9	Relegated to Division One

Source: Non-League Matters
(R) Relegated

=== B Section ===
The B Section was composed of:

- Seven clubs from the Aetolian League (Beckenham Town, Cray Wanderers, Crockenhill, Faversham Town, Sheppey United, Snowdown Colliery Welfare and Whitstable Town)
- Four clubs from the London League Premier Division (ROFSA, Slade Green Athletic, Ulysses and Woolwich Polytechnic)
- Tunbridge Wells Rangers

Pos	Team	Pld	W	D	L	GF	GA	GD	Pts	Notes
1	Sheppey United	22	20	0	2	71	20	+51	40	Joined Metropolitan League
2	Cray Wanderers	21	15	3	3	63	24	+39	33	
3	Snowdown Colliery Welfare	22	15	3	4	52	22	+30	33	Left the league
4	Crockenhill	22	12	2	8	64	35	+29	26	
5	Beckenham	22	9	4	9	46	44	+2	22	Renamed Beckenham Town
6	Woolwich Polytechnic	22	10	2	10	44	45	−1	22	
7	Ulysses	22	9	3	10	31	39	−8	21	
8	Tunbridge Wells Rangers	22	8	4	10	29	48	−19	20	Renamed Tunbridge Wells
9	Faversham Town	22	8	3	11	38	48	−10	19	
10	Whitstable (R)	22	6	3	13	49	76	−27	15	Relegated to Division One, renamed Whitstable Town
11	Slade Green Athletic (R)	22	2	2	18	20	67	−47	6	Relegated to Division One
12	ROFSA (R)	21	1	3	17	21	60	−39	5	Relegated to Division One

Source: Non-League Matters
(R) Relegated

== 1965–66 ==
=== Premier Division ===
Pos	Team	Pld	W	D	L	GF	GA	GD	Pts	Notes
1	Cray Wanderers	26	19	4	3	57	30	+27	42	Joined Metropolitan League
2	West Thurrock Athletic	26	16	6	4	80	39	+41	38	
3	Crittall Athletic	26	16	5	5	80	45	+35	37	Joined Metropolitan League
4	Eton Manor	26	15	4	7	66	42	+24	34	
5	Canvey Island	26	16	2	8	59	39	+20	34	
6	Crockenhill	26	13	4	9	60	44	+16	30	
7	Ford United	26	13	4	9	49	42	+7	30	
8	Ulysses	26	10	2	14	37	42	−5	22	
9	Faversham Town	26	10	1	15	43	57	−14	21	
10	Epping Town	26	8	4	14	51	60	−9	20	
11	East Ham United	26	8	2	16	44	83	−39	18	
12	Woolwich Polytechnic	26	7	3	16	43	64	−21	17	
13	Beckenham Town (R)	26	5	2	19	39	77	−38	12	Relegated to Division One
14	Tunbridge Wells	26	3	3	20	21	65	−44	9	Left the league

Source: Non-League Matters
(R) Relegated

=== Division One ===
Four new clubs joined Division One for the 1965–66 season:

- Bexley
- Highfield
- Penhill Standard
- Swanley

Pos	Team	Pld	W	D	L	GF	GA	GD	Pts	Notes
1	Highfield (P)	22	14	3	5	62	34	+28	31	Promoted to Premier Division
2	Barkingside (P)	22	14	3	5	51	32	+19	31	Promoted to Premier Division
3	Swanley	22	12	4	6	53	36	+17	28	Renamed Swanley Town
4	Whitstable Town	22	10	6	6	40	30	+10	26	
5	Hermes	22	11	3	8	64	31	+33	25	
6	Bexley	22	9	4	9	42	44	−2	22	
7	Chingford	22	8	4	10	53	48	+5	20	
8	Penhill Standard	22	6	6	10	34	41	−7	18	
9	CAV Athletic	22	8	2	12	38	46	−8	18	
10	Slade Green Athletic	22	7	4	11	35	56	−21	18	
11	London Transport	22	7	2	13	32	70	−38	16	
12	ROFSA	22	4	3	15	34	70	−36	11	Left the league

Source: Non-League Matters
(P) Promoted

== 1966–67 ==
=== Premier Division ===
Four new clubs joined the Premier Division for the 1966–67 season:

- Barkingside (promoted from Division One)
- Highfield (promoted from Division One)
- Willesden (from the Spartan League)
- Deal Town (from the Southern League)

Pos	Team	Pld	W	D	L	GF	GA	GD	Pts	Notes
1	Epping Town	26	16	6	4	73	32	+41	38	
2	Eton Manor	26	15	5	6	58	29	+29	35	
3	West Thurrock Athletic	26	12	8	6	53	39	+14	32	
4	East Ham United	26	13	5	8	58	45	+13	31	
5	Deal Town	26	12	3	11	57	58	−1	27	
6	Crockenhill	26	11	4	11	52	55	−3	26	
7	Ford United	26	9	7	10	44	45	−1	25	
8	Ulysses	26	8	9	9	49	63	−14	25	
9	Highfield	26	8	8	10	45	58	−13	24	
10	Woolwich Polytechnic	26	6	11	9	33	41	−8	23	
11	Chertsey Town	26	9	5	12	47	66	−19	23	Joined Spartan League
12	Canvey Island	26	8	5	13	54	53	+1	21	
13	Barkingside (R)	26	7	5	14	51	68	−17	19	Relegated to Division Two
14	Willesden (R)	26	5	5	16	41	63	−22	15	Relegated to Division Two

Source: Non-League Matters
(R) Relegated

=== Division One ===
Division One featured three new clubs for the 1966–67 season:

- Beckenham Town (relegated from the Premier Division)
- Battersea United
- RAS & RA

Pos	Team	Pld	W	D	L	GF	GA	GD	Pts	Notes
1	Battersea United (P)	22	18	3	1	58	14	+44	39	Promoted to new Division One
2	Swanley Town (P)	22	15	2	5	60	34	+26	32	Promoted to new Division One, renamed Swanley
3	Slade Green Athletic	22	11	6	5	53	40	+13	28	
4	Beckenham Town	22	9	6	7	47	42	+5	24	
5	Chingford	22	10	3	9	65	37	+28	23	
6	Penhill Standard	22	9	5	8	43	48	−5	23	
7	Whitstable Town	22	8	3	11	35	35	0	19	Joined Kent Premier League
8	CAV Athletic	22	8	3	11	35	41	−6	19	
9	Bexley	22	6	6	10	34	41	−7	18	
10	Hermes	22	5	4	13	28	65	−37	14	Left the league
11	RAS & RA	22	5	3	14	24	53	−29	13	
12	London Transport	22	5	2	15	37	69	−32	12	

Source: Non-League Matters
(P) Promoted

== 1967–68 ==
The Premier Division was renamed Division One, and Division One renamed Division Two prior to the start of the 1967–68 season.

=== Division One ===
Division One featured three new clubs for the 1967–68 season:

- Battersea United (promoted from old Division One)
- Swanley (promoted from old Division One)
- Woodford Town (from the Metropolitan League)

Pos	Team	Pld	W	D	L	GF	GA	GD	Pts	Notes
1	Canvey Island	26	17	4	5	61	37	+24	38	
2	Eton Manor	26	13	9	4	52	26	+26	35	
3	Woodford Town	26	13	5	8	46	35	+11	31	
4	Ford United	26	11	8	7	37	31	+6	30	
5	Deal Town	26	10	9	7	40	30	+10	29	
6	Battersea United	26	11	7	8	42	35	+7	29	
7	Highfield	26	9	10	7	56	47	+9	28	
8	East Ham United	26	10	7	9	46	40	+6	27	
9	West Thurrock Athletic	26	13	1	12	52	51	+1	27	Left the league
10	Epping Town	26	11	4	11	58	50	+8	26	
11	Swanley	26	8	7	11	49	52	−3	23	
12	Ulysses	26	7	6	13	34	54	−20	20	
13	Crockenhill	26	3	7	16	25	64	−39	13	Joined Kent League
14	Woolwich Polytechnic (R)	26	2	4	20	23	69	−46	8	Relegated to Division Two

Source: Non-League Matters
(R) Relegated

=== Division Two ===
Division Two featured three new clubs for the 1967–68 season:

- Barkingside (relegated from the Premier Division)
- Willesden (relegated from the Premier Division)
- Brentsonians

Pos	Team	Pld	W	D	L	GF	GA	GD	Pts	Notes
1	Willesden (P)	20	12	6	2	46	14	+32	30	Promoted to Division One
2	Chingford (P)	20	14	0	6	58	30	+28	28	Promoted to Division One
3	Brentstonians	20	11	5	4	39	26	+13	27	
4	Barkingside	20	10	5	5	41	30	+11	25	
5	Bexley	20	9	6	5	41	33	+8	24	
6	Beckenham Town	20	9	5	6	45	26	+19	23	
7	Slade Green Athletic	20	7	4	9	21	33	−12	18	
8	Penhill Standard	20	6	5	9	32	38	−6	17	
9	CAV Athletic	20	5	4	11	25	44	−19	14	
10	RAS & RA	20	3	1	16	17	49	−32	7	
11	London Transport	20	1	5	14	21	63	−42	7	

Source: Non-League Matters
(P) Promoted

== 1968–69 ==
=== Division One ===
Division One featured two new clubs for the 1968–69 season:

- Willesden (promoted from Division Two)
- Chingford (promoted from Division Two)

Pos	Team	Pld	W	D	L	GF	GA	GD	Pts	Notes
1	Canvey Island	24	14	9	1	53	20	+33	37	
2	Deal Town	24	14	7	3	42	23	+19	35	
3	Willesden	24	13	7	4	50	29	+21	33	
4	East Ham United	24	13	5	6	65	26	+39	31	
5	Epping Town	24	13	4	7	58	33	+25	30	Joined Metropolitan League
6	Eton Manor	24	9	4	11	29	40	−11	22	
7	Swanley	24	8	4	12	41	44	−3	20	
8	Ulysses	24	6	7	11	37	50	−13	19	
9	Ford United	24	7	5	12	24	43	−19	19	
10	Battersea United	24	6	7	11	29	48	−19	19	Left the league
11	Woodford Town	24	3	12	9	30	38	−8	18	Left the league
12	Chingford	24	6	3	15	33	59	−26	15	
13	Highfield	24	5	4	15	32	70	−38	14	

Source: Non-League Matters

=== Division Two ===
Division Two featured three new clubs for the 1968–69 season:

- Woolwich Polytechnic (relegated from the Division One)
- Northern Polytechnic
- Heathside Sports

Pos	Team	Pld	W	D	L	GF	GA	GD	Pts	Notes
1	Penhill Standard (P)	22	15	5	2	68	28	+40	35	Promotion to Greater London League
2	Slade Green Athletic (P)	22	14	6	2	45	19	+26	34	Promotion to Greater London League
3	Brentstonians (P)	22	13	1	8	44	26	+18	27	Promotion to Greater London League
4	Beckenham Town	22	12	2	8	45	29	+16	26	Left the league
5	Northern Polytechnic (P)	22	9	7	6	41	45	−4	25	Promotion to Greater London League
6	Bexley (P)	22	10	4	8	41	38	+3	24	Promotion to Greater London League
7	Barkingside (P)	22	10	1	11	42	42	0	21	Promotion to Greater London League
8	Heathside Sports (P)	22	7	6	9	53	51	+2	20	Promotion to Greater London League
9	Woolwich Polytechnic (P)	22	8	4	10	36	48	−12	20	Promotion to Greater London League
10	RAS & RA (P)	22	6	4	12	43	54	−11	16	Promotion to Greater London League
11	CAV Athletic (P)	22	3	4	15	31	60	−29	10	Promotion to Greater London League
12	London Transport	22	2	2	18	27	76	−49	6	Left the league

Source: Non-League Matters
(P) Promoted

== 1969–70 ==
The league featured one new club for the 1969–70 season:

- Merton United

Pos	Team	Pld	W	D	L	GF	GA	GD	Pts	Notes
1	East Ham United	40	30	6	4	134	39	+95	66	Left the league
2	Ford United	40	29	4	7	117	40	+77	62	Placed in A Section
3	Swanley	40	29	3	8	90	50	+40	61	Placed in B Section
4	Eton Manor	40	25	9	6	90	39	+51	59	Placed in A Section
5	Brentstonians	40	24	11	5	63	42	+21	59	Placed in B Section
6	Canvey Island	40	27	4	9	145	47	+98	58	Placed in A Section
7	Deal Town	40	23	6	11	90	39	+51	52	Placed in B Section
8	Bexley	40	18	8	14	94	81	+13	44	Placed in A Section
9	Highfield	40	16	11	13	78	65	+13	43	Placed in B Section
10	Slade Green Athletic	40	17	7	16	69	67	+2	41	Joined Kent League
11	Northern Polytechnic	40	16	6	18	57	54	+3	38	Placed in B Section
12	Penhill Standard	40	14	10	16	80	87	−7	38	Placed in A Section
13	Ulysses	40	15	4	21	68	77	−9	34	Placed in B Section
14	CAV	40	13	8	19	69	95	−26	34	Placed in A Section
15	Chingford	40	12	7	21	64	94	−30	31	Placed in B Section
16	Willesden	40	8	10	22	41	89	−48	26	Placed in A Section
17	Woolwich Polytechnic	40	9	4	27	45	96	−51	22	Placed in B Section
18	Merton United	40	8	4	28	48	113	−65	20	Left the league
19	Barkingside	40	5	9	26	36	127	−91	19	Placed in B Section
20	RAS & RA	40	5	7	28	35	107	−72	17	Placed in A Section, Changed name to Royal Arsenal Sports
21	Heathside Sports	40	4	8	28	37	102	−65	16	Placed in B Section

Source: Non-League Matters

== 1970–71 ==
Two new clubs joined the league for the 1970–71 season:

- BROB Barnet
- Vokins

=== A Section ===
Pos	Team	Pld	W	D	L	GF	GA	GD	Pts	Notes
1	Ford United	18	16	1	1	64	16	+48	33	Joined Metropolitan–London League Division One
2	Eton Manor	18	12	3	3	48	12	+36	27	Joined Metropolitan–London League Division One
3	Canvey Island	18	11	3	4	45	22	+23	25	Joined Metropolitan–London League Division One
4	BROB Barnet	18	8	4	6	30	27	+3	20	Joined Metropolitan–London League Division One
5	Vokins (R)	18	8	3	7	32	34	−2	19	Joined Metropolitan–London League Division Two
6	Bexley (R)	18	8	3	7	36	40	−4	19	Joined Metropolitan–London League Division Two
7	Willesden	18	5	3	10	16	36	−20	13	Joined Metropolitan–London League Division One
8	Royal Arsenal Sports (R)	18	4	1	13	14	51	−37	9	Joined Metropolitan–London League Division Two, renamed RAS & RA
9	CAV Athletic	18	3	2	13	22	52	−30	8	Left the league
10	Penhill Standard (R)	18	2	3	13	29	46	−17	7	Joined Metropolitan–London League Division Two

Source: Non-League Matters
(R) Relegated

=== B Section ===
Pos	Team	Pld	W	D	L	GF	GA	GD	Pts	Notes
1	Ulysses	18	11	6	1	39	14	+25	28	Joined Metropolitan–London League Division One
2	Highfield (R)	18	11	5	2	38	18	+20	27	Joined Metropolitan–London League Division Two
3	Swanley	18	11	4	3	36	14	+22	26	Joined Metropolitan–London League Division One
4	Deal Town	18	9	3	6	27	27	0	21	Joined Kent League
5	Northern Polytechnic (R)	18	7	5	6	26	23	+3	19	Joined Metropolitan–London League Division Two, renamed Polytechnic
6	Brentstonians (R)	18	4	8	6	20	21	−1	16	Joined Metropolitan–London League Division Two
7	Heathside Sports (R)	18	4	5	9	28	31	−3	13	Joined Metropolitan–London League Division Two
8	Chingford	18	4	5	9	15	25	−10	13	Joined Metropolitan–London League Division One
9	Barkingside (R)	18	2	6	10	11	42	−31	10	Joined Metropolitan–London League Division Two
10	Woolwich Polytechnic (R)	18	0	7	11	18	43	−25	7	Joined Metropolitan–London League Division Two, renamed Thames Polytechnic

Source: Non-League Matters
(R) Relegated
