= 1975–76 London Spartan League =

London Spartan League
- Season: 1975–76

The 1975–76 London Spartan League season was the 58th in the history of Spartan League, and the first as London Spartan League. The league consisted of 33 teams.

== Division One ==
London Spartan League Division One
- Season: 1975–76
- Champions: Farnborough Town
- Promoted: Farnborough Town; Kingsbury Town; Chertsey Town
- Relegated: Penhill Standard

The division featured 16 teams.

- 8 came from last season's Spartan League
  - Farnborough Town (1st)
  - Chertsey Town (2nd)
  - Hoddesdon Town (4th)
  - Banstead Athletic (5th)
  - Berkhamsted Town (6th)
  - Bracknell Town (7th)
  - Kingsbury Town (9th)
  - Farnham Town (11th)
- 8 came from last season's Metropolitan–London League
  - Cray Wanderers (1st)
  - Alma Swanley (2nd)
  - Swanley Town (4th)
  - Penhill Standard (6th)
  - Hatfield Town (7th)
  - Chingford (8th)
  - Heathside Sports (9th)
  - East Ham United (10th)

=== League table ===
Pos	Team	Pld	W	D	L	GF	GA	GR	Pts	Promotion or relegation
1	Farnborough Town (C, P)	30	22	5	3	85	23	3.696	49	Promotion to Athenian League Division Two
2	Bracknell Town	30	21	7	2	73	39	1.872	49	
3	Alma Swanley	30	19	8	3	75	38	1.974	46	
4	Swanley Town	30	16	8	6	62	44	1.409	40	
5	East Ham United	30	13	7	10	42	36	1.167	33	
6	Cray Wanderers	30	11	9	10	55	54	1.019	31	
7	Kingsbury Town (P)	30	11	7	12	44	43	1.023	29	Promotion to Athenian League Division Two
8	Hoddesdon Town	30	9	8	13	31	33	0.939	26	
9	Farnham Town	30	10	6	14	47	61	0.770	26	
10	Heathside Sports	30	9	8	13	26	35	0.743	26	
11	Chingford	30	9	7	14	34	47	0.723	25	
12	Penhill Standard (R)	30	10	4	16	41	53	0.774	24	Relegation to Division Two
13	Hatfield Town	30	8	8	14	49	69	0.710	24	
14	Banstead Athletic	30	6	7	17	39	64	0.609	19	
15	Berkhamsted Town	30	5	8	17	28	59	0.475	18	
16	Chertsey Town (P)	30	6	3	21	32	65	0.492	15	Promotion to Athenian League Division Two

Rules for classification: 1) points; 2) goal ratio.
(C) Champions; (P) Promoted; (R) Relegated

== Division Two ==
London Spartan League Division Two
- Season: 1975–76
- Promoted: BROB Barnet; Frimley Green; Highfield; Virginia Water to Athenian League: Chalfont St. Peter

The division featured 17 teams.

- 4 came from last season's Spartan League
  - Crown & Manor (13th)
  - Chalfont St. Peter (14th)
  - Frimley Green (15th)
  - Amersham Town (16th)
- 10 came from last season's Metropolitan–London League
  - Highfield (11th)
  - East Thurrock United (12th)
  - BROB Barnet (13th)
  - Muirhead Sports (14th)
  - Bexley (15th)
  - Barkingside (16th)
  - Thames Polytechnic (17th)
  - Ulysses (18th)
  - Brentstonians, also known as Brent (19th)
  - RAS & RA, also known as Royal Arsenal S & R A (20th)
- 2 came from Surrey Senior League
  - Virginia Water
  - Whyteleafe
- 1 came from South East London Amateur League
  - Beckenham Town

=== League table ===
Pos	Team	Pld	W	D	L	GF	GA	GR	Pts	Promotion or relegation
1	Chalfont St. Peter (C, P)	32	28	2	2	92	16	5.750	58	Promotion to Athenian League Division Two
2	Frimley Green (P)	32	18	8	6	86	32	2.688	44	Promotion to Division One
3	Highfield (P)	32	14	11	7	60	50	1.200	39	Promotion to Division One
4	BROB Barnet (P)	32	14	9	9	66	40	1.650	37	Promotion to Division One
5	Virginia Water (P)	32	14	9	9	54	44	1.227	37	Promotion to Division One
6	East Thurrock United	32	13	9	10	54	42	1.286	35	
7	Amersham Town	32	14	4	14	52	49	1.061	32	
8	Barkingside	32	14	4	14	57	57	1.000	32	
9	Muirhead Sports	32	13	6	13	53	62	0.855	32	Left the league
10	Thames Polytechnic	32	13	6	13	25	67	0.373	32	
11	Beckenham Town	32	12	7	13	44	46	0.957	31	
12	Ulysses	32	11	7	14	39	48	0.813	29	
13	Crown & Manor	32	9	11	12	35	44	0.795	29	
14	Whyteleafe	32	11	7	14	39	53	0.736	29	
15	Brent	32	10	3	19	42	57	0.737	23	
16	Bexley	32	5	4	23	29	85	0.341	14	
17	Royal Arsenal S & R A	32	3	5	24	23	86	0.267	11	

(C) Champions; (P) Promoted
