= 1976–77 London Spartan League =

London Spartan League
- Season: 1976–77

The 1976–77 London Spartan League season was the 59th in the history of Spartan League, and the 2nd as London Spartan League. The league consisted of 31 teams.

== Division One ==
London Spartan League Division One
- Season: 1976–77
- Champions: Cray Wanderers
- Promoted: Hoddesdon Town
- Relegated: Highfield; Hatfield Town; Virginia Water

The division featured 16 teams, 12 from last season and 4 new teams, all promoted from last season's Division Two:

- BROB Barnet
- Frimley Green
- Highfield
- Virginia Water

=== League table ===
Pos	Team	Pld	W	D	L	GF	GA	GR	Pts	Promotion or relegation
1	Cray Wanderers (C)	30	23	3	4	66	21	3.143	49	
2	Alma Swanley	30	19	7	4	71	35	2.029	45	
3	East Ham United	30	15	8	7	62	35	1.771	38	
4	Chingford	30	16	5	9	67	39	1.718	37	
5	Bracknell Town	30	14	7	9	36	26	1.385	35	
6	Berkhamsted Town	30	12	9	9	48	48	1.000	33	
7	Frimley Green	30	11	8	11	42	38	1.105	30	
8	Farnham Town	30	11	7	12	63	62	1.016	29	
9	Highfield (R)	30	11	7	12	48	64	0.750	29	Relegation to Senior Division
10	Swanley Town	30	11	6	13	53	66	0.803	28	
11	Hoddesdon Town (P)	30	11	5	14	42	50	0.840	27	Promotion to Athenian League
12	Heathside Sports	30	8	10	12	35	39	0.897	26	
13	Banstead Athletic	30	9	6	15	39	40	0.975	24	
14	BROB Barnet	30	9	6	15	38	58	0.655	24	
15	Hatfield Town (R)	30	5	11	14	33	44	0.750	21	Relegation to Senior Division
16	Virginia Water (R)	30	1	3	26	20	98	0.204	5	Relegation to Senior Division

Rules for classification: 1) points; 2) goal ratio.
(C) Champions; (P) Promoted; (R) Relegated

== Division Two ==
London Spartan League Division Two
- Season: 1976–77
- Champions: Ulysses
- Promoted: Ulysses; Whyteleafe; Barkingside; Welling United

The division featured 15 teams, 11 from last season and 4 new teams:

- Penhill Standard, relegated from last season's Division One
- Fisher Athletic
- Welling United
- Policrom

=== League table ===
Pos	Team	Pld	W	D	L	GF	GA	GR	Pts	Promotion or relegation
1	Ulysses (C, P)	28	16	8	4	53	20	2.650	40	Promotion to Premier Division
2	Fisher Athletic	28	16	7	5	48	21	2.286	39	
3	Whyteleafe (P)	28	16	7	5	50	31	1.613	39	Promotion to Premier Division
4	Barkingside (P)	28	15	8	5	65	33	1.970	38	Promotion to Premier Division
5	Beckenham Town	28	15	8	5	60	32	1.875	38	
6	Welling United (P)	28	16	5	7	54	34	1.588	37	Promotion to Premier Division
7	Crown & Manor	28	13	6	9	50	31	1.613	32	
8	East Thurrock United	28	11	4	13	36	48	0.750	26	
9	Policrom	28	8	8	12	36	49	0.735	24	
10	Thames Polytechnic	28	6	10	12	39	46	0.848	22	
11	Bexley	28	9	4	15	35	52	0.673	22	
12	Amersham Town	28	7	6	15	38	57	0.667	20	
13	Penhill Standard	28	5	6	17	22	58	0.379	16	
14	Brent	28	3	9	16	24	50	0.480	15	
15	Royal Arsenal S & R A	28	4	4	20	32	68	0.471	12	

(C) Champions; (P) Promoted
