= 1977–78 London Spartan League =

London Spartan League
- Season: 1977–78

The 1977–78 London Spartan League season was the 60th in the history of Spartan League, and the 3rd as London Spartan League. The league consisted of 32 teams.

== Premier Division ==
London Spartan League Premier Division
- Season: 1977–78
- Champions: Cray Wanderers
- Promoted: Welling United
- Relegated: BROB Barnet; Barkingside

The previous season Division One changed name to Premier Division before this season.
The division featured 16 teams, 12 from last season and 4 new teams, all promoted from last season's Division Two:

- Ulysses
- Whyteleafe
- Barkingside
- Welling United

=== League table ===
Pos	Team	Pld	W	D	L	GF	GA	GR	Pts	Promotion or relegation
1	Cray Wanderers (C)	30	21	5	4	74	30	2.467	47	Transferred to the Kent League
2	Banstead Athletic	30	19	6	5	56	28	2.000	44	
3	Alma Swanley	30	18	5	7	57	33	1.727	41	
4	East Ham United	30	15	8	7	75	41	1.829	38	Transferred to the Essex Senior League
5	Heathside Sports	30	11	12	7	44	38	1.158	34	Left the league
6	Welling United (P)	30	15	4	11	45	39	1.154	34	Promotion to Athenian League
7	Chingford	30	13	7	10	60	44	1.364	33	
8	Farnham Town	30	13	7	10	59	46	1.283	33	
9	Swanley Town	30	12	9	9	58	48	1.208	33	
10	Berkhamsted Town	30	11	7	12	43	44	0.977	29	
11	Ulysses	30	9	8	13	42	55	0.764	26	
12	Bracknell Town	30	9	7	14	45	44	1.023	25	
13	Whyteleafe	30	5	8	17	29	60	0.483	18	
14	Frimley Green	30	4	8	18	27	59	0.458	16	
15	BROB Barnet (R)	30	6	4	20	33	77	0.429	16	Relegation to Senior Division
16	Barkingside (R)	30	4	5	21	26	87	0.299	13	Relegation to Senior Division

Rules for classification: 1) points; 2) goal ratio.
(C) Champions; (P) Promoted; (R) Relegated

== Senior Division ==
London Spartan League Senior Division
- Season: 1977–78
- Champions: Fisher Athletic
- Promoted: Fisher Athletic; Beckenham Town; Amersham Town; Hatfield Town; East Thurrock United

The previous season Division Two changed name to Senior Division before this season.
The division featured 16 teams, 11 from last season and 5 new teams:

- Highfield, relegated from last season's Division One
- Hatfield Town, relegated from last season's Division One
- Virginia Water, relegated from last season's Division One
- London Borough Of Greenwich
- Wandsworth, joined from Surrey Senior League

=== League table ===
Pos	Team	Pld	W	D	L	GF	GA	GR	Pts	Promotion or relegation
1	Fisher Athletic (C, P)	30	23	6	1	83	22	3.773	52	Promotion to Premier Division
2	Beckenham Town (P)	30	20	7	3	63	19	3.316	47	Promotion to Premier Division
3	London Borough Of Greenwich	30	19	4	7	77	44	1.750	42	
4	Wandsworth	30	16	5	9	61	34	1.794	37	
5	Bexley	30	11	13	6	52	35	1.486	35	
6	Amersham Town (P)	30	12	11	7	41	32	1.281	35	Promotion to Premier Division
7	Hatfield Town (P)	30	13	8	9	62	46	1.348	34	Promotion to Premier Division
8	Crown & Manor	30	9	9	12	37	45	0.822	27	
9	Policrom	30	8	11	11	42	53	0.792	27	
10	Brent	30	9	8	13	40	49	0.816	26	
11	East Thurrock United (P)	30	9	7	14	36	45	0.800	25	Promotion to Premier Division
12	Thames Polytechnic	30	7	6	17	33	54	0.611	20	
13	Penhill Standard	30	7	6	17	38	71	0.535	20	
14	Virginia Water	30	5	9	16	37	74	0.500	19	
15	Royal Arsenal S & R A	30	7	4	19	43	80	0.538	18	
16	Highfield	30	4	8	18	31	73	0.425	16	

(C) Champions; (P) Promoted
