= 1977–78 Isthmian League =

The 1977–78 season was the 63rd season of the Isthmian League, an English football competition.

At the end of the previous season league divisions were renamed: Division One was renamed the Premier Division and Division Two was renamed Division One. Also, seventeen new clubs were newly admitted to the league, they were placed to the new Division Two, as the league expanded to three divisions.

Enfield won Premier Division, whilst Dulwich Hamlet won Division One and Epsom & Ewell won Division Two.

== Premier Division ==
Isthmian League Premier Division
- Season: 1977–78
- Champions: Enfield
- Relegated: Bishop's Stortford; Southall & Ealing Borough
- Matches: 462
- Goals: 1,297 (2.81 per match)

The Premier Division consisted of 22 clubs, including 20 clubs from the previous season and two new clubs, promoted from old Division Two:

- Boreham Wood
- Carshalton Athletic

=== League table ===
Pos	Team	Pld	W	D	L	GF	GA	GD	Pts	Relegation
1	Enfield	42	35	5	2	96	27	+69	110	
2	Dagenham	42	24	7	11	78	55	+23	79	
3	Wycombe Wanderers	42	22	9	11	66	41	+25	75	
4	Tooting & Mitcham United	42	22	8	12	64	49	+15	74	
5	Hitchin Town	42	20	9	13	69	53	+16	69	
6	Sutton United	42	18	12	12	66	57	+9	66	
7	Leatherhead	42	18	11	13	62	48	+14	65	
8	Croydon	42	18	10	14	61	52	+9	64	
9	Walthamstow Avenue	42	17	12	13	64	61	+3	63	
10	Barking	42	17	7	18	76	66	+10	58	
11	Carshalton Athletic	42	15	11	16	60	62	−2	56	
12	Hayes	42	15	11	16	46	53	−7	56	
13	Hendon	42	16	7	19	57	55	+2	55	
14	Woking	42	14	11	17	62	62	0	53	
15	Boreham Wood	42	15	8	19	48	65	−17	53	
16	Slough Town	42	14	8	20	52	69	−17	50	
17	Staines Town	42	12	13	17	46	60	−14	49	
18	Tilbury	42	11	12	19	57	68	−11	45	
19	Kingstonian	42	8	13	21	43	65	−22	37	
20	Leytonstone	42	7	15	20	44	71	−27	36	
21	Southall & Ealing Borough	42	6	15	21	43	74	−31	33	Relegated to Division One
22	Bishop's Stortford	42	7	8	27	36	83	−47	29	Relegated to Division One

Source: fchd.com rsssf.com
Rules for classification: 1) points; 2) goal difference; 3) number of goals scored.

=== Stadia and locations ===
Locations of the Premier Division clubs
Greater London Premier Division football clubs

Club	Stadium
Barking	Mayesbrook Park
Bishop's Stortford	Woodside Park
Boreham Wood	Meadow Park
Carshalton Athletic	War Memorial Sports Ground
Croydon	Croydon Sports Arena
Dagenham	Victoria Road
Enfield	Southbury Road
Hayes	Church Road
Hendon	Claremont Road
Hitchin Town	Top Field
Kingstonian	Kingsmeadow
Leatherhead	Fetcham Grove
Leytonstone	Granleigh Road
Slough Town	Wexham Park
Southall & Ealing Borough	Robert Parker Stadium
Staines Town	Wheatsheaf Park
Sutton United	Gander Green Lane
Tilbury	Chadfields
Tooting & Mitcham United	Imperial Fields
Walthamstow Avenue	Green Pond Road
Woking	The Laithwaite Community Stadium
Wycombe Wanderers	Adams Park

== Division One ==
Isthmian League Division One
- Season: 1977–78
- Champions: Dulwich Hamlet
- Promoted: Dulwich Hamlet; Oxford City
- Relegated: Corinthian-Casuals; Hornchurch
- Matches: 462
- Goals: 1,326 (2.87 per match)

Division One consisted of 22 clubs, including 20 clubs from the previous season and two new clubs, relegated from old Division One:

- Dulwich Hamlet
- Ilford

=== League table ===
Pos	Team	Pld	W	D	L	GF	GA	GD	Pts	Promotion or relegation
1	Dulwich Hamlet	42	28	9	5	91	25	+66	93	Promoted to the Premier Division
2	Oxford City	42	26	5	11	85	44	+41	83	Promoted to the Premier Division
3	Bromley	42	23	13	6	74	41	+33	82	
4	Walton & Hersham	42	22	11	9	69	41	+28	77	
5	Ilford	42	21	14	7	57	47	+10	77	
6	St Albans City	42	22	10	10	83	46	+37	76	
7	Wokingham Town	42	19	12	11	68	48	+20	69	
8	Harlow Town	42	19	8	15	63	49	+14	65	
9	Harrow Borough	42	17	10	15	59	54	+5	61	
10	Maidenhead United	42	16	13	13	55	54	+1	61	
11	Hertford Town	42	15	14	13	57	51	+6	59	
12	Chesham United	42	14	13	15	69	70	−1	55	
13	Hampton	42	13	13	16	49	53	−4	52	
14	Harwich & Parkeston	42	12	13	17	68	79	−11	49	
15	Wembley	42	15	3	24	56	82	−26	48	
16	Horsham	42	12	10	20	41	57	−16	46	
17	Finchley	42	11	13	18	41	68	−27	46	
18	Aveley	42	13	7	22	47	75	−28	46	
19	Ware	42	8	13	21	61	95	−34	37	
20	Clapton	42	10	6	26	46	78	−32	36	
21	Hornchurch	42	8	10	24	47	81	−34	34	Relegated to Division Two
22	Corinthian-Casuals	42	3	10	29	40	88	−48	19	Relegated to Division Two

Source: fchd.com rsssf.com
Rules for classification: 1) points; 2) goal difference; 3) number of goals scored.

=== Stadia and locations ===
Locations of the Division One clubs
Greater London Division One football clubs

Club	Stadium
Aveley	The Mill Field
Bromley	Hayes Lane
Chesham United	The Meadow
Clapton	The Old Spotted Dog Ground
Corinthian-Casuals	King George's Field
Dulwich Hamlet	Champion Hill
Finchley	Summers Lane
Hampton	Beveree Stadium
Harlow Town	Harlow Sportcentre
Harrow Borough	Earlsmead Stadium
Harwich & Parkeston	Royal Oak
Hertford Town	Hertingfordbury Park
Hornchurch	Hornchurch Stadium
Horsham	Queen Street
Ilford	Victoria Road
Maidenhead United	York Road
Oxford City	Marsh Lane
St Albans City	Clarence Park
Walton & Hersham	The Sports Ground
Ware	Wodson Park
Wembley	Vale Farm
Wokingham Town	Cantley Park

== Division Two ==
Isthmian League Division Two
- Season: 1977–78
- Champions: Epsom & Ewell
- Promoted: Epsom & Ewell; Metropolitan Police
- Matches: 272
- Goals: 801 (2.94 per match)

The 1977–78 season was first for new Division Two. The Division consisted of 16 clubs transferred from the Athenian League and one club (Metropolitan Police) transferred from the Southern Football League Division One South.

=== League table ===
Pos	Team	Pld	W	D	L	GF	GA	GD	Pts	Promotion
1	Epsom & Ewell	32	21	5	6	65	34	+31	68	Promoted to Division One
2	Metropolitan Police	32	19	6	7	53	30	+23	63	Promoted to Division One
3	Farnborough Town	32	19	4	9	68	40	+28	61	
4	Molesey	32	17	8	7	47	27	+20	59	
5	Egham Town	32	15	9	8	52	34	+18	54	
6	Tring Town	32	14	11	7	62	32	+30	53	
7	Letchworth Garden City	32	14	11	7	67	48	+19	53	
8	Lewes	32	13	7	12	52	51	+1	46	
9	Rainham Town	32	13	6	13	42	50	−8	45	
10	Worthing	32	11	9	12	40	45	−5	42	
11	Eastbourne United	32	10	8	14	40	50	−10	38	
12	Cheshunt	32	9	6	17	43	60	−17	33	
13	Feltham	32	7	9	16	30	49	−19	30	
14	Camberley Town	32	6	11	15	32	49	−17	29	
15	Hemel Hempstead	32	6	9	17	33	50	−17	27	
16	Epping Town	32	7	6	19	37	64	−27	27	
17	Willesden	32	7	3	22	38	88	−50	24	

Source: fchd.com rsssf.com
Rules for classification: 1) points; 2) goal difference; 3) number of goals scored.

=== Stadia and locations ===
Locations of the Division Two clubs
Greater London Division Two football clubs

Club	Stadium
Camberley Town	Kroomer Park
Cheshunt	Cheshunt Stadium
Eastbourne United	The Oval
Egham Town	The Runnymede Stadium
Epping Town	Stonards Hill
Epsom & Ewell	Merland Rise
Farnborough Town	Cherrywood Road
Feltham	The Orchard
Hemel Hempstead	Vauxhall Road
Letchworth Garden City	Baldock Road
Lewes	The Dripping Pan
Metropolitan Police	Imber Court
Molesey	Walton Road Stadium
Rainham Town	Deri Park
Tring Town	Pendley Ground
Willesden	King Edwards Park
Worthing	Woodside Road
