= 1978–79 Isthmian League =

The 1978–79 season was the 64th season of the Isthmian League, an English football competition.

At the end of the season Alliance Premier League was created. As a result of it, Isthmian League teams lost possibility to take part in the elections to the Football League as only highest placed team from Alliance Premier League who met the Football League requirements may apply. The Isthmian League refused to participate in the formation of the new league.

== Premier Division ==
Isthmian League Premier Division
- Season: 1978–79
- Champions: Barking
- Relegated: Kingstonian; Leytonstone
- Matches: 462
- Goals: 1,284 (2.78 per match)

The Premier Division consisted of 22 clubs, including 20 clubs from the previous season and two new clubs, promoted from Division One:

- Dulwich Hamlet
- Oxford City

This season was the last one when Isthmian League clubs may have applied for election to the Football League. Though, no clubs participated in the elections.

=== League table ===
Pos	Team	Pld	W	D	L	GF	GA	GD	Pts	Relegation
1	Barking	42	28	9	5	92	50	+42	93	
2	Dagenham	42	25	6	11	83	63	+20	81	
3	Enfield	42	22	11	9	69	37	+32	77	
4	Dulwich Hamlet	42	21	13	8	69	39	+30	76	
5	Slough Town	42	20	12	10	61	44	+17	72	
6	Wycombe Wanderers	42	20	9	13	59	44	+15	69	
7	Woking	42	18	14	10	79	59	+20	68	
8	Croydon	42	19	9	14	61	51	+10	66	
9	Hendon	42	16	14	12	55	48	+7	62	
10	Leatherhead	42	17	9	16	57	45	+12	60	
11	Sutton United	42	17	9	16	62	51	+11	60	
12	Tooting & Mitcham United	42	15	14	13	52	52	0	59	
13	Walthamstow Avenue	42	15	6	21	61	69	−8	51	
14	Tilbury	42	13	11	18	60	76	−16	50	
15	Boreham Wood	42	13	10	19	50	67	−17	49	
16	Hitchin Town	42	12	11	19	59	71	−12	47	
17	Carshalton Athletic	42	10	16	16	49	69	−20	46	
18	Hayes	42	9	18	15	45	58	−13	45	
19	Oxford City	42	12	7	23	50	80	−30	43	
20	Staines Town	42	6	16	20	40	64	−24	34	
21	Leytonstone	42	8	7	27	36	75	−39	31 (Note: Leytonstone merged with Ilford at the end of the season.)	Relegated to Division One
22	Kingstonian	42	3	15	24	35	72	−37	24	Relegated to Division One

Source: fchd.com rsssf.com
Rules for classification: 1) points; 2) goal difference; 3) number of goals scored.

=== Stadia and locations ===
Locations of the Premier Division clubs
Greater London Premier Division football clubs

Club	Stadium
Barking	Mayesbrook Park
Boreham Wood	Meadow Park
Carshalton Athletic	War Memorial Sports Ground
Croydon	Croydon Sports Arena
Dagenham	Victoria Road
Dulwich Hamlet	Champion Hill
Enfield	Southbury Road
Hayes	Church Road
Hendon	Claremont Road
Hitchin Town	Top Field
Kingstonian	Kingsmeadow
Leatherhead	Fetcham Grove
Leytonstone	Granleigh Road
Oxford City	Marsh Lane
Slough Town	Wexham Park
Staines Town	Wheatsheaf Park
Sutton United	Gander Green Lane
Tilbury	Chadfields
Tooting & Mitcham United	Imperial Fields
Walthamstow Avenue	Green Pond Road
Woking	The Laithwaite Community Stadium
Wycombe Wanderers	Adams Park

== Division One ==
Isthmian League Division One
- Season: 1978–79
- Champions: Harlow Town
- Promoted: Harlow Town; Harrow Borough
- Relegated: Southall & Ealing Borough
- Matches: 462
- Goals: 1,353 (2.93 per match)

Division One consisted of 22 clubs, including 18 clubs from the previous season and four new clubs:

Two clubs relegated from the Premier Division:

- Bishop's Stortford
- Southall & Ealing Borough

Two clubs promoted from Division Two:

- Epsom & Ewell
- Metropolitan Police

At the end of the season Leytonstone, relegated from the Premier Division, merged with Ilford to form Leytonstone & Ilford. Subsequently, St Albans City were given a reprieve.

=== League table ===
Pos	Team	Pld	W	D	L	GF	GA	GD	Pts	Promotion or relegation
1	Harlow Town	42	31	7	4	93	32	+61	100	Promoted to the Premier Division
2	Harrow Borough	42	26	8	8	85	49	+36	86	Promoted to the Premier Division
3	Maidenhead United	42	25	6	11	72	50	+22	81	
4	Bishop's Stortford	42	22	11	9	68	40	+28	77	
5	Hertford Town	42	21	11	10	62	41	+21	74	
6	Horsham	42	22	8	12	62	47	+15	74	
7	Harwich & Parkeston	42	22	5	15	90	57	+33	71	
8	Bromley	42	18	12	12	76	50	+26	66	
9	Hampton	42	17	11	14	59	47	+12	62	
10	Epsom & Ewell	42	18	7	17	69	57	+12	61	
11	Wembley	42	15	14	13	57	50	+7	59	
12	Aveley	42	17	7	18	57	66	−9	58	
13	Wokingham Town	42	17	8	17	64	68	−4	56 (Note: Wokingham Town were deducted three points.)	
14	Clapton	42	15	8	19	67	80	−13	53	
15	Metropolitan Police	42	12	13	17	58	55	+3	49	
16	Walton & Hersham	42	12	9	21	47	71	−24	45	
17	Ilford	42	13	5	24	48	80	−32	44 (Note: Ilford merged with Leytonstone at the end of the season. Thus, St Albans were reprieved.)	Merged into Leytonstone
18	Ware	42	11	10	21	46	69	−23	43	
19	Chesham United	42	11	9	22	46	66	−20	42	
20	Finchley	42	7	15	20	43	74	−31	36	
21	St Albans City	42	7	7	28	43	90	−47	28	Reprieved from relegation
22	Southall & Ealing Borough	42	5	5	32	41	114	−73	20	Relegated to Division Two

Source: fchd.com rsssf.com
Rules for classification: 1) points; 2) goal difference; 3) number of goals scored.

=== Stadia and locations ===
Locations of the Division One clubs
Greater London Division One football clubs

Club	Stadium
Aveley	The Mill Field
Bishop's Stortford	Woodside Park
Bromley	Hayes Lane
Chesham United	The Meadow
Clapton	The Old Spotted Dog Ground
Epsom & Ewell	Merland Rise
Finchley	Summers Lane
Hampton	Beveree Stadium
Harlow Town	Harlow Sportcentre
Harrow Borough	Earlsmead Stadium
Harwich & Parkeston	Royal Oak
Hertford Town	Hertingfordbury Park
Horsham	Queen Street
Ilford	Victoria Road
Maidenhead United	York Road
Metropolitan Police	Imber Court
Southall & Ealing Borough	Robert Parker Stadium
St Albans City	Clarence Park
Walton & Hersham	The Sports Ground
Ware	Wodson Park
Wembley	Vale Farm
Wokingham Town	Cantley Park

== Division Two ==
Isthmian League Division Two
- Season: 1978–79
- Champions: Farnborough Town
- Promoted: Camberley Town; Farnborough Town
- Matches: 306
- Goals: 871 (2.85 per match)

Division Two consisted of 18 clubs, including 15 clubs from the previous season and three new clubs:

- Corinthian-Casuals, relegated from Division One
- Hornchurch, relegated from Division One
- Hungerford Town, joined from the Hellenic Football League

=== League table ===
Pos	Team	Pld	W	D	L	GF	GA	GD	Pts	Promotion
1	Farnborough Town	34	26	3	5	77	34	+43	81	Promoted to Division One
2	Camberley Town	34	21	8	5	71	32	+39	71	Promoted to Division One
3	Molesey	34	19	11	4	55	33	+22	68	
4	Lewes	34	19	6	9	66	50	+16	63	
5	Feltham	34	16	7	11	47	36	+11	55	
6	Letchworth Garden City	34	14	10	10	56	48	+8	52	
7	Eastbourne United	34	16	4	14	47	46	+1	52	
8	Hemel Hempstead	34	13	11	10	46	37	+9	50	
9	Epping Town	34	14	7	13	49	44	+5	49	
10	Rainham Town	34	13	10	11	42	41	+1	49	
11	Cheshunt	34	11	8	15	43	49	−6	41	
12	Hungerford Town	34	11	8	15	48	58	−10	41	
13	Worthing	34	9	8	17	40	50	−10	35	
14	Hornchurch	34	9	8	17	38	61	−23	35	
15	Egham Town	34	7	12	15	49	54	−5	33	
16	Tring Town	34	6	8	20	33	56	−23	26	
17	Willesden	34	6	8	20	41	77	−36	26	
18	Corinthian-Casuals	34	4	7	23	23	65	−42	19	

Source: fchd.com rsssf.com
Rules for classification: 1) points; 2) goal difference; 3) number of goals scored.

=== Stadia and locations ===
Locations of the Division Two clubs
Greater London Division Two football clubs

Club	Stadium
Camberley Town	Kroomer Park
Cheshunt	Cheshunt Stadium
Corinthian-Casuals	King George's Field
Eastbourne United	The Oval
Egham Town	The Runnymede Stadium
Epping Town	Stonards Hill
Farnborough Town	Cherrywood Road
Feltham	The Orchard
Hemel Hempstead	Vauxhall Road
Hornchurch	Hornchurch Stadium
Hungerford Town	Bulpit Lane
Letchworth Garden City	Baldock Road
Lewes	The Dripping Pan
Molesey	Walton Road Stadium
Rainham Town	Deri Park
Tring Town	Pendley Ground
Willesden	King Edwards Park
Worthing	Woodside Road
