= 1979–80 Isthmian League =

The 1979–80 season was the 65th season of the Isthmian League, an English football competition.

At the end of the previous season Alliance Premier League was created. As a result of it, Isthmian League clubs lost possibility to take part in the elections to the Football League as only highest placed club from Alliance Premier League who met the Football League requirements may apply. Isthmian League refused to participate in the formation of the new league. There was no promotion from the Isthmian League to the Alliance Premier League till 1985.

== Premier Division ==
Isthmian League Premier Division
- Season: 1979–80
- Champions: Enfield
- Relegated: Oxford City; Tilbury
- Matches: 462
- Goals: 1,320 (2.86 per match)

The Premier Division consisted of 22 clubs, including 20 clubs from the previous season and two new clubs, promoted from Division One:

- Harlow Town
- Harrow Borough

=== League table ===
Pos	Team	Pld	W	D	L	GF	GA	GD	Pts	Relegation
1	Enfield	42	25	9	8	74	32	+42	84	
2	Walthamstow Avenue	42	24	9	9	87	48	+39	81	
3	Dulwich Hamlet	42	21	16	5	66	37	+29	79	
4	Sutton United	42	20	13	9	67	40	+27	73	
5	Dagenham	42	20	13	9	82	56	+26	73	
6	Tooting & Mitcham United	42	21	6	15	62	59	+3	69	
7	Barking	42	19	10	13	72	51	+21	67	
8	Harrow Borough	42	17	15	10	64	51	+13	66	
9	Woking	42	17	13	12	78	59	+19	64	
10	Wycombe Wanderers	42	17	13	12	72	53	+19	64	
11	Harlow Town	42	14	12	16	54	60	−6	54	
12	Hitchin Town	42	13	15	14	54	68	−14	54	
13	Hendon	42	12	13	17	50	57	−7	49	
14	Slough Town	42	13	10	19	54	71	−17	49	
15	Boreham Wood	42	13	10	19	50	69	−19	49	
16	Staines Town	42	14	6	22	46	67	−21	48	
17	Hayes	42	12	9	21	48	68	−20	45	
18	Leatherhead	42	11	11	20	51	60	−9	44	
19	Carshalton Athletic	42	12	7	23	48	78	−30	43	
20	Croydon	42	10	10	22	51	59	−8	40	
21	Oxford City	42	10	9	23	49	87	−38	39	Relegated to Division One
22	Tilbury	42	7	11	24	41	90	−49	30 (Note: Tilbury were deducted two points.)	Relegated to Division One

Source: fchd.com rsssf.com
Rules for classification: 1) points; 2) goal difference; 3) number of goals scored.

=== Stadia and locations ===
Locations of the Premier Division clubs
Greater London Premier Division football clubs

Club	Stadium
Barking	Mayesbrook Park
Boreham Wood	Meadow Park
Carshalton Athletic	War Memorial Sports Ground
Croydon	Croydon Sports Arena
Dagenham	Victoria Road
Dulwich Hamlet	Champion Hill
Enfield	Southbury Road
Harlow Town	Harlow Sportcentre
Harrow Borough	Earlsmead Stadium
Hayes	Church Road
Hendon	Claremont Road
Hitchin Town	Top Field
Leatherhead	Fetcham Grove
Oxford City	Marsh Lane
Slough Town	Wexham Park
Staines Town	Wheatsheaf Park
Sutton United	Gander Green Lane
Tilbury	Chadfields
Tooting & Mitcham United	Imperial Fields
Walthamstow Avenue	Green Pond Road
Woking	The Laithwaite Community Stadium
Wycombe Wanderers	Adams Park

== Division One ==
Isthmian League Division One
- Season: 1979–80
- Champions: Leytonstone & Ilford
- Promoted: Bromley; Leytonstone & Ilford
- Relegated: Harwich & Parkeston; Horsham
- Matches: 462
- Goals: 1,282 (2.77 per match)

Division One consisted of 22 clubs, including 18 clubs from the previous season and three new clubs:

One club relegated from the Premier Division:

- Kingstonian

Leytonstone also relegated from the Premier Division at the end of the previous season, merged with Ilford to create the new club Leytonstone & Ilford, thus, St Albans City were reprieved.

Two clubs promoted from Division Two:

- Camberley Town
- Farnborough Town

=== League table ===
Pos	Team	Pld	W	D	L	GF	GA	GD	Pts	Promotion or relegation
1	Leytonstone & Ilford	42	31	6	5	83	35	+48	99	Promoted to the Premier Division
2	Bromley	42	24	10	8	93	44	+49	82	Promoted to the Premier Division
3	Maidenhead United	42	24	8	10	81	46	+35	80	
4	Bishop's Stortford	42	24	8	10	74	47	+27	80	
5	Kingstonian	42	22	8	12	59	44	+15	74	
6	Chesham United	42	18	13	11	68	56	+12	67	
7	St Albans City	42	17	13	12	65	47	+18	64	
8	Farnborough Town	42	19	7	16	70	57	+13	64	
9	Epsom & Ewell	42	18	7	17	62	57	+5	61	
10	Camberley Town	42	16	10	16	43	38	+5	58	
11	Walton & Hersham	42	15	12	15	61	50	+11	57	
12	Wembley	42	16	8	18	46	52	−6	56	
13	Wokingham Town	42	14	11	17	45	49	−4	53	
14	Hertford Town	42	13	11	18	71	74	−3	50	
15	Aveley	42	12	13	17	45	55	−10	49	
16	Hampton	42	14	7	21	57	74	−17	49	
17	Finchley	42	13	9	20	44	59	−15	48	
18	Metropolitan Police	42	13	8	21	46	67	−21	47	
19	Ware	42	11	12	19	45	61	−16	45	
20	Clapton	42	14	3	25	48	77	−29	45	
21	Harwich & Parkeston	42	11	6	25	51	84	−33	38 (Note: Harwich & Parkeston were deducted one point.)	Relegated to Division Two
22	Horsham	42	6	4	32	29	113	−84	22	Relegated to Division Two

Source: fchd.com rsssf.com
Rules for classification: 1) points; 2) goal difference; 3) number of goals scored.

=== Stadia and locations ===
Locations of the Division One clubs
Greater London Division One football clubs

Club	Stadium
Aveley	The Mill Field
Bishop's Stortford	Woodside Park
Bromley	Hayes Lane
Camberley Town	Kroomer Park
Chesham United	The Meadow
Clapton	The Old Spotted Dog Ground
Epsom & Ewell	Merland Rise
Farnborough Town	Cherrywood Road
Finchley	Summers Lane
Hampton	Beveree Stadium
Harwich & Parkeston	Royal Oak
Hertford Town	Hertingfordbury Park
Horsham	Queen Street
Kingstonian	Kingsmeadow
Leytonstone/Ilford	Victoria Road
Maidenhead United	York Road
Metropolitan Police	Imber Court
St Albans City	Clarence Park
Walton & Hersham	The Sports Ground
Ware	Wodson Park
Wembley	Vale Farm
Wokingham Town	Cantley Park

== Division Two ==
Isthmian League Division Two
- Season: 1979–80
- Champions: Billericay Town
- Promoted: Billericay Town; Lewes
- Matches: 342
- Goals: 1,024 (2.99 per match)

Second Division consisted of 19 clubs, including 16 clubs from the previous season and three new teams:

- Barton Rovers, joined from the South Midlands League
- Billericay Town, joined from the Athenian League
- Southall & Ealing Borough, relegated from Division One

Prior to the season Southall & Ealing Borough changed name to Southall.

=== League table ===
Pos	Team	Pld	W	D	L	GF	GA	GD	Pts	Promotion
1	Billericay Town	36	31	3	2	100	18	+82	96	Promoted to Division One
2	Lewes	36	24	7	5	82	33	+49	79	Promoted to Division One
3	Hungerford Town	36	21	8	7	77	35	+42	71	
4	Eastbourne United	36	21	6	9	77	45	+32	69	
5	Letchworth Garden City	36	21	6	9	63	32	+31	69	
6	Hornchurch	36	21	6	9	66	39	+27	69	
7	Molesey	36	15	9	12	67	60	+7	54	
8	Barton Rovers	36	15	7	14	49	49	0	52	
9	Worthing	36	14	9	13	58	54	+4	51	
10	Cheshunt	36	13	7	16	47	52	−5	46	
11	Rainham Town	36	12	7	17	54	65	−11	43	
12	Egham Town	36	11	9	16	47	53	−6	42	
13	Southall	36	11	6	19	43	69	−26	39	
14	Feltham	36	8	11	17	23	49	−26	35	
15	Tring Town	36	7	13	16	38	55	−17	34	
16	Epping Town	36	10	4	22	44	69	−25	34	
17	Willesden	36	9	6	21	32	83	−51	33	
18	Hemel Hempstead	36	4	9	23	33	72	−39	21	
19	Corinthian-Casuals	36	6	3	27	24	92	−68	21	

Source: fchd.com rsssf.com
Rules for classification: 1) points; 2) goal difference; 3) number of goals scored.

=== Stadia and locations ===
Locations of the Division Two clubs
Greater London Division Two football clubs

Club	Stadium
Barton Rovers	Sharpenhoe Road
Billericay Town	New Lodge
Cheshunt	Cheshunt Stadium
Corinthian-Casuals	King George's Field
Eastbourne United	The Oval
Egham Town	The Runnymede Stadium
Epping Town	Stonards Hill
Feltham	The Orchard
Hemel Hempstead	Vauxhall Road
Hornchurch	Hornchurch Stadium
Hungerford Town	Bulpit Lane
Letchworth Garden City	Baldock Road
Lewes	The Dripping Pan
Molesey	Walton Road Stadium
Rainham Town	Deri Park
Southall	Robert Parker Stadium
Tring Town	Pendley Ground
Willesden	King Edwards Park
Worthing	Woodside Road
