= 1974–75 Athenian League =

Athenian League
- Season: 1974–75

The 1974–75 Athenian League season was the 52nd in the history of Athenian League. The league consisted of 33 teams.

== Division One ==
Athenian League Division One
- Season: 1974–75
- Champions: Letchworth Town
- Promoted: Wembley; Hornchurch; Ware
- Relegated: Eastbourne United

The division featured three new teams, promoted from last season's Division Two:

- Alton Town (1st)
- Rainham Town (2nd)
- Leyton (3rd)

=== League table ===
Pos	Team	Pld	W	D	L	GF	GA	GR	Pts	Promotion or relegation
1	Letchworth Town (C)	34	21	7	6	63	32	1.969	49	
2	Wembley (P)	34	18	12	4	57	26	2.192	48	Promotion to Isthmian League Division Two
3	Grays Athletic	34	20	7	7	68	35	1.943	47	
4	Cheshunt	34	16	10	8	57	43	1.326	42	
5	Lewes	34	15	11	8	60	39	1.538	41	
6	Alton Town	34	15	10	9	59	42	1.405	40	
7	Hornchurch (P)	34	14	11	9	48	39	1.231	39	Promotion to Isthmian League Division Two
8	Ruislip Manor	34	13	9	12	42	43	0.977	35	
9	Erith & Belvedere	34	11	11	12	55	38	1.447	33	
10	Redhill	34	11	10	13	45	44	1.023	32	
11	Edmonton & Haringey	34	11	10	13	51	53	0.962	32	
12	Ware (P)	34	12	8	14	59	68	0.868	32	Promotion to Isthmian League Division Two
13	Marlow	34	9	12	13	33	50	0.660	30	
14	Rainham Town	34	10	9	15	39	47	0.830	29	
15	Hounslow	34	12	4	18	52	75	0.693	28	
16	Worthing	34	10	7	17	46	64	0.719	27	
17	Leyton	34	7	6	21	30	53	0.566	20	Merged with Wingate
18	Eastbourne United (R)	34	2	4	28	21	94	0.223	8	Relegation to Division Two

Source: rsssf.com
Rules for classification: 1) points; 2) goal difference; 3) number of goals scored.
(C) Champions; (P) Promoted; (R) Relegated

=== Stadia and locations ===
Locations of the Athenian League Division One clubs
Greater London Athenian League Division One football clubs

Club	Stadium
Alton Town	Anstey Park
Cheshunt	Cheshunt Stadium
Eastbourne United	The Oval
Erith & Belvedere	Park View
Grays Athletic	New Recreation Ground
Haringey Borough	Coles Park
Hornchurch	Hornchurch Stadium
Hounslow	Denbigh Road
Letchworth Garden City	Baldock Road
Lewes	The Dripping Pan
Leyton	Leyton Stadium
Marlow	Alfred Davis Memorial Ground
Rainham Town	Deri Park
Redhill	Kiln Brow
Ruislip Manor	Grosvenor Vale
Ware	Wodson Park
Wembley	Vale Farm
Worthing	Woodside Road

== Division Two ==
Athenian League Division Two
- Season: 1974–75
- Champions: Egham Town
- Promoted: Egham Town; Addlestone to Isthmian League: Harrow Borough
- Relegated: None

The division joined three new teams:

- Egham Town, from Spartan League
- Willesden, from Metropolitan–London League
- Epping Town, from Metropolitan–London League

=== League table ===
Pos	Team	Pld	W	D	L	GF	GA	GR	Pts	Promotion
1	Egham Town (C, P)	28	18	5	5	51	22	2.318	41	Promotion to Division One
2	Addlestone (P)	28	18	4	6	54	23	2.348	40	Promotion to Division One
3	Wingate	28	17	4	7	43	22	1.955	38	Merged with Leyton
4	Willesden	28	13	10	5	43	20	2.150	36	
5	Eastbourne Town	28	14	8	6	38	25	1.520	36	
6	Molesey	28	14	5	9	39	27	1.444	33	
7	Epping Town	28	12	4	12	43	38	1.132	28	
8	Uxbridge	28	8	11	9	31	31	1.000	27	
9	Harrow Borough (P)	28	11	5	12	35	37	0.946	27	Promotion to Isthmian League Division Two
10	Hemel Hempstead	28	8	7	13	29	36	0.806	23	
11	Aylesbury United	28	7	7	14	33	49	0.673	21	
12	Windsor & Eton	28	8	4	16	31	57	0.544	20	
13	Edgware	28	9	1	18	33	44	0.750	19	
14	Faversham Town	28	7	5	16	27	56	0.482	19	
15	Feltham	28	2	8	18	19	62	0.306	12	

Source: rsssf.com
Rules for classification: 1) points; 2) goal difference; 3) number of goals scored.
(C) Champions; (P) Promoted

=== Stadia and locations ===
Locations of the Athenian League Division Two clubs
Greater London Athenian League Division Two football clubs

Club	Stadium
Addlestone	Liberty Lane
Aylesbury United	Buckingham Road
Eastbourne Town	The Saffrons
Edgware	White Lion
Egham Town	The Runnymede Stadium
Epping Town	Stonards Hill
Faversham Town	Shepherd Neame Stadium
Feltham	The Orchard
Harrow Borough	Earlsmead Stadium
Hemel Hempstead	Vauxhall Road
Molesey	Walton Road Stadium
Uxbridge	Honeycroft
Willesden	King Edwards Park
Windsor & Eton	Stag Meadow
Wingate	Hall Lane
