= Greater London League =

- Founded: 1964
- First season: 1964–65
- Folded: 1971
- Country: England
- Divisions: One (1969–1970); Two (1964–1969, 1970–1971)
- Number of clubs: Lowest: 20 (1970–1971); Highest: 26 (1965–1967)
- Domestic cup: FA Cup
- Most championships: Canvey Island (2)

The Greater London League was a football league for clubs in and around London. It was formed in 1964 by a merger of the London League and the Aetolian League, after the two leagues had run a joint league cup the previous season due to both struggling for numbers.

== History ==
The league initially ran with A and B sections, before being divided into a Premier Division and First Division in 1965. In 1967 the divisions were renamed Division One and Division Two. A reduction in the number of clubs saw a single division formed for the 1969–70 season, and although it lost another club at the end of the season, it was split back into two sections the following season. At the end of the 1970–71 season it merged with the Metropolitan League (which had lost several clubs to the Southern League) to form the Metropolitan–London League.

== List of champions ==
Season	A Section	B Section
1964–65	Eton Manor	Sheppey United
Season	Premier Division	Division One
1965–66	Cray Wanderers	Highfield
1966–67	Epping Town	Battersea United
Season	Division One	Division Two
1967–68	Canvey Island	Willesden
1968–69	Canvey Island	Penhill Standard
Season	Champions	
1969–70	East Ham United	
Season	A Section	B Section
1970–71	Ford United	Ulysses

== Member clubs ==
Member clubs during the league's existence included:

- Barkingside
- Battersea United
- Beckenham Town
- Bexley
- Brentstonians
- BROB Barnet
- Canvey Island
- CAV Athletic
- Chertsey Town
- Chingford
- Cray Wanderers
- Crittall Athletic
- Crockenhill
- Deal Town
- East Ham United
- Epping Town
- Eton Manor
- Faversham Town
- Ford United
- Hatfield Town
- Heathside Sports
- Hermes
- Highfield
- London Transport
- Merton United
- Penhill Standard
- Northern Polytechnic
- Royal Arsenal Sports
- ROFSA
- Sheppey United
- Slade Green Athletic
- Snowdown Colliery Welfare
- Swanley Town
- Tunbridge Wells Rangers
- Ulysses
- Vokins
- West Thurrock Athletic
- Whitstable Town
- Willesden
- Woodford Town
- Woolwich Polytechnic

In addition, some clubs' first teams competed in the league's reserve section. These included:

- Alma United
- Basildon United
- British Ropes
- Brimsdown Rovers
- Crittall Sports
- East Thurrock United
- Eastley Athletic
- Green & Siley Weir
- Harold Hill
- Haringey Borough
- India & Millwall Dock
- J&E Hall Sports
- Muirhead Sports
- Pegasus
- Rolenmill
- Smiths Industries
- STC New Southgate
- Welwyn Garden City

== See also ==
- List of Greater London League seasons
