= 1975–76 Isthmian League =

The 1975–76 season was the 61st in the history of the Isthmian League, an English football competition.

It was the last Isthmian League season to use goal average as a tie-breaker.

Enfield won Division One, while Tilbury won Division Two.

== Division One ==
Isthmian League Division One
- Season: 1975–76
- Champions: Enfield
- Relegated: Clapton; Oxford City
- Matches: 462
- Goals: 1,239 (2.68 per match)

Division One featured 22 clubs, including 20 clubs from the previous season and two clubs, promoted from Division Two:

- Southall & Ealing Borough, who also changed name from Southall at the end of the previous season.
- Staines Town

=== League table ===
Pos	Team	Pld	W	D	L	GF	GA	GR	Pts	Relegation
1	Enfield	42	26	9	7	83	38	2.184	87	
2	Wycombe Wanderers	42	24	10	8	71	41	1.732	82	
3	Dagenham	42	25	6	11	89	55	1.618	81	
4	Ilford	42	22	10	10	58	39	1.487	76	
5	Dulwich Hamlet	42	22	5	15	67	41	1.634	71	
6	Hendon	42	20	11	11	60	41	1.463	71	
7	Tooting & Mitcham United	42	19	11	12	73	49	1.490	68	
8	Leatherhead	42	19	10	13	63	53	1.189	67	
9	Staines Town	42	19	9	14	46	37	1.243	66	
10	Slough Town	42	17	12	13	58	45	1.289	63	
11	Sutton United	42	17	11	14	71	60	1.183	62	
12	Bishop's Stortford	42	15	12	15	51	47	1.085	57	
13	Walthamstow Avenue	42	14	11	17	47	60	0.783	53	
14	Woking	42	14	9	19	58	62	0.935	51	
15	Barking	42	15	6	21	57	70	0.814	51	
16	Hitchin Town	42	13	11	18	45	57	0.789	50	
17	Hayes	42	10	19	13	44	48	0.917	49	
18	Kingstonian	42	13	8	21	53	87	0.609	47	
19	Southall & Ealing Borough	42	11	9	22	56	69	0.812	42	
20	Leytonstone	42	10	10	22	41	63	0.651	40	
21	Oxford City	42	9	8	25	29	65	0.446	35	Relegated to Division Two
22	Clapton	42	3	3	36	19	112	0.170	12	Relegated to Division Two

Source: fchd.com rsssf.com
Rules for classification: 1) points; 2) goal ratio.

=== Stadia and locations ===
Locations of the Division One clubs
Greater London Division One football clubs

Club	Stadium
Barking	Mayesbrook Park
Bishop's Stortford	Woodside Park
Clapton	The Old Spotted Dog Ground
Dagenham	Victoria Road
Dulwich Hamlet	Champion Hill
Enfield	Southbury Road
Hayes	Church Road
Hendon	Claremont Road
Hitchin Town	Top Field
Ilford	Victoria Road
Kingstonian	Kingsmeadow
Leatherhead	Fetcham Grove
Leytonstone	Granleigh Road
Oxford City	Marsh Lane
Slough Town	Wexham Park
Southall & Ealing Borough	Robert Parker Stadium
Staines Town	Wheatsheaf Park
Sutton United	Gander Green Lane
Tooting & Mitcham United	Imperial Fields
Walthamstow Avenue	Green Pond Road
Woking	The Laithwaite Community Stadium
Wycombe Wanderers	Adams Park

== Division Two ==
Isthmian League Division Two
- Season: 1975–76
- Champions: Tilbury
- Promoted: Croydon; Tilbury
- Matches: 462
- Goals: 1,326 (2.87 per match)

Division Two expanded up to 22 clubs, including 16 clubs from the previous season and six new clubs:

- Two clubs relegated from Division One:
  - Bromley
  - Walton & Hersham
- Four clubs transferred from the Athenian League:
  - Harrow Borough
  - Hornchurch
  - Ware
  - Wembley

=== League table ===
Pos	Team	Pld	W	D	L	GF	GA	GR	Pts	Promotion
1	Tilbury	42	32	6	4	97	30	3.233	102	Promoted to the Division One
2	Croydon	42	28	14	0	81	27	3.000	98	Promoted to the Division One
3	Carshalton Athletic	42	28	6	8	75	37	2.027	90	
4	Chesham United	42	21	12	9	91	51	1.784	75	
5	Harwich & Parkeston	42	21	11	10	78	56	1.393	74	
6	Hampton	42	21	9	12	72	52	1.385	72	
7	St Albans City	42	18	12	12	59	48	1.229	66	
8	Boreham Wood	42	17	12	13	68	50	1.360	63	
9	Harrow Borough	42	15	12	15	71	74	0.959	57	
10	Hornchurch	42	15	11	16	61	61	1.000	56	
11	Horsham	42	14	13	15	60	55	1.091	55	
12	Wembley	42	14	13	15	51	54	0.944	55	
13	Wokingham Town	42	13	16	13	45	52	0.865	55	
14	Walton & Hersham	42	14	12	16	61	56	1.089	54	
15	Finchley	42	14	11	17	52	53	0.981	53	
16	Bromley	42	11	11	20	64	86	0.744	44	
17	Harlow Town	42	11	9	22	50	73	0.685	42	
18	Aveley	42	11	9	22	34	51	0.667	42	
19	Maidenhead United	42	6	17	19	32	65	0.492	35	
20	Ware	42	7	12	23	50	95	0.526	33	
21	Hertford Town	42	5	9	28	32	87	0.368	24	
22	Corinthian-Casuals	42	4	7	31	42	113	0.372	19	

Source: fchd.com rsssf.com
Rules for classification: 1) points; 2) goal ratio.

=== Stadia and locations ===
Locations of the Division Two clubs
Greater London Division Two football clubs

Club	Stadium
Aveley	The Mill Field
Boreham Wood	Meadow Park
Bromley	Hayes Lane
Carshalton Athletic	War Memorial Sports Ground
Chesham United	The Meadow
Corinthian-Casuals	King George's Field
Croydon	Croydon Sports Arena
Finchley	Summers Lane
Hampton	Beveree Stadium
Harlow Town	Harlow Sportcentre
Harrow Borough	Earlsmead Stadium
Harwich & Parkeston	Royal Oak
Hertford Town	Hertingfordbury Park
Hornchurch	Hornchurch Stadium
Horsham	Queen Street
Maidenhead United	York Road
St Albans City	Clarence Park
Tilbury	Chadfields
Walton & Hersham	The Sports Ground
Ware	Wodson Park
Wembley	Vale Farm
Wokingham Town	Cantley Park
