= 1976–77 Athenian League =

54th Athenian League season

Athenian League
- Season: 1976–77

The 1976–77 Athenian League season was the 54th in the history of Athenian League. The league consisted of 33 teams.

== Division One ==
Athenian League Division One
- Season: 1976–77
- Champions: Leyton-Wingate
- Promoted: 8 clubs to Isthmian League Division Two
- Relegated: None

The division featured two new teams, promoted from last season's Division Two:

- Epping Town (1st)
- Epsom & Ewell (2nd)

=== League table ===
Pos	Team	Pld	W	D	L	GF	GA	GR	Pts	Promotion or relegation
1	Leyton-Wingate (C)	34	22	6	6	65	26	2.500	50	
2	Letchworth Garden City (P)	34	21	7	6	66	33	2.000	49	Founder members of Isthmian League new Division Two
3	Addlestone	34	19	10	5	58	24	2.417	48	Transferred to Southern League Division One South
4	Lewes (P)	34	18	8	8	63	43	1.465	44	Founder members of Isthmian League new Division Two
5	Cheshunt (P)	34	18	8	8	57	39	1.462	44	Founder members of Isthmian League new Division Two
6	Epping Town (P)	34	17	8	9	54	37	1.459	42	Founder members of Isthmian League new Division Two
7	Alton Town	34	14	10	10	46	39	1.179	38	
8	Rainham Town (P)	34	12	13	9	63	56	1.125	37	Founder members of Isthmian League new Division Two
9	Egham Town (P)	34	14	7	13	46	45	1.022	35	Founder members of Isthmian League new Division Two
10	Epsom & Ewell (P)	34	12	9	13	46	42	1.095	33	Founder members of Isthmian League new Division Two
11	Redhill	34	12	9	13	43	43	1.000	33	
12	Haringey Borough	34	11	8	15	42	47	0.894	30	
13	Worthing (P)	34	9	9	16	47	59	0.797	27	Founder members of Isthmian League new Division Two
14	Hounslow	34	10	7	17	37	56	0.661	27	Transferred to Southern League Division One South
15	Erith & Belvedere	34	4	14	16	27	44	0.614	22	
16	Grays Athletic	34	6	10	18	38	63	0.603	22	
17	Marlow	34	5	8	21	42	90	0.467	18	
18	Ruislip Manor	34	4	5	25	33	87	0.379	13	

Source: rsssf.com
Rules for classification: 1) points; 2) goal difference; 3) number of goals scored.
(C) Champions; (P) Promoted

=== Stadia and locations ===
Locations of the Athenian League Division One clubs
Greater London Athenian League Division One football clubs

Club	Stadium
Addlestone	Liberty Lane
Alton Town	Anstey Park
Cheshunt	Cheshunt Stadium
Egham Town	The Runnymede Stadium
Epping Town	Stonards Hill
Epsom & Ewell	Merland Rise
Erith & Belvedere	Park View
Grays Athletic	New Recreation Ground
Haringey Borough	Coles Park
Hounslow	Denbigh Road
Letchworth Garden City	Baldock Road
Lewes	The Dripping Pan
Leyton-Wingate	Wadham Lodge
Marlow	Alfred Davis Memorial Ground
Rainham Town	Deri Park
Redhill	Kiln Brow
Ruislip Manor	Grosvenor Vale
Worthing	Woodside Road

== Division Two ==
Athenian League Division Two
- Season: 1976–77
- Champions: Farnborough Town
- Promoted: 8 clubs to Isthmian League Division Two; 7 clubs to Athenian League
- Relegated: None

The division joined four new teams:

- Farnborough Town, from London Spartan League Division One
- Chalfont St.Peter, from London Spartan League Division Two
- Kingsbury Town, from London Spartan League Division One
- Chertsey Town, from London Spartan League Division One

=== League table ===
Pos	Team	Pld	W	D	L	GF	GA	GR	Pts	Promotion
1	Farnborough Town (C, P)	28	19	5	4	65	33	1.970	43	Founder members of Isthmian League new Division Two
2	Tring Town (P)	28	16	8	4	49	30	1.633	40	Founder members of Isthmian League new Division Two
3	Molesey (P)	28	12	10	6	50	35	1.429	34	Founder members of Isthmian League new Division Two
4	Hemel Hempstead (P)	28	14	5	9	48	29	1.655	33	Founder members of Isthmian League new Division Two
5	Chalfont St.Peter (P)	28	13	7	8	41	28	1.464	33	Promotion to Athenian League
6	Harefield United (P)	28	8	13	7	45	35	1.286	29	Promotion to Athenian League
7	Uxbridge (P)	28	11	7	10	32	25	1.280	29	Promotion to Athenian League
8	Feltham (P)	28	11	7	10	34	40	0.850	29	Founder members of Isthmian League new Division Two
9	Edgware (P)	28	11	5	12	29	36	0.806	25 (Note: Edgware deducted 2 points.)	Promotion to Athenian League
10	Eastbourne United (P)	28	8	7	13	41	42	0.976	23	Founder members of Isthmian League new Division Two
11	Kingsbury Town (P)	28	9	5	14	28	38	0.737	23	Promotion to Athenian League
12	Camberley Town (P)	28	6	11	11	25	34	0.735	23	Founder members of Isthmian League new Division Two
13	Windsor & Eton (P)	28	5	11	12	34	42	0.810	21	Promotion to Athenian League
14	Willesden (P)	28	6	7	15	23	49	0.469	19	Founder members of Isthmian League new Division Two
15	Chertsey Town (P)	28	3	8	17	22	70	0.314	14	Promotion to Athenian League

Source: rsssf.com
Rules for classification: 1) points; 2) goal difference; 3) number of goals scored.
(C) Champions; (P) Promoted

=== Stadia and locations ===
Locations of the Athenian League Division Two clubs
Greater London Athenian League Division Two football clubs

Club	Stadium
Camberley Town	Kroomer Park
Chalfont St Peter	Mill Meadow
Chertsey Town	Alwyns Lane
Eastbourne United	The Oval
Edgware	White Lion
Farnborough Town	Cherrywood Road
Feltham	The Orchard
Harefield United	Preston Park
Hemel Hempstead	Vauxhall Road
Kingsbury Town	Avenue Park
Molesey	Walton Road Stadium
Tring Town	Pendley Ground
Uxbridge	Honeycroft
Willesden	King Edwards Park
Windsor & Eton	Stag Meadow
