= 1975–76 Essex Senior Football League =

The 1975–76 season was the fifth in the history of Essex Senior Football League, a football competition in England.

The league featured 13 clubs which competed in the league last season, along with two new clubs, joined from the Metropolitan–London League:

- Canvey Island
- Eton Manor

Billericay Town were champions for the second season in a row, winning their third Essex Senior League title.

== League table ==
Essex Senior Football League
- Season: 1975–76
- Champions: Billericay Town
- Matches played: 210
- Goals scored: 690 (3.29 per match)

Pos	Team	Pld	W	D	L	GF	GA	GD	Pts	Promotion or relegation
1	Billericay Town	28	23	3	2	84	23	+61	49	
2	Tiptree United	28	18	6	4	56	32	+24	42	
3	Basildon United	28	17	7	4	55	20	+35	41	
4	Bowers United	28	16	6	6	52	31	+21	38	
5	Witham Town	28	17	2	9	63	36	+27	36	
6	Brightlingsea United	28	11	9	8	45	35	+10	31	
7	Eton Manor	28	13	4	11	46	37	+9	30	
8	Ford United	28	12	6	10	45	42	+3	30	
9	Brentwood	28	10	6	12	48	44	+4	26	
10	Maldon Town	28	12	1	15	42	44	−2	25	
11	Canvey Island	28	8	5	15	30	45	−15	21	
12	Heybridge Swifts	28	8	2	18	42	59	−17	18	
13	Southend United 'A'	28	6	1	21	25	75	−50	13	Resigned from the league
14	Coggeshall Town	28	4	3	21	30	77	−47	11	
15	Stansted	28	3	3	22	27	90	−63	9	

Source: fchd
Rules for classification: 1) points; 2) goal difference; 3) number of goals scored.
