= 1974–75 Spartan League =

Spartan League
- Season: 1974–75

The 1974–75 Spartan League season was the 57th in the history of Spartan League. The league consisted of 16 teams.

== League table ==
Spartan League
- Season: 1974–75
- Champions: Farnborough Town
- Promoted: Harefield United; Camberley Town; Tring Town
- Relegated: Crown & Manor; Chalfont St. Peter; Frimley Green; Amersham Town

The division featured 16 teams, 15 from last season and 1 new team:

- Frimley Green, from Surrey Senior League

Pos	Team	Pld	W	D	L	GF	GA	GR	Pts	Promotion or relegation
1	Farnborough Town (C)	30	26	3	1	97	17	5.706	55	Joined London Spartan League Division One
2	Chertsey Town	30	21	5	4	77	32	2.406	47	Joined London Spartan League Division One
3	Harefield United (P)	30	20	4	6	66	24	2.750	44	Promotion to Athenian League Division Two
4	Hoddesdon Town	30	19	4	7	75	30	2.500	42	Joined London Spartan League Division One
5	Banstead Athletic	30	17	3	10	63	38	1.658	37	Joined London Spartan League Division One
6	Berkhamsted Town	30	16	5	9	55	40	1.375	37	Joined London Spartan League Division One
7	Bracknell Town	30	14	8	8	68	34	2.000	36	Joined London Spartan League Division One
8	Camberley Town (P)	30	13	6	11	61	51	1.196	32	Promotion to Athenian League Division Two
9	Kingsbury Town	30	11	8	11	49	38	1.289	30	Joined London Spartan League Division One
10	Tring Town (P)	30	9	6	15	34	48	0.708	24	Promotion to Athenian League Division Two
11	Farnham Town	30	8	7	15	43	54	0.796	23	Joined London Spartan League Division One
12	Rayners Lane	30	9	3	18	35	62	0.565	21	Left the league
13	Crown & Manor (R)	30	7	6	17	51	78	0.654	20	Joined London Spartan League Division Two
14	Chalfont St. Peter (R)	30	6	4	20	43	94	0.457	16	Joined London Spartan League Division Two
15	Frimley Green (R)	30	5	6	19	33	85	0.388	16	Joined London Spartan League Division Two
16	Amersham Town (R)	30	0	0	30	17	142	0.120	0	Joined London Spartan League Division Two

Rules for classification: 1) points; 2) goal ratio.
(C) Champions; (P) Promoted; (R) Relegated
