= Eton Manor F.C. =

Association football club in England

Eton Manor
- Full name: Eton Manor Football Club
- Nickname: The Braves
- Founded: 1901
- Dissolved: 2017
- Website: http://www.pitchero.com/clubs/etonmanorfc/
Home colours	Away colours

Eton Manor Football Club was a football club based in East London, England.

== History ==
The club was established in 1901 as a sports club for the youth of the East End of London, part of the Eton Mission, and were based at Riseholme Street in Hackney Wick. After playing in local leagues, they joined Division One of the London League in 1933 and won the division at the first attempt, earning promotion to the Premier Division. In 1937–38 the club won the Premier Division title and reached the final of the Essex Senior Cup, in which they drew 0–0 with Romford, before losing the replay 3–1.

After World War II the London League resumed in 1945 with Eton Manor placed in the Eastern Division, before becoming members of the Premier Division for the 1946–47 season. They were runners-up in 1948–49 and won back-to-back Premier Division titles in 1952–53 and 1953–54. A fourth Premier Division title followed in 1955–56 and the club were runners-up in 1957–58.

In 1959 Eton Manor were founder members of the Aetolian League, joining Division One. When this merged with the London League to form the Greater London League in 1964, the club were placed in the 'A' section, which they won in its inaugural season, earning a place in the league's Premier Division for the 1965–66 season. They were runners-up in 1966–67 and 1967–68, and after the league split into two divisions in 1970, they finished as runners-up in the Premier Division 'B' section in 1970–71.

In 1971 the Greater London League merged with the Metropolitan League to form the Metropolitan–London League, with Eton Manor placed in Division One. In 1975 Eton Manor joined the Essex Senior League, where they have remained since. In 2007–08 they won the Essex Senior League Cup, beating Concord Rangers 3–2 in the final.

Eton Manor withdrew their team from the Essex Senior League at the end of the 2016–17 season, but remained members of the league. Prior to 2017–18 season, the club were placed in Division One South of the Eastern Counties League, but later withdrew and were replaced by Brightlingsea Regent reserves.

== Ground ==
The club played at several different venues in their early years before settling at "The Wilderness" at Hackney Marshes. During the 1960s they played at Temple Mills in Ruckholt Lane, but moved to Walthamstow Avenue's Green Pond Road ground in 1968. In the 1990s, the club played at Roding Lane in Buckhurst Hill. During the 2016–17 season, the club were playing at Goffs Lane, groundsharing with Broxbourne Borough.

== Honours ==
- Essex Senior League
  - League Cup winners 2007–08
- London League
  - Premier Division champions 1937–38, 1952–53, 1953–54, 1955–56
  - Division One champions 1933–34
- Greater London League
  - 'A' Section champions 1964–65

== Records ==
- Best FA Cup performance: Fourth qualifying round, 1956–57
- Best FA Vase performance: Second round, 1975–76, 1976–77, 1977–78, 2004–05, 2006–07, 2007–08, 2010–11
- Record attendance: 600 vs Leyton Orient, friendly match

== See also ==
- Eton Manor F.C. players
- Eton Manor Boys' Club
