= West Thurrock Athletic F.C. =

West Thurrock Athletic
- Full name: West Thurrock Athletic Football Club
- Nickname(s): The Rocks
- Founded: 1946
- Dissolved: 1968
- Ground: Bay House Meadow, West Thurrock
- Final season; 1967–68: Greater London League, 9th of 14

West Thurrock Athletic Football Club was a football club based in West Thurrock, England.

== History ==
Founded in 1946, West Thurrock Athletic joined the South Essex League, joining the London League Division Two a year later. West Thurrock entered the 1947–48 FA Cup, reaching the first qualifying round, before losing 3–0 away to neighbours Grays Athletic. In 1950, the club won promotion to the Premier Division, winning it in 1952. In the 1962–63 season, West Thurrock finished runners-up in the London League. In 1964, the club became founder members of the Greater London League, playing in the system before folding at the end of the 1967–68 season.

== Ground ==
Initially, the club played at the West Thurrock Memorial Ground, before moving to Bay House Meadow on London Road in West Thurrock.

== Records ==
- Best FA Cup performance: First qualifying round, 1947–48
