= London Transport F.C. =

London Transport
- Full name: London Transport Football Club
- Founded: 1925
- Ground: Old Kenton Lane, Kingsbury

London Transport Football Club was a football club based in London, England.

== History ==
Founded in 1925, London Transport joined the London Business Houses League. In 1945, London Transport joined the London League. The following year, the club entered the FA Cup, losing 9–0 away to Barking in the extra preliminary round. In 1964, London Transport joined the Greater London League. London Transport performed poorly in their stint in the league, finishing bottom four seasons out of five in their respective division.

== Ground ==
During London Transport's stay in the Greater London League, the club played at Langley Park in Beckenham. The club later moved across London to play at Old Kenton Lane in Kingsbury.

== Records ==
- Best FA Cup performance: Preliminary round, 1947–48
