= Metropolitan–London League =

- Founded: 1971
- First season: 1971–72
- Folded: 1975
- Country: England
- Divisions: One (1974–1975); Two (1971–1974)
- Number of clubs: Lowest: 20 (1974–1975); Highest: 25 (1971–1972)
- Domestic cup(s): FA Cup
- Most championships: Epping Town (2)

The Metropolitan–London League was a short-lived football league for clubs in and around London. It was formed in 1971 by a merger of the Greater London League and the Metropolitan League (which had lost several clubs to the Southern League). It ran with two divisions until 1974, reduced to one in 1974–75 season, after which it merged with the Spartan League to form the London Spartan League, which was later renamed the Spartan League. It merged with the South Midlands League in 1997 to form the modern Spartan South Midlands League

== List of champions ==
Season	Division One	Division Two
1971–72	Epping Town	Muirhead Sports
1972–73	Swanley	East Thurrock United
1973–74	Epping Town	Alma Swanley
Season	Champions	
1974–75	Cray Wanderers	

== Seasons ==
=== 1971–72 ===
==== Division One ====
The new Division One was composed of:

- Eight clubs from the Greater London League (BROB Barnet, Canvey Island, Chingford, Eton Manor, Ford United, Swanley, Ulysses and Willesden)
- Four clubs from the Metropolitan League (Cray Wanderers, Epping Town, Hatfield Town and Sheppey United)
- One club from the Kent League (Faversham Town)
- East Ham United

Pos	Team	Pld	W	D	L	GF	GA	GD	Pts	Notes
1	Epping Town	26	18	5	3	71	25	+46	41	
2	Faversham Town	26	15	5	6	54	30	+24	35	
3	East Ham United	26	14	6	6	59	37	+22	34	
4	Cray Wanderers	26	15	1	10	59	38	+21	31	
5	Ford United	26	12	6	8	47	35	+12	30	
6	Swanley	26	12	5	9	56	36	+20	29	
7	Eton Manor	26	10	8	8	45	44	+1	28	
8	Hatfield Town	26	11	5	10	50	51	−1	27	
9	Sheppey United	26	9	6	11	43	47	−4	24	Joined Kent League
10	Canvey Island	26	7	8	11	29	52	−23	22	
11	Willesden	26	6	8	12	35	51	−16	20	
12	Chingford	26	6	6	14	34	52	−18	18	
13	BROB Barnet	26	6	4	16	26	78	−52	16	
14	Ulysses	26	3	3	20	25	57	−32	9	

Source: Non-League Matters

==== Division Two ====
All clubs in Division Two except Muirhead Sports had come from the Greater London League. Woolwich Polytechnic were renamed Thames Polytechnic, Northern Polytechnic became Polytechnic of North London and Vokins became 279 Chislehurst.

Pos	Team	Pld	W	D	L	GF	GA	GD	Pts	Notes
1	Muirhead Sports	20	16	3	1	58	19	+39	35	
2	279 Chislehurst	20	13	5	2	63	28	+35	31	Left the league
3	Penhill Standard (P)	20	9	6	5	37	31	+6	24	Promoted to Division One
4	Highfield	20	9	4	7	45	28	+17	22	
5	Polytechnic of North London	20	8	3	9	36	41	−5	19	
6	Bexley	20	6	6	8	37	40	−3	18	
7	Thames Polytechnic	20	7	4	9	25	32	−7	18	
8	Brentstonians	20	6	6	8	27	43	−16	18	
9	Heathside Sports	20	7	3	10	35	44	−9	17	
10	Barkingside	20	5	4	11	36	46	−10	14	
11	RAS & RA	20	0	4	16	12	59	−47	4	

Source: Non-League Matters
(P) Promoted

=== 1972–73 ===
==== Division One ====
Division One featured one new club, Penhill Standard, who had been promoted from Division Two the previous season.

Pos	Team	Pld	W	D	L	GF	GA	GD	Pts	Notes
1	Swanley	26	18	6	2	57	26	+31	42	
2	Epping Town	26	16	6	4	54	22	+32	38	
3	Canvey Island	26	15	5	6	45	38	+7	35	
4	Cray Wanderers	26	16	2	8	46	28	+18	34	
5	Willesden	26	14	4	8	48	37	+11	32	
6	Hatfield Town	26	14	2	10	43	36	+7	30	
7	Faversham Town	26	12	4	10	44	31	+13	28	Promotion to Athenian League Division Two
8	East Ham United	26	11	4	11	60	43	+17	26	
9	Eton Manor	26	9	8	9	30	30	0	26	
10	Ford United	26	5	8	13	25	42	−17	18	
11	BROB Barnet	26	6	5	15	30	52	−22	17	
12	Ulysses	26	4	8	14	22	51	−29	16	
13	Chingford	26	4	4	18	24	52	−28	12	
14	Penhill Standard (R)	26	3	4	19	24	64	−40	10	Relegated to Division Two

Source: Non-League Matters
(R) Relegated

==== Division Two ====
Division Two featured one new club, East Thurrock United.

Pos	Team	Pld	W	D	L	GF	GA	GD	Pts	Notes
1	East Thurrock United (P)	18	11	5	2	36	12	+24	27	Promoted to Division One
2	Highfield (P)	18	11	4	3	37	17	+20	26	Promoted to Division One
3	Muirhead Sports	18	8	7	3	32	21	+11	23	
4	Heathside Sports	18	8	6	4	36	25	+11	22	
5	Polytechnic of North London	18	10	2	6	37	29	+8	22	
6	Bexley	18	6	3	9	34	38	−4	15	
7	RAS & RA	18	4	5	9	15	28	−13	13	
8	Barkingside	18	3	6	9	23	42	−19	12	
9	Thames Polytechnic	18	4	3	11	24	41	−17	11	
10	Brentstonians	18	3	3	12	17	38	−21	9	

Source: Non-League Matters
(P) Promoted

=== 1973–74 ===
==== Division One ====
Division One featured two new clubs, East Thurrock United and Highfield, both promoted from Division Two the previous season.

Pos	Team	Pld	W	D	L	GF	GA	GD	Pts	Notes
1	Epping Town	26	19	2	5	75	24	+51	40	Promotion to Athenian League Division Two
2	East Ham United	26	15	7	4	34	19	+15	37	
3	Eton Manor	26	13	7	6	41	25	+16	33	
4	Cray Wanderers	26	14	5	7	62	42	+20	33	
5	Canvey Island	26	13	6	7	40	29	+11	32	
6	Hatfield Town	26	12	7	7	45	42	+3	31	
7	Swanley Town	26	9	7	10	44	45	−1	25	
8	Willesden	26	11	2	13	46	45	+1	24	Promotion to Athenian League Division Two
9	Highfield	26	9	4	13	36	58	−22	22	
10	Chingford	26	5	9	12	30	48	−18	19	
11	East Thurrock United	26	7	4	15	39	52	−13	18	
12	Ford United	26	5	8	13	18	45	−27	18	Joined Essex Senior League
13	BROB Barnet	26	4	9	13	26	51	−25	17	
14	Ulysses	26	5	5	16	23	39	−16	15	

Source: Non-League Matters

==== Division Two ====
Division Two featured two new clubs:

- Alma Swanley
- Penhill Standard (relegated from Division One)

Pos	Team	Pld	W	D	L	GF	GA	GD	Pts	Notes
1	Alma Swanley (P)	18	15	3	0	51	14	+37	33	Promotion to Metropolitan–London League
2	Heathside Sports (P)	18	12	4	2	42	15	+27	28	Promotion to Metropolitan–London League
3	Muirhead Sports (P)	18	10	3	5	38	30	+8	23	Promotion to Metropolitan–London League
4	Penhill Standard (P)	18	7	6	5	32	25	+7	20	Promotion to Metropolitan–London League
5	Thames Polytechnic (P)	18	7	2	9	22	33	−11	16	Promotion to Metropolitan–London League
6	Polytechnic of North London	18	6	3	9	21	31	−10	15	Left the league
7	Bexley (P)	18	6	2	10	20	28	−8	14	Promotion to Metropolitan–London League
8	RAS & RA (P)	18	5	3	10	18	28	−10	13	Promotion to Metropolitan–London League
9	Barkingside (P)	18	4	2	12	20	38	−18	10	Promotion to Metropolitan–London League
10	Brentstonians (P)	18	2	4	12	16	38	−22	8	Promotion to Metropolitan–London League

Source: Non-League Matters
(P) Promoted

=== 1974–75 ===
Pos	Team	Pld	W	D	L	GF	GA	GD	Pts	Result
1	Cray Wanderers	38	32	4	2	128	36	+92	68	Joined London Spartan League Division One
2	Alma Swanley	38	26	7	5	91	41	+50	59	Joined London Spartan League Division One
3	Canvey Island	38	24	7	7	78	30	+48	55	Joined Essex Senior League
4	Swanley Town	38	23	6	9	81	40	+41	52	Joined London Spartan League Division One
5	Eton Manor	38	21	6	11	72	39	+33	48	Joined Essex Senior League
6	Penhill Standard	38	20	8	10	70	55	+15	48	Joined London Spartan League Division One
7	Hatfield Town	38	16	12	10	57	35	+22	44	Joined London Spartan League Division One
8	Chingford	38	19	6	13	62	44	+18	44	Joined London Spartan League Division One
9	Heathside Sports	38	16	10	12	54	41	+13	42	Joined London Spartan League Division One
10	East Ham United	38	14	13	11	57	39	+18	41	Joined London Spartan League Division One
11	Highfield (R)	38	13	10	15	47	58	−11	36	Joined London Spartan League Division Two
12	East Thurrock United (R)	38	14	6	18	58	64	−6	34	Joined London Spartan League Division Two
13	BROB Barnet (R)	38	12	7	19	46	61	−15	31	Joined London Spartan League Division Two
14	Muirhead Sports (R)	38	12	6	20	54	77	−23	30	Joined London Spartan League Division Two
15	Bexley (R)	38	9	11	18	46	88	−42	29	Joined London Spartan League Division Two
16	Barkingside (R)	38	8	8	22	45	80	−35	24	Joined London Spartan League Division Two
17	Thames Polytechnic (R)	38	7	9	22	33	82	−49	23	Joined London Spartan League Division Two
18	Ulysses (R)	38	4	14	20	40	72	−32	22	Joined London Spartan League Division Two
19	Brentstonians (R)	38	6	4	28	34	107	−73	16	Joined London Spartan League Division Two
20	RAS & RA (R)	38	3	8	27	42	106	−64	14	Joined London Spartan League Division Two

Source: Non-League Matters
(R) Relegated

== Member clubs ==
Member clubs during the league's existence included:

- 279 Chislehurst
- Alma Swanley
- Barkingside
- Bexley
- Brentstonians
- BROB Barnet
- Canvey Island
- Chingford
- Cray Wanderers
- East Ham United
- East Thurrock United
- Epping Town
- Eton Manor
- Faversham Town
- Ford United
- Hatfield Town
- Heathside Sports
- Highfield
- India & M Docks
- Muirhead Sports
- Penhill Standard
- Polytechnic of North London
- Rolenmill
- RAS & RA
- Sheppey United
- Swanley Town
- Thames Polytechnic
- Ulysses
- Welwyn Garden City
- Willesden
