= Metropolitan League =

- Founded: 1949
- First season: 1949–50
- Folded: 1971
- Country: England
- Divisions: One (1949–1963, 1964–1971); Two (1963–1964)
- Number of clubs: Lowest: 9 (1949–50); Highest: 22 (1964–65)
- Feeder to: Southern League
- Domestic cup(s): FA Cup
- League cup(s): League Cup; Professional Cup; Amateur Cup

The Metropolitan League was a football league in the south-east of England between 1949 and 1971.

== History ==
The league was founded in 1949 after several clubs learnt plans for a second division of the Southern League would come to nothing shortly before the start of the season, and was driven by Dagenham secretary Dave Thake, whose club were disappointed about being placed in the lower division of the London League. It was initially named the Home Counties League, but the name was rejected by the Football Association as the name was already in use. By the end of the league's inaugural season it had become known as the Metropolitan & District League, before being renamed the Metropolitan League in 1959. The league started with ten clubs and was largely composed of professional clubs or their reserve or youth teams, and was frequently described as an unofficial lower division of the Southern League. The league added a second division in 1963, but it ran for only a single season, which saw Gillingham Reserves win the title.

However, with the league reduced to only 12 clubs in 1970–71 and several of those about to leave to join the Southern League at the end of the season, the league merged with the Greater London League to form the Metropolitan–London League. This league ceased to exist in 1975 when it merged with the Spartan League to form the London Spartan League, which re-adopted the name Spartan League in 1987.

For three seasons an Amateur Cup was contested between the league's amateur teams; in 1951–52 and 1952–53 it was won by Windsor & Eton, whilst Vickers Armstrong (Surrey) won it in 1953–54. Thereafter it was awarded to the amateur team that finished highest in the league.

== Champions ==
Season	Champions	League Cup winners	Professional Cup winners
1949–50	St Neots & District	St Neots & District	Not held
1950–51	Dagenham	Headington United Reserves	Not held
1951–52	Horsham	Tottenham Hotspur 'A'	Tonbridge
1952–53	Tonbridge Reserves	Windsor & Eton	Tonbridge
1953–54	Headington United Reserves	Hastings United	Guildford City Reserves
1954–55	Chelsea 'A'	Chelsea 'A'	Chelsea 'A'
1955–56	Hastings United Reserves	Bedford Town Reserves	Hastings United Reserves
1956–57	Chelsea 'A'	Guildford City Reserves	Tonbridge Reserves
1957–58	Chelsea 'A'	West Ham United 'A'	Chelsea 'A'
1958–59	Arsenal 'A'	Crawley Town	Chelsea 'A'
1959–60	Luton Town 'A'	Eastbourne United & Headington United Reserves (joint)	West Ham United 'A'
1960–61	Arsenal 'A'	Arsenal 'A'	Arsenal 'A'
1961–62	Dartford Reserves	Dartford Reserves	Arsenal 'A'
1962–63	Arsenal 'A'	Bedford Town Reserves	Dartford Reserves
1963–64	Charlton Athletic 'A'	Tottenham Hotspur 'A'	Hastings United Reserves
1964–65	Gillingham Reserves	Tottenham Hotspur 'A'	St Neots Town
1965–66	Bury Town	Arsenal 'A'	Bury Town
1966–67	Tottenham Hotspur 'A'	Brentwood Town	West Ham United 'A'
1967–68	Chelmsford City Reserves	Bury Town	Chelmsford City Reserves
1968–69	Bury Town	Metropolitan Police	West Ham United 'A'
1969–70	Wellingborough Town	Braintree & Crittall Athletic	Stevenage Athletic
1970–71	Epping Town	Cray Wanderers	Bedford Town Reserves

== Member clubs ==
- Arsenal 'A'
- Ashford Town Reserves
- Barnet Reserves
- Bedford Town Reserves
- Bexley United Reserves
- Bletchley Town
- Braintree & Crittall Athletic
- Brentwood Town
- Brentwood Town Reserves
- Brighton & Hove Albion ‘A’
- Bury Town
- Callender's Athletic
- Cambridge City Reserves
- Canterbury City
- Canterbury City Reserves
- Charlton Athletic 'A'
- Chatham Town
- Chelmsford City Reserves
- Chelsea ‘A’
- Chertsey Town
- Chingford
- Chingford Town Reserves
- Chipperfield
- Crawley Town
- Crawley Town Reserves
- Cray Wanderers
- Croydon Rovers
- Dagenham
- Dartford Reserves
- Deal Town Reserves
- Dickinson (Apsley)
- Didcot Town
- Dover Reserves
- Dunstable Town
- Dunstable Town Reserves
- Eastbourne United
- Epping Town
- Folkestone Town Reserves
- Fulham ‘A’
- Gillingham Reserves
- Gravesend & Northfleet Reserves
- Guildford City Reserves
- Hammersmith United
- Hastings United Reserves
- Hatfield Town
- Haywards Heath
- Hillingdon Borough Reserves
- Horsham
- Hove United
- Kettering Town Reserves
- Leatherhead
- Luton Town 'A'
- Margate Reserves
- Metropolitan Police
- Millwall 'A'
- Newbury Town
- Oxford United 'A'
- Oxford United Reserves
- Rainham Town
- Ramsgate Athletic Reserves
- Romford Reserves
- Sheppey United
- Sittingbourne Reserves
- Skyways
- Southwick
- St Neots Town
- Stevenage Athletic
- Stevenage Town Reserves
- Tonbridge Reserves
- Tottenham Hotspur 'A'
- Twickenham
- Vickers Armstrong (Surrey)
- Wellingborough Town
- West Ham United 'A'
- Wimbledon Reserves
- Windsor & Eton
- Wokingham Town
- Woodford Town

== See also ==
- List of Metropolitan League seasons
