= Tilbury F.C. =

English football club

Coordinates: 51°28′12″N 0°21′48″E

Tilbury
- Full name: Tilbury Football Club
- Nickname: The Dockers
- Founded: 1889
- Ground: Chadfields, Tilbury
- Capacity: 4,000 (350 seated)
- Chairman: Daniel Nash
- Manager: George Christou
- League: Isthmian League North Division
- 2025–26: Isthmian League North Division, 11th of 22
- Website: https://tilburyfc.co.uk
Home colours	Away colours

Tilbury Football Club is a football club based in Tilbury, Thurrock, England. The club play in black and white stripes, are currently members of the Isthmian League North Division and play home matches at Chadfields.

== History ==
The club was established in 1889 by workers from Tilbury Docks. They joined the Gravesend League, later becoming members of the Grays & District League and then the Romford & District League. After returning to the Grays & District League, the club were league champions in 1901–02, 1902–03, 1906–07 and 1907–08. In 1903 they had also started playing in the South Essex League; the club were Division Two champions in the South Essex League in 1921–22, and went on to win the league championship in 1922–23 and 1924–25. After finishing as runners-up in the league in 1926–27, they moved up to Division One of the Kent League.

In 1931 Tilbury transferred to the Premier Division of the London League. At the start of World War II, the club joined the South Essex Combination, but temporarily disbanded at the end of the 1939–40 season after their ground was commandeered by the army. Upon resuming play at the end of the war, they were Premier Division runners-up in 1946–47 and 1947–48, and again in 1949–50, a season that saw the club reach the first round proper of the FA Cup for the first time after playing nine qualifying matches. Drawn away to Third Division South club Notts County in the first round, they lost 4–0. The club then switched to the Corinthian League, in which they played for seven seasons before returning to the London League in 1957. They were London League champions and League Cup winners in 1958–59 and went on to retain the title for the next three seasons, as well as winning the League Cup again in 1960–61 and 1961–62. After their fourth title win, the club joined the Delphian League but the 1962–63 league season had to be abandoned due to extensive adverse weather conditions and the league then folded, leading to the club (and most of the rest of the Delphian League) becoming members of the new Division Two of the Athenian League.

Tilbury won the Division Two title at the first attempt, earning promotion to Division One. They went on to win the Division One title in 1968–69 and were promoted to the Premier Division. Following a third-place finish in the Premier Division in 1972–73, the club joined the newly formed Division Two of the Isthmian League. They won the division in 1975–76 and were promoted to Division One, which was renamed the Premier Division in 1977. In 1977–78 the club reached the FA Cup first round again; after defeating Kettering Town 3–2 in a second replay (the first match was declared null and void as Kettering had used an ineligible player), they went on to beat Nuneaton Borough 2–1 in the second round, before being drawn away to Second Division Stoke City in the third round, a match they lost 4–0.

In 1979–80 Tilbury finished bottom of the Isthmian League's Premier Division and were relegated to Division One. At the end of the 1986–87 season they were relegated to Division Two North, where they played until being transferred to Division Three in 1991 as a result of league reorganisation. The 1991–92 season saw the club finish third in Division Three, earning promotion to Division Two. Although they were relegated back to Division Three at the end of the 1997–98 season, another third-place finish in 1999–2000 saw the club promoted to Division Two again. League reorganisation led to the club being moved in to Division One North in 2002. They were subsequently transferred to Division One East of the Southern League for the 2004–05 season, in which they finished bottom of the table, resulting in relegation to the Essex Senior League.

Tilbury finished third in their first season in the Essex Senior League and were promoted back to Division One North of the Isthmian League. A third-place finish in Division One North in 2011–12 saw them qualify for the promotion play-offs, in which they lost 4–3 to Needham Market in the semi-finals. They finished bottom of the North Division in 2022–23 and were relegated back to the Essex Senior League. However, they won the Essex Senior League the following season to earn an immediate promotion back to the North Division of the Isthmian League.

== Ground ==
The club played on several different grounds in their early years, including the Green & Siley Weir ground, Daisy Field and at Tilbury Fort, before returning to the Green & Siley Weir ground in 1900. After World War I they moved to the Orient Field, a ground owned by one of the directors of Clapton Orient. During World War II the ground was commandeered by the Army for anti-aircraft guns being used to protect the docks.

After the war, the club were told that they could only return to the Orient Field if they agreed to become a feeder club for Orient. After refusing, the club moved to an adjacent site named Chadfields in 1947, which had previously been used as a greyhound racing track. In the first year at the new ground, a small grandstand was built on the east side and basic terracing was installed. The ground's record attendance of 5,500 was set for the FA Cup fourth qualifying round match against Gorleston that the club won to set up their first round tie with Notts County in the 1949–50 season. The money raised from the cup run, together with the sale of Tom Scannell to Southend United, enabled the club to buy the site. A clubhouse was built in 1958 and floodlights were erected in 1966.

In 1970 the original grandstand was replaced with a two-level concrete stand with dressing rooms on the ground floor and a spectator area. Another seated stand was built on the west side of the pitch in 1996, replacing three separate covered areas and five steps of terracing. Hashtag United also played at Chadfields in 2019–20, with Brimsdown becoming tenants for 2020–21.

== Honours ==
- Isthmian League
  - Division Two champions 1975–76
  - League Cup winners 1974–75, 2008–09
- Essex Senior League
  - Champions 2023–24
- Athenian League
  - Division One champions 1968–69
  - Division Two champions 1963–64
- London League
  - Champions 1958–59, 1959–60, 1960–61, 1961–62
  - League Cup winners 1958–59, 1960–61, 1961–62
- South Essex League
  - Champions 1922–23, 1924–25
  - Division Two champions 1921–22
- Grays & District League
  - Champions 1901–02, 1902–03, 1906–07, 1907–08
- East Anglian Cup
  - Winners 2008–09
- Essex Elizabethan Trophy
  - Winners 1963–64
- Essex Junior Cup
  - Winners 1908–09, 1924–25
- Essex Professional Cup
  - Winners 1975–76
- Essex Senior Cup
  - Winners 1960–61, 1963–64, 1971–72, 1974–75
- Mithras Cup
  - Winners 1971–72, 1972–73, 1974–75, 1975–76, 1977–78

== Records ==
- Best FA Cup performance: Third round, 1977–78
- Best FA Amateur Cup performance: Quarter-finals, 1946–47
- Best FA Trophy performance: Third round, 1982–83
- Best FA Vase performance: Fifth round, 2023–24
- Most appearances: Nicky Smith, 424 (1975–1982)
- Most goals: Ross Livermore, 282
- Record attendance: 5,500 vs Gorleston, FA Cup fourth qualifying round replay, 1949
- Record transfer fee received: £2,000 from Dartford for Steve Connor, 1995; £2,000 from Grays Athletic for Tony Macklin, 1990

== See also ==
- Tilbury F.C. players
- Tilbury F.C. managers
