= Barkingside F.C. =

Association football club in England

Coordinates: 51°33′36″N 0°5′28″E

Barkingside
- Full name: Barkingside Football Club
- Nicknames: The 'Side, The Sky Blues
- Founded: 1898
- Ground: Cricklefield Stadium, Ilford
- Capacity: 3,500 (216 seated)
- Chairman: Jimmy Flanagan
- Manager: Michael Walther
- League: Essex Alliance Senior Division
- 2025–26: Eastern Counties League Division One South, 21st of 21 (relegated)
Home colours	Away colours

Barkingside Football Club is a football club based in Barkingside, Greater London, England. The club are currently members of the Essex Alliance Senior Division and groundshare with Ilford at the Cricklefield Stadium.

== History ==
The club was established in 1898 and joined the Ilford League. They won the league (jointly) after World War I, but folded due to a lack of support during the 1922–23 season. In 1925 the club was reformed as Barkingside Boys Guild, and initially played in the Ilford Minor League. They were soon renamed Barkingside Old Boys, before becoming simply Barkingside in the 1930s.

After World War II the club joined the South Essex League, finishing runners-up in their first season. The following season they switched to the Walthamstow League, also joining the Amateur Football Alliance. In 1950 they joined Division Two of the London League, and after finishing as runners-up in their first season, were promoted to Division One. The club won the Ilford Festival Cup and the Romford Charity Cup in 1952, and the London League Cup in 1956. The league was reduced to a single division in 1956, and when it gained another division in 1963, Barkingside were placed in the Premier Division. At the end of the season the league merged with the Aetolian League to form the Greater London League. The league had two sections, A and B, with Barkingside in the former.

After finishing tenth in the 1964–65 season, they were placed in Division One for the following season. The following season saw them finish second in Division One, earning promotion to the Premier Division. However, they were relegated in 1966–67 after finishing second-bottom of the division. The league was reduced to a single division for the 1969–70 season, but the following season saw it enlarged to three divisions, with Barkingside placed in Premier Division Section A.

In 1971 the Greater London League merged with the Metropolitan League to form the Metropolitan–London League, with Barkingside in Division Two. They remained in Division Two until the league was reduced to a single division in 1974, and at the end of the 1974–75, another league merger occurred, with the Metropolitan–London League merging with the Spartan League to form the London Spartan League; Barkingside were placed in Division Two of the new league. After finishing fourth in 1976–77, they were promoted to the (renamed) Premier Division. However, the following season saw them finish bottom of the Premier Division, resulting in relegation back to the Senior Division. They remained in the Senior Division until the end of the 1985–86 season, when a fifth-place finish saw them promoted to the Premier Division. In 1987 the league was renamed the Spartan League. The 1996–97 season saw Barkingside win the last Spartan League title, as the league merged with the South Midlands League at the end of the season to form the Spartan South Midlands League.

Barkingside were placed in the Premier Division South for the first season, and after finishing third, became members of the Premier Division for the following season, which saw them win the title. However, the club were denied promotion to the Isthmian League, and instead requested a transfer to the Essex Senior League. As a result of the FA ruling that sideways moves were not allowed within the pyramid, the club withdrew from senior football for one season and joined the Essex Senior League for the 2000–01 season. Their first season in the new league saw them win the Gordon Brastead Memorial Cup, and they went on to win the League Cup in 2008–09 and 2012–13. The latter season also saw them finish as runners-up, earning promotion to Division One North of the Isthmian League. However, after three seasons in which they finished in the bottom five on every occasion, they were relegated back to the Essex Senior League at the end of the 2015–16 season.

The 2018–19 season saw Barkingside finish second-from-bottom of the Essex Senior League, resulting in relegation to Division One South of the Eastern Counties League. They finished bottom of Division One South in 2025–26 and were relegated to the Senior Division of the Essex Alliance.

== Ground ==
The club initially played at a ground on Barkingside High Road opposite the State Cinema. They later played at Barkingside Recreation Ground, and after 25 years, moved to Station Road, located next to Barkingside tube station. Groundworks began in 1956 and involved removing World War II-era tank traps from the site. Banking was created on three sides, with plans to install terracing; the other side was to feature a 600-seat grandstand, giving the ground a capacity of 10,000. However, these plans never came to fruition and only a lean-to stand with a capacity of 100 was built. The ground was opened on 24 August 1957 with a London League match against Cray Wanderers.

A fire in the early 1970s forced the club to play its home fixtures at Woodford Avenue until the clubhouse was rebuilt and they could return to Station Road. A new stand was built in place of the lean-to in the late 1970s and floodlights were installed in 1989. A 250-seat stand was built on one side of the pitch, but was removed due to a lack of planning permissions. Prior to the start of the 1998–99 season the club came under the control of new owners and work then commenced on the ground, which was renamed Oakside Stadium, to bring it up to Isthmian League standard. During the 2001–02 season the lease at Oakside was sold on to Ford United, who needed to find a permanent home to allow their progression up the football pyramid.

In 2014 the club left Oakside after being told their rent would be increased, and began groundsharing at Ilford's Cricklefield Stadium.

== Honours ==
- Spartan South Midlands League
  - Champions 1998–99
- Essex Senior League
  - Gordon Brastead Memorial Cup winners 2000–01
  - League Cup winners 2008–09, 2012–13
- Spartan League
  - Premier Division champions 1996–97
- London League
  - League Cup winners 1955–56
- London Senior Cup
  - Winners 1996–97
- Ilford Festival Cup
  - Winners 1951–52
- Harry Sunderland Shield
  - Winners 1983–84

== Records ==
- Best FA Cup performance: Second qualifying round, 1998–99, 2007–08
- Best FA Trophy performance: Second qualifying round, 2014–15
- Best FA Vase performance: Third round, 1990–91, 1998–99
- Record attendance: 957 vs Arsenal reserves, London League, 1957

== See also ==
- Barkingside F.C. players
