= East Ham United F.C. =

East Ham United
- Full name: East Ham United Football Club
- Nickname: The Hammers
- Founded: 1933
- Dissolved: 2001
- Ground: The Manorway, London
- 2000–01: Essex Senior League, 11th of 16

East Ham United Football Club was a football club based in East Ham, Greater London, England. The club played at the Manorway.

== History ==
During the 1890s an unrelated club named East Ham Town competed in the South Essex League. During the 1910s, another unrelated club representing East Ham, named East Ham, competed in the Spartan League.

The club was established in 1933 as Storey Athletic after Storey Street School in North Woolwich. In 1955 the club was renamed East Ham United. They played in the London League until joining the Aetolian League in 1962 but after two seasons the league merged into the Greater London League. The club were initially placed in the A Section, and after finishing sixth in the league's first season, were placed in the Premier Division for the 1965–66 season. In 1969–70 the league merged into a single division, with East Ham winning the title. They then left the league, but joined the new Metropolitan–London League when it was formed in 1971 by a merger of the Greater London League and the Metropolitan League, and were placed in Division One. In 1975 the league merged with the Spartan League to form the London Spartan League. with East Ham placed in Division One. They were promoted to the Premier Division after finishing third in 1976–77, a season in which they also reached the quarter-finals of the FA Vase. After a single season in the Premier Division, the club transferred to the Essex Senior League in 1978.

After two good seasons, the club struggled in the Senior League, only finishing in the top ten three times in the next 21 seasons. In 2001 they merged with Barking to form Barking & East Ham United. The merged club folded in 2006 and whilst Barking were reformed, East Ham remained defunct.

== Honours ==
- Greater London League
  - Champions 1969–70

== Records ==
- Record attendance: 4,250 vs West Ham United, friendly, 15 February 1976
