= Imperial Fields =

Football stadium in Mitcham, London, England

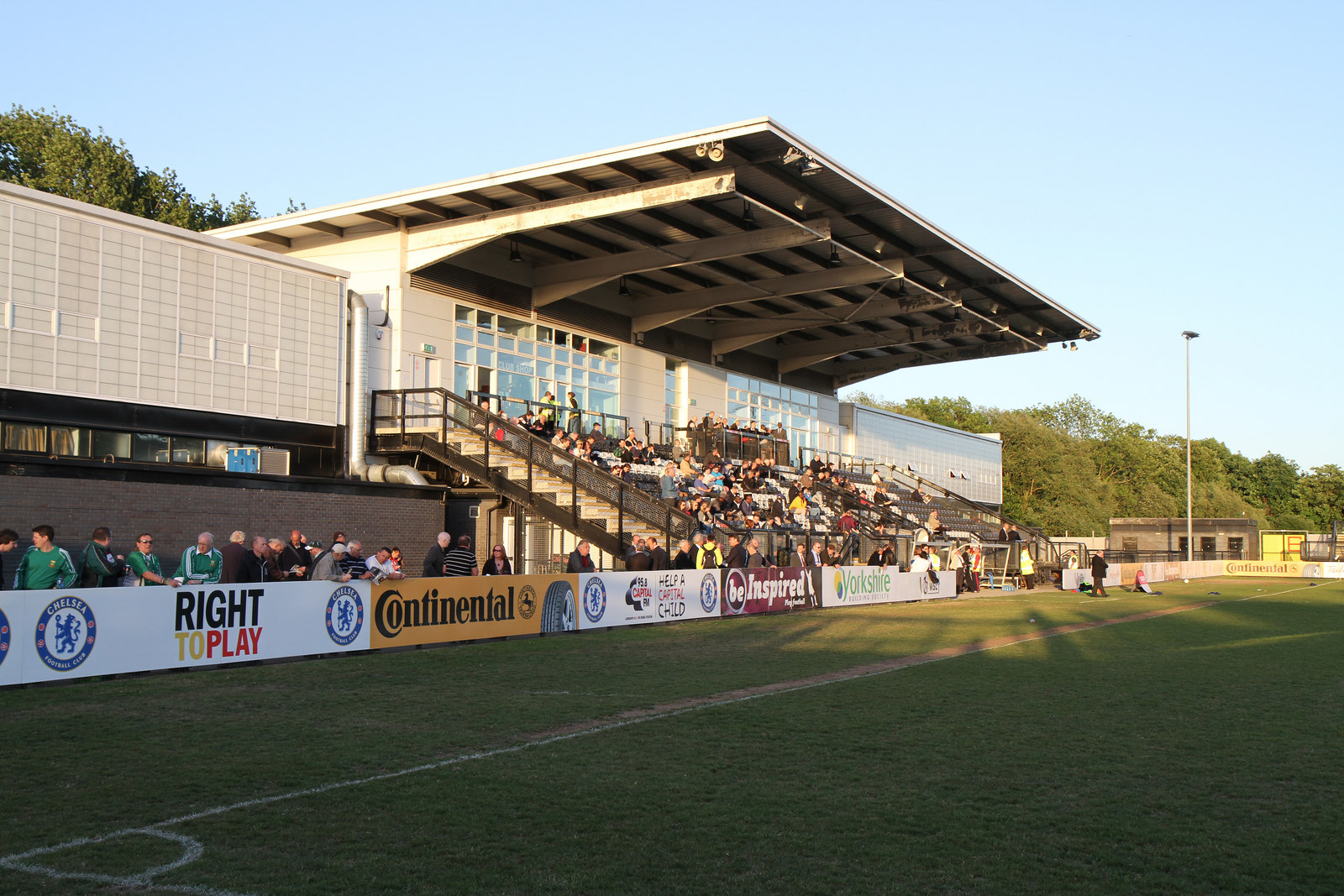
- Main stand
- Interactive map of Imperial Fields
- Location: Bishopsford Road, Mitcham, Greater London
- Coordinates: 51°23′36″N 0°10′21″W
- Capacity: 3,500 (612 seated)

Construction
- Opened: 2002

Tenants
- Tooting & Mitcham United (2002–present); Chelsea Ladies (2011); Tooting Bec (until 2022); Kingstonian (2022–2024); Wimbledon Women (2025–present)

Imperial Fields is a football stadium in Mitcham, London, which is home to Tooting & Mitcham United. It is also the former ground of Chelsea Ladies and Kingstonian. The stadium opened in 2002, and has a total capacity of 3,500 (612 seated).

== Men's football ==
Tooting & Mitcham United moved in 2002 from an all-wooden facility at Sandy Lane in Mitcham.

In the 2017–18 season, Dulwich Hamlet groundshared at the ground after disagreements with the owner of its Champion Hill ground.

The record attendance for Imperial Fields was set by Dulwich Hamlet in their Isthmian Premier Division play-off final win against Hendon with an attendance of 3,321 on 7 May 2018. Tooting & Mitcham's record attendance at the stadium was set by a 1–1 draw with AFC Wimbledon on 16 April 2005, which saw a crowd of 2,637.

Before the 2022–23 season, Kingstonian moved to Imperial Fields.

== Women's football ==
The stadium served as the home ground for Chelsea Ladies in the inaugural 2011 season of the FA Women's Super League, and hosted the league's first-ever match on 13 April 2011 between Chelsea and Arsenal Ladies. Gilly Flaherty scored the match-winning goal for Arsenal in the 1–0 match, in front of a crowd of 2,510. AFC Wimbledon Women became tenants starting with the 2025-26 season.
