= Thames Polytechnic F.C. =

Former association football club in England

Thames Polytechnic
- Full name: Thames Polytechnic Football Club
- Dissolved: 2003
- Ground: Avery Hill Park, Eltham
- Final season; 2002–03: Kent County League, 5th of 14

Thames Polytechnic Football Club was a football club based in Eltham, England that competed from the early 20th century until dissolving in 2003. Their home ground was Avery Hill Park, Eltham. Their final season was in 2002–03, where they finished 5th of 14 in the Kent County League.

== History ==
Founded shortly after the creation of Woolwich Polytechnic, Woolwich Polytechnic joined the London League Division One in 1924. In 1945, the club entered the FA Cup for the first time, playing Lloyds, losing in the first qualifying round after a replay. In 1956, Woolwich Polytechnic left the London League to play in the Kent County League, returning in 1963. The following year, the club were founding members of the Greater London League.

In 1971, the club were placed in the Metropolitan–London League and renamed Thames Polytechnic, following the merger between the institution and the Hammersmith College of Art and Building. In 1975, Thames Polytechnic became founding members of the London Spartan League, following the Metropolitan–London League's merger with the Spartan League. In 1985, the club joined the Kent League, before rejoining the Kent County League in 1992. In 2003, Thames Polytechnic withdrew from the Kent County League.

== Ground ==
Thames Polytechnic played at Kidbrooke Lane, Well Hall, in Eltham until 1993. These facilities were owned by the institution. Today, the grounds are still used by the University of Greenwich and Blackheath Rugby. For the remaining ten years of its existence, Thames Polytechnic played at Avery Hill Park, which was also owned by the university.

== Records ==
- Best FA Cup performance: second qualifying round, 1946–47
- Best FA Vase performance: first round, 1986–87
