= Cherrywood Road =

Football stadium in Farnborough, England

Coordinates: 51°18′38″N 0°45′44″W

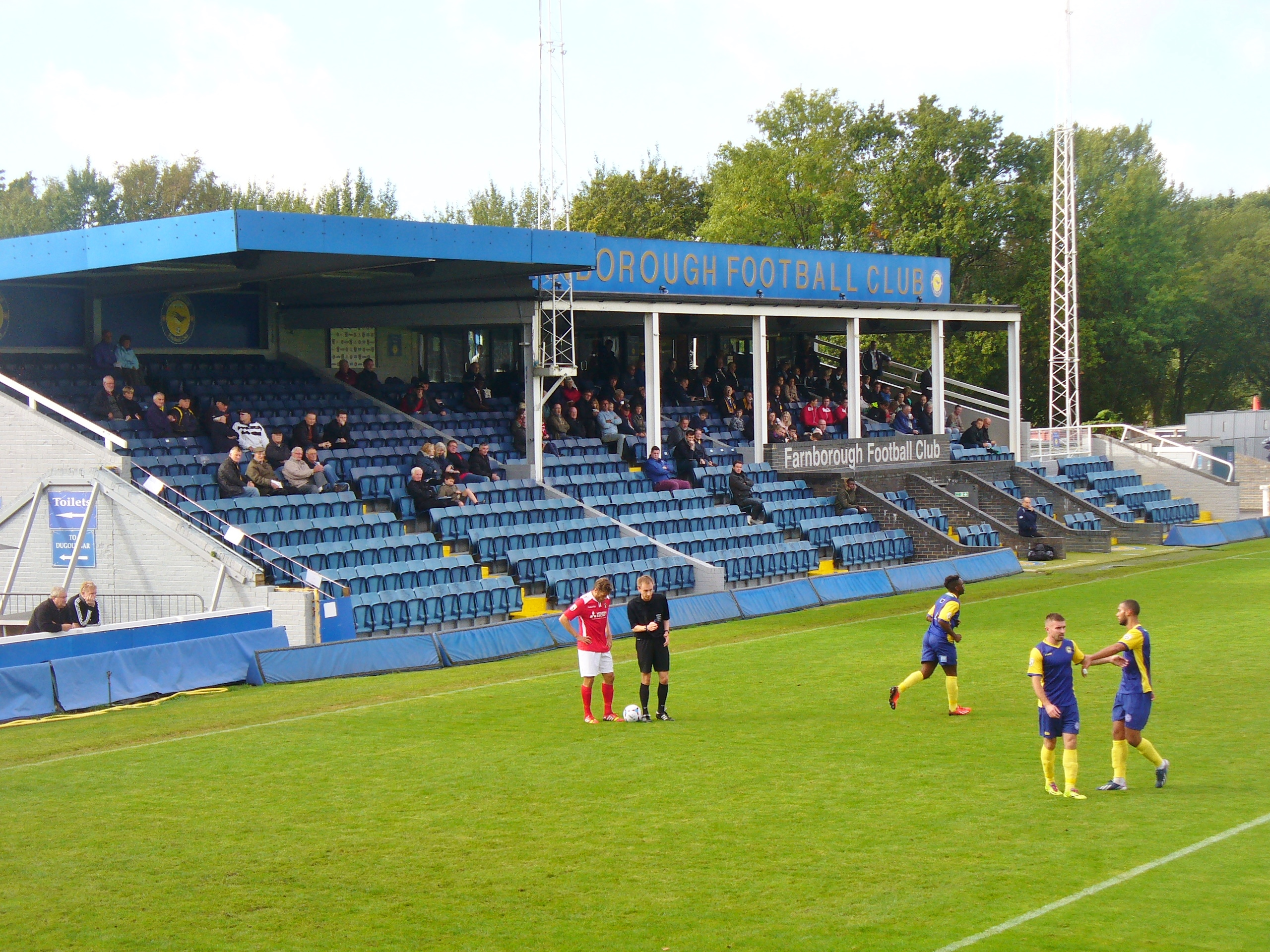
- Interactive map of Cherrywood Road
- Full name: Saunders Transport Community Stadium
- Location: Farnborough, Hampshire
- Owner: Rushmoor County Council
- Capacity: 6,500
- Record attendance: 4,267 Farnborough F.C. v Ebbsfleet United F.C.

Cherrywood Road, known as the Saunders Transport Community Stadium for sponsorship purposes, is the ground of Farnborough F.C. and the former home of Farnborough Town F.C. before the club went out of business in 2007. It lies in the town of Farnborough, Hampshire. The capacity of the ground is 6,500. Up to the mid-1970s Farnborough Town F.C. had played at Queens Road but moved due to the lack of facilities. Cherrywood Road was newly built with the help of a local company Worldwide Carpets.

The ground was originally called The John Roberts Ground but the name is rarely used with fans simply referring to the stadium as Cherrywood Road.

For a period in the early 2000s it was known as the Aimita Stadium after the company of chairman/manager Graham Westley. The fans were against the renaming of the stadium by Westley and the name reverted to Cherrywood Road following his departure in 2003. The ground was briefly called the Rushmoor Stadium at the beginning the 2010–11 season to entice the local council but confusion with the local Rushmoor Arena and the departure of chairman Simon Hollis resulted in a return, once again, to Cherrywood Road.

In 2013, the stadium was known as Paddy Power Park, after a sponsorship deal was signed with the bookmaking firm Paddy Power.

== The ground ==
On one side of the ground is the Main Stand, named in 2009 the Charles Mortimore Stand after the long-serving club president. This stand comprises covered seating and was extended and improved during summer 2008. The total length of the stand is approximately half that of the pitch and on either side there are small terraced areas. Opposite is another covered stand which runs the length of the pitch, this was previously a covered terrace but was converted to seating during the 2009 close season. This stand does not have an official name, however, many fans refer to it as the SWAN, an acronym which stands for Stand Without A Name . This additional work has brought the amount of seating at the stadium up to 950. The Moor Road End of the ground is terraced with a covering added to the rear section in summer 2008. The terracing was rebuilt during the 08/09 season.

The stadium's was repainted Red when rebranded as the AIMITA Stadium. However, at the reformation of Farnborough F.C., it reverted to yellow and blue to fit with the club's colours.

Away fans of visiting teams to the ground are usually not segregated, although for big matches away fans are usually housed at the Moor Road End. This is especially apparent when the club are playing local rivals Aldershot Town F.C. and Woking F.C.

== Prospect Road End ==
The Prospect Road End, affectionately known to Farnborough F.C. supporters as "The PRE" is currently undergoing redevelopment with a new 1350 seater stand that was due to be completed in September 2009. This stand will also feature disabled facilities and contain a concourse underneath with toilets and refreshment facilities. The new stand has been partly funded by a £150,000 grant from the Football Foundation.

The stand never ended up having a concourse and the entrances to where the concourse would have been are all blocked off.

== Records ==
The record attendance at the ground was 4,267 for a Conference South Play-Off final match between Farnborough F.C. and Ebbsfleet United F.C. on 15 May 2011.

Over the years, the ground has had the following average attendances:

- Season 2024-2025 - 987
- Season 2023-2024 - 893
- Season 2022–2023 - 602
- Season 2021–2022 - 502
- Season 2020–2021 - 356 (Season curtailed due to the Covid-19 pandemic)
- Season 2019–2020 - 299 (Season curtailed due to the Covid-19 pandemic)
- Season 2018-2019 - 326
- Season 2010–2011 - 782
- Season 2003–2004 - 945
- Season 2002–2003 - 881
- Season 2001–2002 - 837
