= Hatfield Town F.C. =

Association football club in England

Coordinates: 51.774987°N 0.22191256°W

Hatfield Town
- Full name: Hatfield Town Football Club
- Nickname: The Stags
- Founded: 1886
Home colours	Away colours

Hatfield Town Football Club is a football club based in Hatfield, Hertfordshire.

== History ==
The club was established in 1886 by members of Hatfield Cricket Club and was initially named Hatfield Football Club. They played in the Mid-Herts League, before joining the Northern Division of the Hertfordshire Senior County League in 1903. However, they left the league after a single season. In 1906 they were renamed Hatfield United after a merger with Dagmar House School Old Boys caused by there being only one pitch available. They rejoined the Hertfordshire Senior County League for the 1908–09 season; initially placed in the Eastern Division, they were moved to the Central Division for the 1909–10 season, in which they finished as runners-up to Ware. They were moved back to the Eastern Division in 1910 and were divisional champions in 1911–12; in the subsequent championship play-off, they finished as runners-up to Harpenden Town.

Hatfield were Eastern Division champions again in 1919–20, but finished last in the championship playoff. League reorganisation in 1921 saw them placed in the North Eastern Division, before the league was reduced to a single division in 1923. In 1922 they had been renamed Hatfield United Athletic after a merger with Hatfield Cricket and Athletics Club. The club finished bottom of the league in 1924–25 and 1926–27, but were league champions in 1935–36. After finishing as runners-up in 1936–37, they won back-to-back titles in 1937–38 and 1938–39.

In 1939 Hatfield joined Division Two East of the Spartan League, but the 1939–40 season was abandoned after only one match due to World War II. When football resumed in 1945, the club were placed in the Eastern Division, and in 1948 they adopted their current name. The club finished bottom of the league in 1953–54, after which they joined the Parthenon League. They finished second-from-bottom in their first season in the league and bottom in their second season, and after three further seasons they transferred to the London League in 1959.

Hatfield finished bottom of the London League in 1962–63, but were placed in the Premier Division the following season when the league gained a second division. In 1964 the London League merged with the Aetolian League to form the Greater London League, with Hatfield placed in the 'A' section. However, in 1965 the club transferred to the Metropolitan League. They finished bottom of the league in 1970–71, the last season before it merged with the Greater London League to form the Metropolitan–London League. Despite their lowly finish the previous season, Hatfield were placed in Division One, where they remained until the league merged with the Spartan League to form the London Spartan League in 1975, with Hatfield placed in Division One.

Hatfield finished second-from-bottom of Division One in 1976–77 and were relegated to the Senior Division. However, league restructuring saw them placed in the Premier Division for the 1978–79 season as the league was reduced to a single division. In 1979 the club joined Division One of the South Midlands League. They were Division One champions their first season, earning promotion to the Premier Division. However, after finishing fifth in 1983–84, the club folded due to financial difficulties.

The club was reformed in 1989 as Hatfield Town Athletic, joining Division Two of the Hertfordshire Senior County League. They were Division Two champions in 1989–90, Division One champions in 1990–91 and Premier Division champions in 1991–92, after which they rejoined the South Midlands League Premier Division as Hatfield Town. Despite being Premier Division runners-up in 1995–96, they folded again at the end of the season. After being reformed in 1997, the club joined Division One of the Hertfordshire Senior County League, finishing as runners-up in their first season and earning promotion to the Premier Division.

The next few seasons saw Hatfield become a yo-yo club as they were relegated to Division One at the end of the 1999–2000 season and then promoted the following season as Division One champions. Relegated again in 2001–02 after finishing bottom of the Premier Division, they were Division One champions the following season, earning an immediate return to the Premier Division. In 2007–08 the club were Premier Division champions, resulting in promotion to Division One of the Spartan South Midlands League. A third-place finish in Division One in 2008–09 saw the club earn promotion to the Premier Division at the first attempt. After two seasons in mid-table, the club finished bottom of the Premier Division in 2011–12, but were reprieved from relegation. Although they were reprieved again the following season, a third successive bottom two finish in 2013–14 saw the club relegated to Division One.

In 2018–19 Hatfield finished bottom of Division One and were relegated to the Premier Division of the Hertfordshire Senior County League. Although they were runners-up in the Premier Division in 2023–24, the club withdrew from the league and folded their adult team at the end of the season.

== Ground ==
The club originally played at Hatfield Park, owned by Lord Salisbury. They moved to the Showfield Ground on Stonecross Road in 1906, where they played until the land was sold for housing in 1980, after which the club relocated to Angerland Common. Plans to create a sports facility at the site of the gravel and brick pits on Stanborough Lane had been suggested prior to World War II. When local councillor Reg Gosling died in 1958, a fundraising appeal began to develop the facility as a memorial to him. A fifty-acre site was obtained and the facility was opened by David Cecil, 6th Marquess of Exeter on 4 July 1959 with a football pitch surrounded by a running track and a cycle track. The planned 1,000-seat stand had not been completed, although terracing was in place. A clubhouse, cover and seating were added in 1962. Rugby was also played on the pitch and Luton Town used it for some youth team matches. Between 1968 and 1990 it was the home ground of Welwyn Garden United. The original stand was taken down in 1976 and replaced with a new one.

In 1989 the re-established club played at Roe Hill Playing Fields, before moving to Gosling Sports Park in Welwyn Garden City in 1992 in order to be allowed promotion to the South Midlands League. When they were reformed again, the club played at the Birchwood Leisure Centre in Hatfield and then groundshared at Harpenden Town and Welwyn Garden City's Herns Lane, before returning to the Gosling Sports Park in 2010 when plans for a new ground at Angerland Common came to nothing. In 2018 they moved to London Colney's Cotlandswick Park, before returning to the Birchwood Leisure Centre in 2019.

== Honours ==
- South Midlands League
  - Division One champions 1979–80
- Hertfordshire Senior County League
  - Champions 1935–36, 1937–38, 1938–39, 1991–92, 2007–08
  - Division One champions 1990–91, 2001–02, 2002–03
  - Division Two champions 1989–90
  - Eastern Division champions 1911–12, 1919–20

== Records ==
- Best FA Cup performance: Second qualifying round, 1949–50, 1976–77, 2011–12
- Best FA Trophy performance: Second qualifying round, 1972–73
- Best FA Vase performance: Second round, 2012–13

== See also ==
- Hatfield Town F.C. players
