= Ulysses F.C. =

Former association football club in England

Ulysses
- Full name: Ulysses Football Club
- Founded: 1962; 64 years ago(?)
- Dissolved: 1991; 35 years ago
- Ground: University of London Athletics Stadium, Motspur Park
Home colours

Ulysses Football Club was a football club based in New Malden, England.

== History ==
Founded as a football club for graduates from the University of London, Ulysses first competed in senior football in the 1962–63 season, finishing eighth in the London League. In 1971, Ulysses joined the newly founded Metropolitan–London League, performing poorly in the league for a three-season spell. In 1975, a season after their first participation in the FA Vase, Ulysses joined the London Spartan League. At the end of the 1990–91 Spartan League season, Ulysses left senior football. Following their time in senior football, Ulysses competed in the Amateur Football Alliance and the Amateur Football Combination.

== Ground ==
Ulysses played at the University of London Athletics Stadium in Motspur Park. Fulham later purchased the facilities in 1999, converting the site into their training ground.

== Records ==
- Best FA Vase performance: Second round, 1974–75
