= Highfield F.C. =

Highfield
- Full name: Highfield Football Club
- Founded: 1945
- Dissolved: 1984
- Ground: Abbey Road, Waltham Abbey
- Final season; 1983–84: London Spartan League Premier Division, 13th of 15
Home colours

Highfield Football Club was a football club based in Waltham Abbey, England.

== History ==
In 1945, Highfield were formed, joining the Enfield Alliance League. The team formed its name from the first letters of the surnames of its founders, a group of friends from the local area. In 1963, Highfield joined the London League from the Northern Suburban Intermediate League. In 1971, Highfield joined the Metropolitan–London League, becoming founder members in the process. In 1975, Highfield joined the London Spartan League. In 1981, Highfield joined the FA Vase for the first time. In 1984, Highfield left the London Spartan League and folded following the loss of their Abbey Road ground to housing.

== Ground ==
During the early days of the football club, Highfield played at Willoughby Lane in Tottenham. Highfield later moved to the Northmet Sports Ground in Enfield. In the late 1970s, Highfield moved to Abbey Road in Waltham Abbey.

== Records ==
- Best FA Vase performance: Second round, 1982–83
