= Hornchurch Stadium =

Athletics & Football stadium in England

Coordinates: 51°33′24″N 0°14′18″E

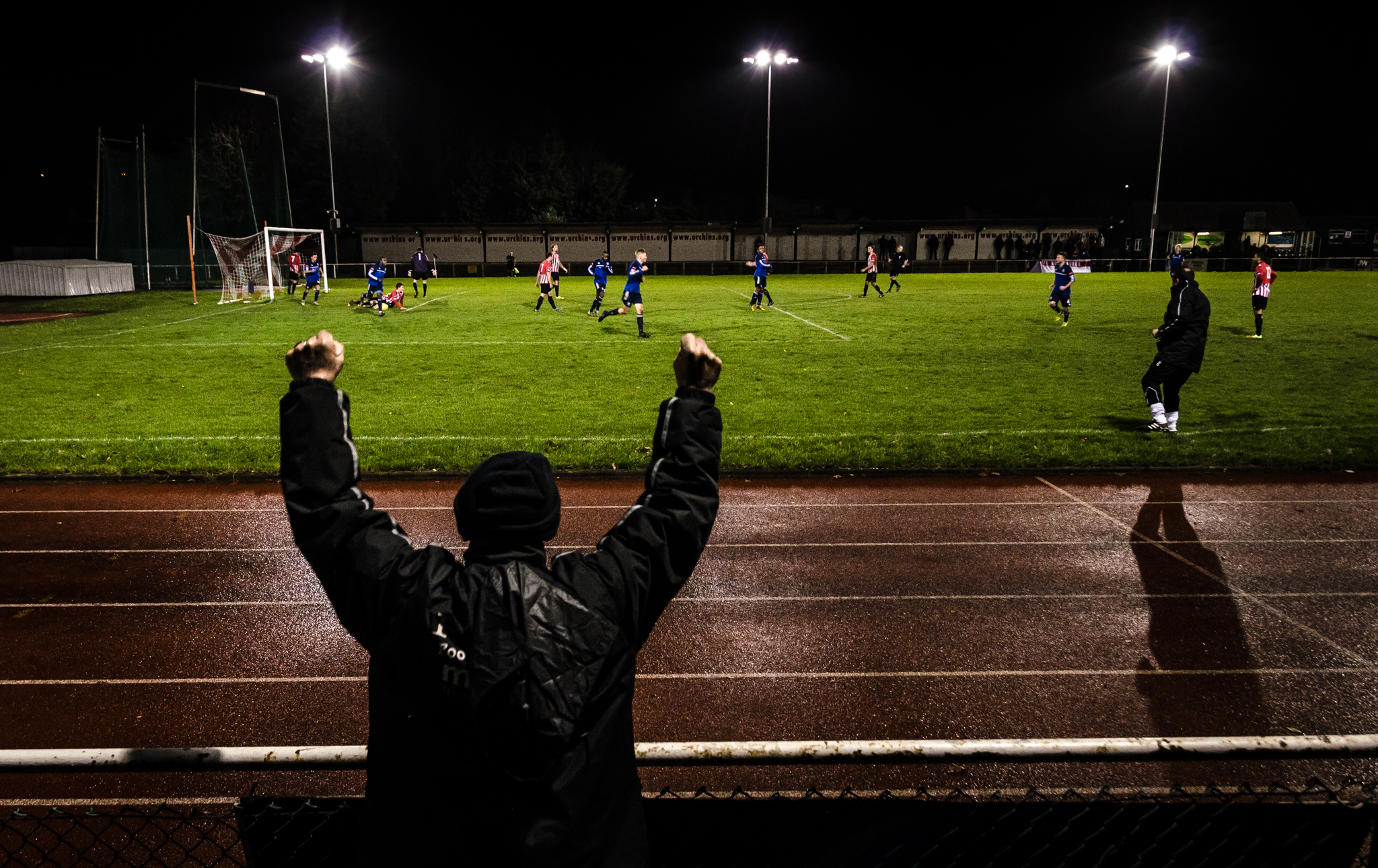
- Interactive map of Hornchurch Stadium
- Location: Upminster, England
- Coordinates: TQ553866
- Owner: Havering London Borough Council
- Capacity: 3000 (580 seated)
- Surface: Synthetic, 400m
- Public transit: Upminster Bridge

Construction
- Opened: 1956
- Renovated: 2004

Tenants
- Hornchurch F.C. Havering Mayesbrook; West Ham United L.F.C.

The Hornchurch Stadium is an athletics and football stadium located on Bridge Avenue in Upminster in the London Borough of Havering, East London, England. It is home to the Hornchurch F.C. and Havering Mayesbrook Athletics Club.

== History ==
The stadium was opened in 1956 by Hornchurch Urban District Council. It was the home ground of the original Hornchurch F.C. until they were dissolved in 2005.

== Facilities ==
The stadium has a capacity of 3,000, of which 580 is seated and 1,400 is covered. One stand, the 'Riverside', took its name from the River Ingrebourne, a few feet away.

Redevelopment Plans

Following Hornchurch FC's promotion to The National League, in June 2026 the club announced a redevelopment plan of the Stadium to meet Grade 1 requirements.

The proposed works would increase the capacity to over 4000.
