= Chingford F.C. =

Chingford
- Full name: Chingford Football Club
- Founded: 1952
- Dissolved: 1987
- Ground: Newgate Street, Chingford
- Final season; 1986–87: London Spartan League, 10th of 15

Chingford Football Club was a football club based in Chingford, England.

== History ==
Founded in 1947, Chingford Town joined the Southern League in 1948. The club folded in November 1950, following withdrawal from the Southern League in the 1950–51 season. In 1952, Parkhill were formed in Chingford, entering the London League changing their name to Chingford in 1955. In 1964, Chingford became founder members of the Greater London League, before becoming founder members of the Metropolitan–London League. In 1975, the club joined the London Spartan League as founder members, playing in the league system for 12 years, before their final season in 1987–88.

== Ground ==
The club played at Newgate Street in Chingford. Chingford briefly used the facilities of Tottenham Hotspur in 1963, whilst awaiting Newgate Street to be ready by September 1963.

== Records ==
- Best FA Vase performance: First round, 1974–75, 1977–78
