= Epping Town F.C. =

Coordinates: 51.7028°N 0.12228°E

Epping Town
- Full name: Epping Town Football Club
- Founded: 1888 (first incarnation); 1948 (current club)
- Dissolved: 1985 (first incarnation)
- Ground: Stonards Hill, Epping
- Chairman: Tomas O'Loughlin
- Manager: Simon Price
- League: Essex Olympian League Division Three North West
- 2025–26: Essex Olympian League Division Three North West, 9th of 12
Home colours

Epping Town Football Club is a football club based in Epping, Essex, England, currently playing in the Essex Olympian League Division Three North West.

== History ==
=== First incarnation ===
The original Epping Town were formed in 1888, winning the Woodford & District League in 1913 and 1920. The club joined Division Two East of the Spartan League in 1936. They moved into the Premier Division of the London League in 1955, and were Premier Division champions in 1963–64, the league's last season. They then became founder members of the Greater London League, and were placed in the "A" section. A seventh-place finish in 1964–65 was enough to earn a place in the Premier Division the following season. In 1966–67 they won the league, before joining the Metropolitan League in 1969. They won the league in 1970–71, but at the end of the season the league merged into the Metropolitan–London League, which Epping won at the first attempt. The following season they were runners-up, before winning a second title in 1973–74. They then joined Division Two of the Athenian League, which they won in 1975–76 to earn promotion to Division One. After finishing sixth in Division One the following season, they moved up to Division Two of the Isthmian League. The club resigned from the league at the end of the 1984–85 season due to financial problems and their record was expunged. Epping Town played their final game on 2 May 1985, losing 7–0 at home to Leyton-Wingate.

=== Second incarnation ===
Whilst the original Epping Town were in the Athenian League in the 1970s, Coopersale, formed in 1948, competed in the Essex Olympian League. In 1992, seven years after the demise of Epping Town, the club changed their name to Eppingsale. In 1999 the club again changed name, this time to Epping. In 2018 the club renamed themselves Epping Town. In 2021 they were promoted from Division Two to Division One of the Essex Olympian League. However, the club finished second-from-bottom of Division One in 2023–24 and were relegated back to Division Two. The following season saw them finish second-from-bottom of Division Two, resulting in relegation to Division Three North West.

== Ground ==
The original Epping Town club played at Stonards Hill in Epping, moving to the site in 1948 after playing at Bury Lane. In 1974, floodlights were installed at Stonards Hill.

The second incarnation of Epping Town also used Stonards Hill as their ground until 2020, before Epping Town Council refused to renew the license for the club to play at the site, forcing Epping Town to groundshare with Epping Upper Clapton Rugby Football Club at Upland Road in Thornwood. In 2023, the club returned to Stonards Hill after a merger with Epping Youth.

== Honours ==
- London League
  - Premier Division champions 1963–64
- Greater London League
  - Premier Division champions 1966–67
- Athenian League
  - Division Two champions 1975–76
- Metropolitan League
  - Champions 1970–71
- Metropolitan–London League
  - Division One champions 1971–72, 1973–74

== Records ==
- Best FA Cup performance: Fourth qualifying round, 1973–74
- Best FA Vase performance: Fifth round replay, 1976–77
