= Timeline of BBC Radio 5 Live =

Key events for the national radio station in the United Kingdom

A timeline of notable events relating to BBC Radio 5 Live, its predecessor BBC Radio 5 and its digital sister sports commentary station BBC Radio 5 Sports Extra.

== Radio 5 ==
1988

- 9 October – The BBC announces that a fifth national network will launch on the medium wave (MW) frequencies of BBC Radio 2. The announcement follows a directive from the Conservative government of the time, instructing the BBC to end its practice of simulcasting its national services on both AM and FM.

1989

- No events.

1990

- 15 August – Ahead of the launch of Radio 5, Radio 2 begins to wind down its transmissions on MW by broadcasting a daytime information service providing advice about how to listen to Radio 2 on FM. The service includes trailers for the new station.
- 27 August – Radio 5 launches at 9am. The station is on air from 6am until just after midnight, but only broadcasts its own live programming at peak times (breakfast, weekday mid-mornings and drivetime) alongside sport on weekend afternoons and youth programmes on weeknight evenings. The rest of its airtime is taken up with programming which had previously been broadcast as FM opt-outs on Radio 4 (schools, adult education and children's programmes), programmes from the World Service and simulcasts of the BBC's other national stations.
- 28 August – The first edition of the station's weekday breakfast programme Morning Edition is broadcast. It is presented by Sarah Ward and Jon Briggs. The programme also airs on Saturdays, with Briggs presenting on his own.
- 2 September – The first edition of the station's Sunday breakfast programme Sunday Edition is broadcast. Presented by Barry Johnstone, the programme begins an hour later than its weekday counterpart, at 7:30am.

1991

- 7 January – Sue McGarry and Julian Worricker replace Martin Kelner as presenters of drivetime show Five Aside.
- 17 January–2 March – Radio 4 News FM, the first rolling BBC Radio news service is on air during the first Gulf War. The service is deemed to be so successful that bosses begin looking at ways to launch a full-time news radio station.
- 30 March – Radio 5 starts broadcasting its own programmes between 11pm and midnight, replacing an hour of programmes from the World Service. Consequently, the late evening slate of programmes originating from different parts of the country expand from 90 to 120 minutes.
- September/October – The station moves into its second year of broadcasting with a further expansion of original programmes in slots, which had previously been used for simulcasts with other BBC national stations.
- 2 September – The first phase of this expansion occurs when Radio 5 launches a weekday lunchtime programme in conjunction with forces station BFBS. Called BFBS Worldwide, the programme continues to be broadcast until 1994.
- 28 September – Simulcasting of other BBC stations on Radio 5 occurs for the final time.
- 5 October – Football phone-in 6-0-6 is broadcast for the first time, commencing at 6:06pm. Danny Baker is the programme's host. Its launch is part of a new Saturday evening line-up, which replaces that final station simulcast.

1992

- 6 January – The first edition of The AM Alternative is broadcast. The new programme, presented by Johnnie Walker, is on air every weekday and replaces the three separate shows: This Family Edition, Sound Advice and The Health Show, which had previously occupied the mid-morning slot.
- 17 February – Danny Baker replaces Sarah Ward and Jon Briggs as presenter of the weekday breakfast programme Morning Edition.
- 15 May – World Service programmes are broadcast on weekday afternoons for the final time. It is replaced on the 18th with a Summer sports magazine, Sportsbeat.
- 10–26 June – For the first time, the BBC provides full radio coverage of an international football tournament, when it broadcasts live commentary of every game of Euro 92.
- 25 July–9 August – Radio 5 provides full live coverage of the 1992 Summer Olympics. Programmes run all day, from 6:30am until 10pm. This is the first time that BBC Radio has provided full live coverage of the Games.
- 15 August – Mark Curry takes over the weekend breakfast show, the new programme is called Weekend Edition. He had previously presented the Saturday morning children's programme On Your Marks, which had recently been replaced with two separate programmes: Get Set and Go!.
- 19 October – A Game of Two Halves launches as the winter replacement for Sportsbeat.

1993

- May
  - The broadcasting arrangements for Test Match Special for the 1993 cricket season see Radio 5 broadcasting the morning play, with the afternoon session remaining on Radio 3, Radio 5 does provide extended, but not full, commentary during weekday editions of Sport on 5.
  - Sportsbeat returns for its second and final summer run, with Tommy Boyd taking over from Ross King as the main presenter.
- 25 October – John Inverdale joins to present a new sports drivetime show, John Inverdale’s Drive-In. It replaces Five Aside, which had been on air since the station launched.
- 1 November – Liz Kershaw presents the first edition of a new lunchtime show called The Crunch. Consequently, BFBS Worldwide moves to the mid-afternoon slot, replacing Sportsbeat, which had aired its final programme three days earlier.
- 15 November – Michele Stevens replaces Danny Baker as the presenter of Morning Edition.
- The BBC announces that Radio 5, criticised by Director-General of the BBC John Birt as "improvised and disjointed", will relaunch as a combined news and sport station after plans to launch a news-only service on Radio 4’s long wave frequency are dropped after widespread opposition.

1994

- 27 March – BBC Radio 5 signs off at just after midnight, after three and a half years on air.

== Radio 5 Live ==
=== 1990s ===
1994

- 28 March – At 5am, Jane Garvey launches BBC Radio 5 Live. The new 24-hour station replaces the mix of sport, magazine, educational and children's programmes with a new rolling news service, whilst retaining the sports coverage from Radio 5. Other launch presenters include Adrian Chiles, Peter Allen, Diana Madill, Eddie Mair and Sybil Ruscoe, while John Inverdale, Liz Kershaw and Julian Worricker transfer from Radio 5 to the new station.
- 29 March – The first edition of Up All Night is broadcast.

1995

- 27 September – The BBC begins regular Digital Audio Broadcasting, initially just from the Crystal Palace transmitting station. Radio 5 Live is one of the stations carried on the new service, which allows it to be heard in a higher quality sound when compared to MW.

1996

- Eddie Mair leaves to join Radio 4.

1997

- 3 May – Brian Hayes takes over as weekend breakfast presenter.
- 6 May – Julian Worricker moves from weekend breakfast to replace John Inverdale as host of John Inverdale Nationwide, now renamed Nationwide.
- 13 October – Nicky Campbell joins the station to present the mid-morning show, following his departure from Radio 1. He replaces Brian Hayes, who continues to present the station's Sunday mid-morning programme.

1998

- BBC Local Radio stations start carrying 5 Live when they are not on air. Consequently, the station is heard regularly on FM for the first time, albeit only during overnight hours.
- 22 March – 5 Live's late night news bulletin News Extra and phone-in/talk show After Hours are broadcast for the final time. The following day, a new three-hour late show called Late Night Live launches and Up All Night is extended to become a four-hour show.
- 28 March – Edwina Currie joins to present the weekend late evening show, called Late Night Currie.
- 4 September – Jane Garvey takes over as host of Nationwide for its final few episodes.
- 14 September – Peter Allen joins Jane Garvey for the renamed drivetime show, 5 Live Drive, which replaces Nationwide. Julian Worricker takes over the breakfast programme, while Victoria Derbyshire joins the station later in September as co-presenter.

1999

- 26 March – Sybil Ruscoe leaves. She is replaced on the weekday afternoon show by Ian Payne.
- 3 April – The first edition of the weekend world news programme Global is broadcast.
- 4 April – The station launches a new morning political discussion show, Sunday Service, hosted by Fi Glover.

=== 2000s ===
2000

- July – Bob Shennan replaces Roger Mosey as the station's controller.
- Kevin Greening joins as a stand-in presenter, but leaves before the end of the year.

2001

- 8 May – Simon Mayo joins the station to present the afternoon programme and the weekly Friday afternoon show Kermode and Mayo's Film Review, as Mark Kermode also joins the station.
- July – Aasmah Mir joins on a full-time basis, having previously presented newsreading shifts as a freelance journalist.
- Radio 5 Live, along with other BBC radio stations, stops broadcasting via Sky's analogue satellite service.

2002

- 2 February – BBC Radio 5 Live Sports Extra launches.
- 6 April – The Weekend News is first broadcast. Initially presented by Matthew Bannister and Caroline Feraday, the new programme replaces Global.
- 29 April – Wake Up to Money, which had previously been part of Morning Reports, becomes a programme in its own right and is extended from 15 to 30 minutes. Consequently, Morning Reports is shortened to 30 minutes.

2003

- 4 January – Richard Evans and Aasmah Mir take over as presenters of The Weekend News.
- 13 January – Nicky Campbell replaces Julian Worricker as co-host of the breakfast show, and Fi Glover replaces Campbell as mid-morning presenter. Worricker takes on a revamped Sunday morning programme, which replaces Sunday Service. Matthew Bannister takes over the late show, replacing Glover.
- July – Julian Worricker takes over the mid-morning show from Fi Glover.
- 10 August – Edwina Currie presents her weekend programme Late Night Currie for the final time.
- October – The first series of Fighting Talk is broadcast.

2004

- August – Victoria Derbyshire takes over the mid-morning show.

2005

- 16 July – Stephen Nolan joins the station to present the weekend late-evening phone-in show.
- 8–12 September – 5 Live devotes its daytime schedule to broadcast extensive live coverage of the deciding Ashes cricket match. Normally, the station provides reports during its regular programmes.

2006

- Sport on 5 is renamed 5 Live Sport.
- 22 April – Lesley Ashmall and John Pienaar replace Aasmah Mir as presenters of The Weekend News, with Mir taking over the presenting duties on The Midday News.

2007

- 29 July – Long-running obituary programme Brief Lives is broadcast for the final time.
- September – Jane Garvey leaves to become the new presenter of Woman’s Hour on Radio 4.
- 9 October – Anita Anand joins Peter Allen as the new co-presenter of 5 Live Drive.
- November – Richard Bacon returns to the station to present the late evening show.

2008

- April – Adrian Van Klaveren replaces Bob Shennan as station controller.

2009

- 9 January – The Midday News is broadcast for the final time.
- 12 January – Nicky Campbell takes over the morning phone-in, following its incorporation into an extended breakfast show. The mid-morning show is pushed back an hour, running from 10am until 1pm.
- 5 September – Danny Baker begins presenting a new Saturday morning sports-based chat show. He had rejoined the station a year earlier to become one of the presenters of 6-0-6.
- 18 December – Simon Mayo presents the weekday afternoon show for the final time, as he moves to a new weekday show on Radio 2. However, he continues to present the weekly Friday afternoon show Kermode and Mayo's Film Review.

=== 2010s ===
2010

- 10 January – Comedy talk show 7 Day Sunday is broadcast for the first time.
- 11 January – Tony Livesey joins the station to present the late evening show, replacing Richard Bacon who takes over the afternoon programme. Gabby Logan launches a new lunchtime show.
- 1 February – Aasmah Mir joins Peter Allen as the new co-presenter of Drive, replacing Anita Anand.
- 5 September – Long-running evening news programme The Weekend News ends and is replaced by hour-long programmes, including 5 Live Investigates presented by Adrian Goldberg, Pienaar's Politics presented by John Pienaar and a new business show On the Money presented by Declan Curry.

2011

- April – Shelagh Fogarty replaces Gabby Logan as host of the lunchtime show. Anna Foster replaces Rachel Burden as host of the weekend breakfast show, as Burden moves to become co-host of the weekday breakfast show from 3 May, replacing Fogarty.
- Autumn – The station moves from London to MediaCityUK in Salford.
- 25 October – The BBC announces that, from the next season, it will axe the second commentator for football matches as a cost-cutting measure.

2012

- 27 July–12 August – 5 Live operates a temporary station, 5 Live Olympics Extra, to provide additional coverage of the 2012 Summer Olympics.
- 19 August – The Non-League Football Show launches as a national programme, presented by Caroline Barker. It had previously been broadcast on BBC Radio London since 2006.
- 14 November – Anna Foster joins Peter Allen as the new co-presenter of 5 Live Drive, replacing Aasmah Mir.

2013

- 19 February – Jonathan Wall replaces Adrian Van Klaveren as station controller.
- April – Tony Livesey becomes the weekend breakfast show's new co-host.
- 13 May – Phil Williams takes over the weekday late evening show.
- 16 May – Debut of Question Time Extra Time. The programme, which includes a simulcasted audio broadcast of the evening's edition of BBC One's Question Time, is presented by Stephen Nolan and John Pienaar. After the broadcast, they take a look at the topics raised.
- 28 September – Charlotte Green reads the classified football results for the first time; she replaces James Alexander Gordon, who retired in July and had read the results since 1974.

2014

- Wake Up to Money is extended from 30 to 45 minutes; consequently; Morning Reports is shortened from 30 to 15 minutes.
- 3 May – 5 Live Science, produced and presented by The Naked Scientists, makes its debut as a podcast and a weekend early morning programme.
- 1 July – The station mandates its programmes to be presented in Salford; as a result, it announces the departure of Richard Bacon, Victoria Derbyshire and Shelagh Fogarty, who are set to leave when the station's schedule is overhauled in the autumn.
- 6 October – The schedule changes are rolled out. Adrian Chiles and Peter Allen take on the mid-morning show called 5 Live Daily, each covering different days in the week, Dan Walker and Sarah Brett launch Afternoon Edition and Tony Livesey joins Anna Foster as the new 5 Live Drive co-presenter. The new schedule also sees the first sitting of The Friday Sports Panel.
- November – Emma Barnett, women's editor of The Daily Telegraph, joins the station. She presents a new Sunday evening programme called Hit List, a countdown of the 40 highest profile on-line news stories of the week.

2015

- 9 August – 7 Day Sunday is broadcast for the final time.
- 1 October – Plans to expand sister station Sports Extra are dropped for a second time, due to concerns over the impact it would have on commercial rivals such as Talksport.

2016

- August – The Non-League Football Show ends, when the BBC decides not to commission any more shows.
- September – Peter Allen and Jane Garvey are reunited to host a new Sunday evening show. Emma Barnett becomes the Wednesday to Friday host of 5 Live Daily and Nihal Arthanayake replaces Dan Walker as co-host of Afternoon Edition.

2017

- 19 June – The Brexitcast podcast is launched, exploring Brexit-related issues; it is also aired by 5 Live.

2018

- January – Changes to the weekday mid-morning Five Live Daily show take place: the Monday to Thursday editions are renamed The Emma Barnett Show, to coincide with her taking over the programme, and Adrian Chiles hosts the Friday show, which is renamed Chiles on Friday.

2019

- 21 January – On what would have been presenter Rachael Bland's 41st birthday, 5 Live launches the Rachael Bland New Podcasting Award, designed to encourage new broadcasting talent.
- 8 May – Phil Williams present his final late night show, as he leaves the station after 18 years.
- 9 May – Danny Baker is dismissed from his presenting role at 5 Live, after he appeared to mock the racial heritage of the Duchess of Sussex by sharing on social media an image of a couple holding hands with a chimpanzee dressed in clothes, with the caption: "Royal Baby leaves hospital". The BBC describes the incident as a "serious error of judgement"; he is replaced by Geoff Lloyd.
- 31 May – A new hour-long Friday afternoon show launches, presented by Elis James and John Robins. Consequently, the Friday edition of 5 Live Drive is reduced in length, starting an hour later at 5pm.
- 13 June – The BBC announces it has commissioned its award-winning Brexitcast podcast for television, launching on BBC One in September.
- September – Heidi Dawson replaces Jonathan Wall as station controller.

=== 2020s ===
2020

- 29 January – BBC News announces it will shed 450 posts, including roles from 5 Live, as part of £80m worth of savings being made by the corporation. The changes will include the ending of Morning Reports, which had been on air since the station launched in 1994, and weekend live content on Up All Night will be reduced.
- 1 February – Following the UK's departure from the European Union, the final edition of Brexitcast, recorded as a podcast for radio and titled "Over and Out!", is released.
- 6 February – Newscast makes its debut, replacing Brexitcast.
- 19 March – Rhod Sharp presents Up All Night for the final time. He had presented the programme for more than 25 years, which launched when 5 Live started broadcasting in March 1994.
- 23 March
  - In order to prioritise resources during the Coronavirus pandemic, 5 Live suspends overnight programmes between 1am and 5am to carry the output of BBC Radio London. This continued until early July, when 5 Live resumed its overnight programming with Dotun Adebayo replacing Rhod Sharp, the programme however is no longer called Up All Night.
  - Having been on air since the station was launched, Morning Reports, the last 5am news programme airs, it is replaced by an extended Wake Up to Money, which now broadcasts for a full hour from 5am.
- 6 July – Radio 5 Live stops relaying overnight broadcasting from BBC Radio London on weeknights, launching a new weekday phone-in discussion show presented by Dotun Adebayo from 1am to 5am. The World Football Phone-In and Virtual Jukebox, regular features from his weekend presenting role on Up All Night, are carried over to the new programme, which is simulcast on local radio. 5 Live continues to simulcast BBC Radio London on Friday and Saturday overnights.
- 10 December
  - Emma Barnett leaves to join Radio 4.
  - Question Time Extra Time is broadcast for the final time.

2021

- 7 January – Adrian Chiles is confirmed as presenter of the weekday mid-morning show on Thursdays, to add to Fridays, replacing Emma Barnett. Naga Munchetty joins the station to present the show from Monday to Wednesday.
- 9–11 April – Following the death of Prince Philip, Duke of Edinburgh, 5 Live abandons half its regular Friday to Sunday schedule in favour of simulcasting the BBC Radio News special programme.
- 12 August – Anna Foster co-presents her final 5 Live Drive show before moving to Beirut as a Middle East correspondent for BBC News.
- 11 September – Hayley Hassall begins hosting the weekend overnight programme.
- 5 November – Nicky Campbell presents his final Breakfast Show; he had co-presented the programme for the past 18 years.
- 8 November – Rick Edwards joins Rachel Burden to present a new look breakfast show. Rick replaces Nicky Campbell who moves to a new mid-morning phone-in slot.

2022

- March – BBC Radio 5 Live Sports Extra is renamed Radio 5 Sports Extra, as part of a rebranding of the BBC.
- 24 March – For a temporary period, between 1am and 5am, the station stops broadcasting overnight and rebroadcasts BBC World Service's programmes instead, this continues until 2 April.
- 1 April – The final edition of Kermode and Mayo's Film Review is broadcast on 5 Live, after 21 years on air. The show's one hour slot will be replaced by an extended 5 Live Drive.
- 26 May – BBC Director-General Tim Davie announces plans for an annual £500m of savings that will see the closure of the station's medium wave service by the end of 2027.
- 6 August – As the 2022–23 English football season gets under way, the Saturday afternoon classified football results are absent from Sports Report. On 8 August, the station announces it has dropped the reading of the results, read by Charlotte Green, because the programme has been shortened to make way for the 5:30pm Premier League commentary.
- 13 August – BBC Radio Scotland presenter Laura McGhie begins presenting weekend overnights on the station.
- 14 August – A new Sunday morning show begins, presented by Helen Skelton.
- 3 September – Patrick Kielty succeeds Scott Mills and Chris Stark as presenter of the Saturday mid-morning programme.
- 8–19 September – Following the death of Queen Elizabeth II, 5 Live abandons half of its regular schedule in favour of simulcasting a BBC Radio News special programme. The station broadcasts a revised schedule from 9 to 12 September and her state funeral on 19 September.
- 8 October–12 November – Radio 5 Live and Radio 5 Live Extra air coverage of the 2021 Women's Rugby World Cup, after the BBC secured exclusive UK audio rights to the competition. Coverage also appears on BBC Sounds. This is the first time that a women's rugby union tournament has received full live coverage on British radio, with Sonja McLaughlin, Sara Orchard and Laura McGhie presenting coverage.

2023

- 17 April–October – Nicky Campbell's weekday morning show is simulcast on BBC Two and BBC News.
- 20 June – Sport presenter Roddy Forsyth announces his departure from the station, following a diagnosis of Parkinson's disease.
- 16 July – Gordon Smart joins the station to present a Sunday evening show.
- 13 August – Helen Skelton presents her final Sunday morning show and leaves the station.

2024

- 1 January – Gordon Smart replaces Colin Murray as host of the Monday to Thursday editions of the late show.
- 27 June – Nihal Arthanayake presents his final edition of the weekday afternoon show.
- 2 September – A weekday afternoon politics-based programme launches, replacing the interviews and features-based programme that preceded it. The new show is presented by Matt Chorley and some of the features of the previous programme are incorporated into an extended lunchtime show.
- 15 October – It is announced that 5 Live would start sharing more news bulletins with Radio 2.

2025

- 18 April – Laura McGhie joins the station to present overnights on Fridays, Saturdays and Sundays from Glasgow. She shares the overnight slot with Dotun Adebayo, who will continue to broadcast from London on the other days of the week.
- 16 May – Two new services, BBC Radio 5 Sports Extra 2 and BBC Radio 5 Sports Extra 3, appear on BBC Sounds as streaming services to supplement Sports Extra.
- 4 June – The station is taken off air briefly, following a fire alarm at Westminster during the middle of a broadcast.
- 15 October – The BBC asks Ofcom to remove the requirement to report how many hours of live commentary are provided for each sport on 5 Live.
- 28 November – Richard Maddock is appointed as Head of BBC Radio 5 Live.

2026

- 26 January – Steffan Powell is appointed as permanent Breakfast co-presenter on Fridays and Sundays, with Rima Ahmed as co-presenter on Fridays.
- 31 March – The BBC begins the process of ending transmissions of 5 Live on MW by closing its transmitter in Bexhill-on-Sea.
- 31 July – Two more MW transmitters, covering Redruth and Folkestone, close.
- 3 August – The BBC confirms that Tony Livesey has left the station after 16 years.
- 24 September – BBC Local Radio proposes the merger of further programming, including a joint weekday late show produced with 5 Live that could begin from April 2027.
- 30 September – The station has its medium wave transmitters in Exeter and Brighton switched off.
- December – Rachel Burden and Rick Edwards will present 5 Live Breakfast for the final time.

2027

- January – Naga Munchetty will take over the weekday breakfast show, with Rachel Burden taking over her mid-morning slot.
- April – Weekend Breakfast will be shortened to a two-hour programme, as a result of further budget cuts at the BBC.
- It is expected that 5 Live will end all transmissions on medium wave by the end of this year.
