= Dave Anderson (footballer) =

British footballer (born 1962)

Personal information
- Date of birth: 11 March 1962 (age 64)
- Place of birth: Northern Ireland
- Position: Goalkeeper

Youth career
- Wolverhampton Wanderers
- Sheffield United

Senior career*
Years	Team	Apps	(Gls)
- Glentoran
- Bangor

International career
- Northern Ireland B

Managerial career
- Enfield
- Aylesbury United
- St Albans City
- Harrow Borough
- Southall
- North Greenford United
- 1999–2004: Hendon
- 2004–2007: AFC Wimbledon
- 2007: Windsor & Eton (assistant)
- 2007–2008: St Albans City
- 2008–2010: Northwood
- 2010–2011: Slough Town (assistant)
- 2011–2015: Harrow Borough
- 2018–2019: Chertsey Town
- 2021: Barnet (assistant)
- 2022–2023: Chertsey Town
- * Club domestic league appearances and goals

Dave Anderson (born 11 March 1962) is a Northern Irish media personality and former association football player and manager, best known for his role as manager of AFC Wimbledon from 2004 to 2007. He was most recently manager of Chertsey Town.

A goalkeeper in his playing days, Anderson played senior football for Glentoran and Bangor and internationally for Northern Ireland B before retiring prematurely through injury. Anderson moved back to England and embarked on a career in management at non-League level, being associated with over ten teams in the course of a career lasting over two decades.

Anderson is also a regular contributor to BBC Radio 5 Live's show about non-League football, the Non-League Football Show.

== Playing career ==
Anderson was a goalkeeper during his playing days and had youth contracts with Wolverhampton Wanderers and Sheffield United.

He went home to Northern Ireland to play for Glentoran and Bangor, where he was the youngest player to travel in the UEFA Cup.

He represented Northern Ireland at Schoolboy, Youth and B level.

While at Bangor his playing career was prematurely ended by injury, at the age of 23.

== Management ==
Anderson subsequently moved back to England where he lived in Manchester: he was childhood friends with Manchester United player Norman Whiteside. After a spell out of football he moved to London, where he met his wife at Queens Park Rangers player Alan McDonald's wedding, and approached football again through non-League in around 1984 through his friendship with McDonald and fellow QPR player Ian Stewart.

Anderson went on to hold back-room and managerial roles at Enfield, Aylesbury United, St Albans City, Harrow Borough (where he was assistant manager on three separate occasions), Southall and North Greenford United.

Anderson was assistant manager at Hendon from 1999 to 2001 before taking the manager's position. In his last three seasons with the club he led them to eighth, third and fourth-place finishes in the Isthmian League Premier Division, along with three consecutive victories in the Middlesex Senior Cup.

Anderson was appointed as AFC Wimbledon manager by then-chairman Kris Stewart in the summer of 2004, taking with him his backroom staff from Hendon. In 2004–05, his first season in charge, Anderson successfully led the club to promotion, winning a league and cup double consisting of the Isthmian League First Division and the Surrey Senior Cup. After a tough season in 2005–06 the Dons eventually finished trophy-less after losing out in the Isthmian League Premier Division playoffs and defeat in the Surrey Senior Cup final to local rivals Kingstonian. Anderson's objective for the 2006–07 season was no less than promotion, and following a defeat against Bromley in the play-off semi-final, Anderson stepped down from the job on 2 May 2007.

Anderson went on to the assistant position at Windsor & Eton, though he maintained a desire for a position as first team manager and thus subsequently left the club that October, joining former club St Albans City as manager. He was sacked in January 2008, having failed to turn around the club's fortunes.

Following eight months out of management Anderson took the management job at Northwood. The club enjoyed their best ever run in the FA Trophy and missed out on a play-off spot by one point in the 2008–2009 season. He departed Northwood unexpectedly in March 2010, citing both personal reasons and the club's financial difficulties at the time in his resignation.

On 10 June 2010 Anderson was announced as assistant manager of Slough Town, following the decision of former assistant Darren Salton to stand down due to the travel required for the job.

In June 2011, Anderson left Slough Town to take on the manager's role at Harrow Borough after David Howell left Harrow.

In March 2018 he was appointed manager of Chertsey Town. He retired from football in May 2019 after winning Combined Counties League and guiding Chertsey to FA Vase victory, becoming the first club in Surrey to win it.

Anderson came out of retirement to join Barnet in April 2021 as goalkeeping coach and assistant to first team coach Simon Bassey. He reverted to a first team coaching role following Bassey's departure. Anderson left the Bees in April 2022.

In October 2022, Anderson returned to Chertsey Town as manager. He departed the club in April 2023, sitting two points outside of the play-offs.

== Media work ==
Anderson is a regular presenter and contributor to BBC Radio 5 Live's weekly programme about non-League football, the Non-League Football Show. He also hosts podcast "The Non League Gaffer Tapes" where he interviews managers one on one. Series put on hold due to COVID

== Personal life ==
Anderson is married with a son (Sam) and a daughter (Lucy).
