= George Ruffell Memorial Shield =

The George Ruffell Memorial Shield, also known as the Middlesex Super Cup, is a cup that has been held every season since 1999 except 2008 between the holders of the Middlesex Senior Cup and the Middlesex Charity Cup. In 2001, because the Middlesex Charity Cup was not completed in the 2000-01 season, the winners of the Middlesex Senior Cup, Uxbridge, played against the previous winners of the Middlesex Charity Cup, Hayes. There was no competition in the calendar year 2005 because the match was moved from the beginning of the season to the end of the season. In 2008, the competition was not played because the Middlesex Charity Cup was not completed.

== Winners ==
No.	Year	Winner	Scorers	Runner-up	Scorers	Score	Venue
1	1999	Hampton & Richmond	Craig Maskell (2), Andy Walker, Jason Shaw	Hendon	Steve Baker, Marvyn Watson	4 - 2	Hampton
2	2000	Hayes		Ashford Town Middx	-	4 - 0	Hayes
3	2001	Hayes		Uxbridge		4 - 3	Uxbridge
4	2002	Hendon	Martin Randall	Enfield Town	-	1 - 0	Hendon
5	2003	Feltham	-	Hendon	-	0 - 0 aet 6-5 in penalty shootout	Uxbridge
6	2004	Hendon	Daniel Julienne 2, John Frendo, Mark Nicholls	Wealdstone	Brian Jones 2	4 - 2	Hendon
7	2006	Hampton & Richmond	Lawrence Yaku 73', Ryan Lake 83' (pen)	Harrow Borough	-	2 - 0	Harrow
8	2007	Harrow Borough	Leech, Adomah, Hewitt o.g.	Northwood	-	3 - 0	Northwood
9	2009	Enfield Town	Fabio Valenti 2, Rudi Hall 2, Sammy Winston, Stuart Blackburne	A.F.C. Hayes		6 - 2	Hayes
10	2010	Staines Town	Leroy Griffiths 2, Gareth Risbridger	North Greenford United	Sean Hillier, Gary Senior, o.g.	3-3, Staines win 5-4 on penalties	North Greenford United
11	2011	Wealdstone	own goal (Odaine Kemar-Smith)	Staines Town	-	1 - 0	Staines Town

== George Ruffell ==
George Ruffell was a long-standing member of the Middlesex FA. After he died in 1998 the cup was established in his honour and it raises money for Macmillan Cancer Support.

== Precursors ==
Prior to the establishment of this competition, there were two less formal events for which the winners of the Middlesex Senior Cup were invited at the start of the following campaign. The first of these was the Merthr-Middlesex Charity Shield (inaugurated at the start of season 1990/1), and this was superseded by the Melksham-Middlesex Charity Shield. The first of these competitions was promoted by Russell Grant, the television personality and patron of a number of sports clubs in Middlesex. The game was instigated to raise funds for the Harefield Hospital, Middlesex's famous heart hospital, and involved Merthyr Tydfil FC as it came from the area of the UK - South Wales - with one of the highest rates of heart disease, reportedly because of risks associated with the mining industry. This event had disappeared by 1997/8, when the Federation of Middlesex Sport, using a contact in Wiltshire, instigated the successor, of which only two editions are known. Neither of these Charity Shield single-match competitions was an official Middlesex County FA event, but both were sanctioned and tacitly supported by the county. As with the Middlesex Super Cup, drawn matches went straight to a penalty shoot-out, without extra time.

The following results are known; it is not known whether any other editions of these were played:

MERTHYR-MIDDLESEX CHARITY SHIELD

11.08.1990 Merthyr Tydfil 2-2 Staines Town (Staines won 3-2 on penalties)

??.??.1991 - Merthyr Tydfil 2-1 Hayes

??.??.1992 - Merthyr Tydfil 2-1 Yeading (Merthyr Tydfil won 4-2 on penalties)

??.??.1993 - Merthyr Tydfil 1-0 Harrow Borough

06.08.1994 Merthyr Tydfil 5-1 Staines Town

MELKSHAM-MIDDLESEX CHARITY SHIELD

02.08.1997 Melksham Town 1-2 Staines Town

01.08.1998 Melksham Town 0-1 Hampton
