= Harrow Borough F.C. =

Association football club in London, England

Harrow Borough
- Full name: Harrow Borough Football Club
- Nicknames: The Boro, The Reds
- Founded: 1933; 93 years ago
- Ground: Earlsmead Stadium, South Harrow
- Capacity: 3,070 (350 seated)
- Chairman: Peter Rogers
- Manager: Wayne Carter
- League: Isthmian League South Central Division
- 2025–26: Isthmian League South Central Division, 8th of 22
- Website: www.pitchero.com/clubs/harrowborough/
Home colours	Away colours

Harrow Borough Football Club is an English football club based in Harrow, London. They were founded in 1933 and compete in the Isthmian League South Central Division. Harrow Borough's home ground is Earlsmead Stadium, which has a capacity of 3,070. Harrow Borough moved into Earlsmead Stadium in 1934 and has kept it as their home stadium since then. On 8 September 2026, it was announced that the club would leave the stadium at the end of the 2026–27 season, with the sale scheduled to be completed on 18 June 2027, bringing an end to more than 90 years at the ground. The club is seeking a groundshare arrangement for the 2027–28 season and beyond. Harrow Borough's colour is red, which is the colour of their home kit. Their crest depicts the coat of arms of the London Borough of Harrow.

Harrow Borough have rejected the chance to join the Football Conference, now known as the National League, twice due to financial reasons. Harrow have won the Isthmian League Premier Division once, in 1983–84. They have won the Middlesex Senior Cup, Middlesex Charity Cup, Harrow Senior Cup and George Ruffell Memorial Shield. Their most recent cup achievements have been winning the Middlesex Senior Cup and Middlesex Charity Cup, both in 2015 and reaching the first round of the FA Cup in 2021–22, for the fifth time in their history, when they lost to Portsmouth. Their most recent league achievement has been reaching the Isthmian League Premier Division Playoffs in 2010–11.

== History ==
=== Early history – Roxonian F.C. to Harrow Town F.C. ===
The club was originally formed in 1933 under the name Roxonian F.C. and played their first season in the Harrow and District League finishing runners up. The next season saw the club move into a new ground, Earlsmead Stadium, and a new league. They started in the Spartan League Division Two West and in 1938 they would finish second. As only the Champions were promoted they would have to wait till the following season when they finished top under their new name of Harrow Town F.C. to progress. The eruption of war in the 1940s saw Harrow Town's ascent cut short, relegating the team to the Middlesex Leagues until the war finished. The war years saw Harrow Town compete in the West Middlesex Combination and then the Middlesex Senior League. After the end of the war, the club finally made its rightful position at the top level of the Spartan League. They remained in the Spartan League until finishing runners up in 1958 and being promoted to the Delphian League.

=== 1960s and 1970s ===
When the Delphian League disbanded in 1964 Harrow Town were accepted into the Athenian League, where they were promoted to Division One at the first attempt having finished runners up and only missing out on the top spot on goal difference. In the 1960s the club began to run into financial trouble. Coming close to liquidation, Harrow Town was forced to sell their second pitch at Earlsmead to the council to try and survive. Earlsemead Primary School was later built on this land. Now reduced to one pitch, the club, renamed to Harrow Borough F.C. and gaining them the nickname ‘Boro’, managed to make some gains and got elected to the Isthmian League in Division Two in 1975. In 1979 they were promoted, having finished second, to what was now called the Premier Division where they have played ever since. Harrow Borough redeveloped their ground after selling the second pitch.

=== 1979–2004 – Success and stability ===
Their first few seasons in the Premier Division saw steady progress. In 1982–83 the club finished third in the league and won the Middlesex Senior Cup. Harrow also had its furthest ever run in the FA Trophy reaching the semi-finals only to lose in the second leg to the eventual winners Telford United.

In 1983–84, the club's most successful season to date, they won the Isthmian League championship by seventeen points. The same year saw Harrow have its greatest ever FA Cup run, reaching the 2nd round proper before being knocked out by Newport County, who were then in Division Three (now League One).

During this period the importance place on ensuring the long term security of the club led to them turning down the financially risky promotion to the Football Conference twice. 1985 saw manager Micky Tomkys retire and a steady decline in the club's fortunes followed, having finished fifth and sixth in the following seasons.

After Boro's decline in the late 1980s, a new manager, Harry Manoe, was appointed and Harrow saw a resurgence. In 1993 they did a double, winning both the Middlesex Senior and Charity Cup beating Chelsea 4–1 in the semi-finals of the latter. The early nineties also saw an improvement in league form after several disappointing seasons previously.

Since the turn of the century, the club have failed to match earlier league successes and have gone on a slow decline, finding themselves often drawn into relegation battles. In 2000 they avoided relegation by only a single goal on goal difference, earning them the nickname "Houdini Boro". In 2003 David Howell was appointed as the new manager and the performances improved immediately; in 2004 Boro lost on penalties in a play-off which would have seen them join the Conference South, the sixth tier of English football.

=== 2005–2010 – Cup finals and success ===
Having missed out in the finals of the Middlesex Senior Cup in 2001, Harrow would finally bring home silverware in the form of the Middlesex Charity Cup in 2006, beating Enfield 2–0 in the final. Harrow retained this cup in 2007 beating Brook House in the final on penalties.

Having won the competition in 2006 and 2007, Boro were entered in the Middlesex Super Cup, a cup which faces off the winners of the Middlesex Senior Charity Cup and the Middlesex Senior Cup. It is formally known as the George Ruffell Memorial Shield. Boro lost 2–0 in 2006 to Hampton & Richmond but won the cup the following year in 2007 beating Northwood 3–0.

In the 2008–09 season, Boro managed to reach the final of the Isthmian League Cup. Boro beat Hendon, Godalming Town, Harlow, Horsham and Ashford Town (Middx) to reach the final before losing to Isthmian League Division One side Tilbury.

The 2009–10 season saw the introduction of the Harrow Borough youth team, playing their football in the Isthmian Youth League West Division. Their first season youth football led them to finishing in 6th place.

=== 2010–11 – League improvement ===
Harrow Borough finished the 2009–10 season in 14th place in the Isthmian League Premier Division. In the summer and pre-season following, Borough managed to reduce debts. After starting the season slowly, the 2010–11 season saw the club qualify for the first round of the FA Cup for only the third time in their history. Borough bowed out to eventual League Two champions Chesterfield 2–0 at Earlsmead.

After being knocked out of the FA Cup in November, Harrow Borough sparked an unbeaten run into January before losing to Folkestone Invicta. Following this, Borough sold young striker Troy Hewitt to Queens Park Rangers. Borough managed to end the 2010–11 season strongly despite losing Troy Hewitt and finished on a good run of form. A 1–1 draw on the final day of the season against Cray Wanderers was enough to secure a play-off spot away to Tonbridge Angels. Harrow Borough lost 3–2 after extra time in the semi-finals to Tonbridge. After going 2–0 down early on, veteran striker Rocky Baptiste scored two goals to force extra time, but Tonbridge scored a late winner. In June 2011, long serving manager David Howell left Borough, along with assistant Ken Charlery, to join St Albans City.

=== 2011–12 – New manager ===
In June 2011, David Howells successor was announced. Dave Anderson was chosen as the man to lead Boro into the 2011–12 season and help to continue with the clubs non league plan. He led Boro to safety in his first season, with the club finishing 17th in the Isthmian Premier Division. A massive 53 different players were used in the first team as Dave Anderson had to rebuild a squad from scratch. The club could not match the exploits in the FA Cup from the previous season, going out in the 2nd Qualifying Round to Dartford. Boro went out in the 2nd Qualifying Round of the FA Trophy, to AFC Hornchurch in a replay. Boro also lost out in the league cup, losing to Cheshunt at home in the 3rd round, Middlesex Senior Cup losing to North Greenford United in the 2nd round and London Senior cup, losing to Hendon in the quarter-finals.

Anderson stepped down in January 2015 following 3 1/2 years in the job, citing the poor run of form as the reason for leaving.

=== 2015–2017 A change in management, survival, double cup success and reprieve ===
With Harrow struggling in the relegation zone, Anderson resigned in January 2015. After 30 applications for the job, a shortlist of 8 was drawn up by the board. On 25 January 2015, Harrow confirmed the appointment of Steve Baker as the club's new manager, arriving from Isthmian League Division One South side Chipstead having beaten off competition from Kevin Gallen and Rufus Brevett for the job. Despite taking the job with the club deep in relegation trouble, a tremendous run of form saw Baker steer Harrow Borough to safety as the club ended the 2014/15 season in 16th place, as well as progressing to two cup finals in both Middlesex competitions – the Middlesex Senior Cup and Middlesex Charity Cup. Baker steered the club to victory in the Middlesex Senior Cup final, with a 1–0 win over Hanwell Town on 9 May 2015 and then led Harrow to victory in the Middlesex Charity Cup final on 1 August 2015 with a 3–0 win over Cockfosters to complete the 'Middlesex double'. Success in the Charity Cup final was Harrow's first since 2007 and their fifth all time.

The 2016–17 season started positively with Harrow Borough reaching the first round proper of the FA Cup for the first time in five years. Harrow faced English Football League side Northampton Town away and lost the tie 6–0. Harrow's form in the league dropped as well and in May 2017, Boro's long stay in the Premier Division was set to come to an end when Harrow lost 2–0 to Lowestoft Town on the final day of the 2016-17 season and saw them finish in the relegation zone. A few weeks, however, after the end of the season, following alterations higher up the pyramid involving promotions and relegations, Harrow were offered a reprieve and the relegation was reversed, which saw the club remain in the Premier Division for the 2017–18 season.

== Ground ==
Harrow Borough play their home games at Rogers Family Stadium. It has been home to Harrow Borough since 1934, a year after their formation. It is located in South Harrow. The stadium was originally known as Dabbs Field, and then as Earlsmead. This is believed to have been the site of a medieval battle. The stadium has a capacity of 3,070 with 350 seats and covering for 1,000 people. The record attendance of 3,000 was set in 1946, for an FA Cup match against local rivals Wealdstone. On 9 September 2026, it was announced that the club would leave the Rogers Family Stadium at the end of the 2026–27 season, following the sale of the stadium in May 2027. The club is expected to groundshare at another venue in West London from the 2027–28 season.

== Club crest ==
In 1933, the club bore the coat of arms of the London Borough of Harrow. The shield represents various parts of Harrow. The green, horizontal bar represents the presence of the green belt in the town. A flaming torch can also be found on the shield, symbolising knowledge for Harrow School. A quill pen refers to Pinner and the famous authors who have lived there and finally, a small cluster of trees reflect Harrow Weald and the mound on Harrow-on-the-Hill. The motto reads as "Salus Populi Suprema Lex" which translates from Latin as "The well-being of the people is the highest law".

Harrow Borough wear a slightly modified version of this badge on their playing kit, using a simple red and white colour scheme but the same pictures and symbols can be found as in the logo.

== Rivalries ==
Harrow Borough's two main rivals are Wembley and Wealdstone, although neither of these two teams currently play in the same league as Harrow Borough.

Wealdstone are considered to be Harrow Borough's main, long-standing rivals due to the geographical proximity between the two clubs. However, Wealdstone have regularly played at a higher level and league fixtures between the teams have been rare, historically. The last match played in the "Harrow derby" was a 3–0 home victory for Wealdstone in the Isthmian League Premier Division in the 2013–14 season.

Wembley has also been a local rival but the rivalry has somewhat diminished as Wembley's fall down the leagues means there are currently very few fixtures between the two clubs.

Harrow Borough also have a rivalry with Hendon. The sides have played each other 29 times since 2008, the most recent being on 6 April 2026, when Harrow Borough won 3–0 at home.

== Honours ==
=== League ===
- Isthmian League
  - Premier Division – Winners 1983–84
  - Division One – Runners up 1978–79
  - Premier Division – Playoff Semi-finalists 2010–11
- Athenian League
  - Division Two- Runners up 1964
- Spartan League
  - Runners Up 1958
  - Division Two West – Winners 1939, Runners up 1938
- Harrow & District League
  - Division One – Runners up 1934

=== Cup ===
- Middlesex Senior Cup – Winners 1983, 1993, 2015, Finalists 2001, 2019, 2023
- Middlesex Charity Cup – Winners 1980, 1993, 2006, 2007, 2015, Finalists 1979
- Harrow Senior Cup – Winners 1996, 1998
- NW Middlesex Invitation Cup Finalists – 1957, 1958, 1960
- George Ruffell Memorial Shield Winners 2007/08
- Isthmian League Cup Finalists 2009

== Managers ==
- D.J. Canney 1933–1934
- F.S. Green 1935–36
- Teddy Thompson 1936–9
- J. High 1939–41
- F.J. Hinch 1941–42
- J. High 1942–43
- W. Saunders 1942–46
- Eric Boden 1946–50
- G.H. Blacklee 1950–51
- F.W. King 1951–1952
- A. Bridges 1952
- D. Russell 1952–53
- H. Clancy 1953–1955
- Tom Loftus-Tottenham 1955–59
- Bernie Reeves 1959–65
- R. Clark 1965–67
- F. Avery 1967–68
- T. Williams 1968
- R. Churchill 1968–72
- D. Richards 1972–74
- M. Boreham 1974–75 (Caretaker)
- G Taylor 1975–77
- Micky Tomkys 1977–85
- Keith Chamberlain 1985–90
- Tom McAlister 1990–91
- Peter Lawrence 1991–92
- George Borg 1992–93
- Harry Manoe 1993–96
- Bob Dowie 1996–98
- Alan Paris 1998–99
- Edwin Stein 2000–03
- David Howell 2003–11
- Dave Anderson 2011–15
- Steve Baker 2015–2023
- Jordan Berry 2023–2024
- Ben Bukowski 2024- 2025
- Wayne Carter-June 2025

== Management team ==
Position	Staff
First Team Manager	Wayne Carter
Assistant Manager	Vacant

Last updated: 3 June 2024
Source: https://x.com/harrowboroLive/status/1797320040913526820?ref_src=twsrc%5Egoogle%7Ctwcamp%5Eserp%7Ctwgr%5Etweet

== Club records ==
=== Harrow Town FC ===
- Best FA Cup performance: Fourth qualifying round, 1960–61
- Biggest victory: 13–0 v Handley Page (A), 18 October 1941
- Biggest defeat: 0–8 (on five occasions)
- Largest attendance: 3,000 v Wealdstone, F.A. Cup, 1946

=== Harrow Borough FC ===
- Best FA Cup performance: Second round, 1983–84
- Best FA Trophy performance: Semi-finals (replay), 1982–83

== Sources ==
- Harrow Borough at the Football Club History Database
- Harrow Town at the Football Club History Database
