= Northwood F.C. =

Association football club in London

Coordinates: 51.6008°N 0.4157°W

Northwood
- Full name: Northwood Football Club
- Nickname: The Woods
- Founded: 1926; 100 years ago
- Ground: Skyline Roofing Stadium, Northwood Park, Northwood
- Capacity: 3,075 (308 seated)
- Chairman: Ian Barry
- Manager: Scott Patmore
- League: Combined Counties League Premier Division North
- 2025–26: Southern League Division One Central, 20th of 22 (relegated)
- Website: www.northwoodfc.com
Home colours	Away colours

Northwood Football Club is an English football club based in Northwood in the London Borough of Hillingdon. The club is affiliated to the Middlesex County Football Association. They play their home games at Northwood Park. The club are currently members of the Combined Counties League Premier Division North.

== History ==
=== Formation in 1926 and move into senior football ===
A club in the Northwood area was established in 1899, however Northwood as they are today were not believed to have been formed until 1926. Their early history is largely unknown and it is unclear what leagues they played in until 1931, when they joined the Harrow & Wembley League. They were champions of this league for six years in a row just prior to World War II and three more times after the war. This success did not last, however, and the 1950s and 1960s were mainly spent playing local junior-level football. In 1969, the Woods joined the Middlesex County Senior League. Northwood began life as Northwood Rovers and later United, but after The Second World War they dropped the suffix, to become what they are today – simply Northwood FC.

In 1978, Northwood won the Middlesex League Championship and were able to step up to the Hellenic League Division One, which they won in their debut season. This led to promotion to the Premier Division, where they spent five, mostly mid-table, seasons.

=== Isthmian League status and further success, 1992–2003 ===
The club moved across the pyramid in 1984 to the London Spartan League, which was renamed back to the Spartan League in 1992. In an eight-season spell, Northwood finished in the top three on four occasions, culminating with the Premier Division title in the 1991–92 season, leading to admission to the Isthmian League in 1992. In 1994, the club progressed to the final of the Middlesex Senior Charity Cup but were beaten by Staines Town.

In the late 1990s and early 2000s, the club enjoyed their best spell in their history with strikers Lawrence Yaku, Steve Hale and Scott Fitzgerald – who joined Watford in 2003 – offering plenty of firepower. In fact, Yaku's tally of 54 goals in his first season (1999/2000) remains the most by any Woods player in a single season, and he sits second on the list of Northwood's all-time top goalscorers with 137 goals. Club legends Chris Gell – who made a club record 489 appearances for the club, and Dave Nolan who also played more than 400 games for the club, were also mainstays throughout the period and played a key part in the success.

=== Reaching Step 3 for the first time, 2003–2007 ===
Northwood gradually climbed through the divisions of the Isthmian League under Tony Choules winning the Isthmian Charity Shield in 2002, and then reaching the Premier Division in 2003 after winning the 2002/03 Isthmian Division One North.

In July 2004, Northwood played Watford in a pre-season friendly, a match best remembered for American defender Jay DeMerit's Northwood performance, which prompted then Watford manager Ray Lewington to offer him a trial, before signing him permanently. DeMerit went on to play in the Premier League with Watford and at the 2010 FIFA World Cup for the USA. DeMerit was the second Northwood player to join Watford in as many years, following Scott Fitzgerald.

Northwood were then switched to the Southern League in 2005, where they remained until 2007. However, after relegation from the Southern League Premier Division they were moved "sideways" to the Isthmian League Division One North. Despite relegation, Northwood did lift the 2006/07 Middlesex Senior Cup as they beat Conference South outfit Hayes 4–2 on penalties, although it was the only real bright point in a disappointing season. Since then Northwood have seen several managers come and go. Dave Anderson was the most successful in the late noughties as he helped the club finish 6th and 10th, in 2008–09 and 2009–10 respectively, and reach the FA Trophy first round proper for the first time ever, before departing in March 2010.

=== Return to the Southern League, 2010–2018 ===
Northwood were then shuffled across from the Isthmian League Division One North in 2010 to the Southern League Division One Central where they remained until 2018. When Anderson departed in March 2010, his assistant Mark Barnham took the reins at the club, but he resigned in November of the same year due to the poor league position and after a run of eleven games without a win stretching back to September.

Then (in November 2010), it was the turn of former Woods favourite Steve Hale to have his crack as manager at Chestnut Avenue, and despite instigating a brief turnaround in fortunes in late 2010 and early 2011, the form faded quickly and after a series of heavy defeats, and a run of just one win in twelve matches, he was dismissed in March 2011 following a 6–2 mauling at the hands of Biggleswade Town.

Northwood chairman Ian Barry acted quickly replacing Hale with 27-year-old Gary Meakin who arrived from Hillingdon Borough. Meakin enjoyed three spells as a Northwood player, making 47 appearances, and helped guide the team to safety with three games remaining. His first Northwood win came on 2 April 2011 – in what was his first home game in charge – as Northwood came from behind to beat Soham Town Rangers 2–1. Following their 1–1 draw with Aylesbury at Chestnut Avenue a fortnight later, the club's safety was confirmed, as results elsewhere went their way. Northwood competed in the same division in the 2011–12 campaign having just avoided relegation in 2010–11, finishing 20th – just one spot above the drop zone with 39 points from 42 games.

After Northwood managed to survive the drop the previous season, Meakin assembled a strong squad as he set about trying to improve the side's fortunes in the 2011–12 season. In the early part of the campaign, consistency was a problem as they slipped into mid-table in the league and crashed out of the FA Cup, FA Trophy and Middlesex Senior Cup at the first hurdle. However better fortunes were to follow in both the Southern League Cup and Middlesex Charity Cup as the Woods made decent progress. Top scorer and eventual Supporters Player of the Year Oliver Hawkins would prove the major catalyst in their assault up the table scoring several goals in a ten-game period.

Victory over Bedworth United on New Year's Eve saw Northwood move into the play-off places for the first and only time in the season. The club were then knocked out of the League Cup by Chesham United but did progress to the semi-finals of the Middlesex Charity Cup setting up a meeting with near neighbours Uxbridge. A dip in form around the February/March time saw Northwood seemingly slip out of play-off contention, yet hard fought wins over several top half teams saw the side close the gap. Spencer Bellotti who had joined the Woods in February from Oxhey Jets scored a brace to send Meakin's side into their fourth Middlesex Charity Cup final appearance, this time against Ashford Town (Middlesex), aiming to lift the trophy for the first time following defeats in the 1994, 2003 and 2005 finals.

Bellotti followed up that superb showing to net a last gasp winner at home to Burnham in the penultimate game of the league season to take the race for the last play-off position down to the final game, although the Woods would let that slip away against Leighton Town as they conceded four times in the opening half-hour to narrowly fall short of a top five finish, ending up in a respectable 7th position.

Undeterred by their heavy final day defeat, Northwood raced into a 2–0 half time lead in the Middlesex Charity Cup final thanks to goals from Lee Grant and Oliver Hawkins. And when – two minutes after the interval – Hawkins scored his second it appeared the trophy was heading to Chestnut Avenue for the first time. Yet, young Ashford striker Kofi Lockhart-Adams scored four times in twenty minutes to give his side an unlikely 4–3 lead with minutes to go. Romaine Walker scored a late leveller to take the game to penalties, but Jack Hutchinson and Walker saw their spot kicks saved, and Ashford subsequently claimed the trophy.

Meakin kept much of his squad intact from the previous season which saw a dramatic turnaround in fortunes for the club, and even signed two players to contracts. Northwood also faced Chelsea's Under 21s in a bumper pre-season friendly that ended in a creditable 0–0 draw. But, in November 2012, after a solid start to the season, Meakin left to step up and take the reins at Isthmian League Premier Division side Wingate & Finchley.

==== Burgess takes charge ====
On 14 November 2012, former Northwood player Mark Burgess, who had a spell as player-caretaker manager after Mark Barnham's departure in 2010, was appointed as Meakin's successor. Northwood finished the 2012–13 campaign in a solid position of 13th, six places and nine points worse than their finish in 2012.

In the 2013–14 season, player-manager Mark Burgess, in his first full season in charge, had Northwood in 7th place around the Christmas period. But having been in contention for the play-offs for most of 2014, Northwood's form took a turn for the worse, ending their hopes of finishing in the top five as they finished the 2013–14 season in 9th.

In the 2014–15 season, Northwood recovered from an inconsistent first half of the season, to once again finish in the top half of the table, finishing in 10th place.

At the beginning of the 2015–16 season, Northwood made their best start to a league season since 1991–92 after winning their opening four league matches before that run was ended by Aylesbury United. They responded, however, by beating the same opponents 2–1 in the FA Cup preliminary round in August 2015, overseen by former Watford midfielder Jamie Hand due to the absence of Burgess and assistant Simon Huggett.

Northwood would later progress to the final of the Middlesex Senior Cup in 2016 for the first time since 2007, when the club won the competition, knocking out Hendon, Spelthorne Sports and Staines Town en route to the final. Northwood then secured their second ever Middlesex Senior Cup title with a 2–0 win in the final against Enfield Town on 7 May 2016, handing them their first silverware since they last lifted the competition nine years earlier. The cup success was therefore both player/manager Mark Burgess's first as a manager and first in charge of Northwood.

Having flirted with the play-off positions, Northwood finished eight points adrift in 7th place in the league, during a successful 2015–16 season.

In June 2016, the club appointed former Watford and Stoke City striker Gifton Noel-Williams to be their Reserves and Under-18's manager. It was expected that there would be closer ties between the first team and the other age groups at the club, a vision spearheaded by chairman Ian Barry. However, in early October, Noel-Williams left his role and Dave Fox was re-appointed shortly after. Manager Mark Burgess suffered the blow of losing eight of the 2015–16 squad, including George Nicholas, Max Holland, player of the year Andy Lomas and captain Steve Brown to Harrow Borough in the summer of 2016.

The 2016–17 season would prove to be a difficult one on the pitch as Northwood struggled to build on their excellent 2015–16 campaign. The team were in mid table around the Christmas period, but a dreadful run of just one win in 2017 (against bottom club Petersfield Town) and seven points from their final 21 league fixtures saw the club sucked into a relegation battle. A late rally by Histon left Northwood just four points above relegation heading into the final weeks with survival only secured on the penultimate weekend of the season. The club finished in 20th with 39 points – their lowest finish and points tally since the 2010–11 season when the club finished with the same number of points and in the same position. The poor end to the season resulted in the club parting company with Burgess after four-and-a-half years in the role. In total, Burgess played well over 200 games over two spells with the club, also helping Northwood to the Middlesex Senior Cup in 2016.

==== Departure of Burgess and managerial changes ====
The departure of Burgess following a disappointing season led to an extensive search for his replacement, undertaken by chairman Ian Barry. His replacement was confirmed on 17 May 2017, with Simon Lane taking the hot-seat. Lane's career in non-league football was curtailed by injury, but he arrived with a wealth of experience at a higher level. Lane had previously served as manager at Berkhamsted Town and Windsor & Eton, coached at Maidenhead United, while most recently serving as Director of Football and manager with Wingate & Finchley. Lane surprisingly left his post in January 2018 to move to league counterparts Egham Town. Assistant Jake Heracleous took temporary charge before also departing due to being offered a role with Manchester United. Heracleous brought in ex-Bishop Stortford manager Gordon Boateng, and when Heracleous took the job opportunity he was offered with Manchester United, Boateng was then appointed manager until the end of the season.

=== Back to the Isthmian League, 2018–2024 ===
After finishing 17th in the 2017–18 season, Northwood returned to the Isthmian League after an eight-year absence – being placed in the newly created South Central division following the biggest shake-up of the Non-League pyramid since 2004.

With the club still searching for a permanent replacement for Simon Lane, chairman Ian Barry confirmed the arrival of Dean Barker as first team manager on 16 May 2018. Barker arrived from Wingate & Finchley where he had presided over their hugely successful Under 23s side. Northwood again faced a Chelsea youth age group side (Under 23s) in pre-season – their first meeting since 2012 – and won 1–0 thanks to a goal from James Ewington, clinching the Pete Barry Memorial Trophy. However, Barker's short stint in charge was over at the end of October 2018.

Barker's assistant Scott Dash then took charge between 2018 and 2019, before being replaced by Jamie Leacock. Former Northwood midfielder Rob Ursell then had a spell in charge between 2020 and 2021, a stint largely interrupted by Coronavirus pandemic related disruptions. Ursell left his post in April 2021.

In May 2021, former Ashford Town (Middlesex) manager Ben Murray was appointed as Northwood boss replacing Ursell. However, Murray would depart in November after a run of seven straight league defeats that left the side bottom of the league.

==== Bukowski and Ringrose take charge ====
In the same month, November 2021, Northwood announced the appointment of former Hendon and Hampton & Richmond coach Ben Bukowski as their new head coach. Also arriving as director of football was the vastly experienced Steve Ringrose, a former boss of local clubs Hillingdon Borough and North Greenford United. They were joined by ex-Woods player of the year Andy Lomas, and one-time Hendon and Potters Bar Town player Keagan Cole, who arrived as player/coaches.

The new management team successfully led Northwood away from relegation danger in the 2021–22 season and into an 11th-placed finish. The team also reached the semi-finals of both the Middlesex Senior Cup (losing to National League side Barnet) and the Middlesex Charity Cup.

In the 2022–23 season, Northwood won their opening six league games and were top of the South Central division table heading into Christmas.

The form dipped in the second half of the season, following the departure of forward and top scorer Sydney Ibie to Dagenham & Redbridge. However, Northwood rallied to finish inside of the play-off positions for the first time, finishing 5th with 20 wins from 38 games and a tally of 63 points. The Woods were narrowly beaten 2–1 in the play-off semi-final at Walton & Hersham, who went on to win promotion alongside league champions Basingstoke Town.

In 2023, Northwood also reached the final of the Middlesex Charity Cup for the first time since 2012, a competition the Woods have never previously won. Unfortunately, the team slipped to a 1–0 defeat to Broadfields United in the final played at Uxbridge's Honeycroft ground, meaning the wait to lift the trophy for the first time goes on.

The club struggled for consistency in the 2023–24 season, finishing in 15th. After the season, Bukowski left Northwood after two-and-a-half years in charge to take the manager's position at neighbours Harrow Borough.

=== Southern League struggles, 2024–2026 ===
Ahead of the 2024–25 season, Northwood were moved sideways into the Southern League for the first time since 2018, after six years as Isthmian League members.

Then, in June 2024, Northwood announced the appointment of former Queens Park Rangers and Wycombe Wanderers midfielder Scott Donnelly as their new manager, the 36-year-old's first managerial position. Donnelly had most recently coached at Rayners Lane. Donnelly was sacked in September having lost all nine competitive games he took charge of, including seven straight in the league.

An interim management team of Steve Ringrose, Ryan Young and Richard Elderfield took charge of five matches in all competitions, winning two, drawing one and losing two – a run which included Northwood's first league win of the season, a 2–1 success at Beaconsfield Town.

Then, in late October 2024, Northwood announced the appointment of Gary Meakin as the club's new manager – who returned for a second spell in charge, almost 12 years after his first one ended. Meakin had most recently led Rayners Lane to promotion to Step 4 for the first time in their history, alongside winning the Middlesex Senior Cup, and before that enjoyed a long spell at Beaconsfield Town and a successful stint at Egham Town.

However, Meakin would announce his resignation on 22 March 2025 after a 2–0 defeat at home to Flackwell Heath saw Northwood slip into the Division One Central relegation places. It was Northwood's sixth straight league defeat.

Two of Northwood's senior players Jon-Jo Bates and Jack Smith then took interim charge until the end of the season. In nine matches under Bates and Smith, the club collected 17 points – largely thanks to four successive league victories in April – which helped secure Northwood's Step 4 status as they stayed up by two points, finishing 16th.

The strong end to the season saw Jon-Jo Bates and Jack Smith confirmed as permanent joint managers in May 2025. However, on 25 January 2026 Northwood parted company with Bates and Smith following a 2–0 defeat at Marlow, a result that saw the club slip into the bottom four relegation places with 15 games to go.

Assistant manager Dennis Quigley took charge of two matches, before the club confirmed the appointment of Tommy Cooney as their new manager. Cooney arrived from Step 5 side Arlesey Town on 25 February 2026.

However on Easter Monday 2026, Northwood's long stay at Step 4 came to an end after they were relegated following a 4–4 draw at Beaconsfield Town. It was Northwood's first relegation since 2007, returning them to Step 5 for the first time since the 1990s.

Cooney tendered his resignation in May 2026 citing the club's impending placement at Step 5 in the Combined Counties Football League, rather than the Spartan South Midlands Football League, as the reason for his departure.

=== Life at Step 5, 2026– ===
In May 2026, Northwood were confirmed as having been placed in the Combined Counties Premier Division North for the 2026–2027 season.

In the same month, the club confirmed the appointment of Manny Williams as the club's new manager. The 44-year-old had enjoyed a long-career in non-league football, having most recently served as player-coach at Risborough Rangers.

On 1 September 2026, the day after a 4–2 loss in the league at home to local rivals Harefield United, Northwood parted ways with Manny Williams. The club had started slowly after lots of changes to the squad over the summer. They picked up four points from their first five games, and exited the FA Cup early to debutants Hutton in the Extra Preliminary Round.

On 11 September 2026, Northwood confirmed the appointment of Scott Patmore as manager. Patmore arrived from Spartan South Midlands Premier Division side AFC Welwyn, having previously managed Edgware & Kingsbury and Rayners Lane.

== Stadium ==
The club plays their home games at the Skyline Roofing Stadium, Northwood Park, Northwood Recreation Ground, off Chestnut Avenue, Northwood, Middlesex, HA6 1HR.

The stadium (known informally as Northwood Park or Chestnut Avenue) is also home to the Northwood Under-18 midweek side, and was ground-shared by Step 6 Combined Counties Division One sides Spartans Youth and Rising Ballers Kensington until 2024 and 2026 respectively, and Middlesex County League side Hayes & Hillingdon FC from 2024 until 2025. Hayes & Hillingdon returned to Northwood ahead of the 2026–27 season.

It has a capacity of 3,075, of which there are around 900 terraced places and approximately 250 seats. The stadium was officially opened in 1978, as prior to this Northwood had played on local playing fields in the surrounding park area.

Significant work and investment has been made at the stadium in recent years, with the refurbishment of the clubhouse facilities, the refurbishment and renaming of the main stand as the 'Byrne Stand' and, in 2022, the official opening of a new stand (the Pat Byrne Memorial Stand, named in memory of the late club life president of Northwood FC, Pat Byrne) to the side of the dugouts.

The highest attendance at the ground is recorded as 1,642 for a friendly match versus a Chelsea XI in 1997.

== Club records ==
- Best league performance: 17th in Isthmian League Premier Division, 2004–05
- Best FA Cup performance: 4th qualifying round, 2000–01
- Best FA Trophy performance: 1st round, 2009–10
- Best FA Vase performance: Quarter-finals, 1996–97
- Biggest attendance: 1,642 versus a Chelsea XI in 1997
- All-time top goalscorer: Martin Ellis – 156 goals, 1976–85
- Club record appearance holder: Chris Gell – 489 appearances, 1994–04, 2005–06
- Most goals in a single season: Lawrence Yaku – 54, 1999–00 (including cup games)

== Honours ==
- Harrow, Wembley & District League
  - Premier Division Champions (7): 1932–33, 1933–34, 1934–35, 1935–36, 1936–37, 1947–48, 1948–49
  - Senior Challenge Cup winners (6): 1932–33, 1935–36, 1936–37, 1947–48, 1948–49, 1969–70
  - Senior Charity Cup winners (3): 1947–48, 1953–54, 1988–89
  - Memorial Shield winners (1): 1969–70
- Northwood Hospital Charity Cup
  - Winners (4): 1932–33, 1937–38, 1939–40, 1954–55
- Hellenic League
  - Division One Champions (1): 1978–79
  - Hellenic League Division One Cup winners (1): 1978–79
- Spartan League
  - Premier Division Champions (1): 1991–92
  - London Spartan League Cup winners (2): 1989–90, 1991–92
- Vandanel Associate Members Trophy
  - Winners (2): 1992–93, 1999–00
- Isthmian League
  - League Cup winners (1): 2001–02
  - Charity Shield winners (1): 2001–02
  - Division One North Champions (1): 2002–03
- Middlesex League
  - Premier Division Champions (1): 1977–78
  - League Cup Winners (3): 1974–75, 1976–77, 1977–78
- Middlesex Junior Cup
  - Winners (1): 1937–38
    - Runners Up (2): 1934–35, 1935–36
- Middlesex Intermediate Cup
  - Winners (1): 1978–79
- Middlesex Senior Cup
  - Winners (2): 2006–07, 2015–16
    - Runners Up (2): 1999–00, 2001–02
- Middlesex Charity Cup
  - Runners Up (5): 1993–94, 2002–03, 2004–05, 2011–12, 2022–23

== Selected managers ==
- Pat Coburn 1976–86 (Northwood's longest serving manager)
- Tony Choules 1997–04 (Arguably Northwood's most successful manager, most recently at Egham Town)
- Colin Payne 2005–08 (Won Middlesex Senior Cup in 2007)
- Dave Anderson 2008–10
- Gary Meakin 2011–12 & 2024–25 (Runners-up in the Middlesex Charity Cup in 2012)
- Mark Burgess 2012–17 (Three top ten finishes; also won the Middlesex Senior Cup in 2016)
- Ben Bukowski 2021–24 (Led Northwood to first ever play-off appearance and to runners-up in Middlesex Charity Cup in 2023)

== Management team ==
Position	Staff
Director of Football	Steve Ringrose
Manager	Scott Patmore
Assistant Manager	Connor Kilker
First Team Coach	Matt See
Physio	Gus Payne
Kit Manager	TBC

Last updated: 24 June 2026
Source: https://www.northwoodfc.com/whos-who.html

== First-team squad ==
As of 22 November 2026

Note: Flags indicate national team as defined under FIFA eligibility rules; some limited exceptions apply. Players may hold more than one non-FIFA nationality.

No.	Pos.	Nation	Player
—	GK	ENG	Kacper Orlowski (dual-registration with Uxbridge)
—	GK	ENG	Bradley Monks (dual-registration with Welwyn Garden City)
—	GK	ENG	Noah Vaughan
—	GK	ENG	Charlie Mawson-Smith (dual-registration with Hanwell Town)
—	GK	ENG	Lewis Everett
—	DF	AIA	Kieron Lake-Bryan
—	DF	ENG	Simeon Olarerin (dual-registration with Hitchin Town)
—	DF	ENG	Rafiq Bettamer
—	DF	ENG	Johnny Wilson (Captain)
—	DF	ENG	Tomas Gunasekera
—	DF	ENG	Lewis Buamah
—	DF/MF	ENG	Kevin Mustali
—	DF/MF	ENG	Sankou Jabbi (dual-registration with Leverstock Green)
—	MF/DF	ENG	Adeyemi Adewale
—	MF	CIV	Amara Fofana

No.	Pos.	Nation	Player
—	MF	ENG	Josh Havard
—	MF	AIA	Kayne Connor
—	MF	ENG	Ronny Mfinda
—	MF	BRA	Jonathan Moura
—	MF	ENG	James King
—	MF	ENG	Arnold Mengi
—	MF	UKR	Maksym Fostyk
—	MF	ENG	Lucas Da Silva Luz
—	MF	ENG	Javan Campbell
—	MF	ENG	Parris Mason (dual-registration with Harrow Borough)
—	MF/FW	ENG	Mark Osei
—	MF/FW	ENG	Kjay Bailey (dual-registration with Harrow Borough)
—	FW	ENG	Ilyas Khader
—	FW	ENG	Rowan Daly
—	FW	ALB	Fabjan Toci
—	FW	ENG	Guiseppe Delgaudio

== Sources ==
- Northwood at the Football Club History Database
  - Northwood F C | Woods 100 Club
- Northwood F C | Club Honours
- Northwood F C | Goalscorers 50+ Club
- Squad
- Northwood F C | Club Information
- Who's who
