= Phil Williams (presenter) =

British radio presenter (born 1974)

- Born: 2 August 1974 (age 51)
- Occupation: Radio presenter

Phil Williams (born 2 August 1974) is a British radio news reporter and presenter who worked for 18 years on BBC Radio 5 Live until 2019.

He attended King Edward VI School for Boys (Aston) between 1985 and 1992

A graduate of the BBC trainee reporters scheme, Williams soon joined the corporation's Greater Manchester Radio (GMR) station as a newsreader and presenter. His time at the station included reporting in the immediate aftermath of a Provisional IRA bombing in the city.

Three years in a similar role at BBC Radio 1 followed before Williams transferred to Radio 5 Live, initially as an entertainment reporter. He formerly hosted the Weekend Breakfast show, firstly with Anna Foster, and then with Eleanor Oldroyd on Saturdays and with Caroline Barker on Sundays. From 13 May 2013 he switched to the late-night show – presenting the show from Mondays to Wednesdays, 10:30 pm – 1 am, and also on Thursdays 10 pm – 1 am, when BBC One's political discussion show Question Time was off-season. He left the station after presenting his final programme on 8 May 2019. In November 2019, he stood in for OJ Borg on BBC Radio 2's late night show.

Williams previously presented a show on commercial station XFM London, running from 10 am to 2 pm every Sunday.

Beginning in June 2020, he started presenting an evening show, Monday to Thursday, on the digital radio station Times Radio. He left the station in June 2022.

Williams supports Aston Villa F.C.

Williams serves as a cover presenter on BBC Radio 2, substituting for OJ Borg on weekday programmes airing from 12–3 am.
