= David Howell (footballer) =

English footballer & manager (born 1958)

Personal information
- Full name: David Christopher Howell
- Date of birth: 10 October 1958 (age 68)
- Place of birth: Hammersmith, England
- Position: Centre back

Youth career
- 1978: Fulham

Senior career*
| Years | Team | Apps | (Gls) |
- Hillingdon Borough
- Hounslow Town
- Harrow Borough
| 1984–1990 | Enfield | 201 | (23) |
| 1990–1993 | Barnet | 78 | (4) |
| 1993–1994 | Southend United | 6 | (0) |
| 1994 | Birmingham City | 2 | (0) |
| 1995 | Stevenage Borough | 1 | (0) |

International career
| 1986–1990 | England semi-pro | 14 | (2) |

Managerial career
- 2003–2011: Harrow Borough
- 2011–2012: St Albans City
- * Club domestic league appearances and goals

David Howell (born 10 October 1958) is an English former footballer who played as a central defender. He played non-league football for many years, becoming the first black captain of the England Semi-Professional Team, until making his Football League debut with Barnet at the age of 32. He later spent several years as manager of Harrow Borough.

== Playing career ==
Howell started his professional career with Fulham in 1978, but failed to reach the first team. He then moved on to various non-league clubs, including Harrow Borough (whom he helped win the 1984 Isthmian League Premier Division Championship), Hounslow Town, Hillingdon Borough and Enfield. He was also a Semi-pro international, achieving the honour of being the first black England Semi-Professional Team captain.

In July 1990 Howell joined Conference club Barnet for £10,000. He made his debut as a substitute on 18 August 1990 at Macclesfield Town, and scored a headed goal on the final day of the 1990-91 season to help Barnet win the title and thereby gain promotion to the Football League Fourth Division.

In 1991-92 he made 34 appearances, scoring 3 goals as Barnet reached 7th place, but failed to gain promotion via the play-offs losing to Blackpool. However David was voted Player of the Year by the Barnet Football Club Supporters Association. In the following season (1992-93) he made a further 23 appearances as Barnet finished 3rd in the renamed Barclays League Division 3, thereby gaining promotion to Division 2.

In July 1993 he joined Division 1 team Southend United for whom he made 6 appearances. There, Dave became the oldest player ever at the time to sign a full professional playing contract for the first time superseding Tony Book of Manchester City. At the end of the 1993–94 season he was released and in October 1994 (now aged 36) he joined Birmingham City on a non-contract basis, playing twice for them in division 2.

Howell then played for Stevenage Borough before retiring as a player.

== Managerial career ==
Whilst at Barnet, Southend United and Birmingham City, Howell worked with Barry Fry and Edwin Stein as part of the management team. He later returned to Harrow Borough as assistant manager to Stein. In November 2003 he took over as caretaker manager to take the position permanently in the following February. In June 2011 he left Harrow Borough after leading them to their best season, in recent times, to become manager of the recently relegated St Albans City, who would be playing in the Southern Football League in the 2011–12 season. Howell was sacked as St Albans City manager in November 2012.

== Honours ==
Enfield

- FA Trophy
- APL championship

Barnet

- Football Conference
