= The Non-League Football Show =

BBC Radio 5 Live programme

- Genre: Sports
- Format: Podcast
- Country of origin: United Kingdom
- Language: English

Cast and voices
- Hosted by: Caroline Barker & Tim Fuell

Publication
- Provider: audioBoom, Jibba Jabba
- Updates: Weekly

Related
- Website: http://www.nonleaguefootballshow.com

The Non-League Football Show is a weekly podcast. The show covers news and features from non-league football, that is, club football played in England at levels below The Football League.

The presenter since its launch in 2006 has been Caroline Barker, with former Producer Tim Fuell assuming the main presenting role from 2016. The main presenter is usually accompanied each week by between one and two studio contributors, often from a mixture of regulars and special guests as well as two to four telephone guests from the world of non league football.

The Non-League Football Show was originally broadcast on BBC London 94.9. It was moved to Radio 5 in August 2012, broadcasting at 05:30am. An extended edition was also available as a podcast and the show has peaked at number 29 in the UK iTunes chart. In August 2016, the BBC decided not to commission any more of the shows however it continues as an independent podcast.

The show has strong connections to non-league football, with Barker having previously been a director at Chelmsford City. Many of the guests and regular contributors work or have worked in non-league football. Frequent contributors since the shows launch include Dave Watters, a football journalist who works in public-relations for the Northern Premier League and Southern Premier League, and Dave Anderson, who has managed several non-league clubs. 'Swampy' of FC United of Manchester radio appeared on the show during its time on Radio 5. Contributors from the programme's Radio London days include Alan Alger during his time working for the Blue Square Conference and Willie Wordsworth, former player and manager.
