= Hampton & Richmond Borough F.C. =

Association football club in London, England

Coordinates: 51°24′56″N 0°21′48″W

Hampton & Richmond Borough
- Full name: Hampton & Richmond Borough Football Club
- Nickname: The Beavers
- Founded: 1921; 105 years ago (as Hampton)
- Ground: Beveree Stadium, Hampton, London
- Capacity: 3,800 (644 seated)
- Chairman: Ben Hudson
- Manager: Richard Thomas
- League: National League South
- 2025–26: National League South, 18th of 24
- Website: hamrichfc.com
Home colours	Away colours

Hampton & Richmond Borough Football Club is a semi-professional association football club based in the suburb of Hampton, in the London Borough of Richmond upon Thames, England. The team competes in the National League South, the sixth level of the English football league system.

They were founded in 1921 and formerly known as Hampton FC until 1999 when they changed their name in an attempt to draw a wider support base from around the borough. Hampton & Richmond Borough remains the only senior-level football club to represent the borough of Richmond upon Thames.

== History ==
=== Early years ===
Hampton's early years were spent in the Kingston & District and the South West Middlesex Leagues. Although twice winning the Kingston & District title in the early 1930s the club never managed to capture the South West Middlesex League title during their 26-year stay.

=== Senior football ===
In 1959, Hampton entered the senior football ranks as members of the Surrey Senior League, despite being based in Middlesex. In 1964 they won the championship and stepped up into the Spartan League where they enjoyed seven seasons of unparalleled success. The club captured the Spartan League title four times in 1965, 1966, 1967 and 1970 as well as finishing runners-up in 1968. They never finished outside the top four places during their stay.

In 1971 they were elected to the Second Division of the Athenian League. After narrowly missing promotion in their first season, Hampton finished runners-up to Ruislip Manor in 1973. By this time, though, the Beavers had already been elected to the newly formed Second Division (now First Division) of the Isthmian League.

=== Isthmian League to 2003 ===
The club were to remain in Division Two of the Isthmian League until 1990, when they suffered their first relegation. Worse was to follow as the two regionalised Second Divisions were split in 1991 to form a Second and Third set-up. The Beavers found themselves one place below the dividing line and were relegated to the Third Division for the 1991–92 season. Although missing automatic promotion by one place, the club was promoted at the Isthmian AGM to fill a vacancy in the Second Division and so began the recovery.

In the mid-1990s, under long-serving manager Chick Botley, the Beavers began to climb up the leagues again, winning promotion from the second division in 1995–96, and then gaining promotion from the first division in 1997–98 after finishing in 3rd place. Hampton started 1998–99 in the Premier Division – now the top tier of Isthmian League football. In 1999–00, they became the first winners of the George Ruffell Memorial Shield. They remained in the Premier Division until 2002–03, which led to relegation and a return to Division One.

=== The Devonshire years ===
In the summer of 2003, the club invited experienced manager Alan Devonshire, who had just left Maidenhead United, to Beveree. Alan signed as manager and had the task of winning promotion back to the Premier Division, this was achieved on the last day of his first season in charge with a 3–0 win at Leatherhead.

Hampton & Richmond Borough subsequently spent three seasons in the Premier Division, each time coming close to promotion to the Conference South after finishing as runners up in the play-off competition in 2005–06, and narrowly missing out on a play-off place in 2004–05. On 28 April 2007, Hampton & Richmond Borough were promoted as champions of the league to the Conference South after a 4–2 victory over Slough Town. The crowd of nearly 1,100 witnessed an epic match in which Hampton led 2–1 until a late Slough goal looked to have given the championship to promotion rivals, Bromley. This would have forced Hampton into 2nd place, meaning that they would have had to compete in the playoff competition for promotion. However, 90 seconds later Hampton retook the lead through a goal from Stuart Lake and shortly afterwards a penalty was awarded and scored by Elliott Godfrey, resulting in a 4–2 victory, and automatic promotion for the Beavers.

Hampton & Richmond Borough quickly established themselves in the Conference South in the sixth tier of English football. In 2007–08 they finished in 3rd position in the league, reaching the play-off final which was narrowly lost to Eastbourne Borough. The following season they suffered yet more heartbreak in the play-off final, losing 2–3 at their home ground to Hayes & Yeading United, having qualified as runners-up to AFC Wimbledon. A curious fact is that both AFC Wimbledon and Hayes & Yeading United found out they would be going up at Hampton's Beveree ground. The club also reached the First Round Proper of the FA Cup for only the second time in their history in 2007, losing to League Two side, Dagenham & Redbridge in front of over 2,000 fans.

The club recorded its first record attendance at the start of the 2008–09 season when Hampton entertained a full strength West Ham United side that included Dean Ashton, Craig Bellamy and Robert Green. West Ham ran out 4–2 winners in front of a crowd of over 3,000. Since then, several matches, including the Conference South play-off final in May 2009, have been played in front of capacity crowds. The play-off even recorded more than 1,000 people who couldn't get into the stadium for the match.

On 29 January 2009 the club received a record transfer fee for its 20-year-old striker Ben Wright as he moved to League One side Peterborough United. It had been widely reported that Wright was to make the move to Premier League Fulham, but Peterborough beat Fulham to the punch to sign up 'the hottest property in non-league football'. As part of the deal, the club received a substantial cash amount and would receive further funds based on goals and appearances for the Posh, as well as a sell-on fee. However Wright failed to impress.

=== After Devonshire ===
In May 2011, Devonshire accepted the position of first team manager at Braintree Town, who had just been promoted to the Conference National. In his place, Mark Harper, Devonshire's assistant in the 2010–11 season, was appointed to the position of first team manager for the club's 5th season in the Conference South.

In 2011–12, in progressing to the FA Trophy 3rd round, the club had had its best performance in England's premier non-league cup competition. However, they suffered in the league and were relegated on the final day of the season.

The following season, 2012–13, started off brightly in the Isthmian League Premier Division, as the club were looking for immediate promotion back to the Conference South. However, the good form disappeared and after a 3–0 defeat to bottom team Carshalton Athletic on 1 April, Mark Harper resigned his position as first team manager. The management for the remaining games of the season was handed to first team coach Paul Barry and player Darren Powell. The pair subsequently were appointed in the position permanently.

After a poor start to the 2014–15 season, Barry and Powell resigned on 13 September, following a 3–2 defeat away to VCD Athletic in the FA Cup. Earlier that week, the club had suffered a 6–4 defeat at home to Leiston in the Isthmian League Premier Division.

=== The Dowson era ===
Former Kingstonian manager Alan Dowson was appointed to replace Barry and Powell the following day. After spending the rest of the 2014–15 season working to prevent relegation, ending the season in 15th, Dowson then guided the Beavers to the Isthmian League title in 2015–16.

A strong start to life in the National League South in the 2016–17 season saw Hampton's skilful young players step into the spotlight and in the January 2017 transfer window, leading scorers Jamal Lowe and Nicke Kabamba both signed for League Two club Portsmouth.

The team maintained that strong start, finishing the season in 7th and thus qualified for the end of season playoffs, albeit through the failure of the two clubs immediately above them to achieve correct ground gradings. They met eventual playoff winners in the two-legged semi-final, Ebbsfleet United, and lost 4–2 on aggregate.

After a poor start to the 2017–18 season, Hampton then went on an unbeaten run of 21 games, which took them into the playoff places by Christmas. They ended the season in 4th place and entered the playoffs. After beating Truro City 3–1 and Chelmsford City 1–0, they faced Braintree Town in the promotion final, held at Beveree. After extra time, the match ended 1–1, Braintree Town then winning the penalty shootout 4–3.

This turned out to be Alan Dowson's last game in charge of the team, as he left to take charge of Woking 2 days later.

=== Gary McCann ===
On 1 June 2018 Hampton announced the former Hendon manager, Gary McCann, as the new manager. During his time as manager he led the side to two FA Cup First Round appearances and one finish in the playoffs, however this season was curtailed due to COVID-19

=== December 2022 takeover ===
In December 2022, the club was taken over by Ramayana Ventures. Led by brothers Rafaele and Stefano Petruzzo, the company took over majority control of the club. Shortly after, on 1 January 2023, Manager Gary McCann was relieved of his duties. On 13 January 2023, Mel Gwinnett was appointed as First Team Manager and Head of Football Operations. Following Mel's appointment, the team were able to escape the relegation places, finishing 17th in the National League South for the 2022/23 season.

In March 2024, the club released a statement: "Hampton & Richmond Borough FC is delighted to announce that Ramayana Ventures Limited (RVL), parent company of the Club, will convert its loan of c. £1.4m into equity. The conversion will further strengthen the Club’s balance sheet making it essentially debt-free."

In 2023-24, Gwinnett guided the Beavers to a ninth-placed finish, having looked on course for a play-off place for most of the season. On 3 May 2024, it was announced Gwinnett would not resume his duties at Beveree next season.

=== Julian era ===
On 13 May 2024, Alan Julian was appointed as manager, having retired from playing earlier in the year.

In his first full season as Manager, the team managed to avoid relegation, finishing 18th in the National League South for the 2024-25 season, a drop of 9 places on the previous season (Hampton & Richmond finished 9th in the National League South for the 2023-24 season).

In May 2025, the club announced that Rafaele and Stefano Petruzzo would be stepping away from the club, and transferring the ownership of Hampton & Richmond Borough FC to a group of existing investors. As part of the statement released, club Chairman Ben Hudson said: “We’re delighted that shareholders already familiar with the club have stepped forward to invest significantly and continue the progress achieved under the guardianship of the Petruzzo Brothers. This marks a pivotal moment for the Beavers, ensuring a sustainable, community-focused future for our club, which proudly boasts 104 years of history. Our mission remains clear: to nurture a welcoming, entertaining environment for our supporters and to create opportunities for success on the pitch.”

On 1 December 2025, and after a run of over three months without a win, Julian departed Beveree by mutual consent.

=== Dowson revival era ===
On 8 December 2025, a week after going separate ways with former player and manager Alan Julian, Hampton announced the return of former manager Alan Dowson, who had previously managed the Beavers from 2014—2018 before departing for Woking FC.

Upon Dowson's return to Beveree, the team managed to avoid relegation, finishing 18th in the National League South for the 2025-26 season, for the second consecutive season.

On 12 October 2026, and after a poor start to the season, Dowson departed Beveree by mutual consent.

=== Post Dowson ===
On 10 November 2026, Richard Thomas was named as The Beavers' new manager.

== Stadium ==
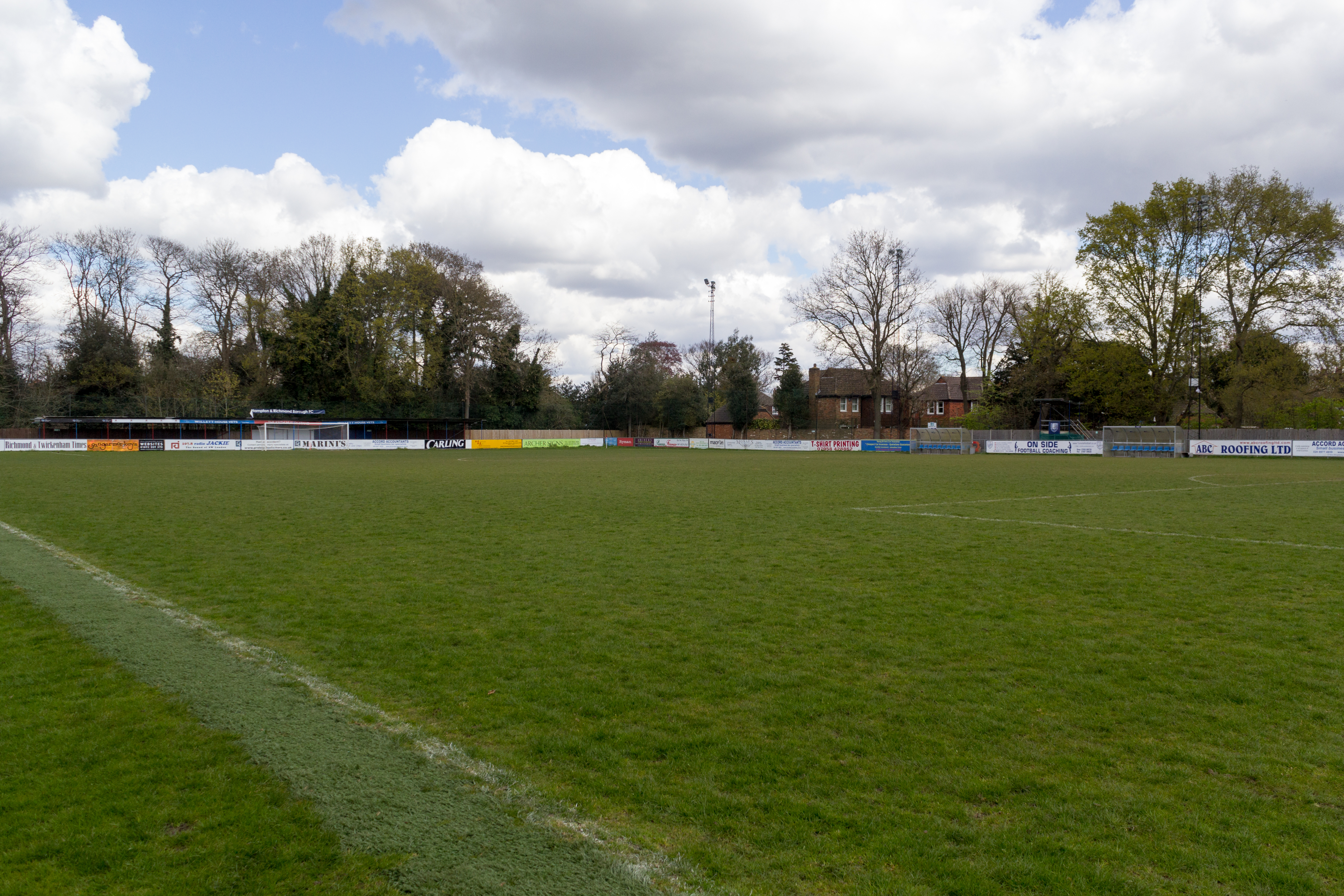
Hampton & Richmond Borough FC's Beveree Stadium (2016)

The home of Hampton & Richmond Borough is Beveree, Beaver Close, Hampton, Middlesex, TW12 2BX. It has a total capacity of 3,500, with roughly 640 of this being seated and 900 in covered terracing. On 11 October 2005, that capacity was tested with a crowd of 2,020 turning out for an Isthmian League match between Hampton & Richmond Borough and AFC Wimbledon. The match ended in a 2–1 victory for the home side.

On 18 April 2009, a record crowd of 3,225 turned up for the match against AFC Wimbledon which resulted in a 1–1 draw. This was topped with the Conference South Playoff Final of that season as a capacity crowd of 3,500 saw the Beavers denied a position in the Conference national by local rivals Hayes & Yeading United, as the visitors won 3–2.

Beveree, which can be shortened to 'the Bev', has been the home of the club since 1959. It is also the home of the Hampton & Richmond Borough Academy, plus other affiliated clubs such as Hampton & Richmond Borough Women F.C., Hampton Under 18s, Chelsea Ladies FC before May 2006; and the Hampton & Richmond Borough reserve team, which was restarted in 2008 after a four-year stretch with no reserve squad but was since discontinued in 2015.

Not just a football ground, Beveree is also used for social events. The club's ground has been used as a polling station for all local, general and European elections for a long time. In June 2006, work began on transforming the clubhouse and changing rooms at Beveree into a more modern facility. Work was completed by the end of summer, and the new look clubhouse was officially opened by FA Chief Executive, Brian Barwick, on 26 August 2006. The new facility has a pool table and flat screen TVs and is WiFi enabled.

In April 2008 the club received a Conference B grading for Beveree, following several weeks of work, which included the installation of additional toilet facilities, an extra turnstile, new dugouts and the extension of the Main Stand with 60 additional seats and the purchase of 250–seater semi-permanent stand. The B grading enables the club to remain in the Conference South.

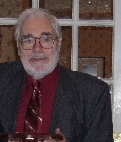
Alan Simpson OBE

The seating stand behind the goal at Beveree is named after Alan Simpson, known for co-writing Steptoe & Son, who was the president of Hampton & Richmond Borough Football Club for nearly 50 years.

In the Summer of 2025, the vintage floodlights from 1967 were upgraded, and a scoreboard at the Keith Hussey end of the ground was added.

The following summer saw ambitious plans announced by chairman Ben Hudson to renovate Beveree. “Phase One” renovation plans initially focused on first, academy and youth teams, and as a result, an artificial 3G pitch was laid. In addition, new walkways, fencing, expanded concourses, an upgraded car park and a family zone were also constructed.Chairman of the board of investors Scott Forbes said: "These changes will transition Beveree from a matchday venue to a campus that is available to a co-educational academy, local youth teams, local schools and community groups." The cover at the Keith Hussey end of the ground was dismantled, with the intention of installing a new seated stand behind the goal.

== The nickname ==
The club is nicknamed the Beavers and there is some debate as to its origins. The ground is known as Beveree – after the nearby house from whose grounds it was originally part of – and it lies adjacent to Beaver Close, which would seem to suggest as to where the tag originates although Beaver Close was built after the ground.

Following the renaming of the club from Hampton to Hampton & Richmond Borough, occasionally 'come on the Borough' is heard but generally, the fans prefer 'Beavers' to anything else, which is reflected in the naming of the club's youth group as the 'Hampton Beavers' and the supporters sometimes referring to themselves self-deprecatingly as the 'Beaver Patrol'. An alternative and somewhat humorous chant often heard emanating from the crowds behind the home goal is 'Up the Beavers'.

== Club rivals ==
Hampton & Richmond Borough's main football rivalry was with Staines Town. The two sides played against each other in the 'Thames-side Derby' many times, the most recent encounter being in Boxing Day 2016 when the Beavers won 3–2 at Beveree. The rivalry started around 40 years ago when the two sides played each other in a thrilling match. Thames-side Derby matches tended to attract a much-increased crowd figure. Staines would dissolve in 2022, due to financial mismanagement.

More recent and low-key local rivals, which have resulted from Hampton playing in the same division as the sides, are with AFC Wimbledon, Walton & Hersham, Molesey, Chertsey Town, Kingstonian, Walton Casuals (now folded), and Slough Town

== Records ==
The club's record victory is an 11–1 triumph over Eastbourne United in the division two South of the Isthmian League in 1990–91. Their record defeat is a 13–0 loss against Hounslow Town in the Middlesex Senior Cup in 1962–3.

Goalkeeper Alan Cooling's goal for the Beavers in the FA Cup 4th round qualifying against Barnet in November 1977 is thought to be the first goal scored by a goalkeeper in the FA Cup.

At the start of the 2012–13 season, the club extended a 45-year-old club record by going 7 consecutive games without conceding a goal; from the final game of the 2011–12 season in which they beat Thurrock 2–0, the team went a further 6 games into the 2012–13 season, before Lowestoft Town's Jack Defty scored in the 1–1 draw between the teams.

On Tuesday 22 March 2016 the Beavers took on Cockfosters FC at Beveree in a Middlesex FA Charity Cup match. The final score at the end of 90 minutes was 1–1 and the game was decided on kicks from the penalty spot. After 42 kicks were taken in total (21 each), Cockfosters' Courtney Lawrence beat Hampton keeper Adrian Blake to give the Fosters the win 18–17, after Hampton's Rylan Myers' kick had been saved by Fosters keeper Austin Byfield. This would later be confirmed as a record for most penalties taken in a shootout.

In the 2017–18 season, the Beavers also set the National League South record for the most draws in a season with 18 draws, beating the previous record of 17.

=== Cup records ===
==== Hampton FC ====
- Best FA Cup performance: Fourth qualifying round, 1977–78
- Best FA Trophy performance: First round, 1983–84, 1998–99
- Best FA Vase performance: Third round, 1991–92, 1995–96

==== Hampton and Richmond Borough FC ====
- Best FA Cup performance: First round, 2000–01, 2007–08, 2018–19, 2020–21
- Best FA Trophy performance: Fifth round, 2023–24

== Current squad ==
As of 30 October 2026

Note: Flags indicate national team as defined under FIFA eligibility rules; some limited exceptions apply. Players may hold more than one non-FIFA nationality.

No.	Pos.	Nation	Player
2	DF	ENG	Paul Field
3	DF	ENG	Harrison Sodje
4	DF	ENG	Will de Havilland (captain)
5	DF	ENG	Luis Fernandez
7	MF	ENG	Angel Waruih
8	MF	ENG	Wesley Fonguck
9	FW	IRL	Reece Grego-Cox
10	MF	ENG	Max Kretzschmar (player-coach)
11	MF	ENG	Maxwell Mullins
12	FW	ENG	Tobi Sho-Silva
13	GK	NZL	Jamie Searle
14	MF	ENG	Zanda Siziba

No.	Pos.	Nation	Player
15	FW	ENG	Jasper Mather
16	MF	ENG	Mike Atkinson
17	MF	WAL	Kiban Rai
18	MF	ENG	Bright Siaw (on loan from Barnet)
19	MF	ENG	Luca Barrington
20	GK	ENG	Marco Underwood (on loan from Fulham)
21	DF	POL	Ashley Akpan
22	DF	ENG	Ben Jackson
23	FW	IRL	Wilson Waweru (on loan from Wealdstone)
24	MF	MSR	Rohan Ince
25	MF	ENG	Hayden Barrett
26	DF	IRL	John Ryan (on loan from Reading)

=== Out on loan ===
Note: Flags indicate national team as defined under FIFA eligibility rules; some limited exceptions apply. Players may hold more than one non-FIFA nationality.

No.	Pos.	Nation	Player

== Non-playing staff ==
As of 12 October 2026

Position	Staff
Manager	Richard Thomas
Player/Assistant Manager	Max Kretzschmar
Head of Strength and Conditioning	Ryan Augustine
Goalkeeping Coach	Dave Roger
Assistant GK Coach	Adam Withers
Placement Coordinator	Jem Dennis
Physio	Liam Harper
Head of Recruitment	Tom Garcia
Director of Football & Business Development	Joe Monks

Source: https://hamrichfc.com/blogs/news/alan-dowson-signs-new-contract

== International players ==
Jamal Lowe – Estonia vs England C Lowe became the first player to represent England C while with the Beavers when he was selected to play in the International Challenge Trophy game in Tallinn. He was the only member of the squad to be selected from a National League South team.

In the starting line up, he scored the goal in the 13th minute that took the team to the ICT final against Slovakia in Spring 2017.

In 2022 Brandon Barzey was selected for the Montserrat national team. He made 3 appearances as a substitute for. In those appearances Brandon won 2 penalties, which were both converted by Montserrat captain Lyle Taylor.

In 2023 Forward Connor Kurran-Browne was again selected for the Guyana national team. This time making his debut for the Golden Jaguars again Bahamas in a 3–2 win.

In 2025 winger Carlos Richards joined on loan from Bromley, representing Gibraltar during his time at the Beveree.

== Managers ==
from 1959 to 1960 season when the club achieved Senior status

Name	From	To	Matches	Wins	Draws	Losses	Winning pct (%)
Alf Curle	1959-08-22	1960-05-05	39	14	7	18	35.9
Peter Tagg	1960-08-28	1966-03-19	258	156	35	67	60.5
Roy Philpott	1966-03-26	1974-04-30	510	279	96	135	54.7
Club Directors	1974-05-04	1974-05-18	7	0	2	5	0.0
Ted Murphy	1974-08-17	1979-05-08	306	122	68	116	39.8
Ron King	1979-08-04	1980-10-04	72	23	15	34	31.9
Club Directors	1980-10-05	1980-10-25	6	0	2	4	0.0
Roger Charland	1980-11-01	1985-05-02	255	109	51	95	42.7
Steve Rogers	1985-08-24	1988-11-08	210	91	46	73	43.3
Ted Murphy (caretaker)	1988-11-15	1988-11-26	3	1	0	2	33.3
Brian Laing	1988-12-03	1991-03-24	139	44	40	55	31.7
Tony Beadle	1991-03-30	1991-12-07	38	14	8	16	36.8
Mark Fewings	1991-12-10	1993-10-23	104	50	19	35	48.1
Jeff Hawkins (caretaker)	1993-10-24	1993-11-19	6	2	1	3	33.3
Paul Reynolds	1993-11-20	1994-03-26	23	6	1	16	26.1
Steve Cheshire (caretaker)	1994-03-27	1994-05-07	9	2	1	6	22.2
Chick Botley (1)	1994-08-13	1999-03-25	285	136	63	86	47.7
Tony Coombe (caretaker)	1999-03-25	1999-04-09	4	2	0	2	50.0
Steve Cordery	1999-04-10	2002-05-01	173	61	47	65	35.3
Ian McDonald	2002-07-01	2002-11-05	20	2	5	13	10.0
Chick Botley (2)	2002-11-06	2003-03-14	26	4	8	14	15.4
Brian Cottington (caretaker)	2003-03-15	2003-05-03	10	1	2	7	10.0
Alan Devonshire	2003-07-01	2011-05-23	444	215	101	128	48.4
Mark Harper	2011-05-24	2013-04-02	98	33	27	38	33.7
Paul Barry / Darren Powell	2013-04-03	2014-09-13	79	32	16	31	40.5
Alan Dowson (1)	2014-09-14	2018-05-16	211	101	56	54	47.9
Gary McCann	2018-06-01	2023-01-02	192	76	33	83	39.6
Steve Bates (caretaker)	2023-01-02	2023-01-13	2	0	1	1	0.0
Mel Gwinnett	2023-01-13	2024-05-03	69	32	14	23	46.4
Alan Julian	2024-05-13	2025-12-01	65	18	13	33	27.7
Alan Massey (caretaker)	2025-12-02	2025-12-08	1	1	0	0	100
Alan Dowson (2)	2025-12-08	2026-10-12	37	11	8	17	29.3
Max Kretzschmar / Craig Saunders	2026-10-13	2026-11-10	4	0	1	3	0
Richard Thomas	2026-11-10	present	1	0	0	1	0

Correct to 21-11-2026

== Most appearances ==
to end of 2017–18 season

Rank	Player	Starts	Sub	Total	Era
1	Tim Hollands	685	21	706	1977–1995
2	Alan Earl	560	9	569	1961–1977
3	Steve Cheshire	485	44	529	1986–99
4	Joe Andrews	495	0	495	1961–71
5	Malcolm Dickenson	450	2	452	1983–1994

== Leading scorers ==
to end of 2017–18 season

Rank	Player	League	Cup	Total	Era
1	Peter Allen	172	8	180	1964–76
2	Charlie Moone	111	7	118	2010–16
3	Peter Farren	112	3	115	1969–73
4	Ken Merry	107	2	109	1964–70
5	Lawrence Yaku	90	8	98	2005–11

== Honours ==
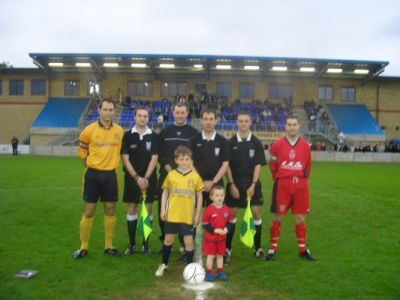
Hampton & Richmond vs Slough Town in the Isthmian League Cup final in 2005.

Hampton & Richmond Borough's most recent major honour is their Isthmian Premier League Championship victory of 2015–16. After heading the table in January, they fought a close battle with East Thurrock Utd and Bognor Regis Town, which was only settled on the final day of the season. A point from a hard-fought 0–0 draw at home to Enfield Town was enough to see them to the title as Bognor put in a late run, the Rocks ending a point behind the Beavers with the same goal difference.

In May 2014, the club also won the Middlesex Senior Cup following a 3–2 victory over Wealdstone, that season's Isthmian League champions. Their previous trophy outside of this had been the Middlesex Super Cup, a regional cup for the county of Middlesex, whereby the winners of the previous season's two local tournaments face each other. Hampton & Richmond won this on 10 October 2006, they entered as the Middlesex Senior Cup holders, and were victorious over Harrow Borough, the Middlesex Charity Cup holders. Hampton would go on to win the Senior Cup again in 2016-17.

League

- Conference South (level 6)
  - Runners-up: 2008–09
- Isthmian League Premier / Isthmian League Division One (level 7)
  - Champions: 2006–07, 2015–16
  - Promoted: 1997–98
- Isthmian League Division One South / Isthmian League Division Two (level 8)
  - Promoted: 1995–96, 2003–04
- Isthmian League Division Three (level 9)
  - Promoted: 1991–92
- Spartan League
  - Champions: 1964–65, 1965–66, 1966–67, 1969–70

Cup

- Isthmian League Cup
  - Runners-up: 2001–02, 2004–05
- Middlesex Senior Cup
  - Winners: 2005–06, 2007–08, 2011–12, 2013–14, 2016–17
  - Runners-up: 2004–05
- Middlesex Super Cup
  - Winners: 1999–2000, 2006–07
