= Caroline Barker =

British sports journalist (born 1981)

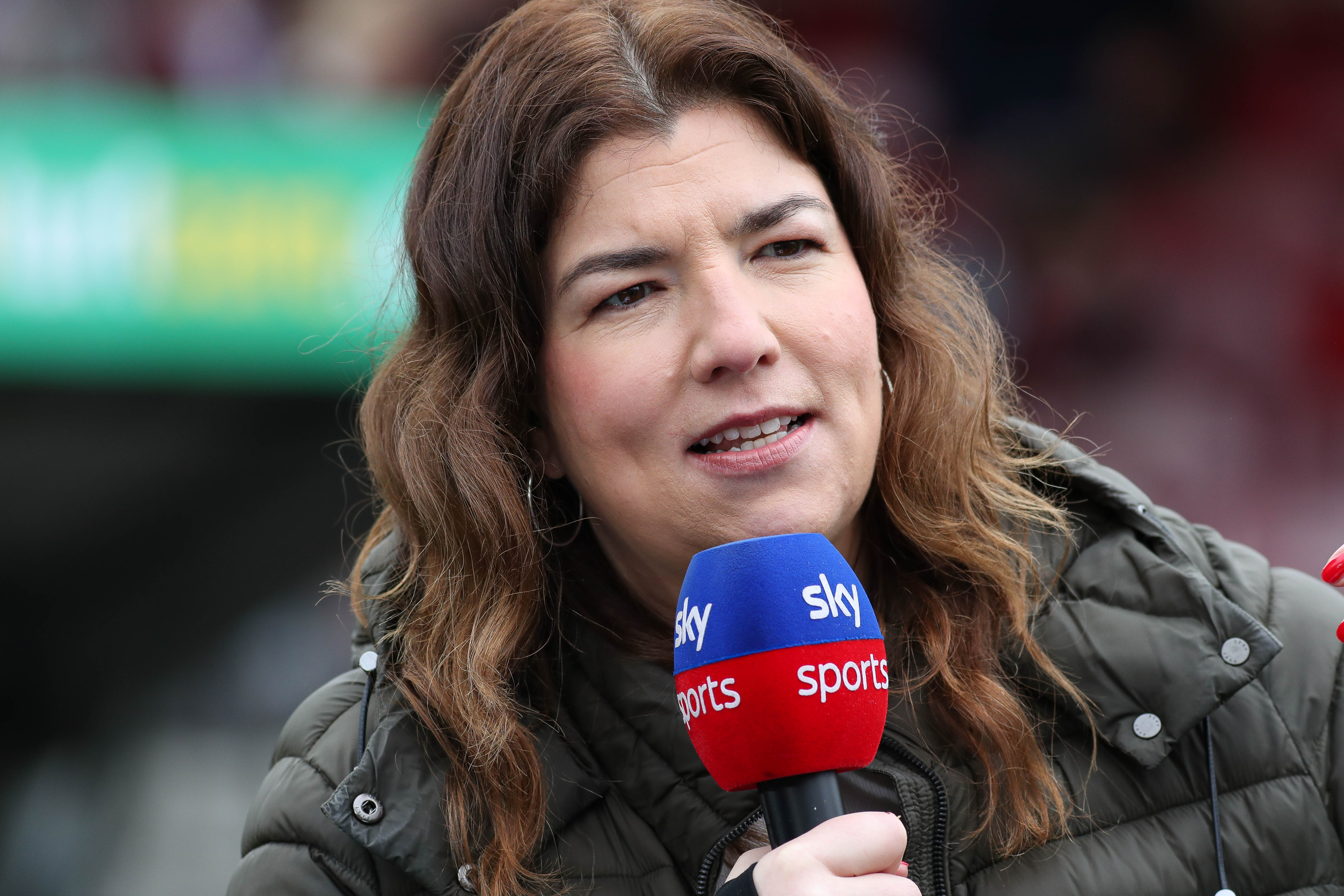
- Barker working for Sky Sports in April 2023
- Born: 1981 (age 44–45); Chelmsford, Essex, England
- Occupations: Sports journalist, Chelmsford City director (2009–2011)

Caroline Barker (born 1981) is a British sports journalist and broadcaster who works in television and radio. She currently presents mainly for BBC Radio 5 Live, BBC World Service, Sky Sports and Premier League Productions. Barker was the first female presenter of Match Day Live for Premier League Productions.

== Career ==
Barker first worked for BBC Essex, before joining BBC London 94.9 in 2004 as a sports reporter. While at BBC London, she worked as cover for sports reporters on BBC Radio 2 and BBC Radio 4. Beyond sports news, Barker presents the award-winning Sportshour for BBC World Service and was presenter of Sportsworld for the BBC World Service until 2015. Since 2014, she has regularly presented on programmes across BBC Radio 5 Live, covering on the 5 Live Sport, 5 Live Drive and Weekend Breakfast shows. She has become a frequent panellist on BBC 5 Live's sports comedy show Fighting Talk, winning the programme's "Rookie of the year award" in May 2015, and in the same year, led 5 Live's coverage of the Women's World Cup. She has since hosted the 2019 Women's World Cup for 5 Live. Barker is known for her love of fancy dress and she appeared in a parrot costume during a live edition of Fighting Talk broadcast from Cardiff. Barker has also acted as stand-in host of The Totally Football Show podcast in the absence of regular host, James Richardson, her first appearance being in February 2018. She now hosts The Totally Football League Show and football coverage for Sky Sports.

A fan of her hometown club Chelmsford City, Barker has long been a supporter of non-league football. She is the presenter of The Non-League Football Show, which she created for London 94.9 in 2006, moving with it to 5 Live in 2012. She is a director of the National League and was a founder member of the Non-League Footballers Association. From 2009 to 2011, she was a director at Chelmsford City.

As well as football, Barker is also commentator and analyst on netball, leading BBC coverage of the 2018 Commonwealth Gold winning team and for Sky Sports live coverage of the 2015 Netball World Cup. She is lead commentator for Sky Netball. She hosted the 2018 Champions League of Darts and 2019 Champions League of Darts on the BBC alongside Mark Webster and Paul Nicholson. She also covers the NFL International Series for BBC Sport.

In addition to her broadcasting, Barker founded and was director of digital content company JibbaJabba.
