= List of Dulwich Hamlet F.C. seasons =

List of Football Seasons of Dulwich Hamlet FC from UK

This is a list of seasons played by Dulwich Hamlet FC in English football, from the year they joined Isthmian League. and the Spartan League, to the present day. It details the club's record in first class competitions, for each season

== Seasons ==
Season	League	Pld	W	D	L	GF	GA	Pts	Pos	FA Cup	FA Trophy	FA Amateur
1906-07	-	-	-	-	-	-	-	-	-		-	R2
1907-08	Isthmian League	10	3	2	5	15	18	8	5th		-	
1907-08	Spartan League	10	4	1	5	19	20	9	4th		-	
1908-09	Isthmian League	18	9	2	7	39	30	20	4th		-	SF
1909-10	Isthmian League	18	8	4	6	26	26	20	5th		-	
1910-11	Isthmian League	18	8	5	5	28	22	21	3rd		-	
1911-12	Isthmian League	20	8	5	7	33	23	21	4th		-	QF
1912-13	Isthmian League	20	8	4	8	34	28	20	5th		-	
1913-14	Isthmian League	20	10	4	6	34	22	24	4th		-	QFr
1919	Isthmian League	8	3	2	3	19	17	8	3rd		-	
1919-20	Isthmian League	22	15	3	4	58	16	33	1st	5Q	-	W
1920-21	Isthmian League	22	11	6	5	60	30	28	5th	5Q	-	
1921-22	Isthmian League	26	14	8	4	65	24	36	2nd	5Q	-	SFr
1922-23	Isthmian League	26	9	7	10	60	44	25	8th	5Qr	-	QFr
1923-24	Isthmian League	26	15	6	5	49	28	36	2nd		-	
1924-25	Isthmian League	26	8	5	13	42	57	21	12th	5Q	-	
1925-26	Isthmian League	26	20	1	5	80	49	41	1st	R1	-	
1926-27	Isthmian League	26	9	4	13	60	58	22	9th	R1	-	QF
1927-28	Isthmian League	26	8	9	9	56	49	25	9th	R1	-	
1928-29	Isthmian League	26	14	6	6	65	34	34	3rd	R1	-	SF
1929-30	Isthmian League	26	15	6	5	74	39	36	2nd	R1	-	QF
1930-31	Isthmian League	26	12	9	5	51	39	33	2nd	R1r	-	
1931-32	Isthmian League	26	15	3	8	69	43	33	3rd	4Q	-	W
1932-33	Isthmian League	26	15	6	5	71	45	36	1st	R1	-	QF
1933-34	Isthmian League	26	15	5	6	68	36	35	2nd	R1r	-	SF
1934-35	Isthmian League	26	11	7	8	66	45	29	4th	R1	-	W
1935-36	Isthmian League	26	10	8	8	64	47	28	4th	R1	-	R3
1936-37	Isthmian League	26	12	6	8	64	48	30	5th	R1	-	W
1937-38	Isthmian League	26	13	3	10	57	46	29	6th	R1	-	QF
1938-39	Isthmian League	26	15	5	6	60	32	35	4th	4Q	-	
1945-46	Isthmian League	26	14	2	10	63	59	30	4th	4Q	-	
1946-47	Isthmian League	26	17	3	6	78	46	37	2nd	4Q	-	
1947-48	Isthmian League	26	17	2	7	71	39	36	4th	4Q	-	QF
1948-49	Isthmian League	26	15	6	5	60	31	36	1st	R1	-	
1949-50	Isthmian League	26	14	3	9	60	47	31	5th	4Qr	-	R3
1950-51	Isthmian League	26	14	2	10	54	43	30	5th	Pre	-	
1951-52	Isthmian League	26	11	4	11	60	53	26	8th		-	R3
1952-53	Isthmian League	28	15	2	11	62	52	32	6th	2Qr	-	
1953-54	Isthmian League	28	11	6	11	55	57	28	9th	1Q	-	
1954-55	Isthmian League	28	7	5	16	48	60	19	14th	1Qr	-	
1955-56	Isthmian League	28	9	6	13	55	67	24	13th	Pre	-	SF
1956-57	Isthmian League	28	13	3	14	65	54	29	9th	Pre	-	R3
1957-58	Isthmian League	30	7	7	16	49	64	21	14th	2Q	-	
1958-59	Isthmian League	30	18	5	7	68	44	41	2nd	1Q	-	
1959-60	Isthmian League	30	14	6	10	65	47	34	7th	1Q	-	
1960-61	Isthmian League	30	17	4	9	71	59	38	4th	2Q	-	
1961-62	Isthmian League	30	11	4	15	55	66	26	11th	4Q	-	
1962-63	Isthmian League	30	4	5	21	30	71	13	15th	3Q	-	
1963-64	Isthmian League	38	6	12	20	47	97	24	19th	1Q	-	
1964-65	Isthmian League	38	8	5	25	45	79	21	18th	1Qr	-	
1965-66	Isthmian League	38	5	5	28	30	95	15	20th	2Q	-	
1966-67	Isthmian League	38	3	4	31	33	107	10	20th	2Q	-	
1967-68	Isthmian League	38	10	7	21	39	66	27	15th	2Q	-	R2r
1968-69	Isthmian League	38	6	9	23	31	77	21	18th	1Q	-	R2
1969-70	Isthmian League	38	8	12	18	46	66	28	14th	1Q	-	
1970-71	Isthmian League	38	7	10	21	30	66	24	17th	2Q	-	R2r
1971-72	Isthmian League	40	4	12	24	35	81	20	20th	2Q	-	
1972-73	Isthmian League	42	18	9	15	59	52	45	12th	1Q	-	
1973-74	Isthmian Division One	42	22	11	9	71	38	77	4th	1Q	-	QFr
1974-75	Isthmian Division One	42	24	10	8	75	38	82	5th	1Q	3Q	-
1975-76	Isthmian Division One	42	22	5	15	67	41	71	5th	3Qr	R1	-
1976-77	Isthmian Division One	42	11	8	23	52	68	41	21st	3Q	3Q	-
1977-78	Isthmian Div One	42	28	9	5	91	25	93	1st	2Qr	2Q	-
1978-79	Isthmian Premier	42	21	13	8	69	39	76	4th	3Qr	3Q	-
1979-80	Isthmian Premier	42	21	16	5	66	37	79	3rd	2Q	QFr	-
1980-81	Isthmian Premier	42	13	12	17	62	67	51	15th	3Q	R1	-
1981-82	Isthmian Premier	42	14	10	18	47	59	52	14th	2Q	R1r	-
1982-83	Isthmian Premier	42	18	14	10	59	52	68	6th	3Qr	R2r	-
1983-84	Isthmian Premier	42	16	11	15	61	64	59	10th	2Q	R3r2	-
1984-85	Isthmian Premier	42	16	17	9	82	57	65	7th	1Q	R2	-
1985-86	Isthmian Premier	42	17	9	16	64	79	60	9th	2Qr	R1r	-
1986-87	Isthmian Premier	42	12	10	20	62	71	46	18th	2Q	R1	-
1987-88	Isthmian Premier	42	10	11	21	46	64	41	20th	1Q	3Q	-
1988-89	Isthmian Premier	42	12	12	18	58	57	48	16th	4Qr	2Q	-
1989-90	Isthmian Premier	42	6	8	28	32	80	26	22nd	4Qr	1Q	-
1990-91	Isthmian Div One	42	16	11	15	67	54	59	12th	1Q	1Qr	-
1991-92	Isthmian Div One	40	22	9	9	71	40	75	3rd	2Q	2Q	-
1992-93	Isthmian Premier	42	12	14	16	52	66	50	14th	1Q	3Q	-
1993-94	Isthmian Premier	42	13	8	21	52	74	47	16th	1Q	R1	-
1994-95	Isthmian Premier	42	16	9	17	70	82	57	11th	3Q	2Q	-
1995-96	Isthmian Premier	42	23	11	8	85	59	80	5th	3Q	1Qr2	-
1996-97	Isthmian Premier	42	14	13	15	57	57	55	12th	2Q	R2	-
1997-98	Isthmian Premier	42	13	11	18	56	67	50	16th	2Q	R1	-
1998-99	Isthmian Premier	42	14	8	20	53	63	20	16th	R1	R3	-
1999-00	Isthmian Premier	42	17	5	20	62	68	56	10th	4Qr	R2r	-
2000-01	Isthmian Premier	42	4	10	28	33	84	22	22nd	4Q	R1r	-
2001-02	Isthmian Div One	42	11	13	18	64	68	76	17th	Pre	R3	-
2002-03	Isthmian Div One South	46	23	12	11	73	49	81	4th	Pre(r)	R3	-
2003-04	Isthmian Div One South	46	23	15	8	77	57	84	7th	Pre	R1r	-
2004-05	Isthmian Div One	42	10	14	18	61	64	44	15th	3Q	R1r	-
2005-06	Isthmian Div One	44	19	8	17	55	43	65	13th	3Q	1Qr	-
2006-07	Isthmian Div One South	42	18	13	11	83	56	67	8th	1Q	Pre(r)	-
2007-08	Isthmian Div One South	42	20	10	12	68	47	70	6th	3Q	Pre	-
2008-09	Isthmian Div One South	42	15	15	12	64	50	57	12th	2Qr	2Q	-
2009-10	Isthmian Div One South	42	14	12	16	57	64	54	12th	1Q	Pre	-
2010-11	Isthmian Div One South	42	19	8	15	79	59	65	5th	Pre(r)	2Q	-
2011-12	Isthmian Div One South	40	26	8	6	73	26	86	3rd	2Q	1Q	-
2012-13	Isthmian Div One South	42	28	5	9	91	42	89	1st	2Q	Pre	-
2013-14	Isthmian Premier	46	25	7	14	96	65	82	6th	3Q	3Qr	-
2014-15	Isthmian Premier	46	21	13	12	66	51	76	4th	1Q	2Q	-
2015-16	Isthmian Premier	46	23	12	11	93	58	81	5th	2Q	R2	-
2016-17	Isthmian Premier	46	22	14	10	89	55	80	3rd	2Q	QFr	-
2017-18	Isthmian Premier	46	28	11	7	91	41	95	2nd	2Q	2Q	-
2018-19	National League South	42	23	10	19	52	65	49	14th	3Q	R1	-
2019-20	National League South	35	9	10	16	51	50	37	19th	R1	R1	-
2020-21	National League South	13	4	4	6	15	17	16	aband	4Q	R3	-
2021-22	National League South	40	13	12	15	63	60	51	10th	2Q	R3	-
2022-23	National League South	46	13	9	24	61	89	48	21st	3Q	R2	-
2023-24	Isthmian Premier	42	17	11	14	77	72	62	12th	1Qr	3Q	-
2024-25	Isthmian Premier	42	12	8	22	58	80	44	18th	1Qr	R1	-
2025-26	Isthmian Premier											-
	Total	S	Pld	W	D	L	GF	GA				
	Isthmian First Div	88	2898	1145	643	1110	4994	4693				
	Isthmian Second Div	15	636	292	162	182	1074	744				
	Spartan League	1	10	4	1	5	19	20				
	National League South	4	163	58	41	74	227	264				
TOTAL		108	3707	1499	847	1361	6314	5721				

== Key ==
Winners	Runners-up	Promoted	Relegated

Key to league record

- Pld = Matches played
- W = Matches won
- D = Matches drawn
- L = Matches lost
- GF = Goals for
- GA = Goals against
- Pts = Points
- Pos = Final position
- S = Seasons
- Isthmian First Div
  Isthmian League, Isthmian Division One, Isthmian Premier
- Isthmian Second Div
  Isthmian Div One, Isthmian Div One South

Key to cup records

- Pre = Preliminary Round
- Pre(r) = Preliminary reply
- 1Q = 1st Qualifying round
- 1Qr = 1st Qualifying round reply
- 1Qr2 = 1st Qualifying round 2nd reply
- 2Q = 2nd Qualifying round
- 2Qr = 2nd Qualifying round
- 3Q = 3rd Qualifying round
- 3Qr = 3rd Qualifying round reply
- 4Q = 4th Qualifying round
- 4Qr = 4th Qualifying round reply
- 5Q = 5th Qualifying round
- 5Qr = 5th Qualifying round reply

Key to cup records

- R1 = Round 1
- R1r = Round 1 reply
- R2 = Round 2
- R2r = Round 2 reply
- R3 = Round 3
- R3r = Round 3 reply
- R3r2 = Round 3 2nd reply
- QF = Quarter-finals
- QFr = Quarter-finals reply
- SF: Semi-finals
- SFr = Semi-finals reply
- W = Winners
