= List of Sutton United F.C. seasons =

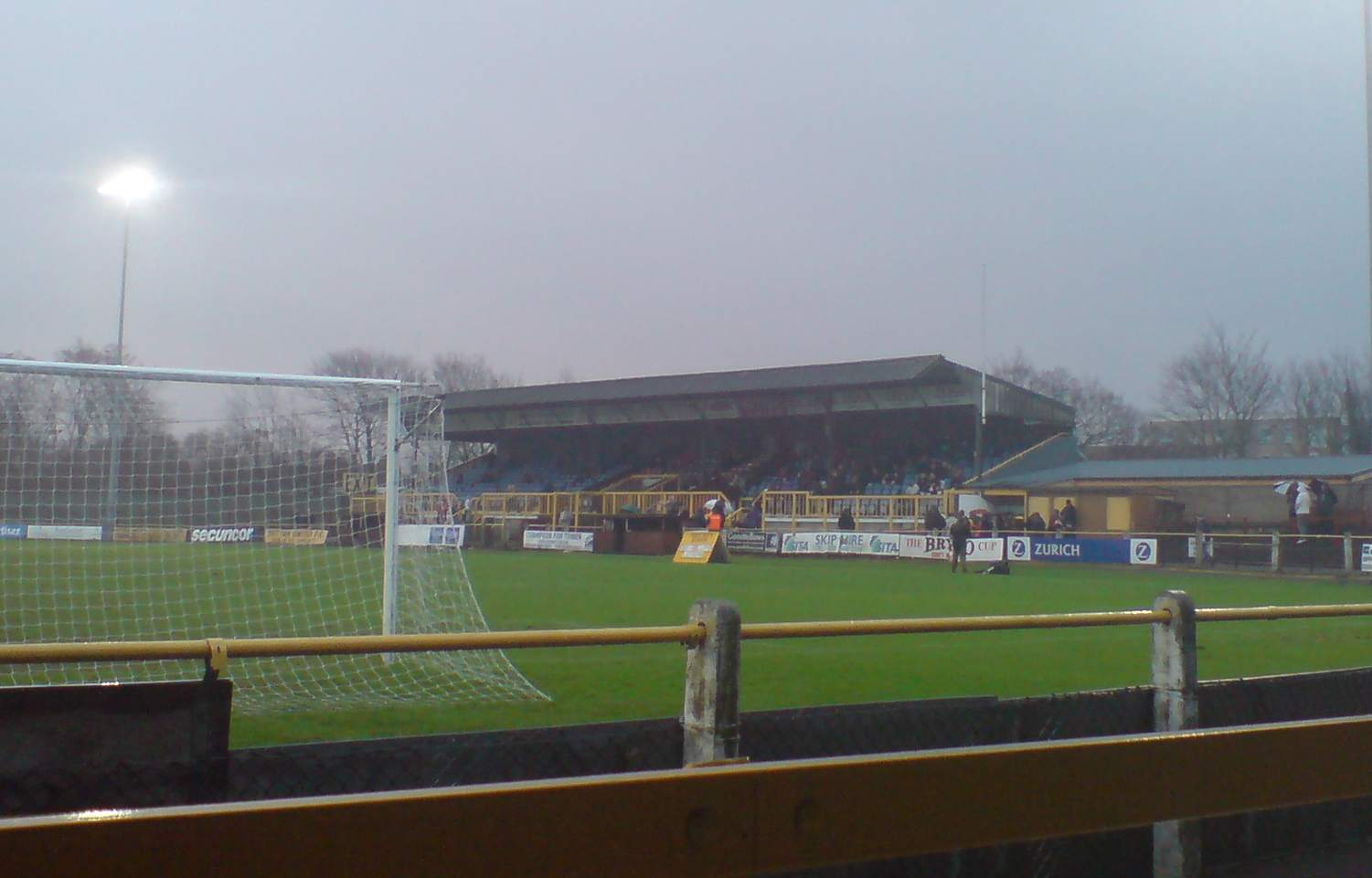
Gander Green Lane has been the home stadium for Sutton United for each season.

Sutton United Football Club, an association football club based in Sutton in the London Borough of Sutton, England, was founded in 1898 as a merger between Sutton Guild Rovers and Sutton Association Football Clubs. They were elected to play in the Athenian League for the 1921–22 season. They won the Athenian League title on three occasions and were runners-up once. After thirty-seven seasons in the Athenian League, they joined the Isthmian League (given the subtitle First Division in 1973 and then Premier Division in 1977). The club spent twenty-three seasons in the league, during that spell they won the title twice, reached the fourth round of the 1969–70 FA Cup, and reached the 1981 FA Trophy Final losing 1–0 to Bishop's Stortford. In 1986 they won the first promotion in their history as champions of the Isthmian League, moving up to the Football Conference.

United's third season in the Conference saw them reach the fourth round of the FA Cup for the second time in their history during the 1988–89 edition; their third round tie was a 2–1 victory over First Division side Coventry City, one of the biggest shocks in the competition. In 1991 United's spell in the conference was ended with relegation back to the Isthmian League Premier Division. The club finished the 1998–99 Isthmian League season as champions returning to the Conference after an eight-year absence. United's second spell in the Conference lasted a single season finishing the 1999–2000 Football Conference in last place. Up to 2004 the Conference was one division, but restructuring of the National League System saw two new divisions added, Conference North and Conference South, with many Isthmian League members transferred to these new divisions; for the 2004–05 season Sutton United were transferred to the South division.

After four seasons United experienced the third relegation of their history, rejoining the Isthmian Premier League. Their first season back saw them qualify for their first play-offs losing 3–0 in the semi-final to Staines Town. United reached the play-offs in the following season losing in the semi-finals again, this time 4–2 to Kingstonian. United's ended their third season as champions of the Isthmian Premier League and were promoted to the Conference South. Their five-season spell in the Conference South included two more failed play-off attempts. For the 2015–16 season the division was renamed National League South (with Conference Premier and Conference North also renamed) and United finished as champions with promotion to the National League. The 2016–17 season saw Sutton reach the fifth round of the FA Cup which is their furthest run in the competition and they became the ninth non-league team to reach this stage; they were drawn at home to Premier League side Arsenal and were defeated 2–0. The club finished the 2020–21 National League season as champions and were promoted into the English Football League for the first time in their history and played in EFL League Two for three seasons before being relegated back into the National League. As members of the English Football League Sutton were eligible to enter the EFL Cup, their furthest run so far in the competition saw them reach the third round in the 2023–24 season.

== Key ==
Key to divisions

- Athenian League
- Isthmian League
- Isthmian First Division = Isthmian League First Division
- Isthmian Prem = Isthmian Premier Division
- Conference = Football Conference
- Conference South = Football Conference South
- National South = National League South
- National League
- EFL League Two

Key to positions and symbols

- 1st = Champions
- 2nd = Runners-up
- ↑ = Promoted
- ↓ = Relegated

Key to rounds

- EPR = Extra preliminary round
- PRE = Preliminary round
- QR1 = First qualifying round, etc.
- Group = Group stage
- R1 = First round, etc.
- QF = Quarter-finals
- SF = Semi-finals
- RU = Runners-up

== Seasons ==
Season	League record									FA Cup	EFL Cup	EFL Trophy	FA Trophy	Other	
Season	Division	P	W	D	L	F	A	Pts	Pos	FA Cup	EFL Cup	EFL Trophy	FA Trophy	Competition	Result
1921–22	Athenian League	26	11	3	12	57	56	25	8th	QR1	—	—	—	—	—
1922–23	Athenian League	24	10	6	8	46	39	26	7th	PRE	—	—	—	—	—
1923–24	Athenian League	24	9	3	12	32	48	21	10th	EPR	—	—	—	—	—
1924–25	Athenian League	26	5	8	13	37	64	18	13th	—	—	—	—	—	—
1925–26	Athenian League	26	3	2	21	37	116	8	14th	QR2	—	—	—	—	—
1926–27	Athenian League	26	10	4	12	54	65	24	11th	QR2	—	—	—	—	—
1927–28	Athenian League	26	20	3	3	83	35	43	1st	QR2	—	—	—	—	—
1928–29	Athenian League	26	13	7	6	73	50	33	3rd	QR1	—	—	—	FA Amateur Cup	QF
1929–30	Athenian League	26	9	6	11	49	51	24	8th	QR1	—	—	—	—	—
1930–31	Athenian League	26	9	4	13	45	57	22	11th	QR1	—	—	—	—	—
1931–32	Athenian League	26	9	7	10	65	56	25	9th	QR2	—	—	—	—	—
1932–33	Athenian League	26	10	5	11	54	66	25	6th	QR1	—	—	—	—	—
1933–34	Athenian League	26	12	2	12	58	56	26	6th	PRE	—	—	—	FA Amateur Cup	R3
1934–35	Athenian League	26	10	3	13	69	63	23	9th	QR2	—	—	—	—	—
1935–36	Athenian League	26	9	5	12	40	61	23	10th	QR2	—	—	—	FA Amateur Cup	QF
1936–37	Athenian League	26	11	5	10	47	45	27	4th	PRE	—	—	—	FA Amateur Cup	SF
1937–38	Athenian League	26	10	6	10	56	63	26	6th	QR3	—	—	—	—	—
1938–39	Athenian League	26	9	4	13	45	57	22	10th	QR3	—	—	—	FA Amateur Cup	QF
No competitive football was played between 1939 and 1945 due to the Second World War
1945–46	Athenian League	26	17	6	3	100	44	40	1st	R1	—	—	—	—	—
1946–47	Athenian League	26	15	4	7	59	37	34	2nd	R1	—	—	—	—	—
1947–48	Athenian League	26	9	7	10	32	38	25	8th	QR1	—	—	—	—	—
1948–49	Athenian League	26	9	8	9	32	33	26	5th	QR2	—	—	—	FA Amateur Cup	R3
1949–50	Athenian League	26	9	2	15	37	48	20	12th	PRE	—	—	—	—	—
1950–51	Athenian League	30	15	5	10	63	51	35	5th	PRE	—	—	—	—	—
1951–52	Athenian League	30	15	8	7	70	53	38	4th	QR4	—	—	—	—	—
1952–53	Athenian League	26	7	4	15	44	60	18	13th	QR2	—	—	—	—	—
1953–54	Athenian League	26	8	7	11	35	42	23	8th	PRE	—	—	—	—	—
1954–55	Athenian League	26	11	8	7	57	45	30	4th	PRE	—	—	—	—	—
1955–56	Athenian League	28	9	4	15	56	64	22	12th	PRE	—	—	—	—	—
1956–57	Athenian League	28	10	5	13	40	51	25	11th	PRE	—	—	—	FA Amateur Cup	R3
1957–58	Athenian League	30	18	7	5	64	37	43	1st	QR1	—	—	—	—	—
1958–59	Athenian League	30	10	6	14	49	60	26	10th	QR3	—	—	—	—	—
1959–60	Athenian League	30	16	1	13	66	60	33	6th	QR4	—	—	—	—	—
1960–61	Athenian League	30	17	3	10	71	55	37	4th	R1	—	—	—	FA Amateur Cup	QF
1961–62	Athenian League	30	13	2	15	70	69	28	9th	QR1	—	—	—	—	—
1962–63	Athenian League ↑	30	16	4	10	75	47	36	4th	QR2	—	—	—	FA Amateur Cup	RU
1963–64	Isthmian League	38	23	5	10	99	64	51	4th	R1	—	—	—	FA Amateur Cup	R3
1964–65	Isthmian League	38	17	11	10	74	57	45	7th	QR2	—	—	—	—	—
1965–66	Isthmian League	38	17	7	14	83	72	41	9th	QR2	—	—	—	FA Amateur Cup	QF
1966–67	Isthmian League	38	26	7	5	89	33	59	1st	R1	—	—	—	—	—
1967–68	Isthmian League	38	22	11	5	89	27	55	2nd	QR4	—	—	—	FA Amateur Cup	SF
1968–69	Isthmian League	38	22	9	7	83	29	53	3rd	QR1	—	—	—	FA Amateur Cup	RU
1969–70	Isthmian League	38	24	9	5	75	35	57	3rd	R4	—	—	—	FA Amateur Cup	R2
1970–71	Isthmian League	38	29	3	6	76	35	61	2nd	QR4	—	—	—	—	—
1971–72	Isthmian League	40	21	10	9	77	43	52	6th	QR4	—	—	—	FA Amateur Cup	R3
1972–73	Isthmian League	42	21	9	12	69	48	51	7th	QR4	—	—	—	—	—
1973–74	Isthmian First Division	42	13	16	13	51	52	55	12th	QR2	—	—	—	FA Amateur Cup	QF
1974–75	Isthmian First Division	42	17	6	19	68	63	57	10th	QR4	—	—	R1	—	—
1975–76	Isthmian First Division	42	17	11	14	71	60	62	11th	R1	—	—	R1	—	—
1976–77	Isthmian First Division	42	14	7	21	40	55	49	16th	QR2	—	—	QR3	—	—
1977–78	Isthmian Prem	42	18	12	12	66	57	66	6th	QR4	—	—	R1	—	—
1978–79	Isthmian Prem	42	17	9	16	62	51	60	11th	QR4	—	—	R1	Anglo-Italian Cup	W
1979–80	Isthmian Prem	42	20	13	9	67	40	73	4th	QR2	—	—	QR3	Anglo-Italian Cup	RU
1980–81	Isthmian Prem	42	19	12	11	82	65	69	5th	QR4	—	—	RU	—	—
1981–82	Isthmian Prem	42	22	9	11	72	49	75	2nd	R2	—	—	R3	Anglo-Italian Cup	RU
1982–83	Isthmian Prem	42	20	8	14	96	71	68	5th	QR4	—	—	R2	—	—
1983–84	Isthmian Prem	42	18	12	12	67	45	66	4th	QR4	—	—	R1	—	—
1984–85	Isthmian Prem	42	23	15	4	115	55	84	1st	QR2	—	—	R1	—	—
1985–86	Isthmian Prem ↑	42	29	8	5	109	39	95	1st	QR2	—	—	R1	—	—
1986–87	Conference	42	19	11	12	81	51	68	7th	QR2	—	—	R2	—	—
1987–88	Conference	42	16	18	8	77	54	66	8th	R3	—	—	R1	—	—
1988–89	Conference	40	12	15	13	64	54	51	12th	R4	—	—	R2	—	—
1989–90	Conference	42	19	6	17	68	64	63	8th	R1	—	—	R1	—	—
1990–91	Conference ↓	42	10	9	23	62	82	39	21st	R1	—	—	R1	—	—
1991–92	Isthmian Prem	42	19	13	10	88	51	70	3rd	R1	—	—	R1	—	—
1992–93	Isthmian Prem	42	18	14	10	74	57	68	5th	R1	—	—	SF	—	—
1993–94	Isthmian Prem	42	23	10	9	77	31	79	5th	R3	—	—	QF	—	—
1994–95	Isthmian Prem	42	13	12	17	74	69	51	15th	QR4	—	—	R1	—	—
1995–96	Isthmian Prem	42	17	14	11	71	56	65	10th	R2	—	—	QR3	—	—
1996–97	Isthmian Prem	42	18	13	11	87	70	67	3rd	QR4	—	—	QR3	—	—
1997–98	Isthmian Prem	42	22	12	8	83	56	78	3rd	QR4	—	—	QR3	—	—
1998–99	Isthmian Prem ↑	42	27	7	8	89	39	88	1st	QR4	—	—	R3	—	—
1999–2000	Conference ↓	42	8	10	24	39	75	34	22nd	QR4	—	—	SF	—	—
2000–01	Isthmian Prem	41 (Note: The home fixture with Hendon was not played.)	14	11	16	74	70	53	13th	QR3	—	—	R1	—	—
2001–02	Isthmian Prem	42	13	15	14	62	63	54	12th	QR3	—	—	R1	—	—
2002–03	Isthmian Prem	46	22	9	15	77	62	75	6th	QR2	—	—	R3	—	—
2003–04	Isthmian Prem ↑	46	25	10	11	94	56	85	2nd	QR2	—	—	R3	—	—
2004–05	Conference South	42	14	11	17	60	71	53	15th	QR3	—	—	R3	Conference League Cup	R3
2005–06	Conference South	42	13	10	19	48	61	49	13th	QR3	—	—	QR3	—	—
2006–07	Conference South	42	14	9	19	58	63	51	14th	QR2	—	—	QR3	—	—
2007–08	Conference South ↓	42	5	9	28	32	86	24	22nd	QR3	—	—	R1	Conference League Cup	R1
2008–09	Isthmian Prem	42	18	13	11	57	53	67	5th (Note: Lost in play-off semi-final to Staines Town 3–0.)	R1	—	—	QR3	—	—
2009–10	Isthmian Prem	42	22	9	11	65	45	75	2nd (Note: Lost in play-off semi-final to Kingstonian 4–2.)	R1	—	—	QR1	—	—
2010–11	Isthmian Prem ↑	42	26	9	7	76	33	87	1st	QR1	—	—	R1	—	—
2011–12	Conference South	42	20	14	8	68	53	74	4th (Note: Lost in play-off semi-final to Welling United 2–1 on aggregate.)	R2	—	—	QR3	—	—
2012–13	Conference South	42	20	10	12	66	49	70	6th	QR2	—	—	R3	—	—
2013–14	Conference South	42	23	12	7	77	39	81	2nd (Note: Lost in play-off semi-final to Dover Athletic 4–1 on aggregate.)	R1	—	—	QR3	—	—
2014–15	Conference South	40	13	11	16	50	54	50	15th	QR3	—	—	R1	—	—
2015–16	National South (Note: The Football Conference was renamed the National League; the North and South divisions were also renamed National League North and National League South.) ↑	42	26	12	4	83	32	90	1st	QR4	—	—	R3	—	—
2016–17	National League	46	15	13	18	61	63	58	12th	R5	—	—	R3	—	—
2017–18	National League	46	23	10	13	67	53	79	3rd (Note: Lost in play-off semi-final to Boreham Wood 3–2.)	R1	—	—	R3	—	—
2018–19	National League	46	17	14	15	55	60	65	9th	R1	—	—	R2	Scottish Challenge Cup	R3
2019–20	National League	38	12	14	12	47	42	50	15th (Note: The 2019–20 National League was curtailed due to the COVID-19 pandemic, with league positions, promotions and relegations decided on a points-per-game basis.)	QR4	—	—	R1	—	—
2020–21	National League ↑	42	25	9	8	72	36	84	1st	QR4	—	—	R5	—	—
2021–22	EFL League Two	46	22	10	14	69	53	76	8th	R2	R1	RU	—	—	—
2022–23	EFL League Two	46	15	13	18	46	58	58	14th	R1	R1	R2	—	—	—
2023–24	EFL League Two ↓	46	9	15	22	59	84	42	23rd	R3	R3	Group	—	—	—
2024–25	National League	46	15	15	16	59	64	60	12th	R1	—	—	QF	National League Cup	RU
2025–26	National League	46	11	14	21	59	79	47	19th	R2	—	—	R3	National League Cup	Group
