= List of Bromley F.C. seasons =

Bromley Football Club is a professional association football club based in Bromley, Greater London, England. They are currently members of EFL League One, the third level of the English football league system. Bromley play their home matches at Hayes Lane.

== Early history ==
Formed in 1892, they were founder members of the Southern League in 1894, before becoming founder members of the London League in 1896. After winning the Division Two title, they spent one season in the Kent League. In 1907, they became founder members of the Spartan League and won the division title before joining the Isthmian League. They won the Isthmian League in 1908–09 and 1909–10 as well as the FA Amateur Cup in 1910–11. Bromley joined the Athenian League in 1919, which they won in 1922–23, 1948–49 and 1950–51. In this period, they also won the FA Amateur Cup in 1937–38 and 1948–49. They joined the Isthmian League again in 1952–53.

== Key ==
Key to league record

- Level = Level of the league in the current league system
- Pld = Games played
- W = Games won
- D = Games drawn
- L = Games lost
- GF = Goals for
- GA = Goals against
- GD = Goals difference
- Pts = Points
- Position = Position in the final league table
- Top scorer and number of goals scored shown in bold when he was also top scorer for the division.

Key to cup records

- Res = Final reached round
- Rec = Final club record in the form of wins-draws-losses
- PR = Preliminary round
- QR1 (2, etc.) = Qualifying Cup rounds
- G = Group stage
- R1 (2, etc.) = Proper Cup rounds
- QF = Quarter-finalists
- SF = Semi-finalists
- F = Finalists
- A(QF, SF, F) = Area quarter-, semi-, finalists
- W = Winners

== Seasons ==
Year	League														Cup competitions				Manager
Year	Division	Lvl	Pld	W	D	L	GF	GA	GD	Pts	Position	Leading league scorer		Average attendance	FA Cup		FA Trophy		Manager
Year	Division	Lvl	Pld	W	D	L	GF	GA	GD	Pts	Position	Name	Goals	Average attendance	Res	Rec	Res	Rec	Manager
Joined the Isthmian League from the Athenian League
1952–53	**Isthmian League**		28	17	4	7	71	35	+36	38	**2nd of 15**				QR1	1-0-1	—		
1953–54	**Isthmian League**		28	18	3	7	76	45	+31	39	**1st of 15**				PR	0-0-1	—		
1954–55	**Isthmian League**		28	18	2	8	66	34	+32	38	**3rd of 15**				QR1	1-0-1	—		
1955–56	**Isthmian League**		28	12	7	9	54	43	+11	31	**2nd of 15**				PR	0-0-1	—		
1956–57	**Isthmian League**		30	16	5	9	78	60	+18	37	**3rd of 16**				QR3	3-0-1	—		
1957–58	**Isthmian League**		30	13	9	8	66	51	+15	35	**4th of 16**				QR2	2-0-1	—		
1958–59	**Isthmian League**		30	11	7	12	56	55	+1	29	**9th of 16**				QR1	0-1-1	—		
1959–60	**Isthmian League**		30	15	6	9	74	46	+28	36	**6th of 16**				QR1	1-0-1	—		
1960–61	**Isthmian League**		30	20	6	4	89	42	+47	46	**1st of 16**				QR1	0-0-1	—		
1961–62	**Isthmian League**		30	10	4	16	49	69	-20	24	**14th of 16**				QR2	1-0-1	—		
1962–63	**Isthmian League**		30	12	10	8	57	51	+6	34	**7th of 16**				QR2	1-0-1	—		
1963–64	**Isthmian League**		38	11	8	19	64	75	-11	30	**15th of 20**				QR2	1-2-1	—		
1964–65	**Isthmian League**		38	14	11	13	71	80	-9	39	**9th of 20**				QR1	0-0-1	—		
1965–66	**Isthmian League**		38	10	5	23	69	101	-32	25	**16th of 20**				QR2	1-0-1	—		
1966–67	**Isthmian League**		38	12	7	19	50	67	-17	31	**14th of 20**				QR1	0-0-1	—		
1967–68	**Isthmian League**		38	12	10	16	58	80	-22	34	**13th of 20**				QR1	0-0-1	—		
1968–69	**Isthmian League**		38	8	7	23	52	95	-43	23	**17th of 20**				QR1	0-0-1	—		
1969–70	**Isthmian League**		38	3	4	31	28	111	-83	10	**20th of 20**				QR2	1-0-1	—		
1970–71	**Isthmian League**		38	10	6	22	34	77	-43	26	**16th of 20**				QR2	2-1-1	—		
1971–72	**Isthmian League**		40	16	10	14	67	64	+3	42	**11th of 21**				QR4	3-1-1	—		
1972–73	**Isthmian League**		42	4	10	28	31	70	-39	18	**20th of 22**				PR	0-0-1	—		
Isthmian League added a second division
1973–74	**Isthmian League**; **Division One**		42	7	9	26	37	81	-44	30	**19th of 22**				QR1	0-0-1	—		
1974–75	**Isthmian League**; **Division One**		42	6	3	33	25	110	-85	21	**22nd of 22**; Relegated				PR	0-1-1	QR1	0-0-1	
1975–76	**Isthmian League**; **Division Two**		42	11	11	20	64	86	-22	44	**16th of 22**				QR2	1-0-1	PR	0-0-1	
1976–77	**Isthmian League**; **Division Two**		42	20	10	12	71	46	+25	70	**7th of 22**				R1	4-0-1	QR2	2-2-1	
Isthmian League divisions renamed
1977–78	**Isthmian League**; **Division One**		42	23	13	6	74	41	+33	82	**3rd of 22**				QR2	1-1-1	QR2	2-1-1	
1978–79	**Isthmian League**; **Division One**		42	18	12	12	76	50	+26	66	**8th of 22**				PR	0-0-1	PR	0-0-1	
1979–80	**Isthmian League**; **Division One**		42	24	10	8	93	44	+49	82	**2nd of 22**; Promoted				QR1	1-0-1	QR2	1-0-1	
1980–81	**Isthmian League**; **Premier Division**	6	42	16	9	17	63	69	-6	57	**10th of 22**				QR3	2-0-1	QR1	0-0-1	
1981–82	**Isthmian League**; **Premier Division**	6	42	13	7	22	63	79	-16	46	**19th of 22**				QR1	0-0-1	QR2	1-0-1	
1982–83	**Isthmian League**; **Premier Division**	6	42	14	12	16	51	50	+1	54	**15th of 22**				QR1	1-0-1	R1	3-0-1	
1983–84	**Isthmian League**; **Premier Division**	6	42	7	11	24	33	72	-49	32	**22nd of 22**; Relegated				QR2	1-0-1	QR3	2-1-1	
1984–85	**Isthmian League**; **Division One**	7	42	18	9	15	71	64	+7	63	**8th of 22**				QR1	1-1-1	QR3	2-2-1	
1985–86	**Isthmian League**; **Division One**	7	42	24	8	10	68	41	+27	80	**2nd of 22**; Promoted				QR4	4-2-1	QR3	2-1-1	
1986–87	**Isthmian League**; **Premier Division**	6	42	16	11	15	63	72	-9	59	**11th of 22**				QR1	0-1-1	QR2	1-3-1	
1987–88	**Isthmian League**; **Premier Division**	6	42	23	7	12	68	40	+28	76	**2nd of 22**				QR3	2-1-1	QR2	1-0-1	
1988–89	**Isthmian League**; **Premier Division**	6	42	13	15	14	61	48	+13	54	**14th of 22**				QR3	2-2-1	R1	0-0-1	
1989–90	**Isthmian League**; **Premier Division**	6	42	7	11	24	32	69	-37	32	**21st of 22**; Relegated				QR4	3-2-1	QR3	0-0-1	
1990–91	**Isthmian League**; **Division One**	7	42	22	14	6	62	37	+25	80	**2nd of 22**; Promoted				QR2	1-0-1	QR2	1-1-1	
1991–92	**Isthmian League**; **Premier Division**	6	46	14	12	16	51	57	-6	54	**12th of 22**				QR3	2-0-1	R2	4-0-1	
1992–93	**Isthmian League**; **Premier Division**	6	42	11	13	18	51	72	-21	46	**17th of 22**				QR2	1-0-1	QR3	0-0-1	
1993–94	**Isthmian League**; **Premier Division**	6	42	14	7	21	56	69	-13	49	**15th of 22**				QR2	1-0-1	QR1	0-0-1	
1994–95	**Isthmian League**; **Premier Division**	6	42	18	11	13	76	67	+9	65	**6th of 22**				QR2	1-2-1	QR1	0-0-1	
1995–96	**Isthmian League**; **Premier Division**	6	42	10	7	25	52	91	-39	37	**19th of 22**				QR3	2-3-1	QR3	0-1-1	
1996–97	**Isthmian League**; **Premier Division**	6	42	13	9	20	67	72	-5	48	**18th of 22**				R1	4-1-1	QR3	2-1-1	
1997–98	**Isthmian League**; **Premier Division**	6	42	13	13	16	53	53	0	52	**15th of 22**				QR1	0-0-1	QR3	1-0-1	
1998–99	**Isthmian League**; **Premier Division**	6	42	8	11	23	50	72	-22	35	**22nd of 22**; Relegated				QR3	1-0-1	R2	0-0-1	
1999–2000	**Isthmian League**; **Division One**	7	42	17	9	16	62	65	-3	60	**9th of 22**				QR3	3-2-1	R3	1-0-1	
2000–01	**Isthmian League**; **Division One**	7	42	14	6	22	63	86	-23	48	**18th of 22**				QR1	1-0-1	R1	0-0-1	
2001–02	**Isthmian League**; **Division One**	7	42	10	11	21	44	74	-30	41	**19th of 22**			224	QR2	2-0-1	R2	1-1-1	
Isthmian League Division One divided into two sections
2002–03	**Isthmian League**; **Division One South**	7	46	21	13	12	70	53	+17	76	**6th of 24**			294	QR2	2-1-1	R1	0-0-1	
2003–04	**Isthmian League**; **Division One South**	7	46	22	10	14	80	58	+22	76	**8th of 24**			223	QR3	3-2-1	R1	0-0-1	
Conference North and Conference South, a new sixth tier leagues created, while the Isthmian League divisions One merged
2004–05	**Isthmian League**; **Division One**	8	42	22	9	11	69	44	+25	75	**4th of 22**; Promoted			335	QR4	4-2-1	R2	2-0-1	George Wakeling; Mark Goldberg
2004–05	**Isthmian League**; **Division One**	8	Promoted after winning the play-off												QR4	4-2-1	R2	2-0-1	George Wakeling; Mark Goldberg
2005–06	**Isthmian League**; **Premier Division**	7	42	16	14	12	57	49	+8	62	**11th of 22**			417	QR4	3-1-1	QR2	1-0-1	Mark Goldberg
2006–07	**Isthmian League**; **Premier Division**	7	42	23	11	8	83	43	+40	80	**2nd of 22**; Promoted			718	R1	4-0-1	QR2	1-1-1	Mark Goldberg
2006–07	**Isthmian League**; **Premier Division**	7	Promoted after winning the play-off												R1	4-0-1	QR2	1-1-1	Mark Goldberg
2007–08	**Conference South**	6	42	19	7	16	77	66	+11	64	**11th of 22**			643	QR4	2-1-1	R1	1-0-1	Mark Goldberg; Simon Osborn
2008–09	**Conference South**	6	42	15	9	18	60	64	-4	54	**13th of 22**			519	QR2	0-0-1	QR3	0-0-1	Mark Goldberg
2009–10	**Conference South**	6	42	15	10	17	68	64	+4	55	**12th of 22**			523	R1	3-0-1	QR2	0-0-1	Mark Goldberg
2010–11	**Conference South**	6	42	15	12	15	49	61	-12	57	**11th of 22**	Leon McKenzie; Warren McBean	8	548	QR3	1-2-1	QR3	0-0-1	Mark Goldberg
2011–12	**Conference South**	6	42	10	15	17	52	66	-14	45	**17th of 22**	Hakeem Araba	14	483	R1	3-0-1	QR3	0-0-1	Mark Goldberg
2012–13	**Conference South**	6	42	14	6	22	54	69	-15	48	**15th of 22**	Pierre Joseph-Dubois	16	509	R1	3-0-1	R3	3-2-1	Mark Goldberg
2013–14	**Conference South**	6	42	25	5	12	82	50	+32	80	**3rd of 22**	Bradley Goldberg	23	629	QR3	1-0-1	QR3	0-0-1	Mark Goldberg
2013–14	**Conference South**	6	Lost in the **play-off** semifinal												QR3	1-0-1	QR3	0-0-1	Mark Goldberg
2014–15	**Conference South**	6	40	23	8	9	79	46	+33	77	**1st of 21**; Promoted	Moses Emmanuel	15	1,077	R1	3-1-1	R2	2-1-1	Mark Goldberg
Fifth and sixth tier divisions renamed
2015–16	**National League**	5	46	17	9	20	67	72	-5	60	**14th of 24**	Moses Emmanuel	19	1,398	QR4	0-0-1	R1	0-0-1	Mark Goldberg; Neil Smith
2016–17	**National League**	5	46	18	8	20	59	66	-7	62	**10th of 24**	Blair Turgott	12	1,113	QR4	0-0-1	R2	1-0-1	Neil Smith
2017–18	**National League**	5	46	19	13	14	75	57	+18	70	**9th of 24**	Josh Rees	16	1,445	R1	1-1-1	F	5-4-0	Neil Smith
2018–19	**National League**	5	46	16	12	18	68	69	-1	60	**12th of 24**	JJ Hooper	14	1,479	R1	1-0-1	R1	1-0-0	Neil Smith
2019–20	**National League**	5	38	14	10	14	57	52	+5	52	**13th of 24**	Michael Cheek	13	2,018	R1	1-1-1	R1	0-0-1	Neil Smith
2019–20	**National League**	5	The regular season was cut short due to COVID-19, final league positions decided by points-per-game												R1	1-1-1	R1	0-0-1	Neil Smith
2020–21	**National League**	5	42	19	12	11	63	53	+10	69	**7th of 22**	Michael Cheek	23	– (Note: COVID-19 prevented fans from attending games)	R1	1-0-1	R4	1-1-0	Neil Smith; Andy Woodman
2020–21	**National League**	5	Lost in the **play-off** quarterfinal												R1	1-0-1	R4	1-1-0	Neil Smith; Andy Woodman
2021–22	**National League**	5	44	18	13	13	61	53	+8	67	**10th of 23**	Michael Cheek	17	1,962	R1	1–0–1	**W**	5–1–0	Andy Woodman
2022–23	**National League**	5	46	18	17	11	68	53	+15	71	**7th of 24**	Michael Cheek	17	2,585	QR4	0–0–1	R3	0–0–1	Andy Woodman
2022–23	**National League**	5	Lost in the **play-off** semifinal												QR4	0–0–1	R3	0–0–1	Andy Woodman
2023–24	**National League**	5	46	22	15	9	73	49	+24	81	**3rd of 24**; Promoted	Michael Cheek	23	2,637	R1	1–0–1	SF	3–1–1	Andy Woodman
2023–24	**National League**	5	Promoted after winning the **play-off**												R1	1–0–1	SF	3–1–1	Andy Woodman
2024–25	**EFL League Two**	4	46	17	15	14	64	59	+5	66	**11th of 24**	Michael Cheek	25	3,092	R3	2–0–1	—		Andy Woodman
2025–26	**EFL League Two**	4	46	24	15	7	71	46	+25	87	**1st of 24**; Promoted	Michael Cheek	16	3,965	R1	0–0–1	—		Andy Woodman
2026–27	**EFL League One**	3	—	—	—	—	—	—	—	—	—	—	—	—	—	—			Andy Woodman

== Notes ==
- Source: Bromley at the Football Club History Database
