= 1962–63 Athenian League =

Athenian League
- Season: 1962–63
- Champions: Enfield
- Promoted: Enfield; Sutton United; Hitchin Town; Hendon
- Matches played: 240
- Goals scored: 978 (4.08 per match)

The 1962–63 Athenian League season was the 40th in the history of Athenian League. The league consisted of 16 teams. 4 teams were promoted to Isthmian League and 12 teams joined the new Premier Division.

== League table ==
Pos	Team	Pld	W	D	L	GF	GA	GR	Pts	Promotion
1	Enfield (C, P)	30	26	2	2	130	28	4.643	54	Promotion to Isthmian League
2	Barnet	30	22	3	5	90	39	2.308	47	Joined Premier Division
3	Wealdstone	30	19	4	7	62	39	1.590	42	Joined Premier Division
4	Sutton United (P)	30	16	4	10	75	47	1.596	36	Promotion to Isthmian League
5	Hitchin Town (P)	30	16	3	11	74	61	1.213	35	Promotion to Isthmian League
6	Walton & Hershan	30	15	4	11	66	49	1.347	34	Joined Premier Division
7	Hendon (P)	30	12	5	13	60	60	1.000	29	Promotion to Isthmian League
8	Finchley	30	13	2	15	55	46	1.196	28	Joined Premier Division
9	Hayes	30	13	2	15	52	62	0.839	28	Joined Premier Division
10	Hounslow Town	30	10	7	13	49	63	0.778	27	Joined Premier Division
11	Hornchurch	30	12	3	15	59	77	0.766	27	Joined Premier Division
12	Southall	30	9	6	15	48	53	0.906	24	Joined Premier Division
13	Grays Athletic	30	9	3	18	54	88	0.614	21	Joined Premier Division
14	Carshalton Athletic	30	7	3	20	34	95	0.358	17	Joined Premier Division
15	Leyton	30	7	2	21	34	82	0.415	16	Joined Premier Division
16	Redhill	30	6	3	21	36	89	0.404	15	Joined Premier Division

Source: RSSSF
(C) Champions; (P) Promoted

=== Stadia and locations ===
Locations of the Athenian League clubs
Greater London Athenian League football clubs

Club	Stadium
Barnet	Underhill Stadium
Carshalton Athletic	War Memorial Sports Ground
Enfield	Southbury Road
Finchley	Summers Lane
Grays Athletic	New Recreation Ground
Hayes	Church Road
Hendon	Claremont Road
Hitchin Town	Top Field
Hornchurch	Hornchurch Stadium
Hounslow	Denbigh Road
Leyton	Leyton Stadium
Redhill	Kiln Brow
Southall	Robert Parker Stadium
Sutton United	Gander Green Lane
Walton & Hersham	The Sports Ground
Wealdstone	Grosvenor Vale
