= 1967–68 Isthmian League =

The 1967–68 season was the 53rd in the history of the Isthmian League, an English football competition.

Enfield were champions, winning their first Isthmian League title.

== League table ==
Isthmian League
- Season: 1967–68
- Champions: Enfield
- Matches: 380
- Goals: 1,267 (3.33 per match)

Pos	Team	Pld	W	D	L	GF	GA	GR	Pts
1	Enfield	38	28	8	2	85	22	3.864	64
2	Sutton United	38	22	11	5	89	27	3.296	55
3	Hendon	38	23	6	9	90	36	2.500	52
4	Leytonstone	38	21	10	7	78	41	1.902	52
5	St Albans City	38	20	8	10	78	41	1.902	48
6	Walthamstow Avenue	38	19	9	10	81	64	1.266	47
7	Wealdstone	38	19	8	11	80	45	1.778	46
8	Tooting & Mitcham United	38	19	5	14	57	45	1.267	43
9	Barking	38	17	8	13	75	57	1.316	42
10	Oxford City	38	17	4	17	59	58	1.017	38
11	Kingstonian	38	14	10	14	56	61	0.918	38
12	Hitchin Town	38	14	9	15	61	73	0.836	37
13	Bromley	38	12	10	16	58	80	0.725	34
14	Wycombe Wanderers	38	13	5	20	73	85	0.859	31
15	Dulwich Hamlet	38	10	7	21	39	66	0.591	27
16	Clapton	38	10	7	21	51	88	0.580	27
17	Woking	38	8	8	22	50	90	0.556	24
18	Corinthian-Casuals	38	7	10	21	40	80	0.500	24
19	Ilford	38	7	7	24	41	77	0.532	21
20	Maidstone United	38	3	4	31	26	131	0.198	10

Source: fchd.com rsssf.com
Rules for classification: 1) points; 2) goal ratio.

=== Stadia and locations ===
Locations of the Isthmian League clubs
Greater London Isthmian League football clubs

Club	Stadium
Barking	Mayesbrook Park
Bromley	Hayes Lane
Clapton	The Old Spotted Dog Ground
Corinthian-Casuals	King George's Field
Dulwich Hamlet	Champion Hill
Enfield	Southbury Road
Hendon	Claremont Road
Hitchin Town	Top Field
Ilford	Victoria Road
Kingstonian	Kingsmeadow
Leytonstone	Granleigh Road
Maidstone United	Gallagher Stadium
Oxford City	Marsh Lane
St Albans City	Clarence Park
Sutton United	Gander Green Lane
Tooting & Mitcham United	Imperial Fields
Walthamstow Avenue	Green Pond Road
Wealdstone	Grosvenor Vale
Woking	The Laithwaite Community Stadium
Wycombe Wanderers	Adams Park
