= 1969–70 Isthmian League =

The 1969–70 season was the 55th in the history of the Isthmian League, an English football competition.

Enfield were champions, winning the league for the third season in a row.

== League table ==
Isthmian League
- Season: 1969–70
- Champions: Enfield
- Matches: 380
- Goals: 1,212 (3.19 per match)

Pos	Team	Pld	W	D	L	GF	GA	GR	Pts
1	Enfield	38	27	8	3	91	26	3.500	62
2	Wycombe Wanderers	38	25	11	2	85	24	3.542	61
3	Sutton United	38	24	9	5	75	35	2.143	57
4	Barking	38	21	9	8	93	47	1.979	51
5	Hendon	38	19	12	7	77	44	1.750	50
6	St Albans City	38	21	8	9	69	40	1.725	50
7	Hitchin Town	38	19	10	9	71	40	1.775	48
8	Tooting & Mitcham United	38	19	5	14	88	62	1.419	43
9	Leytonstone	38	17	7	14	57	41	1.390	41
10	Wealdstone	38	15	10	13	53	48	1.104	40
11	Oxford City	38	15	7	16	61	78	0.782	37
12	Kingstonian	38	13	9	16	55	57	0.965	35
13	Ilford	38	8	15	15	42	73	0.575	31
14	Dulwich Hamlet	38	8	12	18	46	66	0.697	28
15	Woking	38	10	7	21	46	69	0.667	27
16	Walthamstow Avenue	38	11	5	22	52	81	0.642	27
17	Clapton	38	9	7	22	45	87	0.517	25
18	Maidstone United	38	7	8	23	48	84	0.571	22
19	Corinthian-Casuals	38	6	3	29	30	99	0.303	15
20	Bromley	38	3	4	31	28	111	0.252	10

Source: fchd.com rsssf.com
Rules for classification: 1) points; 2) goal ratio.

=== Stadia and locations ===
Locations of the Isthmian League clubs
Greater London Isthmian League football clubs

Club	Stadium
Barking	Mayesbrook Park
Bromley	Hayes Lane
Clapton	The Old Spotted Dog Ground
Corinthian-Casuals	King George's Field
Dulwich Hamlet	Champion Hill
Enfield	Southbury Road
Hendon	Claremont Road
Hitchin Town	Top Field
Ilford	Victoria Road
Kingstonian	Kingsmeadow
Leytonstone	Granleigh Road
Maidstone United	Gallagher Stadium
Oxford City	Marsh Lane
St Albans City	Clarence Park
Sutton United	Gander Green Lane
Tooting & Mitcham United	Imperial Fields
Walthamstow Avenue	Green Pond Road
Wealdstone	Grosvenor Vale
Woking	The Laithwaite Community Stadium
Wycombe Wanderers	Adams Park
