= 1962–63 Isthmian League =

The 1962–63 season was the 48th in the history of the Isthmian League, an English football competition. Wimbledon were champions for the second season in a row, winning their seventh Isthmian League title.

== League table ==
Isthmian League
- Season: 1962–63
- Champions: Wimbledon
- Matches: 240
- Goals: 844 (3.52 per match)

Pos	Team	Pld	W	D	L	GF	GA	GR	Pts
1	Wimbledon	30	19	8	3	84	33	2.545	46
2	Kingstonian	30	18	8	4	79	37	2.135	44
3	Tooting & Mitcham United	30	17	8	5	65	37	1.757	42
4	Ilford	30	19	3	8	70	44	1.591	41
5	Walthamstow Avenue	30	14	7	9	51	44	1.159	35
6	Maidstone United	30	13	8	9	56	45	1.244	34
7	Bromley	30	12	10	8	57	51	1.118	34
8	Leytonstone	30	12	7	11	48	50	0.960	31
9	Wycombe Wanderers	30	10	10	10	56	61	0.918	30
10	St Albans City	30	11	5	14	54	49	1.102	27
11	Barking	30	8	10	12	39	50	0.780	26
12	Oxford City	30	8	9	13	55	64	0.859	25
13	Woking	30	8	6	16	42	66	0.636	22
14	Clapton	30	7	4	19	30	71	0.423	18
15	Dulwich Hamlet	30	4	5	21	30	71	0.423	13
16	Corinthian-Casuals	30	4	4	22	28	71	0.394	12

Source: fchd.com rsssf.com
Rules for classification: 1) points; 2) goal ratio.

=== Stadia and locations ===
Locations of the Isthmian League clubs
Greater London Isthmian League football clubs

Club	Stadium
Barking	Mayesbrook Park
Bromley	Hayes Lane
Clapton	The Old Spotted Dog Ground
Corinthian-Casuals	King George's Field
Dulwich Hamlet	Champion Hill
Ilford	Victoria Road
Kingstonian	Kingsmeadow
Leytonstone	Granleigh Road
Maidstone United	Gallagher Stadium
Oxford City	Marsh Lane
St Albans City	Clarence Park
Tooting & Mitcham United	Imperial Fields
Walthamstow Avenue	Green Pond Road
Wimbledon	Plough Lane
Woking	The Laithwaite Community Stadium
Wycombe Wanderers	Adams Park
