= 1966–67 Isthmian League =

The 1966–67 season was the 52nd in the history of the Isthmian League, an English football competition.

Sutton United were champions, winning their first Isthmian League title.

== League table ==
Isthmian League
- Season: 1966–67
- Champions: Sutton United
- Matches: 380
- Goals: 1,252 (3.29 per match)

Pos	Team	Pld	W	D	L	GF	GA	GR	Pts
1	Sutton United	38	26	7	5	89	33	2.697	59
2	Walthamstow Avenue	38	22	12	4	89	47	1.894	56
3	Wycombe Wanderers	38	23	8	7	92	54	1.704	54
4	Enfield	38	25	2	11	87	33	2.636	52
5	Hendon	38	20	9	9	64	37	1.730	49
6	Tooting & Mitcham United	38	19	10	9	76	60	1.267	48
7	Leytonstone	38	19	9	10	67	38	1.763	47
8	St Albans City	38	16	12	10	59	45	1.311	44
9	Kingstonian	38	18	8	12	60	49	1.224	44
10	Oxford City	38	15	9	14	74	61	1.213	39
11	Woking	38	13	10	15	65	71	0.915	36
12	Wealdstone	38	13	8	17	72	73	0.986	34
13	Barking	38	11	12	15	56	61	0.918	34
14	Bromley	38	12	7	19	50	67	0.746	31
15	Clapton	38	10	8	20	49	92	0.533	28
16	Ilford	38	8	10	20	43	77	0.558	26
17	Corinthian-Casuals	38	9	7	22	45	68	0.662	25
18	Maidstone United	38	6	10	22	43	90	0.478	22
19	Hitchin Town	38	8	6	24	39	89	0.438	22
20	Dulwich Hamlet	38	3	4	31	33	107	0.308	10

Source: fchd.com rsssf.com
Rules for classification: 1) points; 2) goal ratio.

=== Stadia and locations ===
Locations of the Isthmian League clubs
Greater London Isthmian League football clubs

Club	Stadium
Barking	Mayesbrook Park
Bromley	Hayes Lane
Clapton	The Old Spotted Dog Ground
Corinthian-Casuals	King George's Field
Dulwich Hamlet	Champion Hill
Enfield	Southbury Road
Hendon	Claremont Road
Hitchin Town	Top Field
Ilford	Victoria Road
Kingstonian	Kingsmeadow
Leytonstone	Granleigh Road
Maidstone United	Gallagher Stadium
Oxford City	Marsh Lane
St Albans City	Clarence Park
Sutton United	Gander Green Lane
Tooting & Mitcham United	Imperial Fields
Walthamstow Avenue	Green Pond Road
Wealdstone	Grosvenor Vale
Woking	The Laithwaite Community Stadium
Wycombe Wanderers	Adams Park
