= 1972–73 Isthmian League =

The 1972–73 season was the 58th in the history of the Isthmian League, an English football competition.

The league expanded up to 22 clubs after the Athenian League club Leatherhead was newly admitted.

Hendon were champions, winning their second Isthmian League title. It was the last Isthmian League season, consisting of a single division, as before the next season sixteen clubs joined the league and formed a new Second Division. It was also the last season in which the Isthmian League used two points for a win.

== League table ==
Isthmian League
- Season: 1972–73
- Champions: Hendon
- Matches: 462
- Goals: 1,264 (2.74 per match)

Pos	Team	Pld	W	D	L	GF	GA	GR	Pts
1	Hendon	42	34	6	2	88	18	4.889	74
2	Walton & Hersham	42	25	11	6	60	25	2.400	61
3	Leatherhead	42	23	10	9	76	32	2.375	56
4	Wycombe Wanderers	42	25	6	11	66	32	2.063	56
5	Walthamstow Avenue	42	20	12	10	66	48	1.375	52
6	Tooting & Mitcham United	42	20	11	11	73	39	1.872	51
7	Sutton United	42	21	9	12	69	48	1.438	51
8	Kingstonian	42	20	10	12	60	49	1.224	50
9	Enfield	42	20	8	14	90	54	1.667	48
10	Bishop's Stortford	42	18	12	12	58	51	1.137	48
11	Hayes	42	19	8	15	69	42	1.643	46
12	Dulwich Hamlet	42	18	9	15	59	52	1.135	45
13	Ilford	42	18	9	15	61	59	1.034	45
14	Leytonstone	42	17	11	14	55	54	1.019	45
15	Woking	42	18	8	16	61	56	1.089	44
16	Hitchin Town	42	15	9	18	52	64	0.813	39
17	Barking	42	8	7	27	45	88	0.511	23
18	St Albans City	42	5	12	25	34	76	0.447	22
19	Oxford City	42	6	7	29	30	101	0.297	19
20	Bromley	42	4	10	28	31	70	0.443	18
21	Clapton	42	3	11	28	31	100	0.310	17
22	Corinthian-Casuals	42	3	8	31	30	106	0.283	14

Source: fchd.com rsssf.com
Rules for classification: 1) points; 2) goal ratio.

=== Stadia and locations ===
Locations of the Isthmian League clubs
Greater London Isthmian League football clubs

Club	Stadium
Barking	Mayesbrook Park
Bishop's Stortford	Woodside Park
Bromley	Hayes Lane
Clapton	The Old Spotted Dog Ground
Corinthian-Casuals	King George's Field
Dulwich Hamlet	Champion Hill
Enfield	Southbury Road
Hayes	Church Road
Hendon	Claremont Road
Hitchin Town	Top Field
Ilford	Victoria Road
Kingstonian	Kingsmeadow
Leatherhead	Fetcham Grove
Leytonstone	Granleigh Road
Oxford City	Marsh Lane
St Albans City	Clarence Park
Sutton United	Gander Green Lane
Tooting & Mitcham United	Imperial Fields
Walthamstow Avenue	Green Pond Road
Walton & Hersham	The Sports Ground
Woking	The Laithwaite Community Stadium
Wycombe Wanderers	Adams Park
