= 1909–10 Isthmian League =

The 1909–10 season was the fifth in the history of the Isthmian League, an English football competition.

Bromley successfully defended its 1908–09 Isthmian League championship bringing in a second title after having joined the league the previous season.

== League table ==
Isthmian League
- Season: 1909–10
- Champions: Bromley
- Matches: 90
- Goals: 336 (3.73 per match)

Pos	Team	Pld	W	D	L	GF	GA	GR	Pts
1	Bromley	18	11	4	3	32	10	3.200	26
2	Clapton	18	10	4	4	56	19	2.947	24
3	Nunhead	18	10	4	4	49	26	1.885	24
4	Ilford	18	10	3	5	31	17	1.824	23
5	Dulwich Hamlet	18	8	4	6	26	26	1.000	20
6	Leytonstone	18	7	3	8	44	46	0.957	17
7	Oxford City	18	5	4	9	28	45	0.622	14
8	London Caledonians	18	5	3	10	19	40	0.475	13
9	West Norwood	18	5	2	11	28	52	0.538	12
10	Shepherd's Bush	18	2	3	13	23	55	0.418	7

Source: fchd.com rsssf.com
Rules for classification: 1) points; 2) goal ratio.
