= 1964–65 Isthmian League =

The 1964–65 season was the 50th in the history of the Isthmian League, an English football competition.

At the end of the previous season Wimbledon switched to the Southern Football League, while the Athenian League club Wealdstone were newly admitted.

Hendon were champions after beating Enfield in a championship play-off.

== League table ==
Isthmian League
- Season: 1964–65
- Champions: Hendon
- Matches: 380
- Goals: 1,403 (3.69 per match)

Pos	Team	Pld	W	D	L	GF	GA	GR	Pts
1	Hendon	38	28	7	3	123	49	2.510	63
2	Enfield	38	29	5	4	98	35	2.800	63
3	Kingstonian	38	24	8	6	86	44	1.955	56
4	Leytonstone	38	24	5	9	115	62	1.855	53
5	Oxford City	38	20	7	11	76	51	1.490	47
6	St Albans City	38	18	9	11	63	43	1.465	45
7	Sutton United	38	17	11	10	74	57	1.298	45
8	Wealdstone	38	19	6	13	93	68	1.368	44
9	Bromley	38	14	11	13	71	80	0.888	39
10	Tooting & Mitcham United	38	15	7	16	71	66	1.076	37
11	Hitchin Town	38	13	9	16	61	66	0.924	35
12	Walthamstow Avenue	38	15	5	18	63	82	0.768	35
13	Wycombe Wanderers	38	13	7	18	70	85	0.824	33
14	Corinthian-Casuals	38	13	7	18	56	77	0.727	33
15	Barking	38	10	8	20	58	80	0.725	28
16	Ilford	38	8	8	22	43	89	0.483	24
17	Maidstone United	38	8	6	24	49	86	0.570	22
18	Dulwich Hamlet	38	8	5	25	45	79	0.570	21
19	Clapton	38	8	3	27	43	91	0.473	19
20	Woking	38	7	4	27	45	113	0.398	18

Rules for classification: 1) points; 2) goal ratio.

=== Stadia and locations ===
Locations of the Isthmian League clubs
Greater London Isthmian League football clubs

Club	Stadium
Barking	Mayesbrook Park
Bromley	Hayes Lane
Clapton	The Old Spotted Dog Ground
Corinthian-Casuals	King George's Field
Dulwich Hamlet	Champion Hill
Enfield	Southbury Road
Hendon	Claremont Road
Hitchin Town	Top Field
Ilford	Victoria Road
Kingstonian	Kingsmeadow
Leytonstone	Granleigh Road
Maidstone United	Gallagher Stadium
Oxford City	Marsh Lane
St Albans City	Clarence Park
Sutton United	Gander Green Lane
Tooting & Mitcham United	Imperial Fields
Walthamstow Avenue	Green Pond Road
Wealdstone	Grosvenor Vale
Woking	The Laithwaite Community Stadium
Wycombe Wanderers	Adams Park
