= 1956–57 Isthmian League =

The 1956–57 season was the 42nd in the history of the Isthmian League, an English football competition.

Tooting & Mitcham United were newly admitted from the Athenian League.

Wycombe Wanderers were champions for the second season in a row.

== League table ==
Isthmian League
- Season: 1956–57
- Champions: Wycombe Wanderers
- Matches: 240
- Goals: 984 (4.1 per match)

Pos	Team	Pld	W	D	L	GF	GA	GR	Pts
1	Wycombe Wanderers	30	18	6	6	86	53	1.623	42
2	Woking	30	20	1	9	104	47	2.213	41
3	Bromley	30	16	5	9	78	60	1.300	37
4	Oxford City	30	16	3	11	65	57	1.140	35
5	Ilford	30	12	8	10	59	65	0.908	32
6	Tooting & Mitcham United	30	10	11	9	53	48	1.104	31
7	Kingstonian	30	11	9	10	72	77	0.935	31
8	Walthamstow Avenue	30	11	8	11	48	46	1.043	30
9	Dulwich Hamlet	30	13	3	14	65	54	1.204	29
10	St Albans City	30	13	3	14	62	71	0.873	29
11	Leytonstone	30	11	6	13	50	50	1.000	28
12	Clapton	30	9	9	12	48	59	0.814	27
13	Wimbledon	30	10	5	15	47	66	0.712	25
14	Romford	30	10	5	15	53	81	0.654	25
15	Barking	30	7	6	17	48	72	0.667	20
16	Corinthian-Casuals	30	7	4	19	46	78	0.590	18

Source: fchd.com rsssf.com
Rules for classification: 1) points; 2) goal ratio.
