= 1981 FA Trophy final =

1981 FA Trophy Final
- Event: 1980–81 FA Trophy
Bishop's Stortford	Sutton United
1	0
- Date: 16 May 1981
- Venue: Wembley Stadium, London
- Attendance: 22,578

The 1981 FA Trophy Final was the 12th final of the FA Trophy, the Football Association's cup competition for non-League teams. It was contested by Bishop's Stortford and Sutton United. Bishop's Stortford won the match 1–0 with Terry Sullivan scoring the goal in the 90th minute.

== Final ==
16 May 1981
15:00

Bishop's Stortford	1–0	Sutton United
Sullivan 90'

Wembley Stadium, London
Attendance: 22,578
