= 1955–56 Isthmian League =

The 1955–56 season was the 41st in the history of the Isthmian League, an English football competition.

Wycombe Wanderers were champions, winning their first Isthmian League title.

== League table ==
Isthmian League
- Season: 1955–56
- Champions: Wycombe Wanderers
- Matches: 210
- Goals: 794 (3.78 per match)

Pos	Team	Pld	W	D	L	GF	GA	GR	Pts
1	Wycombe Wanderers	28	19	5	4	82	36	2.278	43
2	Bromley	28	12	7	9	54	43	1.256	31
3	Leytonstone	28	12	7	9	50	44	1.136	31
4	Woking	28	14	3	11	62	60	1.033	31
5	Barking	28	12	7	9	41	45	0.911	31
6	Kingstonian	28	12	6	10	67	64	1.047	30
7	Walthamstow Avenue	28	13	3	12	61	45	1.356	29
8	Ilford	28	10	8	10	44	52	0.846	28
9	Oxford City	28	10	7	11	48	55	0.873	27
10	Clapton	28	9	8	11	45	48	0.938	26
11	Wimbledon	28	12	2	14	51	62	0.823	26
12	Corinthian-Casuals	28	9	7	12	56	56	1.000	25
13	Dulwich Hamlet	28	9	6	13	55	67	0.821	24
14	Romford	28	9	6	13	42	55	0.764	24
15	St Albans City	28	2	10	16	36	62	0.581	14

Source: fchd.com rsssf.com
Rules for classification: 1) points; 2) goal ratio.
