= 1963–64 Isthmian League =

The 1963–64 season was the 49th in the history of the Isthmian League, an English football competition.

The league was expanded up to twenty clubs after the Athenian League sides Enfield, Hendon, Hitchin Town and Sutton United were admitted.

Wimbledon were champions for the third season in a row, winning their eighth Isthmian League title. At the end of the season Wimbledon switched to the Southern Football League.

== League table ==
Isthmian League
- Season: 1963–64
- Champions: Wimbledon
- Matches: 380
- Goals: 1,441 (3.79 per match)

Pos	Team	Pld	W	D	L	GF	GA	GR	Pts	Transfers
1	Wimbledon	38	27	6	5	87	44	1.977	60	Switched to the SFL Division One
2	Hendon	38	25	4	9	124	38	3.263	54	
3	Kingstonian	38	24	4	10	100	62	1.613	52	
4	Sutton United	38	23	5	10	99	64	1.547	51	
5	Enfield	38	20	10	8	96	56	1.714	50	
6	Oxford City	38	20	8	10	90	55	1.636	48	
7	Tooting & Mitcham United	38	19	8	11	78	51	1.529	46	
8	St Albans City	38	14	12	12	62	63	0.984	40	
9	Ilford	38	16	8	14	75	79	0.949	40	
10	Maidstone United	38	15	8	15	65	71	0.915	38	
11	Walthamstow Avenue	38	15	6	17	70	66	1.061	36	
12	Leytonstone	38	14	8	16	66	71	0.930	36	
13	Wycombe Wanderers	38	13	6	19	74	80	0.925	32	
14	Hitchin Town	38	14	4	20	67	100	0.670	32	
15	Bromley	38	11	8	19	64	75	0.853	30	
16	Barking	38	10	9	19	46	69	0.667	29	
17	Woking	38	10	9	19	48	88	0.545	29	
18	Corinthian-Casuals	38	10	4	24	52	92	0.565	24	
19	Dulwich Hamlet	38	6	12	20	47	97	0.485	24	
20	Clapton	38	2	5	31	31	120	0.258	9	

Source: fchd.com rsssf.com
Rules for classification: 1) points; 2) goal ratio.

=== Stadia and locations ===
Locations of the Isthmian League clubs
Greater London Isthmian League football clubs

Club	Stadium
Barking	Mayesbrook Park
Bromley	Hayes Lane
Clapton	The Old Spotted Dog Ground
Corinthian-Casuals	King George's Field
Dulwich Hamlet	Champion Hill
Enfield	Southbury Road
Hendon	Claremont Road
Hitchin Town	Top Field
Ilford	Victoria Road
Kingstonian	Kingsmeadow
Leytonstone	Granleigh Road
Maidstone United	Gallagher Stadium
Oxford City	Marsh Lane
St Albans City	Clarence Park
Sutton United	Gander Green Lane
Tooting & Mitcham United	Imperial Fields
Walthamstow Avenue	Green Pond Road
Wimbledon	Plough Lane
Woking	The Laithwaite Community Stadium
Wycombe Wanderers	Adams Park
