= 1910–11 Isthmian League =

The 1910–11 season was the sixth in the history of the Isthmian League, an English football competition.

Clapton were champions, winning their first Isthmian League title. At the end of the season Bromley resigned from the league.

== League table ==
Isthmian League
- Season: 1910–11
- Champions: Clapton
- Matches: 90
- Goals: 324 (3.6 per match)

Pos	Team	Pld	W	D	L	GF	GA	GR	Pts	Results
1	Clapton	18	11	4	3	39	19	2.053	26	
2	Leytonstone	18	12	1	5	47	30	1.567	25	
3	Dulwich Hamlet	18	8	5	5	28	22	1.273	21	
4	Oxford City	18	7	4	7	32	43	0.744	18	
5	Ilford	18	8	1	9	41	32	1.281	17	
6	Shepherd's Bush	18	7	3	8	31	27	1.148	17	
7	Bromley	18	8	4	6	32	27	1.185	16 (Note: Bromley were deducted 4 points.)	Resigned from league at end of the season
8	Nunhead	18	5	4	9	32	36	0.889	14	
9	West Norwood	18	4	5	9	24	43	0.558	13	
10	London Caledonians	18	3	3	12	18	45	0.400	9	

Source: fchd.com rsssf.com
Rules for classification: 1) points; 2) goal ratio.
