= Dulwich Hamlet F.C. =

Association football club in London, England

Dulwich Hamlet
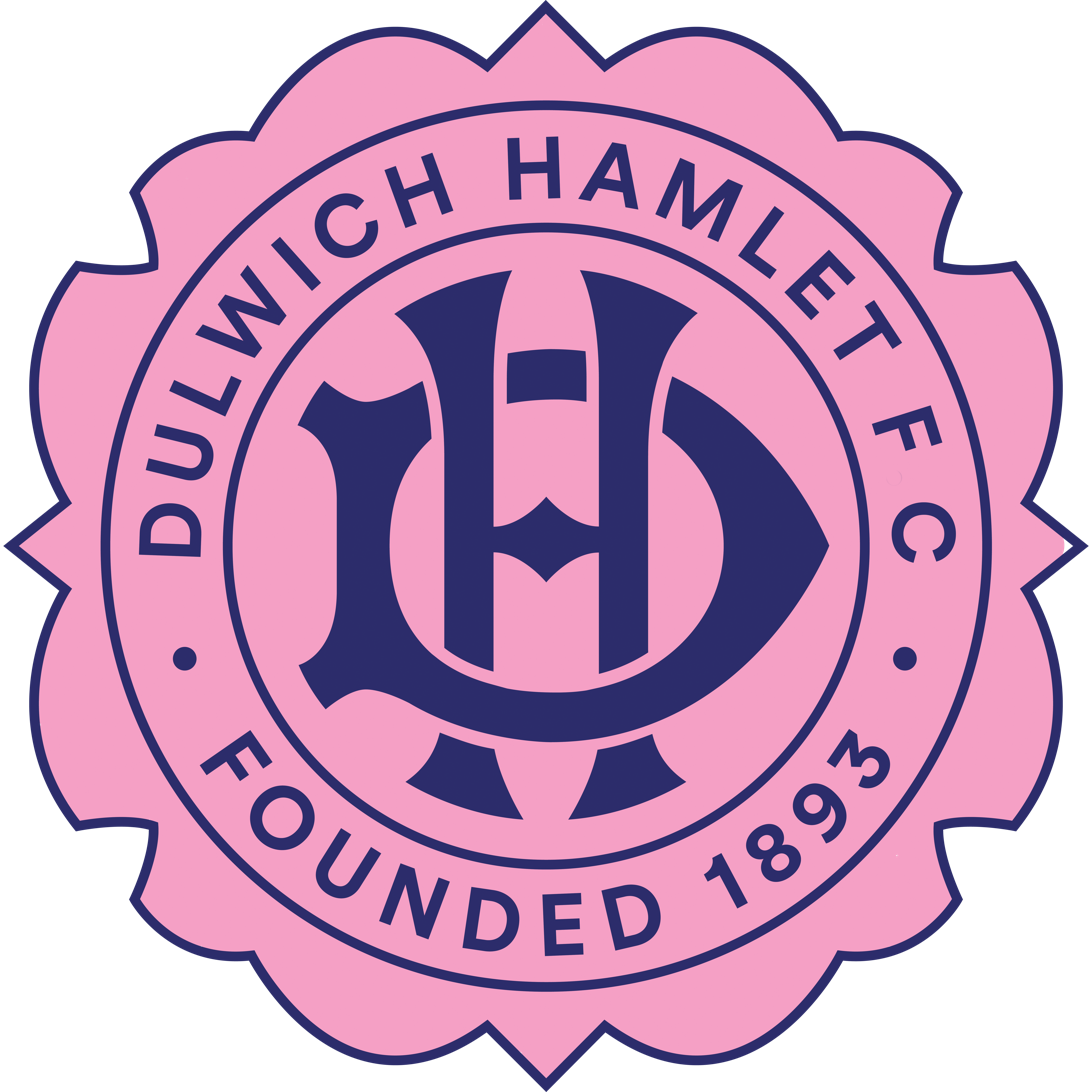
- Full name: Dulwich Hamlet Football Club
- Nickname: The Hamlet
- Founded: 1893
- Ground: Champion Hill, East Dulwich, London
- Capacity: 3,334 (500 seated)
- Chairman: Ben Clasper
- Manager: Mark Dacey
- League: Isthmian League Premier Division
- 2025–26: Isthmian League Premier Division, 9th of 22
- Website: dulwichhamletfc.co.uk
| Home colours | Away colours |

Dulwich Hamlet Football Club is a semi-professional football club based in East Dulwich in south-east London, England. They are currently members of the Isthmian League Premier Division, the seventh tier of English football, and play at Champion Hill.

== History ==
The club was formed in 1893, by Lorraine 'Pa' Wilson. They were founder members of the Dulwich League in 1899, and were its inaugural champions. The club went on to retain the title the following season. In 1907 they joined both the Isthmian League and the Spartan League, leaving the latter at the end of the 1907–08 season. In 1919–20 the club won its first Isthmian League title, winning the league on goal average against Nunhead. They also won the FA Amateur Cup, beating Tufnell Park 1–0 in the final at the Den. The club won the league again in 1925–26, and the FA Amateur Cup for a second time in 1931–32 win a 7–1 win against Marine in the final. The following season the club won their third league title. In 1933–34 they won their third FA Amateur Cup, beating Leyton 2–1 in the final. The two clubs met in the final again in 1936–37, with Dulwich winning 2–0.

In 1948–49 Dulwich won the Isthmian League for a fourth time. The 1976–77 season saw the club finish bottom of Division One, resulting in relegation to Division Two, which was renamed Division One the following season, with Division One becoming the Premier Division. The club went on to win the Division One title in 1977–78 and were promoted back to the Premier Division. They finished bottom of the Premier Division in 1989–90, and were relegated to Division One. The club were promoted back to the Premier Division at the end of the 1991–92 season after finishing third in Division One. In 1998–99 they reached the first round of the FA Cup for the first time since 1948, losing 1–0 to Southport.

After finishing bottom of the Premier Division in 2000–01, the club were relegated back to Division One. After finishing seventh in 2003–04, the club played off against Wealdstone for a place in the Premier Division after league restructuring but lost 5–4 on penalties after a 2–2 draw. In 2010–11 Dulwich finished fifth and entered the promotion play-offs, beating Bognor Regis Town 3–1 in the semi-finals before losing 4–3 to Leatherhead in the final. The following season the club finished third, again qualifying for the promotion play-offs. After beating Folkestone Invicta 2–1 in the semi-finals, they lost the final 1–0 to Bognor Regis. They returned to the Premier Division after winning the Division One South title on the last day of the 2012–13 season with a 1–1 draw against Burgess Hill Town.

In 2014–15 Dulwich finished fourth in the Premier Division, qualifying for the play-offs. However, they lost 2–1 at Margate in the semi-finals. The following season the club finished fifth, and reached the play-off final after winning 1–0 at Bognor Regis Town in the semi-final, before going on to lose 3–1 at East Thurrock United. In 2016–17 Dulwich finished third in the Premier Division, qualifying for the play-offs for the third season in a row. After beating Enfield Town 4–2 in the semi-finals, they lost 2–1 at Bognor Regis Town in the final. The following season saw the club finish as runners-up in the Premier Division. In the subsequent play-offs, they beat Leiston 1–0 in the semi-final, before defeating Hendon 4–3 on penalties following a 1–1 draw in the final to earn promotion to the National League South.

The 2019–20 season saw Dulwich reach the first round of the FA Cup, with the club losing 4–1 at home to Carlisle United. In 2022–23 the club finished fourth-from-bottom of the National League South and were relegated to the Isthmian League Premier Division.

=== Season-by-season record ===
| Season | League | P | W | D | L | GF | GA | Pts | Pos | FA Cup | FA Trophy | FA Amateur |
|---|---|---|---|---|---|---|---|---|---|---|---|---|
| 1906–07 | - | - | - | - | - | - | - | - | - | | - | R2 |
| 1907–08 | Isthmian League | 10 | 3 | 2 | 5 | 15 | 18 | 8 | 5th | | - | |
| 1907–08 | Spartan League | 10 | 4 | 1 | 5 | 19 | 20 | 9 | 4th | | - | |
| 1908–09 | Isthmian League | 18 | 9 | 2 | 7 | 39 | 30 | 20 | 4th | | - | SF |
| 1909–10 | Isthmian League | 18 | 8 | 4 | 6 | 26 | 26 | 20 | 5th | | - | |
| 1910–11 | Isthmian League | 18 | 8 | 5 | 5 | 28 | 22 | 21 | 3rd | | - | |
| 1911–12 | Isthmian League | 20 | 8 | 5 | 7 | 33 | 23 | 21 | 4th | | - | QF |
| 1912–13 | Isthmian League | 20 | 8 | 4 | 8 | 34 | 28 | 20 | 5th | | - | |
| 1913–14 | Isthmian League | 20 | 10 | 4 | 6 | 34 | 22 | 24 | 4th | | - | QFr |
| 1919 | Isthmian League | 8 | 3 | 2 | 3 | 19 | 17 | 8 | 3rd | | - | |
| 1919–20 | Isthmian League | 22 | 15 | 3 | 4 | 58 | 16 | 33 | 1st | 5Q | - | W |
| 1920–21 | Isthmian League | 22 | 11 | 6 | 5 | 60 | 30 | 28 | 5th | 5Q | - | |
| 1921–22 | Isthmian League | 26 | 14 | 8 | 4 | 65 | 24 | 36 | 2nd | 5Q | - | SFr |
| 1922–23 | Isthmian League | 26 | 9 | 7 | 10 | 60 | 44 | 25 | 8th | 5Qr | - | QFr |
| 1923–24 | Isthmian League | 26 | 15 | 6 | 5 | 49 | 28 | 36 | 2nd | | - | |
| 1924–25 | Isthmian League | 26 | 8 | 5 | 13 | 42 | 57 | 21 | 12th | 5Q | - | |
| 1925–26 | Isthmian League | 26 | 20 | 1 | 5 | 80 | 49 | 41 | 1st | R1 | - | |
| 1926–27 | Isthmian League | 26 | 9 | 4 | 13 | 60 | 58 | 22 | 9th | R1 | - | QF |
| 1927–28 | Isthmian League | 26 | 8 | 9 | 9 | 56 | 49 | 25 | 9th | R1 | - | |
| 1928–29 | Isthmian League | 26 | 14 | 6 | 6 | 65 | 34 | 34 | 3rd | R1 | - | SF |
| 1929–30 | Isthmian League | 26 | 15 | 6 | 5 | 74 | 39 | 36 | 2nd | R1 | - | QF |
| 1930–31 | Isthmian League | 26 | 12 | 9 | 5 | 51 | 39 | 33 | 2nd | R1r | - | |
| 1931–32 | Isthmian League | 26 | 15 | 3 | 8 | 69 | 43 | 33 | 3rd | 4Q | - | W |
| 1932–33 | Isthmian League | 26 | 15 | 6 | 5 | 71 | 45 | 36 | 1st | R1 | - | QF |
| 1933–34 | Isthmian League | 26 | 15 | 5 | 6 | 68 | 36 | 35 | 2nd | R1r | - | SF |
| 1934–35 | Isthmian League | 26 | 11 | 7 | 8 | 66 | 45 | 29 | 4th | R1 | - | W |
| 1935–36 | Isthmian League | 26 | 10 | 8 | 8 | 64 | 47 | 28 | 4th | R1 | - | R3 |
| 1936–37 | Isthmian League | 26 | 12 | 6 | 8 | 64 | 48 | 30 | 5th | R1 | - | W |
| 1937–38 | Isthmian League | 26 | 13 | 3 | 10 | 57 | 46 | 29 | 6th | R1 | - | QF |
| 1938–39 | Isthmian League | 26 | 15 | 5 | 6 | 60 | 32 | 35 | 4th | 4Q | - | |
| 1945–46 | Isthmian League | 26 | 14 | 2 | 10 | 63 | 59 | 30 | 4th | 4Q | - | |
| 1946–47 | Isthmian League | 26 | 17 | 3 | 6 | 78 | 46 | 37 | 2nd | 4Q | - | |
| 1947–48 | Isthmian League | 26 | 17 | 2 | 7 | 71 | 39 | 36 | 4th | 4Q | - | QF |
| 1948–49 | Isthmian League | 26 | 15 | 6 | 5 | 60 | 31 | 36 | 1st | R1 | - | |
| 1949–50 | Isthmian League | 26 | 14 | 3 | 9 | 60 | 47 | 31 | 5th | 4Qr | - | R3 |
| 1950–51 | Isthmian League | 26 | 14 | 2 | 10 | 54 | 43 | 30 | 5th | Pre | - | |
| 1951–52 | Isthmian League | 26 | 11 | 4 | 11 | 60 | 53 | 26 | 8th | | - | R3 |
| 1952–53 | Isthmian League | 28 | 15 | 2 | 11 | 62 | 52 | 32 | 6th | 2Qr | - | |
| 1953–54 | Isthmian League | 28 | 11 | 6 | 11 | 55 | 57 | 28 | 9th | 1Q | - | |
| 1954–55 | Isthmian League | 28 | 7 | 5 | 16 | 48 | 60 | 19 | 14th | 1Qr | - | |
| 1955–56 | Isthmian League | 28 | 9 | 6 | 13 | 55 | 67 | 24 | 13th | Pre | - | SF |
| 1956–57 | Isthmian League | 28 | 13 | 3 | 14 | 65 | 54 | 29 | 9th | Pre | - | R3 |
| 1957–58 | Isthmian League | 30 | 7 | 7 | 16 | 49 | 64 | 21 | 14th | 2Q | - | |
| 1958–59 | Isthmian League | 30 | 18 | 5 | 7 | 68 | 44 | 41 | 2nd | 1Q | - | |
| 1959–60 | Isthmian League | 30 | 14 | 6 | 10 | 65 | 47 | 34 | 7th | 1Q | - | |
| 1960–61 | Isthmian League | 30 | 17 | 4 | 9 | 71 | 59 | 38 | 4th | 2Q | - | |
| 1961–62 | Isthmian League | 30 | 11 | 4 | 15 | 55 | 66 | 26 | 11th | 4Q | - | |
| 1962–63 | Isthmian League | 30 | 4 | 5 | 21 | 30 | 71 | 13 | 15th | 3Q | - | |
| 1963–64 | Isthmian League | 38 | 6 | 12 | 20 | 47 | 97 | 24 | 19th | 1Q | - | |
| 1964–65 | Isthmian League | 38 | 8 | 5 | 25 | 45 | 79 | 21 | 18th | 1Qr | - | |
| 1965–66 | Isthmian League | 38 | 5 | 5 | 28 | 30 | 95 | 15 | 20th | 2Q | - | |
| 1966–67 | Isthmian League | 38 | 3 | 4 | 31 | 33 | 107 | 10 | 20th | 2Q | - | |
| 1967–68 | Isthmian League | 38 | 10 | 7 | 21 | 39 | 66 | 27 | 15th | 2Q | - | R2r |
| 1968–69 | Isthmian League | 38 | 6 | 9 | 23 | 31 | 77 | 21 | 18th | 1Q | - | R2 |
| 1969–70 | Isthmian League | 38 | 8 | 12 | 18 | 46 | 66 | 28 | 14th | 1Q | - | |
| 1970–71 | Isthmian League | 38 | 7 | 10 | 21 | 30 | 66 | 24 | 17th | 2Q | - | R2r |
| 1971–72 | Isthmian League | 40 | 4 | 12 | 24 | 35 | 81 | 20 | 20th | 2Q | - | |
| 1972–73 | Isthmian League | 42 | 18 | 9 | 15 | 59 | 52 | 45 | 12th | 1Q | - | |
| 1973–74 | Isthmian League Division One | 42 | 22 | 11 | 9 | 71 | 38 | 77 | 4th | 1Q | - | QFr |
| 1974–75 | Isthmian League Division One | 42 | 24 | 10 | 8 | 75 | 38 | 82 | 5th | 1Q | 3Q | - |
| 1975–76 | Isthmian League Division One | 42 | 22 | 5 | 15 | 67 | 41 | 71 | 5th | 3Qr | R1 | - |
| 1976–77 | Isthmian League Division One | 42 | 11 | 8 | 23 | 52 | 68 | 41 | 21st | 3Q | 3Q | - |
| 1977–78 | Isthmian League Division One | 42 | 28 | 9 | 5 | 91 | 25 | 93 | 1st | 2Qr | 2Q | - |
| 1978–79 | Isthmian League Premier Division | 42 | 21 | 13 | 8 | 69 | 39 | 76 | 4th | 3Qr | 3Q | - |
| 1979–80 | Isthmian League Premier Division | 42 | 21 | 16 | 5 | 66 | 37 | 79 | 3rd | 2Q | QFr | - |
| 1980–81 | Isthmian League Premier Division | 42 | 13 | 12 | 17 | 62 | 67 | 51 | 15th | 3Q | R1 | - |
| 1981–82 | Isthmian League Premier Division | 42 | 14 | 10 | 18 | 47 | 59 | 52 | 14th | 2Q | R1r | - |
| 1982–83 | Isthmian League Premier Division | 42 | 18 | 14 | 10 | 59 | 52 | 68 | 6th | 3Qr | R2r | - |
| 1983–84 | Isthmian League Premier Division | 42 | 16 | 11 | 15 | 61 | 64 | 59 | 10th | 2Q | R3r2 | - |
| 1984–85 | Isthmian League Premier Division | 42 | 16 | 17 | 9 | 82 | 57 | 65 | 7th | 1Q | R2 | - |
| 1985–86 | Isthmian League Premier Division | 42 | 17 | 9 | 16 | 64 | 79 | 60 | 9th | 2Qr | R1r | - |
| 1986–87 | Isthmian League Premier Division | 42 | 12 | 10 | 20 | 62 | 71 | 46 | 18th | 2Q | R1 | - |
| 1987–88 | Isthmian League Premier Division | 42 | 10 | 11 | 21 | 46 | 64 | 41 | 20th | 1Q | 3Q | - |
| 1988–89 | Isthmian League Premier Division | 42 | 12 | 12 | 18 | 58 | 57 | 48 | 16th | 4Qr | 2Q | - |
| 1989–90 | Isthmian League Premier Division | 42 | 6 | 8 | 28 | 32 | 80 | 26 | 22nd | 4Qr | 1Q | - |
| 1990–91 | Isthmian League Division One | 42 | 16 | 11 | 15 | 67 | 54 | 59 | 12th | 1Q | 1Qr | - |
| 1991–92 | Isthmian League Division One | 40 | 22 | 9 | 9 | 71 | 40 | 75 | 3rd | 2Q | 2Q | - |
| 1992–93 | Isthmian League Premier Division | 42 | 12 | 14 | 16 | 52 | 66 | 50 | 14th | 1Q | 3Q | - |
| 1993–94 | Isthmian League Premier Division | 42 | 13 | 8 | 21 | 52 | 74 | 47 | 16th | 1Q | R1 | - |
| 1994–95 | Isthmian League Premier Division | 42 | 16 | 9 | 17 | 70 | 82 | 57 | 11th | 3Q | 2Q | - |
| 1995–96 | Isthmian League Premier Division | 42 | 23 | 11 | 8 | 85 | 59 | 80 | 5th | 3Q | 1Qr2 | - |
| 1996–97 | Isthmian League Premier Division | 42 | 14 | 13 | 15 | 57 | 57 | 55 | 12th | 2Q | R2 | - |
| 1997–98 | Isthmian League Premier Division | 42 | 13 | 11 | 18 | 56 | 67 | 50 | 16th | 2Q | R1 | - |
| 1998–99 | Isthmian League Premier Division | 42 | 14 | 8 | 20 | 53 | 63 | 20 | 16th | R1 | R3 | - |
| 1999–00 | Isthmian League Premier Division | 42 | 17 | 5 | 20 | 62 | 68 | 56 | 10th | 4Qr | R2r | - |
| 2000–01 | Isthmian League Premier Division | 42 | 4 | 10 | 28 | 33 | 84 | 22 | 22nd | 4Q | R1r | - |
| 2001–02 | Isthmian League Division One | 42 | 11 | 13 | 18 | 64 | 68 | 76 | 17th | Pre | R3 | - |
| 2002–03 | Isthmian League Division One South | 46 | 23 | 12 | 11 | 73 | 49 | 81 | 4th | Pre(r) | R3 | - |
| 2003–04 | Isthmian League Division One South | 46 | 23 | 15 | 8 | 77 | 57 | 84 | 7th | Pre | R1r | - |
| 2004–05 | Isthmian League Division One | 42 | 10 | 14 | 18 | 61 | 64 | 44 | 15th | 3Q | R1r | - |
| 2005–06 | Isthmian League Division One | 44 | 19 | 8 | 17 | 55 | 43 | 65 | 13th | 3Q | 1Qr | - |
| 2006–07 | Isthmian League Division One South | 42 | 18 | 13 | 11 | 83 | 56 | 67 | 8th | 1Q | Pre(r) | - |
| 2007–08 | Isthmian League Division One South | 42 | 20 | 10 | 12 | 68 | 47 | 70 | 6th | 3Q | Pre | - |
| 2008–09 | Isthmian League Division One South | 42 | 15 | 15 | 12 | 64 | 50 | 57 | 12th | 2Qr | 2Q | - |
| 2009–10 | Isthmian League Division One South | 42 | 14 | 12 | 16 | 57 | 64 | 54 | 12th | 1Q | Pre | - |
| 2010–11 | Isthmian League Division One South | 42 | 19 | 8 | 15 | 79 | 59 | 65 | 5th | Pre(r) | 2Q | - |
| 2011–12 | Isthmian League Division One South | 40 | 26 | 8 | 6 | 73 | 26 | 86 | 3rd | 2Q | 1Q | - |
| 2012–13 | Isthmian League Division One South | 42 | 28 | 5 | 9 | 91 | 42 | 89 | 1st | 2Q | Pre | - |
| 2013–14 | Isthmian League Premier Division | 46 | 25 | 7 | 14 | 96 | 65 | 82 | 6th | 3Q | 3Qr | - |
| 2014–15 | Isthmian League Premier Division | 46 | 21 | 13 | 12 | 66 | 51 | 76 | 4th | 1Q | 2Q | - |
| 2015–16 | Isthmian League Premier Division | 46 | 23 | 12 | 11 | 93 | 58 | 81 | 5th | 2Q | R2 | - |
| 2016–17 | Isthmian League Premier Division | 46 | 22 | 14 | 10 | 89 | 55 | 80 | 3rd | 2Q | QFr | - |
| 2017–18 | Isthmian League Premier Division | 46 | 28 | 11 | 7 | 91 | 41 | 95 | 2nd | 2Q | 2Q | - |
| 2018–19 | National League South | 42 | 23 | 10 | 19 | 52 | 65 | 49 | 14th | 3Q | R1 | - |
| 2019–20 | National League South | 35 | 9 | 10 | 16 | 51 | 50 | 37 | 19th | R1 | R1 | - |
| 2020–21 | National League South | 13 | 4 | 4 | 6 | 15 | 17 | 16 | aband | 4Q | R3 | - |
| 2021–22 | National League South | 40 | 13 | 12 | 15 | 63 | 60 | 51 | 10th | 2Q | R3 | - |
| 2022–23 | National League South | 46 | 13 | 9 | 24 | 61 | 89 | 48 | 21st | 3Q | R2 | - |
| 2023–24 | Isthmian League Premier Division | 42 | 17 | 11 | 14 | 77 | 72 | 62 | 12th | 1Qr | 3Q | - |
| 2024–25 | Isthmian League Premier Division | 42 | 12 | 8 | 22 | 58 | 80 | 44 | 18th | 1Qr | R1 | - |
| 2025–26 | Isthmian League Premier Division | 42 | 17 | 11 | 14 | 61 | 53 | 62 | 9th | 1Qr | 3Q | - |
| 2026–27 | Isthmian League Premier Division | | | | | | | | | | | - |
Source: FCHD, Soccer Books

== Ground ==
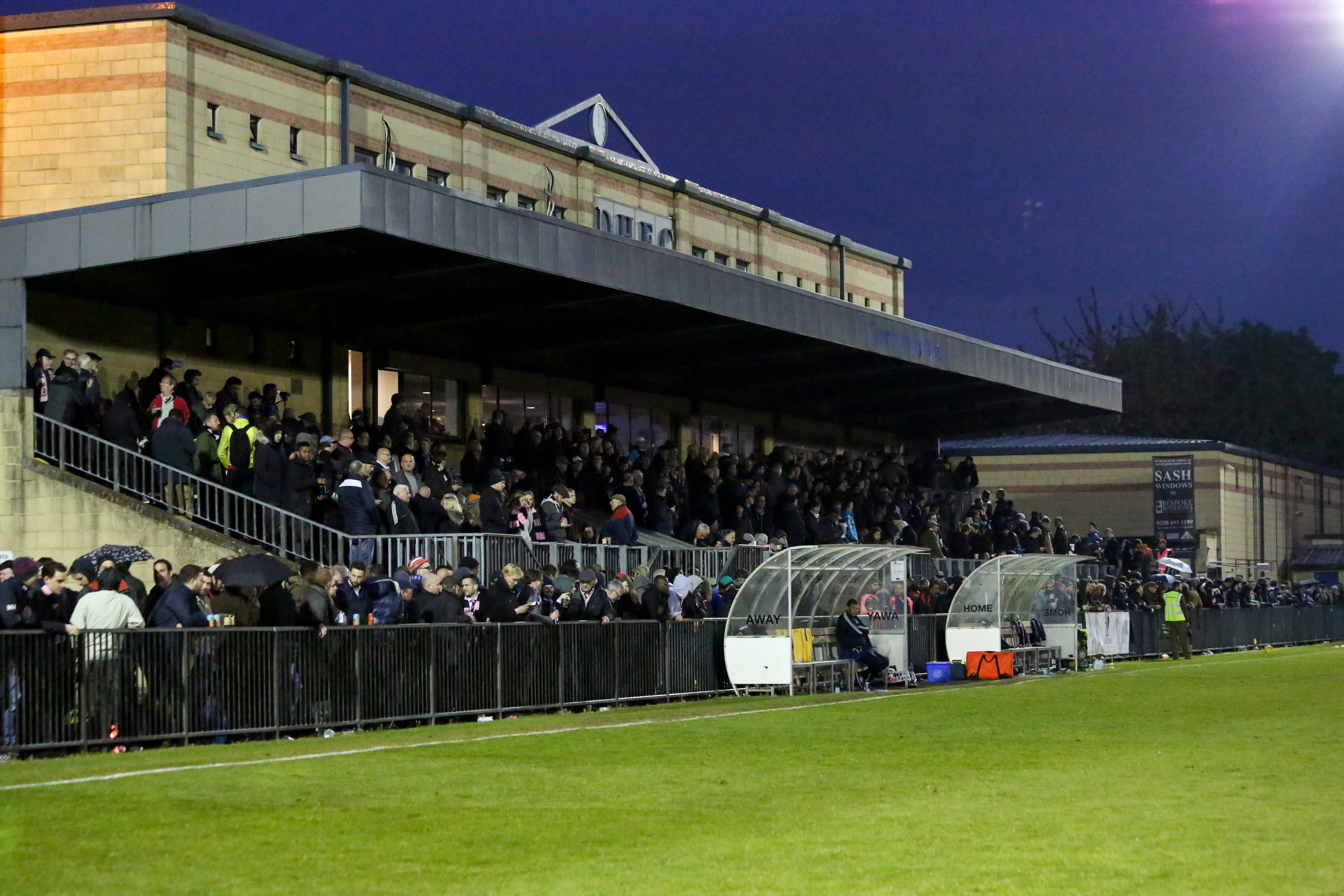
Champion Hill main stand, and dugouts in April 2017

The club played at Woodwarde Road until 1895, when they moved to College Farm. The following year they moved to Sunray Avenue, where they remained until 1902. Between 1902 and 1912 they played at Freeman's Ground on Champion Hill, before moving to an adjacent plot of land, where they played until the opening of the Champion Hill stadium in 1931. The stadium was used for amateur international matches, including the 1948 Summer Olympics.

The Champion Hill stadium gained notoriety as a film location for very first episode of The Sweeney TV series, with a scene shot in May 1974, with the two main characters Jack Regan (John Thaw) and George Carter (Dennis Waterman) meeting a villain Driscoll (Ray Mort) in the south stand.

In 1991 the stadium was demolished, as it was too run-down and dangerous to bring up to modern safety standards, as a result of new regulations brought in as a result of the Hillsborough disaster. During the 1991–92 season the club played at Tooting & Mitcham United's Sandy Lane ground, whilst a new, smaller stadium was built on the same site, opening for the start of the 1992–93 season. The new stadium was funded by the sale to Sainsbury's of land that had once been the club's training pitch, situated immediately behind the large covered terrace on the north side of the 'old' Champion Hill, by the landlords King's College London. The new ground remained in King's ownership, with the club having given up the lease on the old ground in return for the new ground being built.

In September 2013 it became the first football ground in Greater London to be listed as an Asset of community value, but this was withdrawn by Southwark Council not long after, due to a legal technicality. In February 2014, Champion Hill was bought for £5.7m by Meadow Residential. In March 2018 the company forced the club out of the ground, resulting in a temporary groundshare with rivals Tooting & Mitcham, at their Imperial Fields stadium, which lasted until Dulwich returned to Champion Hill in December 2018.

== Players ==
=== Current squad ===
As of 7 November 2026

Note: Flags indicate national team as defined under FIFA eligibility rules; some limited exceptions apply. Players may hold more than one non-FIFA nationality.

| Pos. | Nation | Player |
|---|---|---|
| GK | | Toby Bull |
| GK | ENG | Hudson Sands (on loan from Chelsea) |
| DF | | Ibrahim Bangura |
| DF | | Michael Chambers |
| DF | | Tom Chambers |
| DF | | Kyron McKay |
| DF | | Tahreem Monteiro |
| DF | | Jamie Splatt |
| MF | | Sean Bonnett-Johnson |
| MF | | Solomon Baugh |
| MF | IRL | Samir Carruthers |
| MF | | Nyren Clunis |

| Pos. | Nation | Player |
|---|---|---|
| MF | ENG | Amadou Kassaraté |
| MF | | Gaspar Mico |
| MF | ENG | Jadan Raymond (on loan at AFC Croydon Athletic) |
| MF | | Lonit Talla |
| MF | | Luke Wanadio |
| MF | ENG | Jordan Wynter |
| MF | | Keidi Xhika |
| MF | | Koby Yeboah |
| FW | ENG | Danny Mills |
| FW | | Ogo Obi |
| FW | | David Smith |
| FW | IRL | Shaun Wade (on loan from Chelsea) |

=== Internationally-capped players ===
During the 1920s the club had two players capped by the full England team. Bert Coleman was capped whilst playing for Dulwich in 1921, whilst Edgar Kail won three caps against France, Belgium and Spain in 1929. Kail was the last amateur player to play for England whilst solely with an amateur club, and shunned many approaches from professional clubs to stay with Dulwich Hamlet, his local side, for whom he scored over 400 goals, and is still the subject of terrace songs by fans of the club.

== Backroom staff ==
As of August 2026

| Position | Name |
|---|---|
| Manager | Mark Dacey |
| Assistant Manager | Junior James |
| Coach | Ryan King-Elliott |
| Goalkeepeing Coach | Matt Blendell |
| Physio | Carly Payne |
| Analytics | Hernan Rivero |
| Strength & Conditioning | Bafor Aganbi |

=== Managerial history ===
From 1966 onwards:

| Years | Manager |
|---|---|
| 1966–1967 | Frank Reed |
| 1967–1971 | Peter Gleeson |
| 1971–1972 | Fred Setter |
| 1972–1976 | Jimmy Rose |
| 1976–1977 | George Rocknean |
| 1977 | Jimmy Langley |
| 1977–1981 | Alan Smith |
| 1981–1984 | Eddie Presland |
| 1984–1986 | Billy Smith |
| 1986 | Allen Batsford |
| 1986–1987 | Micky Leach |
| 1987 | Ray Thorn |
| 1987 | Billy Edwards |
| 1987–1989 | Eddie Presland |
| 1989–1990 | John Langford |
| 1990–1991 | Joe Fascione |
| 1991–1994 | Jim Cannon |
| 1994–1997 | Frank Murphy |
| 1997 | John Ryan & Mick Browne |
| 1997–2000 | Dave Garland |
| 2000–2001 | Les Cleevely |
| 2001 | Gwynne Berry |
| 2001–2006 | Martin Eede |
| 2006–2007 | Wayne Burnett |
| 2007–2009 | Craig Edwards |
| 2009–2022 | Gavin Rose |
| 2022–2023 | Paul Barnes |
| 2023–2025 | Hakan Hayrettin |
| 2025 | Bradley Quinton |
| 2025– | Mark Dacey |

== Supporters ==
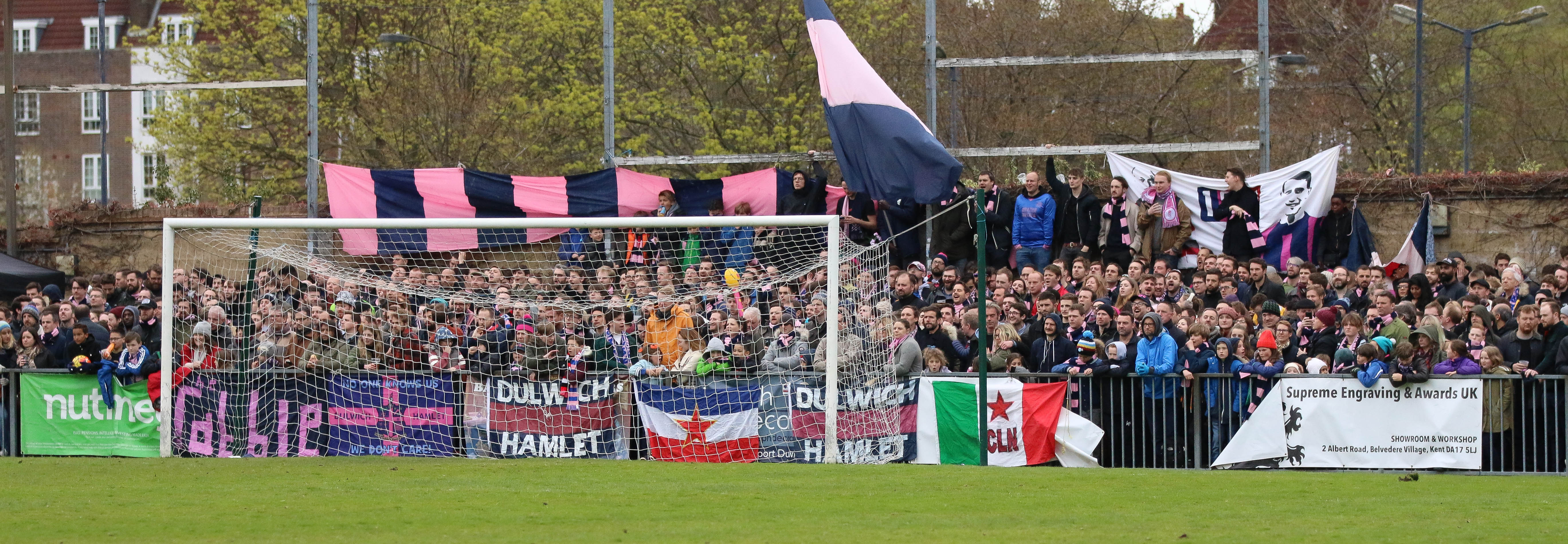
Dulwich Hamlet FC supporters in April 2016. Flags for Communist Yugoslavia and the National Liberation Committee of Italy can be seen amongst them.

Dulwich Hamlet supporters are explicitly progressive in political orientation, with a focus on anti-racism, anti-sexism, anti-fascism, and inclusivity across gender, sexuality, and ethnicity. Fan groups such as The Rabble and the ComFast Chapter combine political messaging with fan engagement, supporting initiatives like fan-funded player signings, LGBT-inclusive events including matches against Stonewall FC, and local charitable projects such as winter clothing collections for Wrap Up London. Slogans used by Dulwich fans include "Communism is inevitable" and "Ordinary morality is for ordinary football clubs". Politics are visible in matchday culture through banners, chants, and fan activities, while the club maintains affordable ticket prices and encourages community participation. Supporters aim to provide an alternative to the commercialised and often aggressive culture found at higher-level professional football, fostering a participatory and locally oriented atmosphere. Over time, Dulwich Hamlet has gained recognition beyond its immediate area, drawing comparisons to Germany’s St Pauli for its combination of football support and social advocacy.

Despite being relegated, Dulwich Hamlet had the highest attendance in the National League South 2022–23, with an average attendance of 2,464. The club has gained a reputation for the activist element of their support, with the fans behind the goal going by the nickname of "The Rabble". In recent seasons, the Football Club Committee, Supporters Trust and fans have backed anti-discrimination and anti-homophobia initiatives, amongst many other initiatives within the community.

The efforts made by the club and all of its volunteers to ensure that the club connects with all parts of its local community were recognised in 2016, when they were awarded the Football Foundation Community Club Of The Year at the National Game Awards in London.

The Rabble has also gained a reputation for creating a party atmosphere during games and a creative and witty approach to songs and chanting.

=== Friendship with Altona 1893 and other European links ===
Hamlet fans have developed a friendship with supporters of German club Altona 1893, as the two clubs were founded in the same year, which began as a friendship started by the Dulwich Hamlet supporters' team. In recognition of the relationship, the club adopted the Altona 1893 home strip as their away strip during the 2014–15 and 2022–23 seasons, the club's 24–25 away strip also features the red and white of Altona 1893. On 12 July 2015, Altona 1893 and a large group of fans made the journey to South East London to play a friendly between the two sides. Altona 1893 won 5–3 on the day. In July 2015, Altona 1893 unveiled their new away strip in pink and blue colours, featuring a friendship logo on the sleeve. Dulwich Hamlet returned to Hamburg in July 2018 for a match against Altona 93 to commemorate the 125th anniversary of the founding of both clubs. The clubs met again in a fixture at Dulwich's Champion Hill ground on 7 July 2023.

== Honours ==
- FA Amateur Cup
  - Winners 1919–20, 1931–32, 1933–34, 1936–37
- Isthmian League
  - Champions 1919–20, 1925–26, 1932–33, 1948–49
  - Division One champions 1977–78
  - Division One South champions 2012–13
- Dulwich League
  - Champions 1899–1900, 1900–01
- London Senior Cup
  - Winners 1924–25, 1938–39, 1949–50, 1983–84, 2003–04
- Surrey Senior Cup
  - Winners 1904–05, 1905–06, 1908–09, 1909–10, 1919–20, 1922–23, 1924–25, 1927–28, 1933–34, 1936–37, 1946–47, 1949–50, 1957–58, 1958–59, 1973–74, 1974–75
- London Challenge Cup
  - Winners 1998–99
- London Junior Cup
  - Winners 1899–1900

== Records ==
- Most appearances: Reg Merritt, 576 (1950–1966)
- Most consecutive first team appearances: Chris Lewington, 290 (1977–1982)
- Most goals: Edgar Kail, 427 (1919–1933)
- Most goals in a season: Edgar Kail, 53 (1925–26)
- Biggest league win: 10–1 vs West Norwood, 1920–21, 9–0 vs Worthing, 1990–91
- Biggest cup win: 13–0 vs Walton-on-Thames, Surrey Senior Cup, 1936–37
- Heaviest league defeat: 0–9 vs Walthamstow Avenue, Isthmian League, 1945–46; 1–10 vs Hendon, Isthmian League, 1963–64
- Heaviest cup defeat: 0–9 vs Hornchurch, FA Cup third qualifying round, 2004–05
- Record attendance (old Champion Hill): 20,744, Kingstonian v Stockton, FA Amateur Cup Final (1932–33)
- Record attendance (new Champion Hill): 3,336 vs Carlisle United, FA Cup first round, 8 November 2019

== See also ==
- Dulwich Hamlet F.C. players
- Dulwich Hamlet F.C. managers
