= 1908–09 Isthmian League =

The 1908–09 season was the fourth in the history of the Isthmian League, an English football competition.

League expanded up to ten teams after Bromley, Leytonstone, Nunhead and Shepherd's Bush joined from the Spartan League. Bromley became champions in their inaugural season in the league.

== League table ==
Isthmian League
- Season: 1908–09
- Champions: Bromley
- Matches: 90
- Goals: 346 (3.84 per match)

Pos	Team	Pld	W	D	L	GF	GA	GR	Pts
1	Bromley	18	11	1	6	42	29	1.448	23
2	Leytonstone	18	9	4	5	43	31	1.387	22
3	Ilford	18	9	4	5	37	36	1.028	22
4	Dulwich Hamlet	18	9	2	7	39	30	1.300	20
5	Clapton	18	8	4	6	34	32	1.063	20
6	Oxford City	18	6	4	8	29	32	0.906	16
7	Nunhead	18	7	2	9	31	35	0.886	16
8	Shepherd's Bush	18	6	3	9	26	44	0.591	15
9	London Caledonians	18	4	6	8	25	34	0.735	14
10	West Norwood	18	5	2	11	40	43	0.930	12

Source: fchd.com rsssf.com
Rules for classification: 1) points; 2) goal ratio.
