= Hendon F.C. =

Association football club in London, England

Coordinates: 51°34′36″N 0°15′15″W

Hendon
- Full name: Hendon Football Club
- Nicknames: The Greens, The Dons
- Founded: 1908
- Ground: Silver Jubilee Park, Kingsbury
- Capacity: 1,990 (298 seated)
- Chairman: Cyrus Cooper
- Manager: Adam Fisher
- League: Isthmian League South Central Division
- 2025–26: Isthmian League South Central Division, 17th of 22
Home colours	Away colours

The Hampstead Town side of 1919–20

Hendon Football Club is a semi-professional football club based in north-west London. They play at Silver Jubilee Park in Kingsbury and are currently members of the Isthmian League South Central Division.

== History ==
The club was established as Christchurch Hampstead in 1908. They joined the Third Division of the Finchley & District League, which they won at the first attempt, earning promotion to Division Two. At the start of the 1909–10 season the club were renamed Hampstead Town and they went on to win Division Two at the first attempt, earning promotion to Division One. For the 1911–12 season the club entered teams into both Division One of the Finchley & District League and Division Two of the London League. They won the Finchley & District League title, and a fourth-place finish in Division Two of the London League saw the club promoted to Division One. They subsequently entered a team into the Middlesex League alongside the London League team.

In 1912–13 Hampstead Town were runners-up in Division One of the London League, earning promotion to the Premier Division (Amateur); they also won the Middlesex League. The following season saw them win both the Middlesex League and the Premier Division (Amateur) of the London League. This success saw the club admitted to the Athenian League for the 1914–15 season. However, the league was abandoned after two games due to World War I. After the war they played in the United Senior League in the 1918–19 season and won the league, before returning to the Athenian League when it restarted in 1919. The club was renamed Hampstead in 1926. They were Athenian League runners-up in 1928–29 and again in 1932–33, before being renamed Golders Green in 1933. They reached the first round of the FA Cup for the first time in 1934–35, losing 10–1 at Third Division South Southend United. In 1946 the club was renamed again, adopting its current name, that of a club that existed in the 19th century.

Hendon were Athenian League runners-up in 1947–48, 1948–49 and 1951–52 before winning their first Athenian League title in 1952–53, a season which also saw them reach the first round of the FA Cup again, losing 2–0 at Northampton Town in a replay. In 1954–55 they reached the final of the FA Amateur Cup, losing 2–0 to Bishop Auckland at Wembley. They went on to win the Athenian League title again in 1955–56, also reaching the second round of the FA Cup, beating Halesowen Town 4–2 in the first round before losing 6–2 at Exeter City in the second. The club won their first Amateur Cup in 1959–60, defeating Kingstonian 2–1 in the final. A third Athenian League title was won in 1960–61. In 1963 the club switched to the Isthmian League. They were runners-up in their first season in the league. In their second season, 1964–65, the club won the Isthmian League and Amateur Cup double, defeating Whitby Town 3–1 in the final.

Hendon reached the final of the FA Amateur Cup again the following season, but lost 3–1 to Wealdstone. After winning their third Amateur Cup with a 2–0 win against Enfield in 1971–72, the club won the Coppa Ottorino Barassi, a competition between the top amateur teams in England and Italy, beating Unione Valdinievole 3–1 over two legs. A second Isthmian League title was won in 1972–73 and the following season they reached the third round of the FA Cup, where they drew Newcastle United; after holding them to a 1–1 draw at St James' Park, Hendon lost 4–0 in a replay played at Watford's Vicarage Road. In 1975–76 the club defeated a Football League club for the first time, beating Reading 1–0 in the first round, before losing to Swindon Town in the second round.

In 2003–04 Hendon finished fourth in the Isthmian League Premier Division but declined to join the new Conference South. Having remained in the top division of the Isthmian League since joining it in 1963, Hendon finished in the relegation zone at the end of the 2005–06 season, but were reprieved after Canvey Island's resignation from the Football Conference. During the summer of 2010, the club was bought out by the Hendon FC Supporters Trust, an Industrial and Provident Society. In 2014–15 they were Premier Division runners-up, qualifying for the promotion play-offs; after beating Metropolitan Police 2–1 in the semi-finals, they lost the final 1–0 to Margate. The 2017–18 season saw the club finish third in the Premier Division. In the subsequent play-offs, they defeated Folkestone Invicta 4–0 in the semi-finals before losing the final 4–3 on penalties to Dulwich Hamlet. The club were placed in the Premier Division South of the Southern League for the 2018–19 season as part of the restructuring of the non-League pyramid.

At the end of the 2023–24 season Hendon were transferred back to the Premier Division of the Isthmian League. They finished fourth-from-bottom in 2024–25 and were relegated to the South Central Division.

== Ground ==
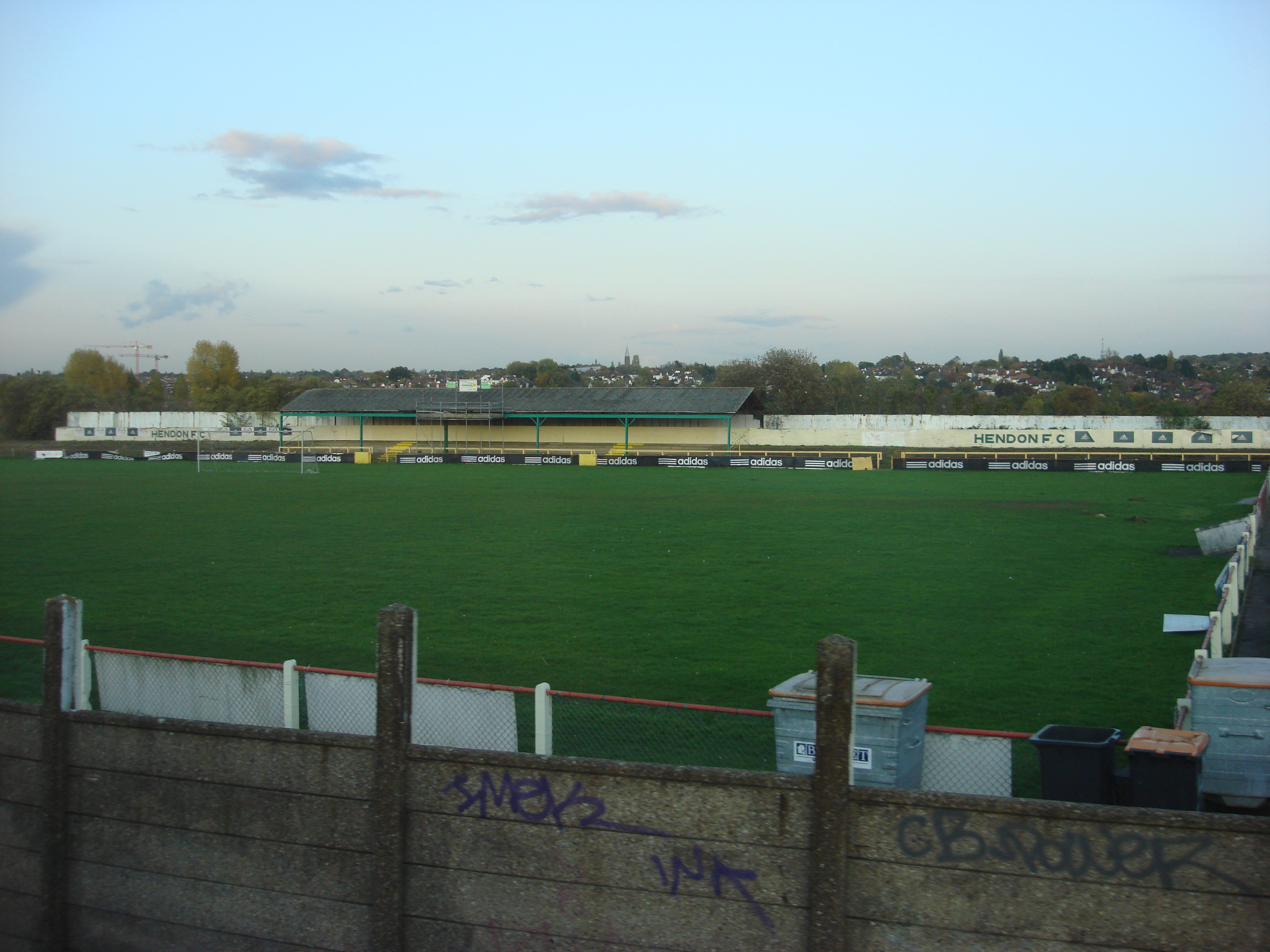
Claremont Road

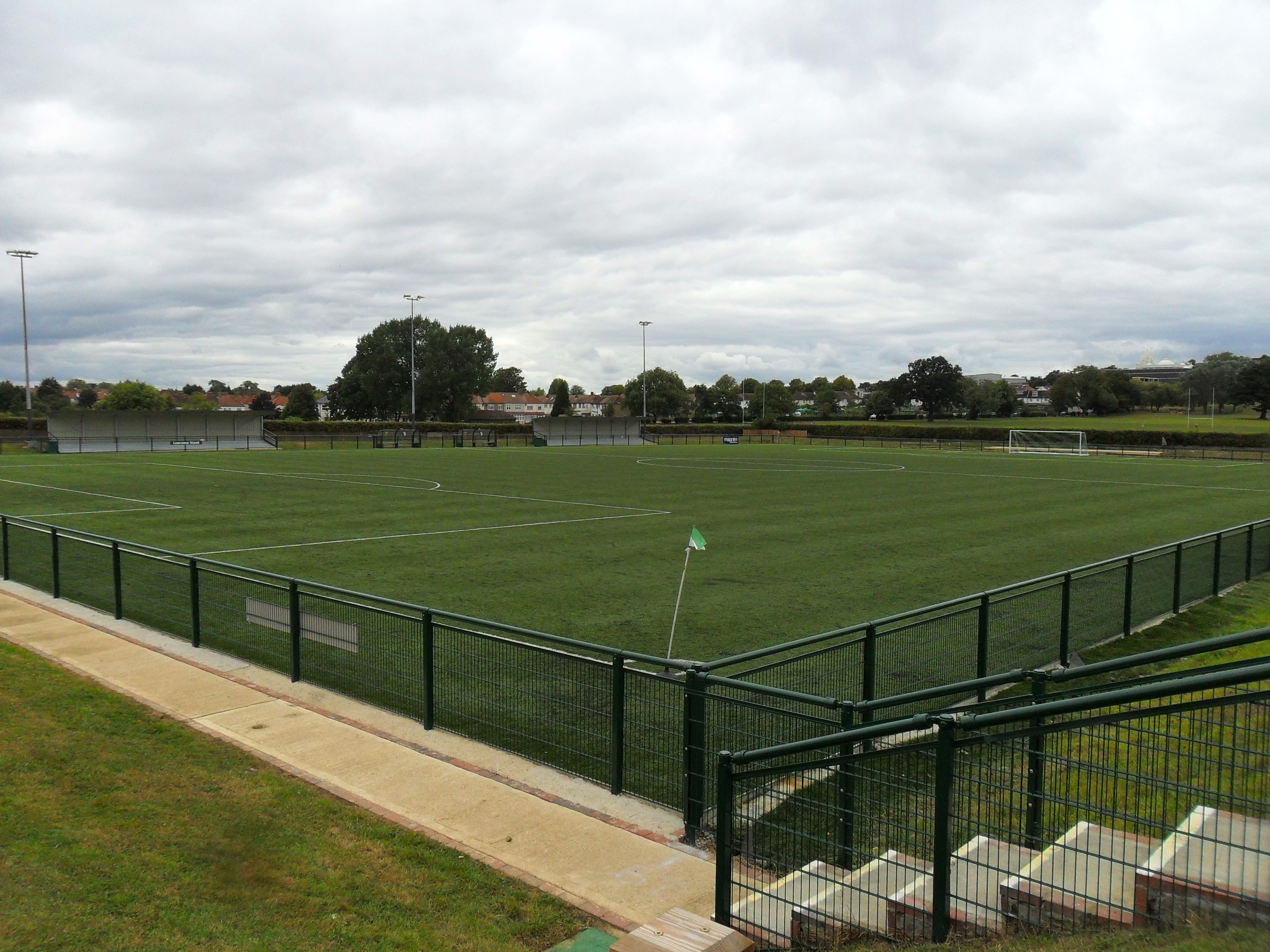
Silver Jubilee Park in September 2016

The club moved to Claremont Road in Cricklewood in 1926. The first match was played on 18 September, an FA Cup game against Berkhamsted that Hendon won 4–3. The ground was also briefly used by rugby league club London Broncos. In the mid-2000s the ground was sold to property developers and it was initially planned that the club would move to Barnet Copthall. However, the proposed move fell through after the death of the club's chairman and although Hendon had initially expected to leave in 2006, they were still at the ground in 2008; the final match at Claremont Road on 20 September 2008 saw local rivals Wealdstone win 4–1.

After leaving Claremont Road Hendon played at Northwood's Chestnut Avenue, Staines Town's Wheatsheaf Road for the remainder of the 2008–09 season. They then moved to Wembley's Vale Farm before relocating to Harrow Borough's Earlsmead ground in 2013. In 2016 they moved to Silver Jubilee Park in Kingsbury on a groundshare with Edgware Town.

== Coaching staff ==
Position	Staff
Manager	Adam Fisher
Assistant Manager	Jermaine Hall
Physiotherapist	Sophie Harrison
Fitness Coach	Ryan Watts
Source: Hendon F.C.

== Honours ==
- Coppa Ottorino Barassi
  - Winners 1972–73
- FA Amateur Cup
  - Winners 1959–60, 1964–65, 1971–72
- Isthmian League
  - Champions 1964–65, 1972–73
  - Full Members Cup winners 1994–95, 1997–98, 1998–99
  - League Cup winners 1976–77, 2014–15
- Athenian League
  - Champions 1952–53, 1955–56, 1960–61
- London League
  - Premier Division (Amateur) champions 1913–14
- United Senior League
  - Champions 1918–19
- Finchley & District League
  - Division One champions 1910–11
  - Division Two champions 1909–10
  - Division Three champions 1908–09
- Middlesex League
  - Champions 1912–13, 1913–14
- London Senior Cup
  - Winners 1963–64, 1968–69, 2008–09, 2011–12, 2014–15, 2019–20
- Middlesex Senior Cup
  - Winners 1933–34, 1938–39, 1955–56, 1957–58, 1959–60, 1964–65, 1966–67, 1971–72, 1972–73, 1973–74, 1985–86, 1998–99, 2001–02, 2002–03, 2003–04, 2017–18
- Middlesex Intermediate Cup
  - Winners 1964–65, 1966–67, 1972–73
- Middlesex Charity Cup
  - Winners 1921–22, 1926–27, 1935–36, 1944–45, 1945–46, 1946–47, 1947–48, 1953–54, 1956–57, 1975–76, 1976–77, 1978–79, 1984–5, 1987–88
- London Intermediate Cup
  - Winners 1962–63, 1964–65, 1972–73, 1975–76, 1979–80
- George Ruffell Memorial Shield
  - Winners 2001–02, 2003–04

== Records ==
- Best FA Cup performance: Third round, 1973–74
- Best FA Trophy performance: Fifth round, 1998–99, 2023–24
- Attendance: 9,000 v Northampton Town, FA Cup first round, 1952
- Most appearances: Bill Fisher, 787 (1940–1964)
- Most goals: Freddie Evans, 176 (1929–1935)
- Biggest win: 13–1 vs Wingate, Middlesex Senior Cup, 2 February 1957
- Heaviest defeat: 11–2 vs Walthamstow Avenue, Athenian League, 9 November 1935
- Record transfer fee received: £30,000 from Luton Town for Iain Dowie, 1988

== See also ==
- Hendon F.C. players
- Hendon F.C. managers
