= Kingfield Stadium =

Football stadium in Woking, Surrey, England

Laithwaite Community Stadium
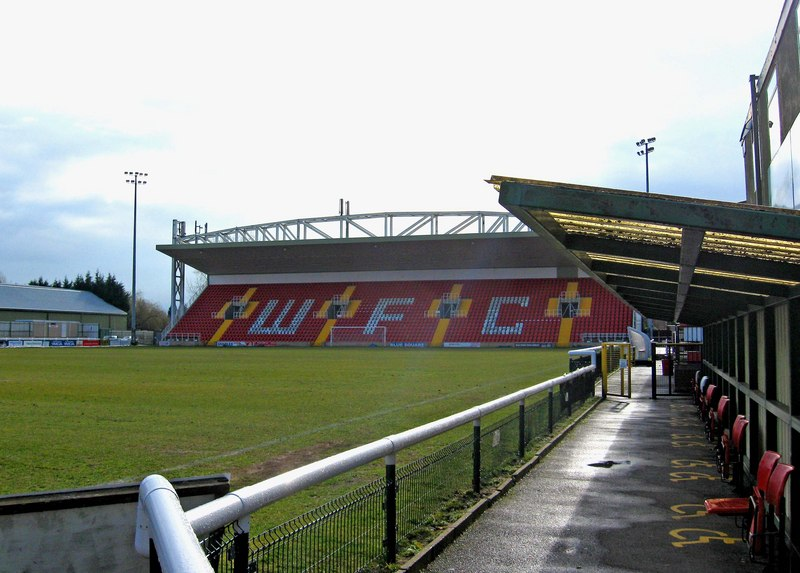
- Interactive map of Laithwaite Community Stadium
- Full name: The Laithwaite Community Stadium
- Location: Kingfield Road; Woking; Surrey; GU22 9AA
- Coordinates: 51°18′23″N 0°33′32″W
- Owner: Woking Borough Council
- Operator: Woking F.C.
- Surface: Grass
- Record attendance: 6,036
- Field size: 109 by 76 yards (100 m × 69 m)
- Public transit: Woking (0.8 miles (1.3 km))

Construction
- Built: 1921
- Opened: 5 June 1922
- Renovated: 1942, 1995

Tenants
- Woking F.C. (1922–); Hayes & Yeading United F.C. (2011–2014); Sheerwater F.C. (2018–2021)

Kingfield Stadium, currently known as The Laithwaite Community Stadium for sponsorship reasons, is a football stadium in the Kingfield area of Woking, Surrey, and is the home of Woking Football Club which has a capacity of approximately 6,000, of which 2,500 are seated on grandstands.

== Stands ==
The stadium has a number of structures, built at different times during its history.

=== Leslie Gosden Stand ===
The main stand, called the Leslie Gosden Stand, is the tallest structure on the ground. It has entirely covered seating. The stand was built in 1995 using financing from Woking Borough Council and represented the first of four phases of development.

=== Other stands ===
Opposite the Leslie Gosden Stand is the Kingfield Road End, which is a covered terrace. One side of the ground has two small seated stands and a small open terrace known as "moaners' corner". The other side is a long open terrace, called the Chris Lane Terrace, which is reserved for away fans when a match requires crowd segregation but can be used by anybody when there is no segregation in place. Above the Chris Lane Terrace there is a camera tower where the highlights are filmed from.

== Attendances ==
The record official attendance at the ground is 7,020 for the FA Amateur Cup match between Woking and Finchley in the 1957–58 season. Unofficial reports suggest as many as 8,100 were present when Woking played Charlton Athletic in the FA Cup 1st Round on November 27, 1926 but the official attendance that day is recorded as 5,593.

Woking's all-time record home league attendance at Kingfield came on Sunday 2 January 2022, when 5,171 spectators attended the 3-2 National League defeat against Aldershot Town. Commercial director Mick Livesey announced on Twitter the following day that it had beaten the previous record of 4,900 when Woking hosted Wycombe Wanderers back in 1992.

All-time highest attendance 7,020 v Finchley, FA Amateur Cup.

Average attendance - Woking F.C.

2024–25: 2,322 (National League)
2023–24: 2,717 (National League)
2022–23: 2,663 (National League)
2021–22: 2,703 (National League)
2020–21: 799 (National League) †
2019–20: 2,138 (National League)
2018–19: 2,210 (National League South)
2017–18: 2,076 (National League)
2016–17: 1,430 (National League)
2015–16: 1,634 (National League)
2014–15: 1,912 (Conference Premier)
2013–14: 1,601 (Conference Premier)
2012–13: 1,608 (Conference Premier)
2011–12: 1,833 (Conference South)
2010–11: 1,167 (Conference South)
2009–10: 1,335 (Conference South)
2008–09: 1,727 (Conference Premier)
2007–08: 1,757 (Conference Premier)
2006–07: 1,774 (Conference National)
2005–06: 1,949 (Conference National)
2004–05: 2,172 (Conference National)
2003–04: 2,321 (Conference National)

† COVID-19 pandemic

== Other uses ==
Hayes & Yeading United shared the use of the stadium for three seasons; 2011–12, 2012–13 and 2013–14.

As well as hosting Woking F.C. games, matches have also been played at The Laithwaite Community Stadium by the English National Game XI and the England women's U17 team. The ground also hosted an FA Women's cup semi-final in 2014.

Following the conclusion of the 2017–18 season, it was announced Sheerwater would ground-share for the 2018–19 and 2019–20 campaigns while the team's new ground was under construction.

== Nearby ==
- Woking station is 1 mile (1.6 km) north of the stadium and served by South Western Railway services from London Waterloo.
