= Champion Hill =

Football stadium in East Dulwich, London, England

- The Hill
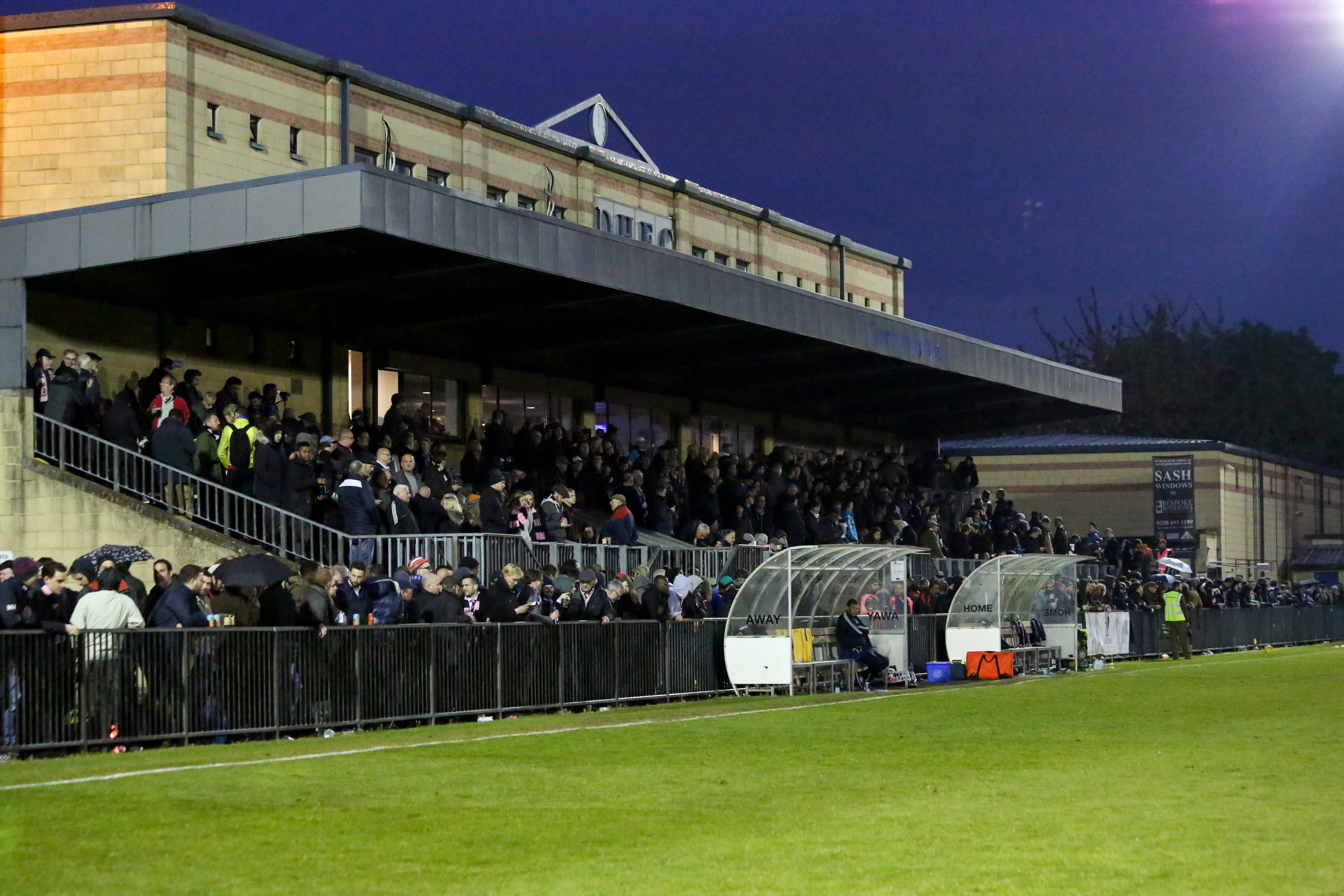
- Main stand and dugouts in April 2017
- Interactive map of Champion Hill
- Location: East Dulwich, Greater London, England
- Coordinates: 51°27′41″N 0°05′02″W
- Owner: Meadow Residential
- Operator: Dulwich Hamlet
- Capacity: 3,000 (500 seated)
- Surface: Grass
- Record attendance: 20,744

Construction
- Opened: 1912
- Renovated: 1992

Tenants
- Dulwich Hamlet (1912–present); Corinthian-Casuals (1963–1968); Fisher Athletic (2004–2009); Fisher (2009–2016); Dulwich Hamlet Ladies

Champion Hill is a football stadium in East Dulwich in the London Borough of Southwark. It is the home ground of Dulwich Hamlet.

== History ==
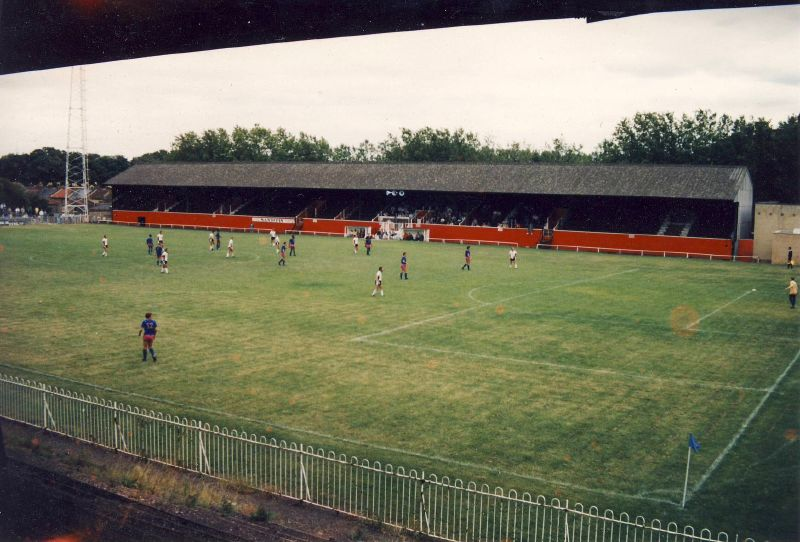
Dulwich Hamlet v Fulham at Champion Hill in 1988

Dulwich Hamlet began playing at the ground in 1912. 'The Hill' was formerly one of the largest amateur grounds in England, with attendances often reaching 20,000 and beyond. Currently, it holds the record for the highest attendance at a league match outside of the English Football League at 16,254 for a 1931 Isthmian League match between Dulwich Hamlet and Nunhead. The ground was also used for football at the 1948 Summer Olympics, staging a game between Mexico and South Korea.

When Dulwich Hamlet suffered financial problems, much of the land they owned was sold for development of a Sainsbury's supermarket. As a result, a new stadium was built on the site of the old Champion Hill stadium, and the Sainsbury's supermarket was built on what had been the training pitch before the 1980s. The new stadium was opened in 1992.

The ground was also used by Corinthian-Casuals from 1963 until 1968, Fisher Athletic from 2004 until they folded in 2009, and then by the new Fisher club between their formation in 2009 and 2016 when they moved to their own ground on Salter Road.

It was listed by Southwark London Borough Council as an asset of community value in 2013. The club's record attendance at the new ground of 3,336 was set at an FA Cup First Round game against Carlisle United on 8 November 2019.

In March 2018 Dulwich were forced to leave the ground by Meadow Residential, a property development company. They returned to the ground in December after groundsharing at Imperial Fields for several months.

== Facilities ==
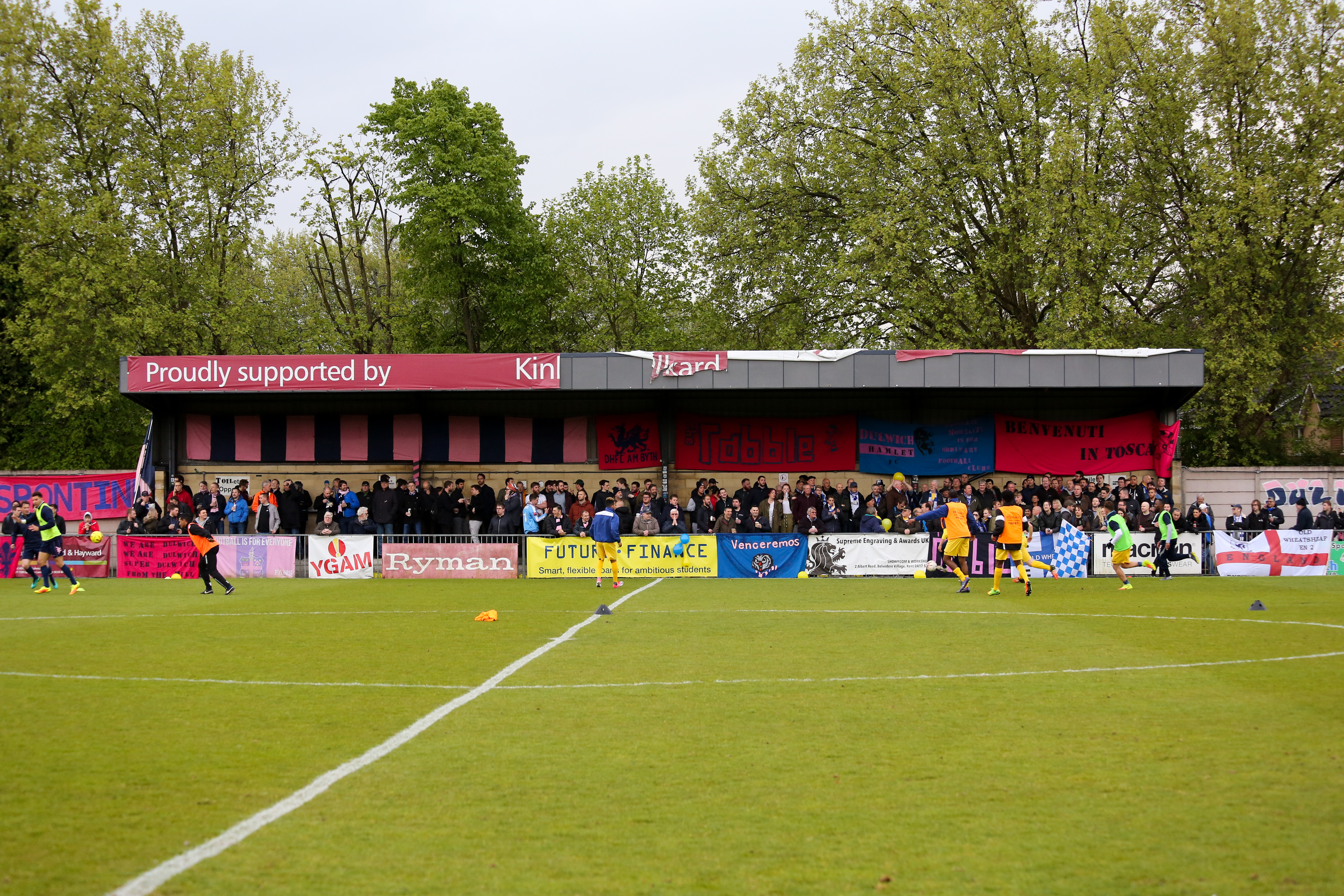
South side covered terrace in April 2017.

The stadium has the covered Tommy Jover main stand along the north side of the pitch, a smaller covered terrace on the opposite side (known as the "Toilets Opposite" stand), and uncovered terraces behind both goals.

The main stand incorporates the changing rooms, clubhouse and other ancillary facilities.

== Transport ==
The ground is close to East Dulwich and Denmark Hill stations.
