= Corinthian-Casuals F.C. =

Association football club in London, England

Coordinates: 51°22′20″N 0°17′14″W

Corinthian-Casuals
- Full name: Corinthian-Casuals Football Club
- Nicknames: Corinth, Casuals, The Amateurs, The Chocolate & Pink
- Founded: 1939
- Ground: King George's Field, Tolworth
- Capacity: 2,000 (250 seated)
- Chairman: Brian Adamson
- Manager: Liam Giles
- League: Combined Counties League Premier Division South
- 2025–26: Combined Counties League Premier Division South, 11th of 20
- Website: corinthian-casuals.com
| Home colours | Away colours |

Corinthian-Casuals Football Club is a football club based in Tolworth in the Royal Borough of Kingston upon Thames, England. Affiliated to the London Football Association, they are currently members of the Combined Counties League Premier Division South and play at King George's Field.

== History ==
The club was established in 1939 as a merger of amateur clubs Corinthian (founded in 1882) and Casuals (1883). The new club played a single match before football was suspended due to World War II. After the war the club took Casuals' place in the Isthmian League. In 1953–54 they won the Surrey Senior Cup, beating Epsom 2–0 in the final. Two seasons later they reached the final of the FA Amateur Cup; after a 1–1 draw against Bishop Auckland at Wembley Stadium, the club lost the replay at Ayresome Park 4–1. They reached the semi-finals of the competition the following season, losing 4–2 to Wycombe Wanderers. In 1965–66 the club reached the first round of the FA Cup for the first time, losing 5–1 at home to Third Division Watford.

The late 1960s and early 1970s saw Corinthian-Casuals struggling in the league, finishing bottom in 1968–69 and then for four consecutive seasons between 1970–71 and 1973–74, after which the club were relegated to Division Two, which had been created in 1973. The division was renamed Division One in 1977, and the club were relegated again (to the renamed Division Two) at the end of the 1977–78 season. In 1983–84 they reached the first round of the FA Cup for the second time, drawing 0–0 with Fourth Division Bristol City and losing the replay 4–0. At the end of the season the club were excluded from the Isthmian League after new groundsharing rules were introduced, resulting in a drop into the Premier Division of the Spartan League. Their first season in the league saw them relegated to the Senior Division, but they went on to win the division at the first attempt, the club's first ever league title, to earn an immediate return to the Premier Division.

In 1988–89 Corinthian-Casuals toured Brazil, which included a match against Corinthians, in which Sócrates played for both teams. In 1994–95 they won the Spartan League Cup. In 1996 the club switched to the Combined Counties League. After finishing as runners-up in their first season in the new league, they returned to the Isthmian League as members of Division Three in 1997. After another tour to Brazil in 2001, league reorganisation in 2002 saw them placed in Division One South. Further reorganisation saw them become members of Division One in 2004 and then Division One South again in 2006. In 2010–11 they won the Surrey Senior Cup for a second time, beating Leatherhead 2–0 in the final. The club returned to Brazil in 2015 to play Corinthians again, with the Brazilian club winning 3–0. In 2016–17 they finished fourth in Division One South, qualifying for the promotion play-offs. After beating Greenwich Borough 4–3 in the semi-finals, they lost on penalties to Dorking Wanderers in the final after a 0–0 draw.

The 2017–18 season saw Corinthian-Casuals finish fifth in the division, again reaching the play-offs. They defeated Greenwich Borough 3–0 in the semi-finals, before losing the final 4–2 on penalties to Walton Casuals after the game ended 0–0. Despite the defeat, the club were promoted to the Premier Division after results in other divisions meant that they were the play-off finalists at step 4 with the highest points per game ratio from the season. They were relegated to the South Central Division at the end of the 2022–23 season after finishing second-from-bottom of the Premier Division. The following season saw them finish bottom of the South Central Division, resulting in a second successive relegation, this time to the Premier Division South of the Combined Counties League.

== Ground ==
After their formation the club played their first match in the grounds of Lambeth Palace, but after World War II they played at Kingstonian's Richmond Road ground, which had previously been used by Casuals. However, they left in 1946 and played at numerous other grounds; the Polytechnic Ground in Chiswick (1946–1950), the Oval (1950–1963; the club played at the Vauxhall End of the ground), Dulwich Hamlet's Champion Hill (1963–1968), Tooting & Mitcham United's Sandy Lane (1968–1983), Molesey's Walton Road (1983–1984 and again from 1986 to 1988) and Wimbledon Park Athletics Stadium (1984–1986).

In 1988 the club merged with Tolworth and took over their King George's Field, marking the first time the club had owned their own ground. The ground originally had a running track around the pitch, which was later removed. Covered standing was installed behind both goals and a stand built along one side of the pitch which includes a small section of seating, with the seats coming from Plough Lane, Champion Hill and Havant & Waterlooville's Westleigh Park. The ground currently has a capacity of 2,000, of which 250 is seated.

== Honours ==
- Spartan League
  - Senior Division champions 1985–86
  - League Cup winners 1994–95
- Surrey Senior Cup
  - Winners 1953–54, 2010–11
- Victory Cup
  - Winners 1966–67
- Egri Erbstein Tournament
  - Winners 2019

== Records ==
- Highest league position: 5th in the Isthmian League, 1953–54, 1959–60
- Best FA Cup performance: First round, 1965–66, 1983–84
- Best FA Amateur Cup performance: Finalists, 1955–56
- Best FA Trophy performance: Second round, 2002–03
- Best FA Vase performance: Fifth round, 1983–84
- Most appearances: Simon Shergold, 526
- Most goals: Cliff West, 215

== See also ==
- Corinthian-Casuals F.C. players
- Corinthian-Casuals F.C. managers
