= List of Woking F.C. seasons =

Woking Football Club is an English football club based in Woking, Surrey, formed in 1889. The club plays at Kingfield Stadium and participates in the National League, the fifth tier of English football.

Woking have won the FA Trophy a joint-record 3 times. Woking are known as The Cards or The Cardinals.

== History ==
Founded in 1887, they joined the Isthmian League in 1911–12 and won the FA Amateur Cup in 1957–58. Woking were relegated twice in 1982–83 and 1984–85. However, they were promoted three times: in 1986–87, 1989–90 and 1991–92, to reach the Football Conference. Woking won the FA Trophy on three occasions throughout the 1990s and finished as runners-up in the Conference in their third and fourth season at that level but were not promoted. They remained at the highest level of non-League football until relegation in 2008–09. Woking subsequently won promotion back in 2011–12 before suffering another relegation in 2017–18. They earned immediate promotion to the National League via the play-offs in 2019.

== Seasons ==
Season	League											FA Cup	FA Amateur Cup (Pre 1974) FA Trophy (1974–Present)	Other Cups	Top scorer		Average attendance
Season	Level	Division	P	W	D	L	F	A	GD	Pts	Pos	FA Cup	FA Amateur Cup (Pre 1974) FA Trophy (1974–Present)	Other Cups	Top scorer		Average attendance
1911–12	3	Isthmian League	20	7	5	8	38	41	-3	19	7th	No data	R3	—N/a	—N/a		—N/a
1912–13	3	Isthmian League	20	7	5	8	33	40	-7	19	6th	No data	No data	—N/a	—N/a		—N/a
1913–14	3	Isthmian League	20	1	1	18	11	61	-50	3	11th	No data	No data	—N/a	—N/a		—N/a
League halted by the First World War.
1919–20	3	Isthmian League	22	6	3	13	36	42	-6	15	10th	No data	No data	—N/a	—N/a		—N/a
1920–21	4	Isthmian League	22	3	5	14	16	43	-27	11	10th	No data	No data	—N/a	—N/a		—N/a
1921–22	4	Isthmian League	26	10	6	10	39	49	-10	26	10th	No data	No data	—N/a	—N/a		—N/a
1923–24	4	Isthmian League	26	5	8	13	31	62	-31	18	12th	No data	No data	—N/a	—N/a		—N/a
1924–25	4	Isthmian League	26	5	3	18	33	67	-34	13	14th	No data	No data	—N/a	—N/a		—N/a
1925–26	4	Isthmian League	26	8	6	12	56	73	-17	22	9th	No data	No data	—N/a	—N/a		—N/a
1926–27	4	Isthmian League	26	12	6	8	68	60	+8	30	5th	R1	No data	—N/a	—N/a		—N/a
1927–28	4	Isthmian League	26	13	5	8	72	56	+16	31	4th	No data	No data	—N/a	—N/a		—N/a
1928–29	4	Isthmian League	26	8	3	13	39	65	-26	19	13th	R1	No data	—N/a	—N/a		—N/a
1929–30	4	Isthmian League	26	10	5	10	66	65	+1	27	5th	No data	No data	—N/a	—N/a		—N/a
1930–31	4	Isthmian League	26	9	4	13	56	63	-7	22	12th	No data	SF	—N/a	—N/a		—N/a
1931–32	4	Isthmian League	26	6	5	15	44	64	-20	17	13th	No data	No data	—N/a	—N/a		—N/a
1932–33	4	Isthmian League	26	10	4	12	53	61	-8	24	10th	No data	No data	—N/a	—N/a		—N/a
1933–34	4	Isthmian League	26	6	1	19	43	81	-38	13	14th	No data	No data	—N/a	—N/a		—N/a
1934–35	4	Isthmian League	26	9	3	14	44	68	-24	21	12th	No data	No data	—N/a	—N/a		—N/a
1935–36	4	Isthmian League	26	9	4	13	43	62	-19	22	10th	No data	No data	—N/a	—N/a		—N/a
1936–37	4	Isthmian League	26	9	4	13	53	69	-16	22	10th	No data	No data	—N/a	—N/a		—N/a
1937–38	4	Isthmian League	26	7	2	17	41	72	-31	16	13th	No data	No data	—N/a	—N/a		—N/a
1938–39	4	Isthmian League	26	9	2	15	35	56	-21	20	11th	No data	No data	—N/a	—N/a		—N/a
Football halted by the Second World War.
1945–46	4	Isthmian League	26	10	7	9	56	51	+5	27	6th	QR2	No data	—N/a	—N/a		—N/a
1946–47	4	Isthmian League	26	7	7	12	34	62	-28	21	11th	QR1	No data	—N/a	—N/a		—N/a
1947–48	4	Isthmian League	26	10	3	13	63	55	+8	23	8th	QR1	No data	—N/a	—N/a		—N/a
1948–49	4	Isthmian League	26	14	1	11	64	59	+5	29	7th	QR2	No data	—N/a	—N/a		—N/a
1949–50	4	Isthmian League	26	10	6	10	60	71	-9	26	7th	QR1	No data	—N/a	—N/a		—N/a
1950–51	4	Isthmian League	26	11	6	9	65	55	+10	28	6th	EPRE	No data	—N/a	—N/a		—N/a
1951–52	4	Isthmian League	26	11	5	10	60	71	-9	27	7th	QR2	No data	—N/a	—N/a		—N/a
1952–53	4	Isthmian League	28	10	4	14	57	72	-15	24	12th	QR1	No data	—N/a	—N/a		—N/a
1953–54	4	Isthmian League	28	13	4	11	54	58	-4	30	6th	PRE	No data	—N/a	—N/a		—N/a
1954–55	4	Isthmian League	28	12	3	13	75	79	-4	27	7th	PRE	No data	—N/a	—N/a		—N/a
1955–56	4	Isthmian League	28	14	3	11	62	60	+2	31	4th	PRE	No data	—N/a	—N/a		—N/a
1956–57	6	Isthmian League	30	20	1	9	104	47	+57	41	2nd	QR1	No data	—N/a	—N/a		—N/a
1957–58	4	Isthmian League	30	12	7	11	70	58	+12	31	9th	QR1	W	—N/a	—N/a		—N/a
1958–59	5	Isthmian League	30	12	6	12	66	66	=0	30	8th	R1	No data	—N/a	—N/a		—N/a
1959–60	5	Isthmian League	30	10	6	14	54	61	-7	26	11th	QR3	No data	—N/a	—N/a		—N/a
1960–61	5	Isthmian League	30	10	6	14	58	71	-13	26	13th	QR1	No data	—N/a	—N/a		—N/a
1961–62	5	Isthmian League	30	9	9	12	51	60	-9	27	10th	QR2	R3	—N/a	—N/a		—N/a
1962–63	5	Isthmian League	30	8	6	16	42	66	-24	22	13th	QR2	No data	—N/a	—N/a		—N/a
1963–64	5	Isthmian League	38	10	9	19	48	88	-40	29	17th	QR2	No data	—N/a	—N/a		—N/a
1964–65	5	Isthmian League	38	7	4	27	45	113	-68	18	20th	QR1	R1	—N/a	—N/a		—N/a
1965–66	5	Isthmian League	38	12	10	16	60	83	-23	34	12th	QR3	No data	—N/a	—N/a		—N/a
1966–67	5	Isthmian League	38	13	10	15	65	71	-6	36	11th	QR1	No data	—N/a	—N/a		—N/a
1967–68	5	Isthmian League	38	8	8	22	50	90	-40	24	17th	QR1	No data	—N/a	—N/a		—N/a
1968–69	5	Isthmian League	38	8	7	23	45	77	-32	23	16th	R1	No data	—N/a	—N/a		—N/a
1969–70	5	Isthmian League	38	10	7	21	46	69	-23	27	15th	QR1	No data	—N/a	—N/a		—N/a
1970–71	5	Isthmian League	38	18	6	14	57	50	+7	42	9th	QR2	No data	—N/a	—N/a		—N/a
1971–72	5	Isthmian League	40	11	10	19	52	58	-6	32	14th	QR1	R3	—N/a	—N/a		—N/a
1972–73	5	Isthmian League	42	18	8	16	61	56	+5	44	15th	QR3	No data	—N/a	—N/a		—N/a
1973–74	5	Isthmian Division 1	42	22	6	14	63	55	+8	72	7th	QR2	QF	—N/a	—N/a		—N/a
1974–75	5	Isthmian Division 1	42	12	10	20	53	73	-20	46	15th	QR2	QR3	—N/a	—N/a		—N/a
1975–76	5	Isthmian Division 1	42	14	9	19	58	62	-4	51	14th	QR1	QR3	ILC: R3	—N/a		—N/a
1976–77	5	Isthmian Division 1	42	11	12	19	47	61	-14	45	19th	R1	QR1	ILC: QF	—N/a		—N/a
1977–78	5	Isthmian Premier	42	14	11	17	62	62	=0	53	14th	PRE	R1	ILC: R2	—N/a		—N/a
1978–79	5	Isthmian Premier	42	18	14	10	79	59	+20	68	7th	R2	R1	ILC: R3	—N/a		—N/a
1979–80	6	Isthmian Premier	42	17	13	12	78	59	+19	64	9th	QR4	SF	ILC: SF	—N/a		—N/a
1980–81	6	Isthmian Premier	42	11	7	24	40	69	-29	37 (Note: Woking deducted 3 points)	22nd	QR2	R1	ILC: R3	—N/a		—N/a
1981–82	6	Isthmian Premier	42	11	13	18	57	75	-18	46	20th	QR1	R2	ILC: R1	—N/a		—N/a
1982–83	6	Isthmian Premier	42	6	6	30	30	79	-49	24	21st	PRE	R1	ILC: R2	—N/a		—N/a
1983–84	7	Isthmian Division 1	42	16	7	19	66	73	-7	55	13th	PRE	QR3	ILC: R1	—N/a		—N/a
1984–85	7	Isthmian Division 1	42	15	6	21	60	91	-31	51	19th	QR1	R1	ILC: R1	—N/a		—N/a
1985–86	8	Isthmian Division 2 S	38	23	9	6	94	45	+49	78	3rd	QR2	QR1	ILC: R1	—N/a		—N/a
1986–87	8	Isthmian Division 2 S	40	27	7	6	110	32	+78	88	1st	R1	QR1	ILC: R1	—N/a		—N/a
1987–88	7	Isthmian Division 1	42	25	7	10	91	52	+42	82	3rd	QR3	QR3	ILC: R1	—N/a		—N/a
1988–89	7	Isthmian Division 1	40	24	10	6	72	30	+42	82	3rd	R1	R3	ILC: R3	—N/a		—N/a
1989–90	7	Isthmian Division 1	42	30	8	4	102	29	+73	98	2nd	R2	R3	ILC: SF	—N/a		—N/a
1990–91	6	Isthmian Premier	42	24	10	8	84	39	+45	82	4th	R4	R1	ILC: W	—N/a		—N/a
1991–92	6	Isthmian Premier	42	30	7	5	96	25	+71	97	1st	R3	R2	ILC: QF	—N/a		—N/a
1992–93	5	Football Conference	42	17	8	17	58	62	-4	59	8th	R2	R1	CLC: R1	—N/a		—N/a
1993–94	5	Football Conference	42	18	13	11	58	58	=0	67	3rd	R2	W	CLC: R2	Clive Walker	16	—N/a
1994–95	5	Football Conference	42	21	12	9	76	54	+22	75	2nd	R2	W	CLC: ?	Clive Walker	19	—N/a
1995–96	5	Football Conference	42	25	8	9	83	54	+29	83	2nd	R3	R1	CLC: ?	Clive Walker	18	—N/a
1996–97	5	Football Conference	42	18	10	14	71	63	+8	64	5th	R3	W	CLC: R2	Justin Jackson	17	—N/a
1997–98	5	Football Conference	42	22	8	12	72	46	+26	74	3rd	R1	R1	CLC: F	Darran Hay	20	—N/a
1998–99	5	Football Conference	42	18	9	15	51	45	+6	63	9th	R1	R5	CLC: QF	Darran Hay	13	—N/a
1999–2000	5	Football Conference	42	13	13	16	45	53	-8	52	14th	QR4	R5	CLC: ?	Nassim Akrour	12	—N/a
2000–01	5	Football Conference	42	13	15	14	52	57	-5	54	14th	R1	R3	CLC: ?	Charlie Griffin	13	—N/a
2001–02	5	Football Conference	42	13	9	20	59	70	-11	48	19th	QR4	R5	—N/a	Warren Patmore	11	—N/a
2002–03	5	Football Conference	42	11	14	17	52	81	-29	47	19th	QR4	R4	—N/a	Warren Patmore	14	—N/a
2003–04	5	Football Conference	42	15	16	11	65	52	+13	61	9th	R2	R3	—N/a	No data	No data	—N/a
2004–05	5	Conference National	42	18	14	10	58	45	+13	68	8th	R1	QF	CLC: W	Justin Richards	14	—N/a
2005–06	5	Conference National	42	14	14	14	58	47	+11	56	11th	R2	F	—N/a	Justin Richards	21	—N/a
2006–07	5	Conference National	46	15	12	19	56	61	-5	57	15th	R1	R1	—N/a	Craig McAllister	15	—N/a
2007–08	5	Conference Premier	46	12	17	17	53	61	-8	53	17th	QR4	R2	CLC: SF	Giuseppe Sole	14	—N/a
2008–09	5	Conference Premier	46	10	14	22	37	60	-23	44	21st	QR4	R1	CLC: QF	Wilfried Domoraud	8	1,642
2009–10	6	Conference South	42	21	9	12	57	44	+13	72	5th (Note: Lost in Playoff final)	R1	R2	—N/a	Giuseppe Sole	14	1,335
2010–11	6	Conference South	42	22	10	10	63	42	+21	76	5th (Note: Lost in Playoff semifinal)	R1	R3	—N/a	Elvis Hammond	12	1,167
2011–12	6	Conference South	42	30	7	5	92	41	+51	97	1st	QR3	QR3	—N/a	Giuseppe Sole	19	1,834
2012–13	5	Conference Premier	46	18	8	20	73	81	-8	62	12th	QR4	R2	—N/a	Bradley Bubb	18	1,600
2013–14	5	Conference Premier	46	20	8	18	66	69	−3	68	9th	QR4	R2	—N/a	Scott Rendell	17	1,601
2014–15	5	Conference Premier	46	21	13	12	77	52	+25	76	7th	R1	R3	—N/a	Scott Rendell	24	1,911
2015–16	5	National League	46	17	10	19	71	68	+3	61	12th	QR4	QF	—N/a	John Goddard	17	1,634
2016–17	5	National League	46	14	11	21	66	80	−14	53	18th	R2	R1	—N/a	Gozie Ugwu	17	1,429
2017–18	5	National League	46	13	9	24	56	76	−20	48	21st	R2	R1	—N/a	Charlie Carter	12	1,911
2018–19	6	National League South	42	23	9	10	76	49	+27	78	2nd (Note: Won in Playoff final)	R3	R1	—N/a	Max Kretzschmar	14	1,882
2019–20	5	National League	38	15	10	13	50	55	-5	55	10th (Note: Season finished early due to Covid-19 Pandemic)	QR4	R1	—N/a	Jake Hyde	15	2,134
2020–21	5	National League	42	8	9	25	42	69	-27	33	20th	R1	SF	—N/a	Kane Ferdinand; Max Kretzschmar	6	799 (Note: Fans were only permitted during two fixtures this season due to COVID-19 pandemic.)
2021–22	5	National League	44	16	5	23	59	61	-2	53	15th	QR4	R1	—N/a	Tahvon Campbell; Inih Effiong; Max Kretzschmar	13	2,703
2022–23	5	National League	46	24	10	12	71	48	+23	82	4th (Note: Lost in Playoff quarter-final)	R1	R1	—N/a	Rhys Browne	13	2,734
2023–24	5	National League	46	15	10	21	49	55	-6	55	17th	R1	R3	—N/a	Ricky Korboa	7	2,723
2024–25	5	National League	46	13	19	14	52	59	-7	58	15th	R1	SF	NLC: GS	Harry Beautyman	10	2,322
2025–26	5	National League	46	16	15	15	69	54	+15	63	10th	QR4	QF	NLC: GS	Olly Sanderson	17	2,701

Champions	Runners-up	Promoted	Relegated
