= List of Wycombe Wanderers F.C. seasons =

Wycombe Wanderers Football Club is an English association football club based in the town of High Wycombe, Buckinghamshire. Founded in 1887 as an amateur club, the team entered the FA Amateur Cup for the first time in 1894–95, made their FA Cup debut the following season, and joined the Southern League in 1896. They played in the Second Division of the Southern League until 1908, when after twice finishing bottom of that league, the club declined the invitation to continue membership and opted for the amateur Great Western Suburban League instead. When competitive football resumed after the First World War they spent two seasons in the Spartan League – winning the title on each occasion – before being accepted into the Isthmian League, in which they spent the remainder of the inter-war period. They finished third in 1930–31, but the highlight of the season was victory in the Amateur Cup. In the final, held at Arsenal's Highbury Stadium, Wycombe beat Hayes 1–0 to win the trophy for the first and only time. The goal was scored by Alf Britnell after 81 minutes. Between 1953–54 and 1959–60, Wycombe never finished outside the top four in the Isthmian League. They won the championship for the first time in 1955–56, retained the title in 1956–57, and reached the Amateur Cup Final that same year. This time, they lost 3–1 in front of a crowd of 90,000 at Wembley Stadium as Bishop Auckland won their third consecutive Amateur Cup.

At the start of the 1970s, Wycombe won the Isthmian League four times in five seasons. The fourth of those titles, in 1974–75, was in the first season after the distinction between amateur and professional was abolished, so Wycombe made their first appearance in the FA Trophy, which until then had been open to non-League clubs that registered professional players. They also reached the third round of the FA Cup for the first time; they held First Division leaders Middlesbrough to a goalless draw at Loakes Park, and only lost the replay to a last-minute goal. Courtesy of the Isthmian League win, they were invited to enter the Anglo-Italian Semi-Professional Trophy, a match played on a home-and-away basis against Monza, winners of the Coppa Italia Semiprofessionisti. Wycombe lost the away leg 1–0 but won 2–0 at home to take the trophy.

Wycombe's continued success in the Isthmian League brought potential promotion to the Alliance Premier League, the level immediately below the Football League. The club twice refused the opportunity before accepting for the 1985–86 season. They finished 20th, and were relegated on goal difference, but thanks to their eighth Isthmian League title, made an immediate return to the higher level, which had been renamed the Football Conference. Under the management of Martin O'Neill, Wycombe won the FA Trophy for the first time in 1991, beating Kidderminster Harriers at Wembley in front of a then record attendance for the competition of 34,842. They followed up with runners-up spot in the 1991–92 season and went one better in 1992–93, adding a second FA Trophy to the Conference title and consequent promotion to the Football League.

They marked their debut season in the Football League with promotion to the Second Division via the play-offs; after a fourth-place finish, they beat Carlisle United in the semi-final and came from 2–1 down to beat Preston North End 4–2 in the final. After eight seasons in the third tier, they were relegated, and thereafter moved regularly between the two lower tiers. In 2013–14, they avoided a return to the Conference only on goal difference, but bounced back to reach the play-off final the following year, only to lose to Southend United in a penalty shoot-out. In 2017–18, they were promoted back to League One and two years later they reached the second tier of English football for the first time in their history after beating Oxford United 2–1 in the play-off final. Although they lost their first seven matches of the 2020–21 EFL Championship, and were 12 points adrift in mid-February, they recovered to finish 22nd and their relegation was only confirmed on the final day of the season. They reached the play-off final the following year but were beaten 2–0 by Sunderland.

Wycombe reached the FA Cup semi-final for the first time in 2000–01; they had not previously passed the third round. They held Liverpool, holders of the 2000–01 League Cup and still in that season's UEFA Cup, for 78 minutes before goals from Emile Heskey and Robbie Fowler secured a place in the final for the Premier League club; Keith Ryan made the score 2–1. In the Football League Cup, Wycombe eliminated two Premier League clubs, Fulham and Charlton Athletic, on their way to the 2006–07 semi-final; they drew with Chelsea in the home leg, but lost 4–0 at Stamford Bridge. Wycombe reached the final of the EFL Trophy for the first time in 2024, but lost 2–1 to Peterborough United.

Since their admission to the Football League, Wycombe have spent 13 seasons in the fourth tier of the English football league system, 19 in the third tier, and 1 in the second. The table details the team's achievements and the top goalscorer in senior first-team competitions from their debut season in the FA Amateur Cup in 1894–95 to the end of the most recently completed season.

== Key ==
Key to league record:

- Pld – Matches played
- W – Matches won
- D – Matches drawn
- L – Matches lost
- GF – Goals for
- GA – Goals against
- Pts – Points
- Pos – Final position

Key to colours and symbols:
| Symbol | Meaning |
|---|---|
| 1st or W | Winners |
| 2nd or F | Runners-up |
| ↑ | Promoted |
| ↓ | Relegated |
| ♦ | Top league scorer in Wycombe's division |

Key to divisions:

- South 2 – Southern League Second Division
- South 2L – Southern League Second Division London Section
- B&B – Berks and Bucks League
- BCC – Bucks and Contiguous Counties League
- GWSL – Great Western Suburban League
- Spartan – Spartan League
- Isthmian – Isthmian League
- Isth 1 – Isthmian League Division One
- Isth P – Isthmian League Premier Division
- APL – Alliance Premier League
- Conf – Football Conference
- Div 3 – Football League Third Division
- Div 4 – Football League Fourth Division
- League 1 – Football League One, EFL League One
- League 2 – Football League Two, EFL League Two
- Champ – EFL Championship

Key to rounds:

- ExPre – Extra preliminary round
- Prelim – Preliminary round
- QR1 – First qualifying round
- QR2 – Second qualifying round, etc.
- Inter – Intermediate round (between qualifying rounds and rounds proper)
- R1 – First round
- R2 – Second round, etc.
- QF – Quarter-final
- 3rd – Third place
- SF – Semi-final
- F – Final
- W – Winners
- (S) – Southern section of regionalised stage
- Scr – Scratched

Details of abandoned competitions – the 1939–40 FA Cup and Isthmian League – are shown in italics and appropriately footnoted.

== Seasons ==
List of seasons, including league division and statistics, cup results, and top scorers
| Season | League | | | | | | | | | FA Cup (Note: Beginning with the 1925–26 season, the FA Cup was structured so that the third round proper contained 64 teams. Prior to that date, the structure had varied, so rounds are not directly comparable to the round of the same name after 1925. For example, in 1895–96, when Wycombe first entered the competition, there were only three rounds proper before the semifinal, as compared with the current six.) | League Cup (Note: The League Cup competition started in the 1960–61 season.) | Other | | Top league scorer(s) | |
| Season | Division (Note: Divisions are sorted according to their level within the English football league system at the time.) | Pld | W | D | L | GF | GA | Pts | Pos (Note: In seasons when the club played in more than one league, the column is sorted on the Southern League position.) | FA Cup | League Cup | Competition | Result | Player(s) | Goals |
|---|---|---|---|---|---|---|---|---|---|---|---|---|---|---|---|
| 1894–95 | — | — | — | — | — | — | — | — | — | — | — | FA Amateur Cup; Berks & Bucks Sen. Cup | QR2; R2 | — | — |
| 1895–96 | — | — | — | — | — | — | — | — | — | QR1 | — | FA Amateur Cup; Berks & Bucks Sen. Cup | R1; R1 | — | — |
| 1896–97 | South 2 | 24 | 10 | 6 | 8 | 37 | 54 | 26 | 5th | QR1 | — | FA Amateur Cup; Berks & Bucks Sen. Cup | R1; F | Fred Abbott | 9 |
| 1897–98 | South 2 | 22 | 7 | 2 | 13 | 37 | 55 | 16 | 10th | QR1 | — | FA Amateur Cup; Berks & Bucks Sen. Cup | QF; R2 | Fred Abbott | 10 |
| 1898–99 | South 2L; BCC | 22; 10 | 10; 3 | 2; 1 | 10; 6 | 55; 21 | 57; 36 | 22; 7 | 5th; n/k | Prelim | — | FA Amateur Cup; Berks & Bucks Sen. Cup | R1; R3 | Jim Aldridge | 12 |
| 1899–1900 | South 2 | 20 | 8 | 3 | 9 | 35 | 50 | 19 | 8th | QR3 | — | FA Amateur Cup; Berks & Bucks Sen. Cup | R1; F (Note: Because of controversy surrounding the 1900 final, Wycombe refused to enter the 1900–01 competition. They won in 1901–02, beating Slough 3–0 in the final.) | William Buchanan | 11 |
| 1900–01 | South 2 | 16 | 4 | 1 | 11 | 23 | 68 | 9 | 8th | Scr (Note: Wycombe were drawn to play Richmond Association at home in the third qualifying round, but as part of a punishment for poor behaviour both on and off the field at the opening match of the Southern League season, their ground was closed for two weeks and the team could not play within a ten-mile radius. They scratched from the competition rather than play at Richmond.) | — | FA Amateur Cup | R2 | Fred Rouse | 12 |
| 1901–02 | South 2; B&B | 16; 6 | 7; 1 | 3; 1 | 6; 4 | 36; 3 | 30; 13 | 17; 3 | 4th; 4th | QR4 | — | FA Amateur Cup; Berks & Bucks Sen. Cup | QR4; W | William Buchanan | 9 |
| 1902–03 | South 2; B&B | 10; 10 | 3; 3 | 3; 3 | 4; 4 | 13; 23 | 19; 28 | 9; 9 | 4th; 5th | QR2 | — | FA Amateur Cup; Berks & Bucks Sen. Cup | QR2; SF | William Brion | 5 |
| 1903–04 | South 2 | 20 | 5 | 5 | 10 | 29 | 64 | 15 | 9th | QR5 | — | FA Amateur Cup; Berks & Bucks Sen. Cup | QR3; R1 | Fred Pheby | 11 |
| 1904–05 | South 2 | 22 | 6 | 2 | 14 | 37 | 70 | 14 | 11th | QR3 | — | FA Amateur Cup; Berks & Bucks Sen. Cup | QR3; SF | Frank Langley | 11 |
| 1905–06 | South 2 | 24 | 5 | 3 | 16 | 36 | 83 | 13 | 13th | Inter | — | FA Amateur Cup; Berks & Bucks Sen. Cup | R1; SF | Benny Finch | 7 |
| 1906–07 | South 2 | 22 | 4 | 6 | 12 | 28 | 68 | 14 | 12th | QR3 | — | FA Amateur Cup; Berks & Bucks Sen. Cup | R1; R1 | William Brion; Ralph Roberts; Joseph Lyford | 5 |
| 1907–08 | South 2 | 18 | 1 | 1 | 16 | 16 | 72 | 3 | 10th (Note: Club opted to refuse invitation to rejoin Southern League, and instead joined Great Western Suburban League.) | QR1 | — | FA Amateur Cup; Berks & Bucks Sen. Cup | R2; R2 | William Brion | 7 |
| 1908–09 | GWSL | 24 | 14 | 6 | 4 | 46 | 30 | 34 | 3rd | QR2 | — | FA Amateur Cup; Berks & Bucks Sen. Cup | R3; W | Not known | — |
| 1909–10 | GWSL | 22 | 14 | 1 | 7 | 65 | 33 | 29 | 3rd | QR5 | — | FA Amateur Cup; Berks & Bucks Sen. Cup | QF; W | Not known | — |
| 1910–11 | GWSL | 24 | 11 | 3 | 10 | 62 | 43 | 25 | 5th | QR2 | — | FA Amateur Cup; Berks & Bucks Sen. Cup | QF; R2 | Not known | — |
| 1911–12 | GWSL | 20 | 11 | 3 | 6 | 56 | 39 | 25 | 3rd | QR2 | — | FA Amateur Cup; Berks & Bucks Sen. Cup | R1; SF | Not known | — |
| 1912–13 | GWSL | 20 | 7 | 2 | 11 | 44 | 43 | 16 | 7th | QR2 | — | FA Amateur Cup; Berks & Bucks Sen. Cup | QR3; W | Not known | — |
| 1913–14 | GWSL | 18 | 9 | 3 | 6 | 49 | 34 | 21 | 4th | QR3 | — | FA Amateur Cup; Berks & Bucks Sen. Cup | QR1; R1 | Not known | — |
| 1914–15 (Note: Wycombe had been elected to the Spartan League ahead of the 1914–15 season, but withdrew from that league when war broke out. They initially retained membership of the Great Western Suburban League, but in mid-September, confirmed their withdrawal from all competitive football.) | — | — | — | — | — | — | — | — | — | Scr | — | FA Amateur Cup | Scr | — | — |
| 1915–19 | Competitive league and FA Cup football was suspended until after the First World War. | | | | | | | | | | | | | | |
| 1919–20 | Spartan | 20 | 18 | 1 | 1 | 114 | 24 | 37 | 1st | QR3 | — | FA Amateur Cup; Berks & Bucks Sen. Cup | R1; R1 | Not known | — |
| 1920–21 | Spartan | 22 | 19 | 2 | 1 | 108 | 29 | 40 | 1st | QR5 | — | FA Amateur Cup; Berks & Bucks Sen. Cup | QF; W | Not known | — |
| 1921–22 | Isthmian | 26 | 12 | 2 | 12 | 61 | 64 | 26 | 8th | QR1 | — | FA Amateur Cup; Berks & Bucks Sen. Cup | R2; F | Not known | — |
| 1922–23 | Isthmian | 26 | 11 | 4 | 11 | 61 | 61 | 26 | 7th | QR2 | — | FA Amateur Cup; Berks & Bucks Sen. Cup | R1; W | Not known | — |
| 1923–24 | Isthmian | 26 | 11 | 4 | 11 | 61 | 61 | 26 | 7th | QR2 | — | FA Amateur Cup; Berks & Bucks Sen. Cup | QF; R2 | Not known | — |
| 1924–25 | Isthmian | 26 | 11 | 2 | 13 | 58 | 61 | 24 | 8th | QR2 | — | FA Amateur Cup; Berks & Bucks Sen. Cup | R1; W | Not known | — |
| 1925–26 | Isthmian | 26 | 14 | 3 | 9 | 97 | 83 | 31 | 4th | Prelim | — | FA Amateur Cup; Berks & Bucks Sen. Cup | R2; R2 | Not known | — |
| 1926–27 | Isthmian | 26 | 10 | 2 | 14 | 59 | 86 | 22 | 10th | QR1 | — | FA Amateur Cup; Berks & Bucks Sen. Cup | QF; R2 | Not known | — |
| 1927–28 | Isthmian | 26 | 9 | 5 | 12 | 60 | 69 | 23 | 11th | QR1 | — | FA Amateur Cup; Berks & Bucks Sen. Cup | R2; F | Not known | — |
| 1928–29 | Isthmian | 26 | 10 | 3 | 13 | 58 | 60 | 23 | 10th | QR1 | — | FA Amateur Cup; Berks & Bucks Sen. Cup | R2; SF | Not known | — |
| 1929–30 | Isthmian | 26 | 10 | 4 | 12 | 49 | 52 | 24 | 7th | Prelim | — | FA Amateur Cup; Berks & Bucks Sen. Cup | R1; R2 | Not known | — |
| 1930–31 | Isthmian | 26 | 12 | 6 | 8 | 67 | 45 | 30 | 3rd | Prelim | — | FA Amateur Cup; Berks & Bucks Sen. Cup | W (Note: Beat Hayes 1–0 at Arsenal's Highbury Stadium to win the Amateur Cup for the first and only time. The goal was scored by Alf Britnell after 81 minutes.); SF | Not known | — |
| 1931–32 | Isthmian | 26 | 14 | 5 | 7 | 72 | 50 | 33 | 4th | QR4 | — | FA Amateur Cup; Berks & Bucks Sen. Cup | R3; F | Not known | — |
| 1932–33 | Isthmian | 26 | 10 | 4 | 12 | 47 | 56 | 24 | 11th | R1 | — | FA Amateur Cup; Berks & Bucks Sen. Cup | R1; W | Not known | — |
| 1933–34 | Isthmian | 26 | 9 | 2 | 15 | 57 | 60 | 20 | 10th | QR1 | — | FA Amateur Cup; Berks & Bucks Sen. Cup | R1; F | Not known | — |
| 1934–35 | Isthmian | 26 | 7 | 6 | 13 | 51 | 69 | 20 | 13th | Prelim | — | FA Amateur Cup; Berks & Bucks Sen. Cup | R2; W | Not known | — |
| 1935–36 | Isthmian | 26 | 13 | 2 | 11 | 60 | 68 | 28 | 6th | QR2 | — | FA Amateur Cup; Berks & Bucks Sen. Cup | R2; R2 | Not known | — |
| 1936–37 | Isthmian | 26 | 10 | 5 | 11 | 55 | 52 | 25 | 6th | QR3 | — | FA Amateur Cup; Berks & Bucks Sen. Cup | R3; F | Not known | — |
| 1937–38 | Isthmian | 26 | 12 | 5 | 9 | 69 | 55 | 29 | 5th | Prelim | — | FA Amateur Cup; Berks & Bucks Sen. Cup | R2; F | Not known | — |
| 1938–39 | Isthmian | 26 | 10 | 6 | 10 | 62 | 62 | 26 | 9th | ExPre | — | FA Amateur Cup; Berks & Bucks Sen. Cup | R1; R2 | Not known | — |
| 1939–40 (Note: When the Second World War began, the Isthmian League season was abandoned with one match played.) | Isthmian | 1 | 1 | 0 | 0 | 4 | 0 | 2 | — | Prelim (Note: In 1939–40, Wycombe beat Hounslow 3–0 in the extra preliminary round, but the competition was abandoned before any further rounds were played.) | — | — | — | Tommy Andrews; Alf Britnell; J McCullven; Cyril Townsend | 1 |
| 1939–45 | Competitive league and FA Cup was suspended until after the Second World War. | | | | | | | | | | | | | | |
| 1945–46 | Isthmian | 26 | 9 | 3 | 14 | 80 | 88 | 21 | 9th | Prelim | — | FA Amateur Cup; Berks & Bucks Sen. Cup | R2; SF | Not known | — |
| 1946–47 | Isthmian | 26 | 9 | 8 | 9 | 63 | 62 | 26 | 7th | QR1 | — | FA Amateur Cup; Berks & Bucks Sen. Cup | R1; W | Not known | — |
| 1947–48 | Isthmian | 26 | 7 | 5 | 14 | 51 | 65 | 19 | 11th | QR2 | — | FA Amateur Cup; Berks & Bucks Sen. Cup | QF; F | Not known | — |
| 1948–49 | Isthmian | 26 | 11 | 2 | 13 | 49 | 61 | 24 | 11th | QR1 | — | FA Amateur Cup; Berks & Bucks Sen. Cup | R1; W | Not known | — |
| 1949–50 | Isthmian | 26 | 9 | 7 | 10 | 51 | 52 | 25 | 8th | QR1 | — | FA Amateur Cup; Berks & Bucks Sen. Cup | SF; W | Not known | — |
| 1950–51 | Isthmian | 26 | 8 | 3 | 15 | 46 | 64 | 19 | 11th | QR4 | — | FA Amateur Cup; Berks & Bucks Sen. Cup | R1; SF | Not known | — |
| 1951–52 | Isthmian | 26 | 12 | 5 | 9 | 64 | 59 | 29 | 6th | QR4 | — | FA Amateur Cup; Berks & Bucks Sen. Cup | QF; R2 | Not known | — |
| 1952–53 | Isthmian | 28 | 14 | 2 | 12 | 54 | 62 | 30 | 8th | QR3 | — | FA Amateur Cup; Berks & Bucks Sen. Cup | R3; SF | Not known | — |
| 1953–54 | Isthmian | 28 | 15 | 3 | 10 | 65 | 44 | 33 | 3rd | QR1 | — | FA Amateur Cup; Berks & Bucks Sen. Cup | R3; W | Not known | — |
| 1954–55 | Isthmian | 28 | 16 | 3 | 9 | 68 | 43 | 35 | 4th | QR2 | — | FA Amateur Cup; Berks & Bucks Sen. Cup | SF; F | Not known | — |
| 1955–56 | Isthmian | 28 | 19 | 5 | 4 | 82 | 36 | 43 | 1st | R1 | — | FA Amateur Cup; Berks & Bucks Sen. Cup | R3; F | Not known | — |
| 1956–57 | Isthmian | 30 | 18 | 6 | 6 | 86 | 53 | 42 | 1st | QR4 | — | FA Amateur Cup; Berks & Bucks Sen. Cup | F; R2 | Not known | — |
| 1957–58 | Isthmian | 30 | 19 | 4 | 7 | 78 | 42 | 42 | 2nd | QR1 | — | FA Amateur Cup; Berks & Bucks Sen. Cup | R3; W | Not known | — |
| 1958–59 | Isthmian | 30 | 18 | 4 | 8 | 93 | 50 | 40 | 3rd | R1 | — | FA Amateur Cup; Berks & Bucks Sen. Cup | R3; SF | Not known | — |
| 1959–60 | Isthmian | 30 | 19 | 3 | 8 | 84 | 46 | 41 | 2nd | R2 | — | FA Amateur Cup; Berks & Bucks Sen. Cup | R1; W | Not known | — |
| 1960–61 | Isthmian | 30 | 12 | 5 | 13 | 63 | 61 | 29 | 8th | R1 | — | FA Amateur Cup; Berks & Bucks Sen. Cup | R1; SF | Not known | — |
| 1961–62 | Isthmian | 30 | 12 | 7 | 11 | 57 | 51 | 31 | 7th | R1 | — | FA Amateur Cup; Berks & Bucks Sen. Cup | R3; F | Not known | — |
| 1962–63 | Isthmian | 30 | 10 | 10 | 10 | 56 | 61 | 30 | 9th | R2 | — | FA Amateur Cup; Berks & Bucks Sen. Cup | R3; SF | Not known | — |
| 1963–64 | Isthmian | 38 | 13 | 6 | 19 | 74 | 80 | 32 | 13th | QR4 | — | FA Amateur Cup; Berks & Bucks Sen. Cup | R3; W | Not known | — |
| 1964–65 | Isthmian | 38 | 13 | 7 | 18 | 70 | 85 | 33 | 13th | QR4 | — | FA Amateur Cup; Berks & Bucks Sen. Cup | R1; SF | Not known | — |
| 1965–66 | Isthmian | 38 | 25 | 6 | 7 | 100 | 65 | 56 | 4th | R1 | — | FA Amateur Cup; Berks & Bucks Sen. Cup | QF; SF | Not known | — |
| 1966–67 | Isthmian | 38 | 23 | 8 | 7 | 92 | 54 | 54 | 3rd | R1 | — | FA Amateur Cup; Berks & Bucks Sen. Cup | R1; F | Not known | — |
| 1967–68 | Isthmian | 38 | 13 | 5 | 20 | 73 | 85 | 31 | 14th | QR4 | — | FA Amateur Cup; Berks & Bucks Sen. Cup | R1; W | Not known | — |
| 1968–69 | Isthmian | 38 | 23 | 6 | 9 | 70 | 37 | 52 | 4th | R1 | — | FA Amateur Cup; Berks & Bucks Sen. Cup | R1; R3 | Not known | — |
| 1969–70 | Isthmian | 38 | 25 | 11 | 2 | 85 | 24 | 61 | 2nd | QR4 | — | FA Amateur Cup; Berks & Bucks Sen. Cup | QF; SF | Not known | — |
| 1970–71 | Isthmian | 38 | 28 | 6 | 4 | 93 | 32 | 62 | 1st | R1 | — | FA Amateur Cup; Berks & Bucks Sen. Cup | QF; F | Not known | — |
| 1971–72 | Isthmian | 40 | 31 | 3 | 6 | 102 | 20 | 65 | 1st | QR1 | — | FA Amateur Cup; Berks & Bucks Sen. Cup | SF; F | Not known | — |
| 1972–73 | Isthmian | 42 | 25 | 6 | 11 | 66 | 32 | 56 | 4th | QR3 | — | FA Amateur Cup; Berks & Bucks Sen. Cup | R1; W | Not known | — |
| 1973–74 | Isth 1 | 42 | 27 | 9 | 6 | 96 | 34 | 90 (Note: The 1973–74 season saw the introduction of three points for a win instead of two in the Isthmian League.) | 1st | R2 | — | FA Amateur Cup; Berks & Bucks Sen. Cup | R3; W | Not known | — |
| 1974–75 | Isth 1 | 42 | 28 | 11 | 3 | 93 | 30 | 95 | 1st | R3 | — | FA Trophy (Note: The Football Association abolished the distinction between amateur and professional players in 1974, thus effectively abolishing the Amateur Cup. The stronger amateur clubs, which included Wycombe, entered the FA Trophy, which had existed since 1969 as a competition for non-league clubs who registered professional players, and the others entered a new competition, the FA Vase.); Berks & Bucks Sen. Cup | QR3; W | Not known | — |
| 1975–76 | Isth 1 | 42 | 24 | 10 | 8 | 71 | 41 | 82 | 2nd | R2 | — | FA Trophy; Anglo-It. Semipro. Cup; Anglo-Italian Cup; Isthmian League Cup; Berks & Bucks Sen. Cup | QR3; W; 3rd(Eng); SF; Disq (Note: Wycombe had reached the final when they were disqualified from the competition for fielding an ineligible player.) | Not known | — |
| 1976–77 | Isth 1 | 42 | 25 | 8 | 9 | 71 | 34 | 83 | 2nd | R2 | — | FA Trophy; Isthmian League Cup; Berks & Bucks Sen. Cup | R2; R4; SF | Not known | — |
| 1977–78 | Isth P | 42 | 22 | 9 | 11 | 66 | 41 | 75 | 3rd | R1 | — | FA Trophy; Isthmian League Cup; Berks & Bucks Sen. Cup | R2; R3; W | Not known | — |
| 1978–79 | Isth P | 42 | 20 | 9 | 13 | 59 | 44 | 69 | 6th | R1 | — | FA Trophy; Isthmian League Cup; Berks & Bucks Sen. Cup | R3; R3; W | Not known | — |
| 1979–80 | Isth P | 42 | 17 | 13 | 12 | 72 | 53 | 64 | 10th | R1 | — | FA Trophy; Isthmian League Cup; Berks & Bucks Sen. Cup | R2; R3; R2 | Not known | — |
| 1980–81 | Isth P | 42 | 22 | 9 | 11 | 76 | 49 | 75 | 3rd | R1 | — | FA Trophy; Isthmian League Cup; Berks & Bucks Sen. Cup | R2; R1; R2 | Not known | — |
| 1981–82 | Isth P | 42 | 21 | 10 | 11 | 63 | 48 | 73 | 3rd | R2 | — | FA Trophy; Isthmian League Cup; Berks & Bucks Sen. Cup | SF; F; F | Not known | — |
| 1982–83 | Isth P | 42 | 26 | 7 | 9 | 79 | 47 | 85 | 1st | R1 | — | FA Trophy; Anglo-Italian Cup; Isthmian League Cup; Berks & Bucks Sen. Cup | R2; 3rd; F; R3 | Not known | — |
| 1983–84 | Isth P | 42 | 16 | 14 | 12 | 63 | 52 | 62 | 7th | R1 | — | FA Trophy; Isthmian League Cup; Isthmian Charity Shield; Berks & Bucks Sen. Cup | R2; F; W; R2 | Not known | — |
| 1984–85 | Isth P ↑ | 42 | 24 | 6 | 12 | 68 | 46 | 78 | 3rd | QR4 | — | FA Trophy; Isthmian League Cup; Berks & Bucks Sen. Cup | R2; W; R1 | Not known | — |
| 1985–86 | APL ↓ | 42 | 10 | 13 | 19 | 55 | 84 | 36 | 20th | R3 | — | FA Trophy; Conference League Cup; Isthmian Charity Shield; Berks & Bucks Sen. Cup | R4; R1; W; D | Mark West | 13 |
| 1986–87 | Isth P ↑ | 42 | 32 | 5 | 5 | 103 | 32 | 101 | 1st | QR4 | — | FA Trophy; Inter-League Cup; Isthmian League Cup; Berks & Bucks Sen. Cup | R1; R1; R3; W | Not known | — |
| 1987–88 | Conf | 42 | 11 | 13 | 18 | 50 | 76 | 46 | 18th | QR1 | — | FA Trophy; Inter-League Cup; Isthmian Charity Shield; Berks & Bucks Sen. Cup | R1; R1; W; R3 | Mark West | 14 |
| 1988–89 | Conf | 40 | 20 | 11 | 9 | 68 | 52 | 71 | 4th | QR4 | — | FA Trophy; Inter-League Cup; Berks & Bucks Sen. Cup | QF; R2; R3 | Mark West | 20 |
| 1989–90 | Conf | 42 | 17 | 10 | 15 | 64 | 56 | 61 | 10th | QR4 | — | FA Trophy; Conference League Cup; Berks & Bucks Sen. Cup | R1; SF; W | Mark West | 15 |
| 1990–91 | Conf | 42 | 21 | 11 | 10 | 75 | 46 | 74 | 5th | R2 | — | FA Trophy; Conference League Cup; Berks & Bucks Sen. Cup | W; SF; F | Mark West | 24 |
| 1991–92 | Conf | 42 | 30 | 4 | 8 | 84 | 35 | 94 | 2nd | R1 | — | FA Trophy; Conference League Cup; Conf. Champ. Shield; Berks & Bucks Sen. Cup | QF; W; W; W | Keith Scott | 18 |
| 1992–93 | Conf ↑ | 42 | 24 | 11 | 7 | 84 | 37 | 83 | 1st | R2 | — | FA Trophy; Conference League Cup; Conf. Champ. Shield; Berks & Bucks Sen. Cup | W; F; W; R2 | Keith Scott | 20 |
| 1993–94 | Div 3 ↑ | 42 | 19 | 13 | 10 | 67 | 53 | 70 | 4th (Note: Promoted to the Second Division via the play-offs, beating Carlisle United 4–1 on aggregate in the semi-final and coming from 2–1 down to beat Preston North End 4–2 in the final at Wembley Stadium.) | R1 | R2 | Football League Trophy; Conf. Champ. Shield | F(S); W | Keith Scott | 10 |
| 1994–95 | Div 2 | 46 | 21 | 15 | 10 | 60 | 46 | 78 | 6th | R3 | R1 | Football League Trophy | R2(S) | Simon Garner | 9 |
| 1995–96 | Div 2 | 46 | 15 | 15 | 16 | 63 | 59 | 60 | 12th | R1 | R2 | Football League Trophy | R1(S) | Miguel de Souza | 18 |
| 1996–97 | Div 2 | 46 | 15 | 10 | 21 | 51 | 56 | 55 | 18th | R3 | R2 | Football League Trophy | R1(S) | Dave Carroll; Steve McGavin | 9 |
| 1997–98 | Div 2 | 46 | 14 | 18 | 14 | 51 | 53 | 60 | 14th | R1 | R1 | Football League Trophy | R2(S) | Mark Stallard | 17 |
| 1998–99 | Div 2 | 46 | 13 | 12 | 21 | 52 | 58 | 51 | 19th | R2 | R2 | Football League Trophy | R2(S) | Sean Devine | 9 |
| 1999–2000 | Div 2 | 46 | 16 | 13 | 17 | 56 | 53 | 61 | 12th | R2 | R2 | Football League Trophy | R2(S) | Sean Devine | 23 |
| 2000–01 | Div 2 | 46 | 15 | 14 | 17 | 46 | 53 | 59 | 13th | SF (Note: Having progressed through six rounds of the competition, needing a replay in three of the six and a penalty shoot-out against Wimbledon in the third of those three, Wycombe reached the semi-final of the FA Cup for the first time in the club's history; they had not previously passed the third round. They faced Liverpool, who had already won the 2000–01 League Cup and were still in the UEFA Cup. The match remained goalless for 78 minutes, when Emile Heskey put Liverpool ahead. Robbie Fowler doubled the lead soon afterwards, and Wycombe's Keith Ryan scored what proved to be a late consolation goal.) | R2 | Football League Trophy | QF(S) | Andy Rammell | 10 |
| 2001–02 | Div 2 | 46 | 17 | 13 | 16 | 58 | 64 | 64 | 11th | R3 | R1 | Football League Trophy | R2(S) | Andy Rammell | 11 |
| 2002–03 | Div 2 | 46 | 13 | 13 | 20 | 59 | 66 | 52 | 18th | R1 | R2 | Football League Trophy | QF(S) | Craig Faulconbridge | 6 |
| 2003–04 | Div 2 ↓ | 46 | 6 | 19 | 21 | 50 | 75 | 37 | 24th | R2 | R2 | Football League Trophy | QF(S) | Nathan Tyson | 9 |
| 2004–05 | League 2 (Note: From the 2004–05 season, the Football League divisions were rebranded: Division One was renamed the Football League Championship, and Divisions Two and Three became Football League One and Football League Two respectively.) | 46 | 17 | 14 | 15 | 58 | 52 | 65 | 10th | R2 | R1 | Football League Trophy | QF(S) | Nathan Tyson | 22 |
| 2005–06 | League 2 | 46 | 18 | 17 | 11 | 72 | 56 | 71 | 6th (Note: Lost 2–1 on aggregate to Cheltenham Town in the play-off semi-final.) | R1 | R2 | Football League Trophy | QF(S) | Tommy Mooney | 17 |
| 2006–07 | League 2 | 46 | 16 | 14 | 16 | 52 | 47 | 62 | 12th | R2 | SF (Note: Having eliminated two Premier League teams, Fulham and Charlton Athletic, on their way to the League Cup semi-final, they went a goal behind to Chelsea in the first leg of the semi-final, at Adams Park, before Jermaine Easter's goal earned them a draw; Chelsea won the second leg 4–0.) | Football League Trophy | R2(S) | Jermaine Easter | 17 |
| 2007–08 | League 2 | 46 | 22 | 12 | 12 | 56 | 42 | 78 | 7th (Note: Lost 2–1 on aggregate to Stockport County in the play-off semi-final.) | R1 | R1 | Football League Trophy | R2(S) | Scott McGleish | 26 |
| 2008–09 | League 2 ↑ | 46 | 20 | 18 | 8 | 54 | 33 | 78 | 3rd | R2 | R1 | Football League Trophy | R2(S) | Matt Harrold | 9 |
| 2009–10 | League 1 ↓ | 46 | 10 | 15 | 21 | 56 | 76 | 45 | 22nd | R1 | R1 | Football League Trophy | R1(S) | Matt Harrold | 8 |
| 2010–11 | League 2 ↑ | 46 | 22 | 14 | 10 | 69 | 50 | 80 | 3rd | R3 | R1 | Football League Trophy | QF(S) | Scott Rendell | 14 |
| 2011–12 | League 1 ↓ | 46 | 11 | 10 | 25 | 65 | 88 | 43 | 21st | R1 | R2 | Football League Trophy | R2(S) | Stuart Beavon | 21 |
| 2012–13 | League 2 | 46 | 17 | 9 | 20 | 50 | 60 | 60 | 15th | R1 | R1 | Football League Trophy | QF(S) | Matt McClure | 11 |
| 2013–14 | League 2 | 46 | 12 | 14 | 20 | 46 | 54 | 50 | 22nd (Note: Avoided relegation to the Conference only on goal difference.) | R2 | R1 | Football League Trophy | QF(S) | Dean Morgan | 8 |
| 2014–15 | League 2 | 46 | 23 | 15 | 8 | 67 | 45 | 84 | 4th (Note: After beating Plymouth Argyle 5–3 on aggregate in the play-off semi-final, lost to Southend United on penalties in the final.) | R2 | R1 | Football League Trophy | R1(S) | Paul Hayes | 12 |
| 2015–16 | League 2 | 46 | 17 | 13 | 16 | 45 | 44 | 64 | 13th | R3 | R1 | Football League Trophy | R2(S) | Michael Harriman; Garry Thompson | 7 |
| 2016–17 | League 2 | 46 | 19 | 12 | 15 | 58 | 53 | 69 | 9th | R4 | R1 | EFL Trophy | SF | Adebayo Akinfenwa | 12 |
| 2017–18 | League 2 ↑ | 46 | 24 | 12 | 10 | 79 | 60 | 84 | 3rd | R3 | R1 | EFL Trophy | R1(S) | Adebayo Akinfenwa | 17 |
| 2018–19 | League 1 | 46 | 14 | 11 | 21 | 55 | 67 | 53 | 17th | R1 | R3 | EFL Trophy | R1(S) | Adebayo Akinfenwa; Joe Jacobson | 7 |
| 2019–20 | League 1 ↑ | 34 | 17 | 8 | 9 | 45 | 40 | 59 | 3rd (Note: The 2019–20 football season was disrupted by the effects of the COVID-19 pandemic. The EFL was suspended in March 2020 and in June, the League One clubs voted to end the regular season programme early. Teams had not all played the same number of matches, so it was agreed to construct final league tables on a points-per-game basis. Wycombe Wanderers' 76.35 points per game placed them 3rd, above three teams with more points and a better goal difference but who had played a game more. They were promoted to the Championship via the play-offs, beating Fleetwood Town 6–3 on aggregate in the semi-final and beating Oxford United 2–1 in the final at Wembley.) | R1 | R1 | EFL Trophy | R1(S) | Adebayo Akinfenwa | 10 |
| 2020–21 | Champ ↓ | 46 | 11 | 10 | 25 | 39 | 69 | 43 | 22nd | R4 | R1 | — | — | Uche Ikpeazu | 6 |
| 2021–22 | League 1 | 46 | 23 | 14 | 9 | 75 | 51 | 83 | 6th (Note: After beating Milton Keynes Dons 2–1 on aggregate in the play-off semi-final, lost 2–0 to Sunderland in the final.) | R1 | R3 | EFL Trophy | R1(S) | Sam Vokes | 16 |
| 2022–23 | League 1 | 46 | 20 | 9 | 17 | 59 | 51 | 69 | 9th | R1 | R2 | EFL Trophy | R1(S) | Anis Mehmeti | 9 |
| 2023–24 | League 1 | 46 | 17 | 14 | 15 | 60 | 55 | 65 | 10th | R2 | R2 | EFL Trophy | F (Note: Lost 2–1 to Peterborough United in the 2024 EFL Trophy final.) | Luke Leahy | 11 |
| 2024–25 | League 1 | 46 | 24 | 12 | 10 | 84 | 70 | 85 | 5th | R4 | R3 | EFL Trophy | R1(S) | Richard Kone | 18 |
| 2025–26 | League 1 | 46 | 17 | 12 | 17 | 69 | 58 | 63 | 11th | R2 | R4 | EFL Trophy | R2(S) | Cauley Woodrow Fred Onyedinma | 9 |
