= 1920–21 Isthmian League =

English football league season

The 1920–21 season was the 12th in the history of the Isthmian League, an English football competition.

Ilford were champions, winning their second Isthmian League title.

== League table ==
Isthmian League
- Season: 1920–21
- Champions: Ilford
- Matches: 132
- Goals: 489 (3.7 per match)

Pos	Team	Pld	W	D	L	GF	GA	GR	Pts
1	Ilford	22	16	4	2	70	24	2.917	36
2	London Caledonians	22	13	5	4	45	17	2.647	31
3	Tufnell Park	22	14	3	5	43	24	1.792	31
4	Nunhead	22	12	5	5	53	33	1.606	29
5	Dulwich Hamlet	22	11	6	5	60	30	2.000	28
6	Oxford City	22	12	3	7	56	38	1.474	27
7	Leytonstone	22	8	6	8	36	29	1.241	22
8	Clapton	22	7	7	8	33	52	0.635	21
9	Civil Service	22	3	7	12	28	45	0.622	13
10	Woking	22	3	5	14	16	43	0.372	11
11	Casuals	22	3	3	16	31	87	0.356	9
12	West Norwood	22	2	2	18	18	67	0.269	6

Source: fchd.com rsssf.com
Rules for classification: 1) points; 2) goal ratio.
