= 1919–20 Isthmian League =

The 1919–20 season was the 11th in the history of the Isthmian League, an English football competition.

Casuals, Civil Service and Tufnell Park were newly admitted, while four other clubs returned to the league after missing the short 1919 season. Dulwich Hamlet were champions, winning their first Isthmian League title.

== League table ==
Isthmian League
- Season: 1919–20
- Champions: Dulwich Hamlet
- Matches: 132
- Goals: 507 (3.84 per match)

Pos	Team	Pld	W	D	L	GF	GA	GR	Pts
1	Dulwich Hamlet	22	15	3	4	58	16	3.625	33
2	Nunhead	22	14	5	3	48	26	1.846	33
3	Tufnell Park	22	12	4	6	45	32	1.406	28
4	Ilford	22	13	1	8	63	42	1.500	27
5	Oxford City	22	12	3	7	63	51	1.235	27
6	London Caledonians	22	10	3	9	32	30	1.067	23
7	Leytonstone	22	8	3	11	50	43	1.163	19
8	Clapton	22	8	3	11	38	44	0.864	19
9	Civil Service	22	7	4	11	35	40	0.875	18
10	Woking	22	6	3	13	36	42	0.857	15
11	West Norwood	22	5	4	13	19	53	0.358	14
12	Casuals	22	3	2	17	20	88	0.227	8

Source: fchd.com rsssf.com
Rules for classification: 1) points; 2) goal ratio.
