= 1922–23 Isthmian League =

The 1922–23 season was the 14th in the history of the Isthmian League, an English football competition.

Clapton were champions, winning their second Isthmian League title. West Norwood resigned from the league at the end of the season and joined the Athenian League for 1924–25 season.

== League table ==
Isthmian League
- Season: 1922–23
- Champions: Clapton
- Matches: 182
- Goals: 678 (3.73 per match)

Pos	Team	Pld	W	D	L	GF	GA	GR	Pts	Results
1	Clapton	26	15	7	4	51	33	1.545	37	
2	Nunhead	26	15	5	6	52	32	1.625	35	
3	London Caledonians	26	13	7	6	43	26	1.654	33	
4	Ilford	26	11	7	8	57	38	1.500	29	
5	Casuals	26	12	5	9	68	51	1.333	29	
6	Civil Service	26	9	10	7	39	36	1.083	28	
7	Wycombe Wanderers	26	11	4	11	61	61	1.000	26	
8	Dulwich Hamlet	26	9	7	10	60	44	1.364	25	
9	Leytonstone	26	9	7	10	45	56	0.804	25	
10	Tufnell Park	26	9	5	12	41	45	0.911	23	
11	Wimbledon	26	10	2	14	49	50	0.980	22	
12	Woking	26	7	6	13	42	67	0.627	20	
13	Oxford City	26	6	5	15	45	68	0.662	17	
14	West Norwood	26	5	5	16	25	71	0.352	15	Resigned from the league

Source: fchd.com rsssf.com
Rules for classification: 1) points; 2) goal ratio.
