= 1912–13 Isthmian League =

The 1912–13 season was the eighth in the history of the Isthmian League, an English football competition.

London Caledonians were champions, winning their fourth Isthmian League title. At the end of the season Tunbridge Wells resigned from the league and joined the Spartan League.

== League table ==
Isthmian League
- Season: 1912–13
- Champions: London Caledonians
- Matches: 110
- Goals: 330 (3 per match)

| Pos | Team | Pld | W | D | L | GF | GA | GR | Pts | Results |
|---|---|---|---|---|---|---|---|---|---|---|
| 1 | London Caledonians | 20 | 14 | 5 | 1 | 38 | 12 | 3.167 | 33 | |
| 2 | Leytonstone | 20 | 12 | 3 | 5 | 45 | 20 | 2.250 | 27 | |
| 3 | Nunhead | 20 | 12 | 3 | 5 | 36 | 23 | 1.565 | 27 | |
| 4 | Clapton | 20 | 7 | 7 | 6 | 23 | 20 | 1.150 | 21 | |
| 5 | Dulwich Hamlet | 20 | 8 | 4 | 8 | 34 | 28 | 1.214 | 20 | |
| 6 | Woking | 20 | 7 | 5 | 8 | 33 | 40 | 0.825 | 19 | |
| 7 | Oxford City | 20 | 6 | 6 | 8 | 23 | 39 | 0.590 | 18 | |
| 8 | Ilford | 20 | 6 | 5 | 9 | 27 | 37 | 0.730 | 17 | |
| 9 | Shepherd's Bush | 20 | 5 | 5 | 10 | 26 | 38 | 0.684 | 15 | |
| 10 | Tunbridge Wells | 20 | 5 | 4 | 11 | 22 | 36 | 0.611 | 14 | Resigned to the Spartan League |
| 11 | West Norwood | 20 | 3 | 3 | 14 | 23 | 37 | 0.622 | 9 | |

Source: fchd.com rsssf.com
Rules for classification: 1) points; 2) goal ratio.
