= 1913–14 Isthmian League =

The 1913–14 season was the ninth in the history of the Isthmian League, an English football competition.

New Crusaders were newly admitted to what would be their only season in the Isthmian League. London Caledonians were champions, winning their fifth Isthmian League title.

It was the last season before the league was suspended for the First World War. Shepherd's Bush never returned to the league after the war, while four other clubs missed the short 1919 season.

== League table ==
Isthmian League
- Season: 1913–14
- Champions: London Caledonians
- Matches: 110
- Goals: 392 (3.56 per match)

| Pos | Team | Pld | W | D | L | GF | GA | GR | Pts | Qualification or relegation |
|---|---|---|---|---|---|---|---|---|---|---|
| 1 | London Caledonians | 20 | 12 | 6 | 2 | 55 | 23 | 2.391 | 30 | Did not return to league after World War I |
| 2 | Nunhead | 20 | 11 | 6 | 3 | 49 | 27 | 1.815 | 28 | |
| 3 | Ilford | 20 | 11 | 4 | 5 | 52 | 35 | 1.486 | 26 | |
| 4 | Dulwich Hamlet | 20 | 10 | 4 | 6 | 34 | 22 | 1.545 | 24 | |
| 5 | New Crusaders | 20 | 10 | 3 | 7 | 40 | 30 | 1.333 | 23 | Left league at end of season |
| 6 | Oxford City | 20 | 10 | 0 | 10 | 42 | 42 | 1.000 | 20 | Did not return to league after World War I |
| 7 | Leytonstone | 20 | 8 | 4 | 8 | 29 | 32 | 0.906 | 20 | |
| 8 | Clapton | 20 | 8 | 3 | 9 | 29 | 27 | 1.074 | 19 | |
| 9 | Shepherd's Bush | 20 | 7 | 2 | 11 | 24 | 46 | 0.522 | 16 | Left league at end of season |
| 10 | West Norwood | 20 | 4 | 3 | 13 | 27 | 47 | 0.574 | 11 | Did not return to league after World War I |
| 11 | Woking | 20 | 1 | 1 | 18 | 11 | 61 | 0.180 | 3 | Did not return to league after World War I |

Source: fchd.com rsssf.com
Rules for classification: 1) points; 2) goal ratio.
