= 1923–24 Isthmian League =

The 1923–24 season was the 15th in the history of the Isthmian League, an English football competition.

At the end of the previous season West Norwood resigned from the league. St Albans City joined the competition from Athenian League and became champions in their inaugural season.

== League table ==
Isthmian League
- Season: 1923–24
- Champions: St Albans City
- Matches: 182
- Goals: 755 (4.15 per match)

Pos	Team	Pld	W	D	L	GF	GA	GR	Pts
1	St Albans City	26	17	5	4	72	38	1.895	39
2	Dulwich Hamlet	26	15	6	5	49	28	1.750	36
3	Clapton	26	14	5	7	73	50	1.460	33
4	Wycombe Wanderers	26	14	5	7	88	65	1.354	33
5	London Caledonians	26	14	3	9	53	49	1.082	31
6	Civil Service	26	12	5	9	52	47	1.106	29
7	Casuals	26	13	1	12	65	54	1.204	27
8	Ilford	26	9	6	11	56	59	0.949	24
9	Nunhead	26	8	8	10	41	46	0.891	24
10	Wimbledon	26	8	4	14	43	62	0.694	20
11	Tufnell Park	26	8	2	16	38	53	0.717	18
12	Woking	26	5	8	13	31	62	0.500	18
13	Oxford City	26	7	2	17	53	74	0.716	16
14	Leytonstone	26	6	4	16	41	68	0.603	16

Source: fchd.com rsssf.com
Rules for classification: 1) points; 2) goal ratio.
