= 1921–22 Isthmian League =

The 1921–22 season was the 13th in the history of the Isthmian League, an English football competition.

Wimbledon and Wycombe Wanderers were newly admitted. Ilford were champions for the second season in a row, winning their third Isthmian League title.

== League table ==
Isthmian League
- Season: 1921–22
- Champions: Ilford
- Matches: 182
- Goals: 681 (3.74 per match)

Pos	Team	Pld	W	D	L	GF	GA	GR	Pts
1	Ilford	26	17	4	5	66	34	1.941	38
2	Dulwich Hamlet	26	14	8	4	65	24	2.708	36
3	London Caledonians	26	16	4	6	41	21	1.952	36
4	Nunhead	26	12	5	9	65	41	1.585	29
5	Clapton	26	13	3	10	51	46	1.109	29
6	Tufnell Park	26	10	7	9	44	39	1.128	27
7	Oxford City	26	12	2	12	48	47	1.021	26
8	Wycombe Wanderers	26	12	2	12	61	64	0.953	26
9	Civil Service	26	9	8	9	40	48	0.833	26
10	Woking	26	10	6	10	39	49	0.796	26
11	Leytonstone	26	9	6	11	41	48	0.854	24
12	West Norwood	26	8	5	13	43	57	0.754	21
13	Wimbledon	26	7	4	15	52	56	0.929	18
14	Casuals	26	0	2	24	25	107	0.234	2

Source: fchd.com rsssf.com
Rules for classification: 1) points; 2) goal ratio.
