= 1919 Isthmian League =

The 1919 season was the tenth in the history of the Isthmian League, an English football competition.

Of the eleven clubs who competed in the 1913–14 season, only five returned for this season; four did not resume until the 1919–20 season, whilst two (New Crusaders and Shepherd's Bush) had left the league. Leytonstone were champions, winning their first Isthmian League title.

== League table ==
Isthmian League
- Season: 1919
- Champions: Leytonstone
- Matches: 20
- Goals: 94 (4.7 per match)

Pos	Team	Pld	W	D	L	GF	GA	GR	Pts
1	Leytonstone	8	5	1	2	21	7	3.000	11
2	Ilford	8	4	2	2	22	16	1.375	10
3	Dulwich Hamlet	8	3	2	3	19	17	1.118	8
4	Nunhead	8	3	2	3	18	19	0.947	8
5	Clapton	8	0	3	5	14	35	0.400	3

Source: fchd.com rsssf.com
Rules for classification: 1) points; 2) goal ratio.
