= 1930–31 Isthmian League =

The 1930–31 season was the 22nd in the history of the Isthmian League, an English football competition.

Wimbledon were champions, winning their first Isthmian League title.

== League table ==
Isthmian League
- Season: 1930–31
- Champions: Wimbledon
- Matches: 182
- Goals: 788 (4.33 per match)

| Pos | Team | Pld | W | D | L | GF | GA | GR | Pts |
|---|---|---|---|---|---|---|---|---|---|
| 1 | Wimbledon | 26 | 18 | 6 | 2 | 69 | 37 | 1.865 | 42 |
| 2 | Dulwich Hamlet | 26 | 12 | 9 | 5 | 51 | 39 | 1.308 | 33 |
| 3 | Wycombe Wanderers | 26 | 12 | 6 | 8 | 67 | 45 | 1.489 | 30 |
| 4 | Casuals | 26 | 12 | 6 | 8 | 71 | 56 | 1.268 | 30 |
| 5 | St Albans City | 26 | 11 | 7 | 8 | 67 | 66 | 1.015 | 29 |
| 6 | Ilford | 26 | 10 | 6 | 10 | 70 | 62 | 1.129 | 26 |
| 7 | Oxford City | 26 | 10 | 5 | 11 | 43 | 48 | 0.896 | 25 |
| 8 | London Caledonians | 26 | 8 | 8 | 10 | 43 | 53 | 0.811 | 24 |
| 9 | Kingstonian | 26 | 10 | 4 | 12 | 49 | 64 | 0.766 | 24 |
| 10 | Tufnell Park | 26 | 9 | 5 | 12 | 45 | 61 | 0.738 | 23 |
| 11 | Nunhead | 26 | 9 | 4 | 13 | 49 | 54 | 0.907 | 22 |
| 12 | Woking | 26 | 9 | 4 | 13 | 56 | 63 | 0.889 | 22 |
| 13 | Clapton | 26 | 7 | 4 | 15 | 62 | 75 | 0.827 | 18 |
| 14 | Leytonstone | 26 | 6 | 4 | 16 | 46 | 65 | 0.708 | 16 |

Source: fchd.com rsssf.com
Rules for classification: 1) points; 2) goal ratio.
