= 1928–29 Isthmian League =

The 1928–29 season was the 20th in the history of the Isthmian League, an English football competition.

Nunhead were champions, winning their first Isthmian League title. At the end of the season Civil Service resigned from the league.

== League table ==
Isthmian League
- Season: 1928–29
- Champions: Nunhead
- Matches: 182
- Goals: 793 (4.36 per match)

Pos	Team	Pld	W	D	L	GF	GA	GR	Pts	Results
1	Nunhead	26	15	6	5	47	35	1.343	36	
2	London Caledonians	26	15	4	7	65	33	1.970	34	
3	Dulwich Hamlet	26	14	6	6	65	34	1.912	34	
4	Wimbledon	26	9	10	7	66	54	1.222	28	
5	Ilford	26	12	3	11	67	52	1.288	27	
6	Clapton	26	11	5	10	60	55	1.091	27	
7	Tufnell Park	26	11	5	10	58	55	1.055	27	
8	St Albans City	26	12	3	11	63	69	0.913	27	
9	Leytonstone	26	11	3	12	56	79	0.709	25	
10	Wycombe Wanderers	26	10	3	13	58	60	0.967	23	
11	Oxford City	26	10	3	13	61	71	0.859	23	
12	Casuals	26	8	5	13	49	60	0.817	21	
13	Woking	26	8	3	15	39	65	0.600	19	
14	Civil Service	26	4	5	17	39	71	0.549	13	Resigned from the league

Source: fchd.com rsssf.com
Rules for classification: 1) points; 2) goal ratio.
