= 1952–53 Isthmian League =

The 1952–53 season was the 38th in the history of the Isthmian League, an English football competition.

At the end of the previous season Tufnell Park Edmonton resigned from the league. Isthmian league expanded up to 15 clubs after Athenian League sides Barking and Bromley were admitted.

Walthamstow Avenue were champions, winning their second Isthmian League title.

== League table ==
Isthmian League
- Season: 1952–53
- Champions: Walthamstow Avenue
- Matches: 210
- Goals: 802 (3.82 per match)

| Pos | Team | Pld | W | D | L | GF | GA | GR | Pts |
|---|---|---|---|---|---|---|---|---|---|
| 1 | Walthamstow Avenue | 28 | 19 | 6 | 3 | 53 | 25 | 2.120 | 44 |
| 2 | Bromley | 28 | 17 | 4 | 7 | 71 | 35 | 2.029 | 38 |
| 3 | Leytonstone | 28 | 14 | 6 | 8 | 60 | 38 | 1.579 | 34 |
| 4 | Wimbledon | 28 | 14 | 5 | 9 | 68 | 37 | 1.838 | 33 |
| 5 | Kingstonian | 28 | 13 | 6 | 9 | 62 | 50 | 1.240 | 32 |
| 6 | Dulwich Hamlet | 28 | 15 | 2 | 11 | 62 | 52 | 1.192 | 32 |
| 6 | Romford | 28 | 12 | 8 | 8 | 62 | 52 | 1.192 | 32 |
| 8 | Wycombe Wanderers | 28 | 14 | 2 | 12 | 54 | 62 | 0.871 | 30 |
| 9 | St Albans City | 28 | 11 | 6 | 11 | 43 | 57 | 0.754 | 28 |
| 10 | Barking | 28 | 9 | 7 | 12 | 42 | 51 | 0.824 | 25 |
| 11 | Ilford | 28 | 10 | 4 | 14 | 59 | 57 | 1.035 | 24 |
| 12 | Woking | 28 | 10 | 4 | 14 | 57 | 72 | 0.792 | 24 |
| 13 | Corinthian-Casuals | 28 | 7 | 9 | 12 | 45 | 56 | 0.804 | 23 |
| 14 | Oxford City | 28 | 5 | 2 | 21 | 37 | 87 | 0.425 | 12 |
| 15 | Clapton | 28 | 2 | 5 | 21 | 27 | 71 | 0.380 | 9 |

Source: fchd.com rsssf.com
Rules for classification: 1) points; 2) goal ratio.
