= 1945–46 Isthmian League =

The 1945–46 season was the 31st in the history of the Isthmian League, an English football competition.

It was the first season after the break caused by World War II.

Nunhead and London Caledonians did not return after the war, while two clubs from the Athenian League - Romford and Walthamstow Avenue were newly admitted. Also, it was the first season in the Isthmian League for a new club Corinthian-Casuals, who took over a place of Casuals, who merged with Corinthian.

Walthamstow Avenue were champions in their inaugural season.

== League table ==
Isthmian League
- Season: 1945–46
- Champions: Walthamstow Avenue
- Matches: 182
- Goals: 917 (5.04 per match)

Pos	Team	Pld	W	D	L	GF	GA	GR	Pts
1	Walthamstow Avenue	26	21	0	5	100	31	3.226	42
2	Oxford City	26	17	6	3	91	40	2.275	40
3	Romford	26	15	3	8	83	59	1.407	33
4	Dulwich Hamlet	26	14	2	10	63	59	1.068	30
5	Tufnell Park	26	12	4	10	70	55	1.273	28
6	Woking	26	10	7	9	56	51	1.098	27
7	Ilford	26	12	2	12	56	71	0.789	26
8	Leytonstone	26	11	3	12	61	75	0.813	25
9	Wycombe Wanderers	26	9	3	14	80	88	0.909	21
10	Wimbledon	26	7	6	13	52	72	0.722	20
11	Corinthian-Casuals	26	8	4	14	58	83	0.699	20
12	Clapton	26	8	3	15	51	62	0.823	19
13	St Albans City	26	6	6	14	48	85	0.565	18
14	Kingstonian	26	6	3	17	48	86	0.558	15

Source: fchd.com rsssf.com
Rules for classification: 1) points; 2) goal ratio.
