= 1961–62 Isthmian League =

The 1961–62 season was the 47th in the history of the Isthmian League, an English football competition.

Wimbledon were champions, winning their sixth Isthmian League title.

== League table ==
Isthmian League
- Season: 1961–62
- Champions: Wimbledon
- Matches: 240
- Goals: 844 (3.52 per match)

| Pos | Team | Pld | W | D | L | GF | GA | GR | Pts |
|---|---|---|---|---|---|---|---|---|---|
| 1 | Wimbledon | 30 | 19 | 6 | 5 | 68 | 24 | 2.833 | 44 |
| 2 | Leytonstone | 30 | 17 | 7 | 6 | 61 | 44 | 1.386 | 41 |
| 3 | Walthamstow Avenue | 30 | 14 | 8 | 8 | 51 | 31 | 1.645 | 36 |
| 4 | Kingstonian | 30 | 15 | 5 | 10 | 65 | 48 | 1.354 | 35 |
| 5 | Tooting & Mitcham United | 30 | 12 | 10 | 8 | 62 | 47 | 1.319 | 34 |
| 6 | Oxford City | 30 | 12 | 9 | 9 | 56 | 49 | 1.143 | 33 |
| 7 | Wycombe Wanderers | 30 | 12 | 7 | 11 | 57 | 51 | 1.118 | 31 |
| 8 | Corinthian-Casuals | 30 | 12 | 7 | 11 | 45 | 51 | 0.882 | 31 |
| 9 | St Albans City | 30 | 10 | 9 | 11 | 55 | 55 | 1.000 | 29 |
| 10 | Woking | 30 | 9 | 9 | 12 | 51 | 60 | 0.850 | 27 |
| 11 | Dulwich Hamlet | 30 | 11 | 4 | 15 | 55 | 66 | 0.833 | 26 |
| 12 | Barking | 30 | 9 | 8 | 13 | 40 | 64 | 0.625 | 26 |
| 13 | Ilford | 30 | 7 | 10 | 13 | 50 | 59 | 0.847 | 24 |
| 14 | Bromley | 30 | 10 | 4 | 16 | 49 | 69 | 0.710 | 24 |
| 15 | Clapton | 30 | 6 | 8 | 16 | 45 | 67 | 0.672 | 20 |
| 16 | Maidstone United | 30 | 6 | 7 | 17 | 34 | 59 | 0.576 | 19 |

Source: fchd.com rsssf.com
Rules for classification: 1) points; 2) goal ratio.
