= 1932–33 Isthmian League =

The 1932–33 season was the 24th in the history of the Isthmian League, an English football competition.

Dulwich Hamlet were champions, winning their third Isthmian League title.

== League table ==
Isthmian League
- Season: 1932–33
- Champions: Dulwich Hamlet
- Matches: 182
- Goals: 762 (4.19 per match)

Pos	Team	Pld	W	D	L	GF	GA	GR	Pts
1	Dulwich Hamlet	26	15	6	5	71	45	1.578	36
2	Leytonstone	26	16	4	6	66	43	1.535	36
3	Kingstonian	26	15	2	9	77	49	1.571	32
4	Ilford	26	14	0	12	60	58	1.034	28
5	Casuals	26	12	2	12	48	36	1.333	26
6	Tufnell Park	26	11	3	12	51	51	1.000	25
7	St Albans City	26	12	1	13	57	63	0.905	25
8	Clapton	26	10	5	11	51	65	0.785	25
9	Oxford City	26	9	6	11	49	54	0.907	24
10	Woking	26	10	4	12	53	61	0.869	24
11	Wycombe Wanderers	26	10	4	12	47	56	0.839	24
12	Nunhead	26	8	6	12	42	50	0.840	22
13	Wimbledon	26	8	5	13	55	67	0.821	21
14	London Caledonians	26	5	6	15	35	64	0.547	16

Source: fchd.com rsssf.com
Rules for classification: 1) points; 2) goal ratio.
