= 1925–26 Isthmian League =

The 1925–26 Isthmian League was the 17th season in the history of the Isthmian League, an English football competition.

Dulwich Hamlet were champions, winning their second Isthmian League title.

== League table ==
Isthmian League
- Season: 1925–26
- Champions: Dulwich Hamlet
- Matches: 182
- Goals: 895 (4.92 per match)

| Pos | Team | Pld | W | D | L | GF | GA | GR | Pts |
|---|---|---|---|---|---|---|---|---|---|
| 1 | Dulwich Hamlet | 26 | 20 | 1 | 5 | 80 | 49 | 1.633 | 41 |
| 2 | London Caledonians | 26 | 18 | 1 | 7 | 81 | 44 | 1.841 | 37 |
| 3 | Clapton | 26 | 14 | 4 | 8 | 64 | 50 | 1.280 | 32 |
| 4 | Wycombe Wanderers | 26 | 14 | 3 | 9 | 97 | 83 | 1.169 | 31 |
| 5 | St Albans City | 26 | 12 | 6 | 8 | 76 | 54 | 1.407 | 30 |
| 6 | Nunhead | 26 | 13 | 4 | 9 | 49 | 43 | 1.140 | 30 |
| 7 | Ilford | 26 | 13 | 2 | 11 | 81 | 70 | 1.157 | 28 |
| 8 | Leytonstone | 26 | 12 | 1 | 13 | 75 | 63 | 1.190 | 25 |
| 9 | Woking | 26 | 8 | 6 | 12 | 56 | 73 | 0.767 | 22 |
| 10 | Tufnell Park | 26 | 8 | 5 | 13 | 36 | 53 | 0.679 | 21 |
| 11 | Casuals | 26 | 8 | 4 | 14 | 48 | 61 | 0.787 | 20 |
| 12 | Wimbledon | 26 | 9 | 1 | 16 | 61 | 77 | 0.792 | 19 |
| 13 | Oxford City | 26 | 8 | 1 | 17 | 48 | 76 | 0.632 | 17 |
| 14 | Civil Service | 26 | 5 | 1 | 20 | 43 | 99 | 0.434 | 11 |

Source: fchd.com rsssf.com
Rules for classification: 1) points; 2) goal ratio.
