= 1959–60 Isthmian League =

The 1959–60 season was the 45th in the history of the Isthmian League, an English football competition.

At the end of the previous season Romford were transferred to the Southern Football League, while Maidstone United were newly admitted to the league from Athenian League.

Tooting & Mitcham United were champions, winning their second Isthmian League title.

== League table ==
Isthmian League
- Season: 1959–60
- Champions: Tooting & Mitcham United
- Matches: 240
- Goals: 910 (3.79 per match)

Pos	Team	Pld	W	D	L	GF	GA	GR	Pts
1	Tooting & Mitcham United	30	17	8	5	75	43	1.744	42
2	Wycombe Wanderers	30	19	3	8	84	46	1.826	41
3	Wimbledon	30	18	3	9	66	36	1.833	39
4	Kingstonian	30	18	3	9	76	51	1.490	39
5	Corinthian-Casuals	30	18	1	11	69	61	1.131	37
6	Bromley	30	15	6	9	74	46	1.609	36
7	Dulwich Hamlet	30	14	6	10	65	47	1.383	34
8	Walthamstow Avenue	30	11	11	8	48	38	1.263	33
9	Oxford City	30	10	10	10	57	57	1.000	30
10	Leytonstone	30	10	8	12	43	46	0.935	28
11	Woking	30	10	6	14	54	61	0.885	26
12	St Albans City	30	10	6	14	50	65	0.769	26
13	Maidstone United	30	10	5	15	53	60	0.883	25
14	Barking	30	7	4	19	30	75	0.400	18
15	Ilford	30	5	6	19	34	86	0.395	16
16	Clapton	30	3	4	23	32	92	0.348	10

Source: fchd.com rsssf.com
Rules for classification: 1) points; 2) goal ratio.
