= 1933–34 Isthmian League =

The 1933–34 season was the 25th in the history of the Isthmian League, an English football competition.

Kingstonian were champions, winning their first Isthmian League title.

== League table ==
Isthmian League
- Season: 1933–34
- Champions: Kingstonian
- Matches: 182
- Goals: 729 (4.01 per match)

Pos	Team	Pld	W	D	L	GF	GA	GR	Pts
1	Kingstonian	26	15	7	4	80	42	1.905	37
2	Dulwich Hamlet	26	15	5	6	68	36	1.889	35
3	Wimbledon	26	13	7	6	63	35	1.800	33
4	Tufnell Park	26	14	5	7	55	50	1.100	33
5	Ilford	26	15	2	9	60	56	1.071	32
6	Casuals	26	13	5	8	47	32	1.469	31
7	Leytonstone	26	13	3	10	55	48	1.146	29
8	Nunhead	26	10	5	11	48	44	1.091	25
9	London Caledonians	26	7	8	11	29	51	0.569	22
10	Wycombe Wanderers	26	9	2	15	57	60	0.950	20
11	St Albans City	26	8	4	14	44	75	0.587	20
12	Oxford City	26	7	4	15	45	57	0.789	18
13	Clapton	26	5	6	15	35	62	0.565	16
14	Woking	26	6	1	19	43	81	0.531	13

Source: fchd.com rsssf.com
Rules for classification: 1) points; 2) goal ratio.
