= 1960–61 Isthmian League =

The 1960–61 season was the 46th in the history of the Isthmian League, an English football competition.

Bromley were champions, winning their fourth Isthmian League title.

== League table ==
Isthmian League
- Season: 1960–61
- Champions: Bromley
- Matches: 240
- Goals: 911 (3.8 per match)

Pos	Team	Pld	W	D	L	GF	GA	GR	Pts
1	Bromley	30	20	6	4	89	42	2.119	46
2	Walthamstow Avenue	30	20	5	5	87	38	2.289	45
3	Wimbledon	30	18	6	6	72	43	1.674	42
4	Dulwich Hamlet	30	17	4	9	71	59	1.203	38
5	Maidstone United	30	14	8	8	63	39	1.615	36
6	Leytonstone	30	15	6	9	46	34	1.353	36
7	Tooting & Mitcham United	30	14	3	13	69	51	1.353	31
8	Wycombe Wanderers	30	12	5	13	63	61	1.033	29
9	St Albans City	30	12	4	14	45	72	0.625	28
10	Oxford City	30	10	7	13	59	59	1.000	27
11	Corinthian-Casuals	30	9	9	12	49	59	0.831	27
12	Kingstonian	30	10	6	14	55	61	0.902	26
13	Woking	30	10	6	14	58	71	0.817	26
14	Ilford	30	5	8	17	30	69	0.435	18
15	Barking	30	3	8	19	30	76	0.395	14
16	Clapton	30	3	5	22	25	77	0.325	11

Source: fchd.com rsssf.com
Rules for classification: 1) points; 2) goal ratio.
