= Darran Hay =

English footballer

Personal information
- Full name: Darran Andrew Hay
- Date of birth: 17 December 1969 (age 56)
- Place of birth: Hitchin, England
- Height: 1.83 m (6 ft 0 in)
- Position: Forward

Senior career*
| Years | Team | Apps | (Gls) |
| –1993 | Biggleswade Town | | |
| 1993–1995 | Cambridge United | 29 | (3) |
| 1993 | → Woking (loan) | 8 | (4) |
| 1995–2000 | Woking | 200 | (81) |
| 1996 | → Cambridge United (loan) | 4 | (0) |
| 2000–2002 | Stevenage Borough | 40 | (21) |
- Chesham United
- Carshalton Athletic
- Harrow Borough
- Hitchin Town
| | King's Lynn | 14 | (3) |
| 2005 | Aylesbury United | 7 | (1) |
- Arlesey Town
- * Club domestic league appearances and goals

Darran Andrew Hay (born 17 December 1969 in Hitchin, England), is an English former footballer who played as a forward. He played in the Football League for Cambridge United and in non-League football for Biggleswade Town, Woking, Stevenage Borough, Chesham United, Carshalton Athletic, Harrow Borough, Hitchin Town, King's Lynn, Aylesbury United and Arlesey Town.

== Honours ==
Woking

- FA Trophy: 1993–94, 1994–95, 1996–97
