= 1935–36 Isthmian League =

Isthmian League
- Season: 1935–36
- Champions: Wimbledon
- Matches: 182
- Goals: 742 (4.08 per match)

The 1935–36 season was the 27th in the history of the Isthmian League, an English football competition.

Wimbledon were champions for the second time in a row, winning fourth Isthmian League title.

== League table ==
Pos	Team	Pld	W	D	L	GF	GA	GR	Pts
1	Wimbledon	26	19	2	5	82	29	2.828	40
2	Casuals	26	14	5	7	60	45	1.333	33
3	Ilford	26	13	3	10	67	47	1.426	29
4	Dulwich Hamlet	26	10	8	8	64	47	1.362	28
5	Nunhead	26	11	6	9	51	40	1.275	28
6	Wycombe Wanderers	26	13	2	11	60	68	0.882	28
7	Clapton	26	11	5	10	42	46	0.913	27
8	Oxford City	26	11	4	11	60	58	1.034	26
9	St Albans City	26	11	2	13	59	64	0.922	24
10	Woking	26	9	4	13	43	62	0.694	22
11	Tufnell Park	26	9	3	14	42	61	0.689	21
12	London Caledonians	26	9	3	14	35	52	0.673	21
13	Kingstonian	26	9	2	15	43	56	0.768	20
14	Leytonstone	26	7	3	16	34	67	0.507	17

Source: fchd.com rsssf.com
Rules for classification: 1) points; 2) goal ratio.
