= 1924–25 Isthmian League =

Football season in eastern and south-eastern England

The 1924–25 season was the 16th in the history of the Isthmian League, an English football competition.

London Caledonians were champions, winning their sixth Isthmian League title.

== League table ==
Isthmian League
- Season: 1924–25
- Champions: London Caledonians
- Matches: 182
- Goals: 730 (4.01 per match)

Pos	Team	Pld	W	D	L	GF	GA	GR	Pts
1	London Caledonians	26	18	5	3	76	36	2.111	41
2	Clapton	26	19	1	6	64	34	1.882	39
3	St Albans City	26	16	2	8	69	39	1.769	34
4	Tufnell Park	26	11	4	11	47	41	1.146	26
5	Ilford	26	11	4	11	46	42	1.095	26
6	Leytonstone	26	12	2	12	55	63	0.873	26
7	Casuals	26	12	1	13	55	58	0.948	25
8	Wycombe Wanderers	26	11	2	13	58	61	0.951	24
9	Civil Service	26	10	4	12	52	64	0.813	24
10	Nunhead	26	9	5	12	45	43	1.047	23
11	Wimbledon	26	10	2	14	50	54	0.926	22
12	Dulwich Hamlet	26	8	5	13	42	57	0.737	21
13	Oxford City	26	9	2	15	38	71	0.535	20
14	Woking	26	5	3	18	33	67	0.493	13

Source: fchd.com rsssf.com
Rules for classification: 1) points; 2) goal ratio.
