= 1927–28 Isthmian League =

The 1927–28 season was the 19th in the history of the Isthmian League, an English football competition.

St Albans City were champions for the second season in a row, winning their third Isthmian League title.

== League table ==
Isthmian League
- Season: 1927–28
- Champions: St Albans City
- Matches: 182
- Goals: 794 (4.36 per match)

Pos	Team	Pld	W	D	L	GF	GA	GR	Pts
1	St Albans City	26	15	5	6	86	50	1.720	35
2	London Caledonians	26	12	9	5	63	38	1.658	33
3	Ilford	26	14	4	8	72	54	1.333	32
4	Woking	26	13	5	8	72	56	1.286	31
5	Nunhead	26	13	2	11	57	54	1.056	28
6	Wimbledon	26	12	3	11	57	48	1.188	27
7	Leytonstone	26	13	1	12	53	56	0.946	27
8	Clapton	26	8	10	8	52	47	1.106	26
9	Dulwich Hamlet	26	8	9	9	56	49	1.143	25
10	Casuals	26	8	8	10	54	58	0.931	24
11	Wycombe Wanderers	26	9	5	12	60	69	0.870	23
12	Oxford City	26	7	7	12	36	57	0.632	21
13	Civil Service	26	8	4	14	38	76	0.500	20
14	Tufnell Park	26	4	4	18	38	82	0.463	12

Source: fchd.com rsssf.com
Rules for classification: 1) points; 2) goal ratio.
