= 1934–35 Isthmian League =

The 1934–35 season was the 26th in the history of the Isthmian League, an English football competition.

Wimbledon were champions, winning their third Isthmian League title.

== League table ==
Isthmian League
- Season: 1934–35
- Champions: Wimbledon
- Matches: 182
- Goals: 698 (3.84 per match)

Pos	Team	Pld	W	D	L	GF	GA	GR	Pts
1	Wimbledon	26	14	7	5	63	30	2.100	35
2	Oxford City	26	14	4	8	69	50	1.380	32
3	Leytonstone	26	15	2	9	49	36	1.361	32
4	Dulwich Hamlet	26	11	7	8	66	45	1.467	29
5	Tufnell Park	26	11	7	8	53	44	1.205	29
6	Kingstonian	26	11	6	9	44	40	1.100	28
7	Nunhead	26	10	7	9	35	34	1.029	27
8	London Caledonians	26	9	7	10	40	41	0.976	25
9	St Albans City	26	9	6	11	61	80	0.763	24
10	Ilford	26	9	6	11	40	56	0.714	24
11	Clapton	26	7	7	12	46	48	0.958	21
12	Woking	26	9	3	14	44	68	0.647	21
13	Wycombe Wanderers	26	7	6	13	51	69	0.739	20
14	Casuals	26	6	5	15	37	57	0.649	17

Source: fchd.com rsssf.com
Rules for classification: 1) points; 2) goal ratio.
