= 1936–37 Isthmian League =

The 1936–37 season was the 28th in the history of the Isthmian League, an English football competition.

Kingstonian were champions, winning their second Isthmian League title.

== League table ==
Isthmian League
- Season: 1936–37
- Champions: Kingstonian
- Matches: 182
- Goals: 778 (4.27 per match)

| Pos | Team | Pld | W | D | L | GF | GA | GR | Pts |
|---|---|---|---|---|---|---|---|---|---|
| 1 | Kingstonian | 26 | 18 | 3 | 5 | 63 | 43 | 1.465 | 39 |
| 2 | Nunhead | 26 | 17 | 3 | 6 | 77 | 32 | 2.406 | 37 |
| 3 | Leytonstone | 26 | 16 | 4 | 6 | 71 | 42 | 1.690 | 36 |
| 4 | Ilford | 26 | 14 | 5 | 7 | 86 | 39 | 2.205 | 33 |
| 5 | Dulwich Hamlet | 26 | 12 | 6 | 8 | 64 | 48 | 1.333 | 30 |
| 6 | Wycombe Wanderers | 26 | 10 | 5 | 11 | 55 | 52 | 1.058 | 25 |
| 7 | Wimbledon | 26 | 9 | 7 | 10 | 52 | 53 | 0.981 | 25 |
| 8 | Clapton | 26 | 10 | 5 | 11 | 42 | 51 | 0.824 | 25 |
| 9 | Casuals | 26 | 10 | 3 | 13 | 46 | 58 | 0.793 | 23 |
| 10 | Woking | 26 | 9 | 4 | 13 | 53 | 69 | 0.768 | 22 |
| 11 | Oxford City | 26 | 8 | 5 | 13 | 56 | 89 | 0.629 | 21 |
| 12 | St Albans City | 26 | 7 | 5 | 14 | 44 | 62 | 0.710 | 19 |
| 13 | Tufnell Park | 26 | 4 | 7 | 15 | 43 | 74 | 0.581 | 15 |
| 14 | London Caledonians | 26 | 5 | 4 | 17 | 26 | 66 | 0.394 | 14 |

Source: fchd.com rsssf.com
Rules for classification: 1) points; 2) goal ratio.
