= 1958–59 Isthmian League =

The 1958–59 season was the 44th in the history of the Isthmian League, an English football competition.

Wimbledon were champions, winning their fifth Isthmian League title. At the end of the season Romford switched to the Southern Football League.

== League table ==
Isthmian League
- Season: 1958–59
- Champions: Wimbledon
- Matches: 240
- Goals: 1,009 (4.2 per match)

Pos	Team	Pld	W	D	L	GF	GA	GR	Pts	Results
1	Wimbledon	30	22	3	5	91	38	2.395	47	
2	Dulwich Hamlet	30	18	5	7	68	44	1.545	41	
3	Wycombe Wanderers	30	18	4	8	93	50	1.860	40	
4	Oxford City	30	17	4	9	87	58	1.500	38	
5	Walthamstow Avenue	30	16	5	9	59	40	1.475	37	
6	Tooting & Mitcham United	30	15	4	11	84	55	1.527	34	
7	Barking	30	14	2	14	59	53	1.113	30	
8	Woking	30	12	6	12	66	66	1.000	30	
9	Bromley	30	11	7	12	56	55	1.018	29	
10	Clapton	30	10	6	14	55	67	0.821	26	
11	Ilford	30	10	6	14	46	67	0.687	26	
12	Kingstonian	30	9	4	17	54	72	0.750	22	
13	St Albans City	30	8	6	16	53	89	0.596	22	
14	Leytonstone	30	7	6	17	40	87	0.460	20	
15	Romford	30	7	5	18	54	76	0.711	19	Switched to the SFL Division One
16	Corinthian-Casuals	30	7	5	18	44	92	0.478	19	

Source: fchd.com rsssf.com
Rules for classification: 1) points; 2) goal ratio.
