= 1948–49 Isthmian League =

The 1948–49 season was the 34th in the history of the Isthmian League, an English football competition.

Dulwich Hamlet were champions, winning their fourth Isthmian League title.

== League table ==
Isthmian League
- Season: 1948–49
- Champions: Dulwich Hamlet
- Matches: 182
- Goals: 692 (3.8 per match)

Pos	Team	Pld	W	D	L	GF	GA	GR	Pts
1	Dulwich Hamlet	26	15	6	5	60	31	1.935	36
2	Walthamstow Avenue	26	16	4	6	65	38	1.711	36
3	Wimbledon	26	15	4	7	64	41	1.561	34
4	Ilford	26	14	3	9	56	36	1.556	31
5	Oxford City	26	13	5	8	48	34	1.412	31
6	Leytonstone	26	12	6	8	49	41	1.195	30
7	Woking	26	14	1	11	64	59	1.085	29
8	Romford	26	11	3	12	47	54	0.870	25
9	Kingstonian	26	10	4	12	43	47	0.915	24
10	Corinthian-Casuals	26	11	2	13	47	59	0.797	24
11	Wycombe Wanderers	26	11	2	13	49	61	0.803	24
12	St Albans City	26	6	6	14	40	60	0.667	16 (Note: St Albans City were deducted two points.)
13	Clapton	26	5	5	16	32	61	0.525	15
14	Tufnell Park	26	1	5	20	28	70	0.400	7

Source: fchd.com rsssf.com
Rules for classification: 1) points; 2) goal ratio.
