= 1954–55 Isthmian League =

The 1954–55 season was the 40th in the history of the Isthmian League, an English football competition.

Walthamstow Avenue were champions, winning their third Isthmian League title.

== League table ==
Isthmian League
- Season: 1954–55
- Champions: Walthamstow Avenue
- Matches: 210
- Goals: 824 (3.92 per match)

Pos	Team	Pld	W	D	L	GF	GA	GR	Pts
1	Walthamstow Avenue	28	21	1	6	80	38	2.105	43
2	St Albans City	28	18	3	7	61	41	1.488	39
3	Bromley	28	18	2	8	66	34	1.941	38
4	Wycombe Wanderers	28	16	3	9	68	43	1.581	35
5	Ilford	28	13	5	10	64	46	1.391	31
6	Barking	28	15	1	12	55	51	1.078	31
7	Woking	28	12	3	13	75	79	0.949	27
8	Kingstonian	28	10	7	11	47	57	0.825	27
9	Leytonstone	28	10	4	14	35	51	0.686	24
10	Oxford City	28	10	3	15	43	74	0.581	23
11	Clapton	28	9	4	15	41	50	0.820	22
12	Wimbledon	28	10	2	16	48	62	0.774	22
13	Corinthian-Casuals	28	9	3	16	50	65	0.769	21
14	Dulwich Hamlet	28	7	5	16	48	60	0.800	19
15	Romford	28	4	10	14	43	73	0.589	18

Source: fchd.com rsssf.com
Rules for classification: 1) points; 2) goal ratio.

== Team kits ==
Wimbledon	Wycombe Wanderers
