= 1931–32 Isthmian League =

The 1931–32 season was the 23rd in the history of the Isthmian League, an English football competition.

Wimbledon were champions for the second season in a row.

== League table ==
Isthmian League
- Season: 1931–32
- Champions: Wimbledon
- Matches: 182
- Goals: 780 (4.29 per match)

Pos	Team	Pld	W	D	L	GF	GA	GR	Pts
1	Wimbledon	26	17	2	7	60	35	1.714	36
2	Ilford	26	13	9	4	71	45	1.578	35
3	Dulwich Hamlet	26	15	3	8	69	43	1.605	33
4	Wycombe Wanderers	26	14	5	7	72	50	1.440	33
5	Oxford City	26	15	2	9	63	49	1.286	32
6	Kingstonian	26	13	3	10	71	50	1.420	29
7	Tufnell Park	26	9	7	10	50	48	1.042	25
8	Nunhead	26	9	7	10	54	61	0.885	25
9	Casuals	26	10	4	12	59	65	0.908	24
10	Clapton	26	9	5	12	50	57	0.877	23
11	Leytonstone	26	9	3	14	36	61	0.590	21
12	St Albans City	26	8	4	14	57	78	0.731	20
13	Woking	26	6	5	15	44	64	0.688	17
14	London Caledonians	26	2	7	17	24	74	0.324	11

Source: fchd.com rsssf.com
Rules for classification: 1) points; 2) goal ratio.
