= 1929–30 Isthmian League =

The 1929–30 season was the 21st in the history of the Isthmian League, an English football competition.

At the end of the previous season Civil Service resigned from the league. They were replaced by Kingstonian, switched from the Athenian League. Nunhead were champions for the second season in a row.

== League table ==
Isthmian League
- Season: 1929–30
- Champions: Nunhead
- Matches: 182
- Goals: 791 (4.35 per match)

Pos	Team	Pld	W	D	L	GF	GA	GR	Pts
1	Nunhead	26	19	3	4	69	36	1.917	41
2	Dulwich Hamlet	26	15	6	5	74	39	1.897	36
3	Kingstonian	26	15	4	7	57	37	1.541	34
4	Ilford	26	16	1	9	84	60	1.400	33
5	Woking	26	11	5	10	66	65	1.015	27
6	Wimbledon	26	11	2	13	64	66	0.970	24
7	Wycombe Wanderers	26	10	4	12	49	52	0.942	24
8	Casuals	26	8	7	11	50	51	0.980	23
9	Oxford City	26	10	3	13	45	60	0.750	23
10	St Albans City	26	9	4	13	54	77	0.701	22
11	Clapton	26	8	4	14	47	57	0.825	20
12	London Caledonians	26	8	3	15	49	69	0.710	19
13	Leytonstone	26	8	3	15	48	68	0.706	19
14	Tufnell Park	26	6	7	13	35	54	0.648	19

Source: fchd.com rsssf.com
Rules for classification: 1) points; 2) goal ratio.
