= 1953–54 Isthmian League =

The 1953–54 season was the 39th season in the history of the English football competition, the Isthmian League.

The Bromley Football Club were the champions, winning their third Isthmian League title.

== League table ==
Isthmian League
- Season: 1953–54
- Champions: Bromley
- Matches: 210
- Goals: 833 (3.97 per match)

Pos	Team	Pld	W	D	L	GF	GA	GR	Pts
1	Bromley	28	18	3	7	76	45	1.689	39
2	Walthamstow Avenue	28	13	7	8	55	30	1.833	33
3	Wycombe Wanderers	28	15	3	10	65	44	1.477	33
4	Ilford	28	11	10	7	48	44	1.091	32
5	Corinthian-Casuals	28	12	7	9	59	44	1.341	31
6	Woking	28	13	4	11	54	58	0.931	30
7	Leytonstone	28	12	5	11	58	48	1.208	29
8	St Albans City	28	11	6	11	54	55	0.982	28
9	Dulwich Hamlet	28	11	6	11	55	57	0.965	28
10	Romford	28	11	5	12	57	54	1.056	27
11	Clapton	28	11	5	12	42	56	0.750	27
12	Barking	28	11	2	15	59	84	0.702	24
13	Kingstonian	28	8	7	13	59	71	0.831	23
14	Wimbledon	28	7	8	13	43	59	0.729	22
15	Oxford City	28	4	6	18	49	84	0.583	14

Source: fchd.com rsssf.com
Rules for classification: 1) points; 2) goal ratio.
