= 1957–58 Isthmian League =

The 1957–58 season was the 43rd in the history of the Isthmian League, an English football competition.

Tooting & Mitcham United were champions, winning their first Isthmian League title.

== League table ==
Isthmian League
- Season: 1957–58
- Champions: Tooting & Mitcham United
- Matches: 240
- Goals: 922 (3.84 per match)

Pos	Team	Pld	W	D	L	GF	GA	GR	Pts
1	Tooting & Mitcham United	30	20	6	4	79	33	2.394	46
2	Wycombe Wanderers	30	19	4	7	78	42	1.857	42
3	Walthamstow Avenue	30	17	5	8	63	35	1.800	39
4	Bromley	30	13	9	8	66	51	1.294	35
5	Oxford City	30	13	6	11	59	48	1.229	32
6	Leytonstone	30	13	6	11	49	48	1.021	32
7	Wimbledon	30	15	2	13	64	66	0.970	32
8	Corinthian-Casuals	30	12	8	10	62	68	0.912	32
9	Woking	30	12	7	11	70	58	1.207	31
10	Barking	30	10	6	14	49	61	0.803	26
11	St Albans City	30	11	3	16	56	76	0.737	25
12	Clapton	30	8	9	13	42	65	0.646	25
13	Kingstonian	30	7	8	15	45	66	0.682	22
14	Dulwich Hamlet	30	7	7	16	49	64	0.766	21
15	Ilford	30	8	4	18	46	70	0.657	20
16	Romford	30	6	8	16	45	71	0.634	20

Source: fchd.com rsssf.com
Rules for classification: 1) points; 2) goal ratio.
