= 1926–27 Isthmian League =

The 1926–27 season was the 18th in the history of the Isthmian League, an English football competition.

St Albans City were champions, winning their second Isthmian League title.

== League table ==
Isthmian League
- Season: 1926–27
- Champions: St Albans City
- Matches: 182
- Goals: 828 (4.55 per match)

Pos	Team	Pld	W	D	L	GF	GA	GR	Pts
1	St Albans City	26	20	1	5	96	34	2.824	41
2	Ilford	26	17	0	9	76	57	1.333	34
3	Wimbledon	26	15	3	8	72	45	1.600	33
4	Nunhead	26	11	8	7	51	33	1.545	30
5	Woking	26	12	6	8	68	60	1.133	30
6	London Caledonians	26	11	7	8	58	47	1.234	29
7	Clapton	26	11	4	11	58	60	0.967	26
8	Leytonstone	26	11	1	14	54	78	0.692	23
9	Dulwich Hamlet	26	9	4	13	60	58	1.034	22
10	Wycombe Wanderers	26	10	2	14	59	86	0.686	22
11	Tufnell Park	26	8	4	14	45	55	0.818	20
12	Oxford City	26	7	5	14	46	72	0.639	19
13	Casuals	26	8	3	15	37	78	0.474	19
14	Civil Service	26	6	4	16	48	65	0.738	16

Source: fchd.com rsssf.com
Rules for classification: 1) points; 2) goal ratio.
