= 1965–66 Isthmian League =

English football league season

The 1965–66 season was the 51st in the history of the Isthmian League, an English football competition.

Leytonstone were champions, winning their ninth Isthmian League title.

== League table ==
Isthmian League
- Season: 1965–66
- Champions: Leytonstone
- Matches: 380
- Goals: 1,443 (3.8 per match)

Pos	Team	Pld	W	D	L	GF	GA	GR	Pts
1	Leytonstone	38	27	7	4	98	33	2.970	61
2	Hendon	38	27	5	6	111	55	2.018	59
3	Enfield	38	24	8	6	104	54	1.926	56
4	Wycombe Wanderers	38	25	6	7	100	65	1.538	56
5	Kingstonian	38	24	5	9	94	55	1.709	53
6	Wealdstone	38	20	6	12	90	64	1.406	46
7	Maidstone United	38	19	6	13	74	61	1.213	44
8	St Albans City	38	19	5	14	57	56	1.018	43
9	Sutton United	38	17	7	14	83	72	1.153	41
10	Tooting & Mitcham United	38	16	7	15	65	58	1.121	39
11	Corinthian-Casuals	38	17	5	16	74	67	1.104	39
12	Woking	38	12	10	16	60	83	0.723	34
13	Walthamstow Avenue	38	12	9	17	81	75	1.080	33
14	Oxford City	38	10	9	19	49	72	0.681	29
15	Barking	38	10	7	21	51	72	0.708	27
16	Bromley	38	10	5	23	69	101	0.683	25
17	Ilford	38	7	10	21	50	84	0.595	24
18	Hitchin Town	38	6	8	24	57	118	0.483	20
19	Clapton	38	5	6	27	46	103	0.447	16
20	Dulwich Hamlet	38	5	5	28	30	95	0.316	15

Source: fchd.com rsssf.com
Rules for classification: 1) points; 2) goal ratio.

=== Stadia and locations ===
Locations of the Isthmian League clubs
Greater London Isthmian League football clubs

Club	Stadium
Barking	Mayesbrook Park
Bromley	Hayes Lane
Clapton	The Old Spotted Dog Ground
Corinthian-Casuals	King George's Field
Dulwich Hamlet	Champion Hill
Enfield	Southbury Road
Hendon	Claremont Road
Hitchin Town	Top Field
Ilford	Victoria Road
Kingstonian	Kingsmeadow
Leytonstone	Granleigh Road
Maidstone United	Gallagher Stadium
Oxford City	Marsh Lane
St Albans City	Clarence Park
Sutton United	Gander Green Lane
Tooting & Mitcham United	Imperial Fields
Walthamstow Avenue	Green Pond Road
Wealdstone	Grosvenor Vale
Woking	The Laithwaite Community Stadium
Wycombe Wanderers	Adams Park
