= 1949–50 Isthmian League =

The 1949–50 season was the 35th in the history of the Isthmian League, an English football competition.

Leytonstone were champions, winning their sixth Isthmian League title. At the end of the season Tufnell Park merged with Edmonton Borough to form Tufnell Park Edmonton.

== League table ==
Isthmian League
- Season: 1949–50
- Champions: Leytonstone
- Matches: 182
- Goals: 753 (4.14 per match)

Pos	Team	Pld	W	D	L	GF	GA	GR	Pts
1	Leytonstone	26	17	5	4	77	31	2.484	39
2	Wimbledon	26	18	2	6	72	51	1.412	38
3	Kingstonian	26	16	3	7	59	39	1.513	35
4	Walthamstow Avenue	26	14	6	6	73	42	1.738	34
5	Dulwich Hamlet	26	14	3	9	60	47	1.277	31
6	St Albans City	26	12	3	11	59	45	1.311	27
7	Woking	26	10	6	10	60	71	0.845	26
8	Wycombe Wanderers	26	9	7	10	51	52	0.981	25
9	Romford	26	10	4	12	45	49	0.918	24
10	Ilford	26	10	4	12	46	53	0.868	24
11	Clapton	26	8	6	12	51	59	0.864	22
12	Oxford City	26	6	6	14	35	54	0.648	18
13	Corinthian-Casuals	26	4	5	17	41	69	0.594	13
14	Tufnell Park	26	3	2	21	24	91	0.264	8

Source: fchd.com rsssf.com
Rules for classification: 1) points; 2) goal ratio.
