= 1950–51 Isthmian League =

The 1950–51 season was the 36th in the history of the Isthmian League, an English football competition.

At the end of the previous season Tufnell Park merged with Edmonton Borough to form Tufnell Park Edmonton. Leytonstone were champions for the second season in a row, winning their seventh Isthmian League title.

== League table ==
Isthmian League
- Season: 1950–51
- Champions: Leytonstone
- Matches: 182
- Goals: 694 (3.81 per match)

Pos	Team	Pld	W	D	L	GF	GA	GR	Pts
1	Leytonstone	26	20	3	3	72	26	2.769	43
2	Walthamstow Avenue	26	15	4	7	57	37	1.541	34
3	Romford	26	15	3	8	58	47	1.234	33
4	Wimbledon	26	13	5	8	58	39	1.487	31
5	Dulwich Hamlet	26	14	2	10	54	43	1.256	30
6	Woking	26	11	6	9	65	55	1.182	28
7	Ilford	26	12	4	10	44	45	0.978	28
8	Corinthian-Casuals	26	13	0	13	62	60	1.033	26
9	St Albans City	26	11	4	11	32	36	0.889	26
10	Kingstonian	26	9	4	13	46	54	0.852	22
11	Wycombe Wanderers	26	8	3	15	46	64	0.719	19
12	Oxford City	26	7	4	15	47	65	0.723	18
13	Clapton	26	6	5	15	29	50	0.580	17
14	Tufnell Park Edmonton	26	4	1	21	24	73	0.329	9

Source: fchd.com rsssf.com
Rules for classification: 1) points; 2) goal ratio.
