= 1947–48 Isthmian League =

The 1947–48 season was the 33rd in the history of the Isthmian League, an English football competition.

Leytonstone were champions for the second season in a row, winning their fifth Isthmian League title.

== League table ==
Isthmian League
- Season: 1947–48
- Champions: Leytonstone
- Matches: 182
- Goals: 776 (4.26 per match)

Pos	Team	Pld	W	D	L	GF	GA	GR	Pts
1	Leytonstone	26	19	1	6	87	38	2.289	39
2	Kingstonian	26	16	6	4	74	39	1.897	38
3	Walthamstow Avenue	26	17	3	6	61	37	1.649	37
4	Dulwich Hamlet	26	17	2	7	71	39	1.821	36
5	Wimbledon	26	13	6	7	66	40	1.650	32
6	Romford	26	14	1	11	53	47	1.128	29
7	Oxford City	26	10	5	11	50	68	0.735	25
8	Woking	26	10	3	13	63	55	1.145	23
9	Ilford	26	7	8	11	51	59	0.864	22
10	St Albans City	26	9	2	15	43	56	0.768	20
11	Wycombe Wanderers	26	7	5	14	51	65	0.785	19
12	Tufnell Park	26	7	4	15	38	83	0.458	18
13	Clapton	26	5	4	17	35	69	0.507	14
14	Corinthian-Casuals	26	5	2	19	33	81	0.407	12

Source: fchd.com rsssf.com
Rules for classification: 1) points; 2) goal ratio.
