= 1937–38 Isthmian League =

The 1937–38 season was the 29th in the history of the Isthmian League, an English football competition.

Leytonstone were champions, winning their second Isthmian League title.

== League table ==
Isthmian League
- Season: 1937–38
- Champions: Leytonstone
- Matches: 182
- Goals: 747 (4.1 per match)

Pos	Team	Pld	W	D	L	GF	GA	GR	Pts
1	Leytonstone	26	17	6	3	72	34	2.118	40
2	Ilford	26	17	3	6	70	39	1.795	37
3	Tufnell Park	26	15	2	9	63	47	1.340	32
4	Nunhead	26	14	3	9	52	44	1.182	31
5	Wycombe Wanderers	26	12	5	9	69	55	1.255	29
6	Dulwich Hamlet	26	13	3	10	57	46	1.239	29
7	Kingstonian	26	12	4	10	51	48	1.063	28
8	Clapton	26	9	6	11	49	53	0.925	24
9	Wimbledon	26	10	3	13	62	49	1.265	23
10	London Caledonians	26	9	4	13	44	55	0.800	22
11	Oxford City	26	7	7	12	35	71	0.493	21
12	Casuals	26	8	3	15	51	74	0.689	19
13	Woking	26	7	2	17	41	72	0.569	16
14	St Albans City	26	4	5	17	31	60	0.517	13

Source: fchd.com rsssf.com
Rules for classification: 1) points; 2) goal ratio.
