= 1951–52 Isthmian League =

The 1951–52 season was the 37th in the history of the Isthmian League, an English football competition.

Leytonstone were champions for the third season in a row, winning their eighth Isthmian League title. At the end of the season Tufnell Park Edmonton resigned from the league and switched to the Spartan League.

== League table ==
Isthmian League
- Season: 1951–52
- Champions: Leytonstone
- Matches: 182
- Goals: 766 (4.21 per match)

Pos	Team	Pld	W	D	L	GF	GA	GR	Pts	Results
1	Leytonstone	26	13	9	4	63	36	1.750	35	
2	Wimbledon	26	16	3	7	65	44	1.477	35	
3	Walthamstow Avenue	26	15	4	7	71	43	1.651	34	
4	Romford	26	14	4	8	61	42	1.452	32	
5	Kingstonian	26	11	7	8	62	48	1.292	29	
6	Wycombe Wanderers	26	12	5	9	64	59	1.085	29	
7	Woking	26	11	5	10	60	71	0.845	27	
8	Dulwich Hamlet	26	11	4	11	60	53	1.132	26	
9	Corinthian-Casuals	26	11	4	11	55	66	0.833	26	
10	St Albans City	26	9	7	10	48	53	0.906	25	
11	Ilford	26	8	5	13	32	47	0.681	21	
12	Clapton	26	9	2	15	50	59	0.847	20	
13	Oxford City	26	6	3	17	50	72	0.694	15	
14	Tufnell Park Edmonton	26	2	6	18	25	73	0.342	10	Left the league to the Spartan League

Source: fchd.com rsssf.com
Rules for classification: 1) points; 2) goal ratio.
