= 1946–47 Isthmian League =

The 1946–47 season was the 32nd in the history of the Isthmian League, an English football competition.

Leytonstone were champions, winning their fourth Isthmian League title.

== League table ==
Isthmian League
- Season: 1946–47
- Champions: Leytonstone
- Matches: 182
- Goals: 832 (4.57 per match)

| Pos | Team | Pld | W | D | L | GF | GA | GR | Pts |
|---|---|---|---|---|---|---|---|---|---|
| 1 | Leytonstone | 26 | 19 | 2 | 5 | 92 | 36 | 2.556 | 40 |
| 2 | Dulwich Hamlet | 26 | 17 | 3 | 6 | 78 | 46 | 1.696 | 37 |
| 3 | Romford | 26 | 13 | 8 | 5 | 76 | 52 | 1.462 | 34 |
| 4 | Walthamstow Avenue | 26 | 13 | 4 | 9 | 64 | 37 | 1.730 | 30 |
| 5 | Oxford City | 26 | 12 | 6 | 8 | 70 | 51 | 1.373 | 30 |
| 6 | Kingstonian | 26 | 12 | 4 | 10 | 52 | 57 | 0.912 | 28 |
| 7 | Wycombe Wanderers | 26 | 9 | 8 | 9 | 63 | 62 | 1.016 | 26 |
| 8 | Wimbledon | 26 | 10 | 5 | 11 | 68 | 64 | 1.063 | 25 |
| 9 | Ilford | 26 | 7 | 7 | 12 | 66 | 78 | 0.846 | 21 |
| 10 | Tufnell Park | 26 | 8 | 5 | 13 | 45 | 69 | 0.652 | 21 |
| 11 | Woking | 26 | 7 | 7 | 12 | 34 | 62 | 0.548 | 21 |
| 12 | Clapton | 26 | 6 | 8 | 12 | 41 | 59 | 0.695 | 20 |
| 13 | St Albans City | 26 | 7 | 5 | 14 | 47 | 79 | 0.595 | 19 |
| 14 | Corinthian-Casuals | 26 | 4 | 4 | 18 | 36 | 80 | 0.450 | 12 |

Source: fchd.com rsssf.com
Rules for classification: 1) points; 2) goal ratio.
