= 1938–39 Isthmian League =

The 1938–39 season was the 30th in the history of the Isthmian League, an English football competition.

Leytonstone were champions for the second time in a row, winning their third Isthmian League title. At the end of the season Casuals merged with Corinthian to form a new club Corinthian-Casuals.

== League table ==
Isthmian League
- Season: 1938–39
- Champions: Leytonstone
- Matches: 182
- Goals: 747 (4.1 per match)

Pos	Team	Pld	W	D	L	GF	GA	GR	Pts	Results
1	Leytonstone	26	18	4	4	68	32	2.125	40	
2	Ilford	26	17	4	5	68	32	2.125	38	
3	Kingstonian	26	17	3	6	62	39	1.590	37	
4	Dulwich Hamlet	26	15	5	6	60	32	1.875	35	
5	Wimbledon	26	14	3	9	88	56	1.571	31	
6	Nunhead	26	11	6	9	54	44	1.227	28	Left league at end of season
7	Casuals	26	11	6	9	54	51	1.059	28	Merged with Corinthian to form Corinthian-Casuals
8	Clapton	26	12	2	12	69	61	1.131	26	
9	Wycombe Wanderers	26	10	6	10	62	62	1.000	26	
10	St Albans City	26	8	5	13	44	50	0.880	21	
11	Woking	26	9	2	15	35	56	0.625	20	
12	Oxford City	26	4	4	18	44	84	0.524	12	
13	Tufnell Park	26	4	4	18	33	87	0.379	12	
14	London Caledonians	26	3	4	19	26	81	0.321	10	Left league at end of season

Source: fchd.com rsssf.com
Rules for classification: 1) points; 2) goal ratio.
