= Isthmian League =

Regional football league in England

- Founded: 8 March 1905; 121 years ago
- Country: England
- Other club from: Jersey
- Number of clubs: 88: Premier Division: 22; North Division: 22; South Central Division: 22; South East Division: 22
- Level on pyramid: Levels 7–8
- Promotion to: National League South
- Relegation to: Combined Counties League North or South; Eastern Counties League; Essex Senior League; Southern Combination League; Southern Counties East League; Spartan South Midlands League; Wessex League
- Domestic cups: FA Cup; FA Trophy; Isthmian League Cup
- Current champions: Folkestone Invicta (Premier Division); Maldon & Tiptree (North Division); Leatherhead (South Central Division); Three Bridges (South East Division); (2025–26 season)
- Website: www.isthmian.co.uk
- Current: 2026–27 season

The Isthmian League (/ˈɪs(θ)miən/) is a regional football league covering Greater London, East and South East England, featuring mostly semi-professional clubs.

Founded in 1905 by amateur clubs in the London area, the league now consists of 88 teams in four divisions: the Premier Division above its three feeder divisions, the North, South Central and South East divisions. Together with the Southern League and the Northern Premier League, it forms the seventh and eighth levels of the English football league system. It has various regional feeder leagues and the league as a whole is a feeder league mainly to the National League South.

== History ==
Before the Isthmian League was formed, there were no leagues in which amateur football clubs could compete, only knock-out cup competitions. Therefore, a meeting took place between representatives of Casuals, Civil Service, Clapton, Ealing Association, Ilford and London Caledonians to discuss the creation of a strong amateur league. All the clubs supported the idea and the Isthmian League was born on 7 March 1905. Membership of the league was through invitation only. The league was very strongly dedicated to the cause of amateurism in sport; consequently, the champions of the league did not even receive a trophy or medals; the league's Latin motto was honor sufficit ('honour is sufficient').

Thus, those clubs less able to compete financially gravitated to it rather than to the Southern League, which attracted clubs with ambition and money. Although the Isthmian League established itself as one of the strongest amateur leagues in the country, routinely providing the winners of the FA Amateur Cup, it was still regarded as being at a lower level than the Southern League, which had developed into the top regional semi-professional league. By 1922 the Isthmian League had fourteen clubs and over the next five decades, only a few new members were admitted, mainly to fill vacancies left by clubs leaving the league. Most new Isthmian League members joined from the Athenian League, which was similarly dedicated to amateurism.

The Isthmian League was most likely named after the ancient Isthmian Games, with the later Athenian League, Corinthian League, Delphian League, Spartan League, Parthenon League and Aetolian League all adding a Classical Greek flavour to amateur football competitions. In 1962 an 'all-star' team from the Isthmian League entered the 1962 Ugandan Independence Tournament, drawing both their games versus the Kenya and the Ghana.

The league finally began to permit professional football statuses in the mid-1970s when the Football Association abolished the long-standing distinction between amateur and professional status with effect from the 1974–75 season. A second division of sixteen clubs was formed in 1973 and a third division followed in 1977. However, the league still remained officious and refused to participate in the formation of the Alliance Premier League in 1979 and whilst two Isthmian League clubs, Enfield and Dagenham, defected to the APL in 1981, it was not until 1985 that the Isthmian League champions were given a promotion place to the newly renamed Football Conference. The reward of promotion into the Conference means that, since 1986, no team has won the league champions title two seasons in succession (as had happened on 22 occasions previously). The Athenian League disbanded in 1984 when the Isthmian League Second Division split into North and South Divisions. These were restructured yet again to Second and Third Divisions in 1991.

In 2002, the league was restructured once more, with the First and Second Divisions merging to become Division One North and Division One South (later renamed simply the North and South divisions), and the Third Division being renamed as Division Two. In addition, the league's three feeder leagues—the Combined Counties League, Essex Senior League and Spartan South Midlands League—ran in parallel with Division Two, and were able to feed directly into the regional Division Ones.

In 2004, The Football Association pushed through a major restructuring of the entire national non-league National League System, creating new regional divisions of the Football Conference feeding into the top, national, level. As a consequence of this restructuring, the Isthmian League was reduced back down to three divisions, and its boundaries were changed to remove the overlap with the Southern League.

In 2006, further reorganisation saw a reversion to two regional Division Ones and the disbandment of Division Two. This current plan calls for clubs based on the edges of the Isthmian League's territory to transfer to and from the Southern League as necessary to maintain numerical balance between the leagues. One team, Clapton, who were ever present in the Isthmian League since its foundation, were moved to the Essex Senior League for the 2006–07 season. Dulwich Hamlet, who had joined the league in 1907, became its longest serving member until their promotion to the National League South for the 2018–19 season.

In May 2017, The Football Association chose the Isthmian League to add a third regional division at Step 4 as part of further restructuring in the National League System, reducing all divisions at Step 4 to 20 teams. The new division started play in the 2018–19 season.

== Current Isthmian League members ==
The league's 2026-27 constitution is as follows:

=== Premier Division ===
- AFC Whyteleafe
- Aveley
- Brentwood Town
- Burgess Hill Town
- Carshalton Athletic
- Chatham Town
- Cheshunt
- Cray Wanderers
- Dartford
- Dulwich Hamlet
- Eastbourne Borough
- Enfield Town
- Leatherhead
- Lewes
- Maldon & Tiptree
- Ramsgate
- St Albans City
- Stanway Rovers
- Three Bridges
- Welling United
- Whitehawk
- Wingate & Finchley

=== North Division ===
- AFC Sudbury
- Bowers & Pitsea
- Brightlingsea Regent
- Buckhurst Hill
- Cambridge City
- Canvey Island
- Concord Rangers
- Fakenham Town
- Felixstowe & Walton United
- Gorleston
- Grays Athletic
- Hashtag United
- Little Oakley
- Lowestoft Town
- Mulbarton Wanderers
- Newmarket Town
- Redbridge
- Takeley
- Tilbury
- Walthamstow
- Witham Town
- Wroxham

=== South Central Division ===
- A.F.C. Portchester
- AFC Stoneham
- Ascot United
- Ashford Town
- Bedfont Sports
- Binfield
- Bognor Regis Town
- Cobham
- Egham Town
- Harrow Borough
- Hartley Wintney
- Hayes & Yeading United
- Hendon
- Jersey Bulls
- Kingstonian
- Littlehampton Town
- Moneyfields
- Raynes Park Vale
- Southall
- Westfield
- Winchester City
- Windsor & Eton

=== South East Division ===
- AFC Croydon Athletic
- Ashford United
- Broadbridge Heath
- Cray Valley Paper Mills
- Crowborough Athletic
- Deal Town
- Eastbourne Town
- Erith Town
- Faversham Town
- Hastings United
- Herne Bay
- Horley Town
- Margate
- Merstham
- Peacehaven & Telscombe
- Punjab United
- Sevenoaks Town
- Sheppey United
- Sittingbourne
- South Park Reigate
- Steyning Town
- Whitstable Town
Locations of the Isthmian League clubs by division
- – Premier Division
- – North Division
- – South Central Division
- – South East Division
Not shown: Jersey Bulls (further south)

== Champions ==
Season	Isthmian League
1905–06	London Caledonians
1906–07	Ilford
1907–08	London Caledonians
1908–09	Bromley
1909–10	Bromley
1910–11	Clapton
1911–12	London Caledonians
1912–13	London Caledonians
1913–14	London Caledonians
1914–19	Not held due to World War I
1919	Leytonstone
1919–20	Dulwich Hamlet
1920–21	Ilford
1921–22	Ilford
1922–23	Clapton
1923–24	St Albans City
1924–25	London Caledonians
1925–26	Dulwich Hamlet
1926–27	St Albans City
1927–28	St Albans City
1928–29	Nunhead
1929–30	Nunhead
1930–31	Wimbledon
1931–32	Wimbledon
1932–33	Dulwich Hamlet
1933–34	Kingstonian
1934–35	Wimbledon
1935–36	Wimbledon
1936–37	Kingstonian
1937–38	Leytonstone
1938–39	Leytonstone
1939–45	Not held due to World War II
1945–46	Walthamstow Avenue
1946–47	Leytonstone
1947–48	Leytonstone
1948–49	Dulwich Hamlet
1949–50	Leytonstone
1950–51	Leytonstone
1951–52	Leytonstone
1952–53	Walthamstow Avenue
1953–54	Bromley
1954–55	Walthamstow Avenue
1955–56	Wycombe Wanderers
1956–57	Wycombe Wanderers
1957–58	Tooting & Mitcham United
1958–59	Wimbledon
1959–60	Tooting & Mitcham United
1960–61	Bromley
1961–62	Wimbledon
1962–63	Wimbledon
1963–64	Wimbledon
1964–65	Hendon
1965–66	Leytonstone
1966–67	Sutton United
1967–68	Enfield
1968–69	Enfield
1969–70	Enfield
1970–71	Wycombe Wanderers
1971–72	Wycombe Wanderers
1972–73	Hendon

For the 1973–74 season, Division Two was added.

Season	Division One	Division Two
1973–74	Wycombe Wanderers	Dagenham
1974–75	Wycombe Wanderers	Staines Town
1975–76	Enfield	Tilbury
1976–77	Enfield	Boreham Wood

For the 1977–78 season, Division One was renamed the Premier Division, Division Two was renamed Division One and new Division Two was added.

Season	Premier Division	Division One	Division Two
1977–78	Enfield	Dulwich Hamlet	Epsom & Ewell
1978–79	Barking	Harrow Borough	Farnborough Town
1979–80	Enfield	Leytonstone/Ilford	Billericay Town
1980–81	Slough Town	Bishop's Stortford	Feltham
1981–82	Leytonstone & Ilford	Wokingham Town	Worthing
1982–83	Wycombe Wanderers	Worthing	Clapton
1983–84	Harrow Borough	Windsor & Eton	Basildon United

For the 1984–85 season, Division Two was reorganised into North and South regions.

Season	Premier Division	Division One	Division Two North	Division Two South
1984–85	Sutton United	Farnborough Town	Leyton Wingate	Grays Athletic
1985–86	Sutton United	St Albans City	Stevenage Borough	Southwick
1986–87	Wycombe Wanderers	Leytonstone/Ilford	Chesham United	Woking
1987–88	Yeovil Town	Marlow	Wivenhoe Town	Chalfont St Peter
1988–89	Leytonstone/Ilford	Staines Town	Harlow Town	Dorking
1989–90	Slough Town	Wivenhoe Town	Heybridge Swifts	Yeading
1990–91	Redbridge Forest	Chesham United	Stevenage Borough	Abingdon Town

For the 1991–92 season, regional divisions Two were merged and Division Three was added.

Season	Premier Division	Division One	Division Two	Division Three
1991–92	Woking	Stevenage Borough	Purfleet	Edgware Town
1992–93	Chesham United	Hitchin Town	Worthing	Aldershot Town
1993–94	Stevenage Borough	Bishop's Stortford	Newbury Town	Bracknell Town
1994–95	Enfield	Boreham Wood	Thame United	Collier Row
1995–96	Hayes	Oxford City	Canvey Island	Horsham
1996–97	Yeovil Town	Chesham United	Collier Row & Romford	Wealdstone
1997–98	Kingstonian	Aldershot Town	Canvey Island	Hemel Hempstead Town
1998–99	Sutton United	Canvey Island	Bedford Town	Ford United
1999–2000	Dagenham & Redbridge	Croydon	Hemel Hempstead Town	East Thurrock United
2000–01	Farnborough Town	Boreham Wood	Tooting & Mitcham United	Arlesey Town
2001–02	Gravesend & Northfleet	Ford United	Lewes	Croydon Athletic

At the end of the 1994–95 season, Enfield were denied promotion to the Conference. Their place was taken by Slough Town who finished as runners-up.

For the 2002–03 season, Division One was reorganised into North and South regions and Division Three was disbanded.

Season	Premier Division	Division One North	Division One South	Division Two
2002–03	Aldershot Town	Northwood	Carshalton Athletic	Cheshunt
2003–04	Canvey Island	Yeading	Lewes	Leighton Town

For the 2004–05 season Division Ones North and South were merged.

Season	Premier Division	Division One	Division Two
2004–05	Yeading	AFC Wimbledon	Ilford
2005–06	Braintree Town	Ramsgate	Ware

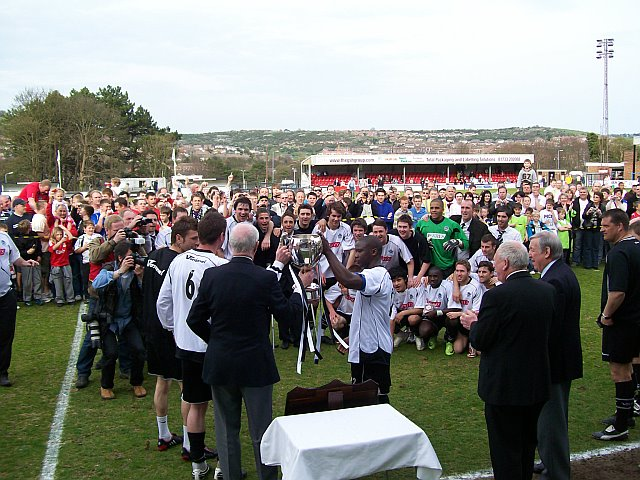
Dover Athletic receive the Isthmian League Premier Division trophy in 2009

For the 2006–07 season, Division One was reorganised into North and South regions and Division Two was disbanded.

Season	Premier Division	North Division	South Division
2006–07	Hampton & Richmond Borough	AFC Hornchurch	Maidstone United
2007–08	Chelmsford City	Dartford	Dover Athletic
2008–09	Dover Athletic	Aveley	Kingstonian
2009–10	Dartford	Lowestoft Town	Croydon Athletic
2010–11	Sutton United	East Thurrock United	Metropolitan Police
2011–12	Billericay Town	Leiston	Whitehawk
2012–13	Whitehawk	Grays Athletic	Dulwich Hamlet
2013–14	Wealdstone	VCD Athletic	Peacehaven & Telscombe
2014–15	Maidstone United	Needham Market	Burgess Hill Town
2015–16	Hampton & Richmond Borough	AFC Sudbury	Folkestone Invicta
2016–17	Havant & Waterlooville	Brightlingsea Regent	Tooting & Mitcham United
2017–18	Billericay Town	AFC Hornchurch	Carshalton Athletic

For the 2018–19 season, the South Division was reorganised into South Central and South East divisions.

Season	Premier Division	North Division	South Central Division	South East Division
2018–19	Dorking Wanderers	Bowers & Pitsea	Hayes & Yeading United	Cray Wanderers
2019–20^{1}	Worthing	Maldon & Tiptree	Ware	Hastings United
2020–21^{2}	Worthing	Tilbury	Waltham Abbey	Hastings United
2021–22	Worthing	Aveley	Bracknell Town	Hastings United
2022–23	Bishop's Stortford	Hashtag United	Basingstoke Town	Chatham Town
2023–24	Hornchurch	Lowestoft Town	Chertsey Town	Cray Valley Paper Mills
2024–25	Horsham	Brentwood Town	Farnham Town	Ramsgate
2025–26	Folkestone Invicta	Maldon & Tiptree	Leatherhead	Three Bridges

^{1} The 2019–20 season was terminated on 26 March 2020 due to the coronavirus pandemic; the teams listed here were in first place in the standings at the time of the termination, but were not recognised as champions.

^{2} The 2020–21 season was also terminated on 24 February 2021 due to the coronavirus pandemic; the teams listed here were in first place in the standings at the time of the termination, but were not recognised as champions.

=== Promoted ===
Since the league's formation in 1905, the following clubs have won promotion to higher levels of the English football league system -

Seasons	Promoted to
1979–1986	Alliance Premier League
1986–2003	Football Conference
2003–2005	Football Conference National
2004–2015	Football Conference North
2004–2015	Football Conference South
2015–present	National League North
2015–present	National League South

Season	Club	Position	Promoted to
1980–81	Enfield; Dagenham	2nd 8th	Alliance Premier League; Alliance Premier League
1984–85	Wycombe Wanderers	3rd	Alliance Premier League
1985–86	Sutton United	1st	Football Conference
1986–87	Wycombe Wanderers	1st	Football Conference
1987–88	Yeovil Town	1st	Football Conference
1988–89	Farnborough Town	2nd	Football Conference
1989–90	Slough Town	1st	Football Conference
1990–91	Redbridge Forest	1st	Football Conference
1991–92	Woking	1st	Football Conference
1993–94	Stevenage Borough	1st	Football Conference
1994–95	Slough Town	2nd	Football Conference
1995–96	Hayes	1st	Football Conference
1996–97	Yeovil Town	1st	Football Conference
1997–98	Kingstonian	1st	Football Conference
1998–99	Sutton United	1st	Football Conference
1999–2000	Dagenham & Redbridge	1st	Football Conference
2000–01	Farnborough Town	1st	Football Conference
2001–02	Gravesend & Northfleet	1st	Football Conference
2002–03	Aldershot Town	1st	Football Conference National
2003–04	Canvey Island; Kettering Town; Sutton United; Thurrock; Hornchurch; Grays Athletic; Carshalton Athletic; Hayes; Bognor Regis Town; Bishop's Stortford; Maidenhead United; Ford United; Basingstoke Town; St Albans City; Lewes (IL DOS)	1st 9th 2nd 3rd 5th 6th 7th 8th 10th 11th 12th 13th 14th* 19th* 1st*	Football Conference National; Football Conference North; Football Conference South; Football Conference South; Football Conference South; Football Conference South; Football Conference South; Football Conference South; Football Conference South; Football Conference South; Football Conference South; Football Conference South; Football Conference South; Football Conference South; Football Conference South
2004–05	Yeading; Eastleigh	1st 3rd*	Football Conference South; Football Conference South
2005–06	Braintree Town; Fisher Athletic	1st 3rd*	Football Conference South; Football Conference South
2006–07	Hampton & Richmond B Bromley	1st 2nd*	Football Conference South; Football Conference South
2007–08	Chelmsford City; AFC Wimbledon	1st 3rd*	Football Conference South; Football Conference South
2008–09	Dover Athletic; Staines Town	1st 2nd*	Football Conference South; Football Conference South
2009–10	Dartford; Boreham Wood	1st 4th*	Football Conference South; Football Conference South
2010–11	Sutton United; Tonbridge Angels	1st 2nd*	Football Conference South; Football Conference South
2011–12	Billericay Town; AFC Hornchurch	1st 2nd*	Football Conference South; Football Conference South
2012–13	Whitehawk; Concord Rangers	1st 4th*	Football Conference South; Football Conference South
2013–14	Wealdstone; Lowestoft Town	1st 4th*	Football Conference South; Football Conference North
2014–15	Maidstone United; Margate	1st 3rd*	National League South; National League South
2015–16	Hampton & Richmond B East Thurrock United	1st 3rd*	National League South; National League South
2016–17	Havant & Waterlooville; Bognor Regis Town	1st 2nd*	National League South; National League South
2017–18	Billericay Town; Dulwich Hamlet	1st 2nd*	National League South; National League South
2018–19	Dorking Wanderers; Tonbridge Angels	1st 4th*	National League South; National League South
2019–20	No promotion to National League North or South		
2020–21	Step 3 promotion cancelled		
2021–22	Worthing; Cheshunt	1st 5th*	National League South; National League South
2022–23	Bishop's Stortford; Aveley	1st 4th*	National League North; National League South
2023–24	Hornchurch; Enfield Town	1st 3rd*	National League South; National League South
2024–25	Horsham; Dover Athletic	1st 5th*	National League South; National League South
2025–26	Folkestone Invicta; Billericay Town	1st 3rd*	National League South; National League South

Asterisk indicates club was promoted via play-offs

=== Sponsorship ===
The Isthmian League was the first league to have sponsorship, having been selected by Rothmans, who sponsored the league from 1973 to 1977. The company offered prize money for position in the league but money was deducted for bookings. Thus the money encouraged both more goals and fair play. The sponsors after Rothmans to the present day have been: Michael Lawrie (1977–78), Berger (1978–1982), Servowarm (1982–1985), Vauxhall-Opel (1985–1990), Vauxhall (1990–91), Diadora (1991–1995), ICIS (1995–1997), Ryman (1997–2017), Bostik (2017–2019) and BetVictor (2019–20). Entain's Pitching In was announced as the next sponsor for 2020–21. At the time of announcement, Entain went by its former name GVC Holdings. Under this partnership, Isthmian is marketed as one of the three Trident Leagues, alongside the Northern Premier and Southern leagues.

Ryman also sponsored the Isthmian Youth League and Isthmian Development League upon their creations in 2007 and 2013 respectively. Ryman chairman Theo Paphitis added to his league sponsorship through his flagship companies. Robert Dyas became sponsors of the Isthmian League Cup, Isthmian Veterans Cup, Isthmian Disability Cup and Isthmian Youth Play-off Cup in 2014, and Boux Avenue sponsored the Isthmian Women's Cup from 2014 to 2017.

Becoming the longest running sports sponsorship in UK football, Ryman stepped down as sponsors at the end of the 2016–17 season after 20 years.

== League Cup ==
The Alan Turvey Trophy, formerly the Isthmian League Cup, has run since 1975 and involves all Isthmian League teams.

== Former members ==
Several previous members of the Isthmian League have reached the English Football League. In its earlier years, the Football League did not directly promote teams from the non-League system on merit, instead holding regular elections, for which any non-League side could apply to enter. In practice, only the most ambitious non-League sides put themselves forward for election, and success was uncommon (outside of divisional expansions, from 1945 to its abolition in 1987, only seven clubs were successful in vying for admission to the League). No Isthmian League member ever put themselves forward for election to the Football League, but Wimbledon were elected as a Southern League member in 1977, having left the Isthmian League 13 years earlier.

The first ex-Isthmian League team to reach the Football League was Wimbledon in 1977, followed subsequently by Maidstone United (1989), Wycombe Wanderers (1993), Yeovil Town (2003), Dagenham & Redbridge (2007), Aldershot Town (2008), Stevenage (2010), AFC Wimbledon (2011), and Sutton United (2021). Bromley became the most recent former member to be promoted to the Football League, winning promotion in 2024.

Team	Isthmian League seasons	Isthmian League Titles	Highest division reached	First season	EFL Honours	Major Cup Honours	Current Division
AFC Wimbledon	2004–08	0	EFL League One	2011–12	none	none	EFL League One
Aldershot Town	1992–2003	1 (2002–03)	EFL League Two	2008–09	none	none	National League
Bromley	1908–1919; 1952–2007	4 (1908–09, 1909–10, 1953–54, 1960–61)	EFL League One	2024–25	League Two: 2025 - 26	none	EFL League One
Dagenham & Redbridge	1907–1992; 1996–2000: 1907–1979 as Ilford; 1908–1979 as Leytonstone; 1945–1988 as Walthamstow Avenue; 1973–1981; 1988–1992 as Dagenham; 1979–1989 as Leytonstone/Ilford; 1989–1991 as Redbridge Forest	19: 1 as Dagenham & Redbridge (1999–2000); 3 as Ilford (1906–07, 1920–21, 1921–22); 9 as Leytonstone (1919, 1937–38, 1938–39, 1946–47, 1947–48, 1949–50, 1950–51, 1951–52, 1965–66); 3 as Walthamstow Avenue (1945–46, 1952–53, 1954–55); 2 as Leytonstone & Ilford (1981–82, 1988–89); 1 as Redbridge Forest (1990–91)	EFL League One	2007–08	none	none	National League South
Maidstone United	1959–71	0	Fourth Division	1989–90	none	none	defunct Successor club Maidstone United currently play in the National League South
Stevenage	1984–1994 as Stevenage Borough	1 (1993–94)	EFL League One	2010–11	none	none	EFL League One
Sutton United	1963–1986; 1991–1999; 2001–2004; 2008–2011	5 (1966–67, 1984–85, 1985–86, 1998–99, 2010–11)	EFL League Two	2021–22	none	none	National League
Wimbledon	1921–1964	8 (1930–31, 1931–32, 1934–35, 1935–36, 1958–59, 1961–62, 1962–63, 1963–64)	Premier League	1977–78	Division 2: 1985–86; Division 3: 1983–84; Division 4: 1982–83	FA Cup: 1987–88	defunct (Note: Wimbledon relocated from south London to Milton Keynes in 2003 before rebranding as Milton Keynes Dons in 2004, but that entity considers itself to have been founded in the latter year and does not lay claim to the history or honours of Wimbledon, including the FA Cup win; nor does AFC Wimbledon, the phoenix club founded in 2002.)
Wycombe Wanderers	1921–1985; 1986–87	8 (1955–56, 1956–57, 1970–71, 1971–72, 1973–74, 1974–75, 1982–83, 1986–87)	EFL Championship	1993–94	none	none	EFL League One
Yeovil Town	1985–1988; 1995–1997	2 (1987–88, 1996–97)	EFL Championship	2003–04	League Two: 2004–05	none	National League

== See also ==
- Northern Premier League
- Southern Football League
