= West Norwood F.C. =

West Norwood
- Full name: West Norwood Football Club
- Nickname: The Bantams
- Founded: 1887
- Dissolved: 1939
- Ground: Raleigh Gardens, Mitcham
- Final season; 1938–39: Surrey Senior League, 11th of 14
Home colours

West Norwood Football Club was a football club based in south London, England.

== History ==
In 1887, Stanley Football Club were formed. A year later, the club renamed to Novices, before renaming themselves as West Norwood in 1889. In the 1906–07 season, the same season the club entered the FA Cup for the first and only time, West Norwood won the London Senior Cup, beating West Hampstead 4–1 in the final. In 1907, West Norwood joined the Isthmian League and also entered a team into the Spartan League, becoming founded members of the latter as a result. During the 1910s, West Norwood embarked on a number of tours, playing Athletic Bilbao in Bilbao twice in May 1913, returning to play the club again in Spain in June 1914. In 1913, West Norwood contested the Meuwsen Beker in the Netherlands for the first time, defeating Cercle Brugge and Ajax to win the tournament. A year later, West Norwood won the competition again, defeating Dutch club GVC 5–1 and Ajax 3–1 in the final.

Following World War I, the club returned to the Isthmian League, performing poorly for four seasons, before joining the Athenian League in 1924. West Norwood again performed poorly in their three-season stint in the Athenian League, never finishing above 11th place out of 14 teams. In 1927, West Norwood joined the Surrey Senior League. West Norwood played eleven seasons in the league, playing their final season in 1938–39. The club did not resurface following World War II.

== Grounds ==
Upon formation, the club played at Streatham Common, before moving to Balham's Hyde Farm. In 1898, the club moved to West Norwood playing at High View. In 1902, West Norwood moved to the Herne Hill Velodrome. Following Crystal Palace's move to the Velodrome in 1915, West Norwood once again moved, playing at Clapham Common until the outbreak of the First World War. Following the war, West Norwood moved to Gorringe Park in Mitcham. After losing the facilities at Gorringe Park, the club played a number of home games at their opponents' grounds, before relocating to Raleigh Gardens in Mitcham.

== Records ==
- Best FA Cup performance: Fifth qualifying round, 1906–07
