= Leytonstone F.C. =

Leytonstone
- Full name: Leytonstone Football Club
- Founded: 1886
- Dissolved: 1979
- Ground: Granleigh Road, Leytonstone
- 1978–79: Isthmian League Premier Division, 21/22
Home colours

Leytonstone F.C. was an English football club based in Leytonstone, Greater London. Founded in 1886, the club ceased to exist in 1979 when it merged with Ilford to form Leytonstone-Ilford, which later became Redbridge Forest after also absorbing Walthamstow Avenue. Redbridge Forest in turn merged with Dagenham to form the modern Dagenham & Redbridge.

== History ==
The club was established in 1886, and were founder members of the Spartan League in 1907. They finished bottom in the league's first season, and switched to the Isthmian League. They won the league in its shortened post-World War I 1919 season, and then twice in 1937–38 and 1938–39. They remained members of the league after World War II and were champions again in 1946–47 and 1947–48. They also won the FA Amateur Cup in both seasons, defeating Wimbledon 2–1 in the 1947 final and Barnet 1–0 in the 1948 final. In 1948–49 they reached the second round of the FA Cup, defeating Watford 2–1 in the first round, before losing 4–3 at home to Newport County. They went on to win three consecutive titles between 1949–50 and 1951–52. In 1951–52 they again reached the second round of the FA Cup after beating Shrewsbury Town 2–0 in the first round, but lost in a second replay to Newport County. Their last Isthmian League title was won in 1965–66, whilst they won the FA Amateur Cup again in 1967–68 Managed by Fred Mann with a 1–0 win over Chesham United F.C. This entitled them to enter the first-ever Coppa Ottorino Barassi, which they won by beating Stefer Roma on away goals.

In 1979 they finished in the bottom two of the Premier Division and were due to be relegated. However, the club instead merged with Ilford to form Leytonstone-Ilford.

== Colours ==
The club's traditional colours were red and white hoops, with black shorts and red and white socks.

== Ground ==
The club played at Granleigh Road near Leytonstone High Road, overseen by the Westbound platform of the Leytonstone High Road Railway station. The ground featured one covered stand and the remaining three sides were for standing. After the local council decided to sell the club's ground for development, the club moved to Walthamstow Avenue's Green Pond Road ground. Shortly afterwards Leytonstone/Ilford merged with Walthamstow, with the new club continuing to play at Green Pond Road.

== F.C. Leytonstone ==
In 2003 an amateur team named F.C Leytonstone was formed. They currently play in the Essex Sunday Football Combination Division 2 League. The club has both adult and youth teams.

== Honours ==
- Coppa Ottorino Barassi
  - Winners: 1967–68
- FA Amateur Cup
  - Winners: 1946–47, 1947–48, 1967–68
- FA Cup
  - Reached Second Round Proper 1947–48, 1961–62
- Isthmian League
  - Champions: 1919, 1937–38, 1938–39, 1946–47, 1947–48, 1949–50, 1950–51, 1951–52, 1965–66
  - Runners-up: 1908–09, 1910–11, 1912–13, 1932–33, 1961–62
- London Senior Cup
  - Winners: 1919–20, 1947–48, 1965–66
- Essex Senior Cup
  - Winners: 1904–05, 1913–14, 1947–48, 1948–49, 1964–65, 1965–66, 1966–67
  - Finalists: 1898–99, 1901–02, 1909–10, 1967–68, 1968–69, 1970–71, 1973–74
- London Charity Cup
  - Winners: 1909–10, 1952–53
- Essex Thamesside Senior Trophy
  - Winners: 1945–46, 1946–47, 1948–49, 1950–51, 1952–53, 1965–66, 1966–67, 1967–68, 1972–73
- Premier Midweek Floodlight League
  - Winners: 1976–77
- Isthmian League – Reserve Section
  - Reserve team: Champions 1935–36, 1949–50, 1950–51, 1951–52, 1952–53
  - Reserve team: Runners-up 1920–21, 1969–70
- London Intermediate Cup
  - Reserve team: Winners 1948–49, 1956–57, 1961–62
  - Reserve team: Finalists 1953–54
- London Junior Cup
  - Winners: 1893–94
  - Reserve team: Winners 1900–01
- Essex Intermediate Cup
  - Reserve team: Finalists 1950–51, 1951–52
- Full International Players
  - England: Albert F. Barrett (also played for England Amateur)
- Amateur International Players – (1947–1974)
  - England: D.J. Andrews (5 appearances), George Bunce (4), [G.]J. Charles (3), Ernie Childs (6), P. Diwell (2), E.G. Fright (4), Ken Gray (28), D.J. Griffin (3), Vic Groves (2), B.G. Harvey (12), Doug H. Jarvis (12), Leon Joseph (12), Jack J.M. Kavanagh (2), B. Moffatt (9), Alf W. Noble (18), Jim S. Paviour (5), Les Tilley (11), L.J. Wallis (4)
  - Other nations: T. Owen, D. Roberts
- Essex County FA – Players gaining honours badge for 10 or more representative appearances, cap for 6 or more matches, or badge for 3 or more matches (2 or more at junior level)
  - Seniors: honours badge – J.E. Payne, J.R.T. Groves, J.J.M. Kavana[gh], A.W. Nicholls, F.W. Smith, L. Joseph, A.W. Noble, D. Griffin, R. Cudmore, R. Hill, R. Wood, D.J. Andrews, K. Gray, J. Charles; cap – W.S. Moad, C. Fairweather, H.J. Pearce, J. Smith, H.E. Bloyce, G.H.J. Bunce, J.S. Paviour, R. Vale, C. Hockaday, L.J. Wallis, F. Newman, B. Moffatt; badge – E.R. Skiller, W. Counden, W. Conjuit, E. Ball, W. Church, E. Owers, A.J. Seaton, W.T. Reneville, S.F. Kennerley, G.D. Hardie, C.C. Brown, H.J. Marley, J. Wood, H. Wilson, D.R. Jarvis, J. Wastell, F. Flavell, P. Diwell, M. Thompson, J. Albon, S. Lucas
  - Juniors: honours badge – G.S.K. Hiom, J. Oliver; cap – W. Picken; badge – T. Coombes, K.M. Pomeroy, A. Wildman, J. Allen
