= List of Wycombe Wanderers F.C. managers =

Wycombe Wanderers Football Club is an English association football club, based in the town of High Wycombe, Buckinghamshire. The club was founded in 1887, and competes in League One during the 2025–26 season.

For the first 82 years of their existence, Wycombe Wanderers didn't employ a manager, with the team being selected by the captain at the time. James McCormick was the first coach to be appointed in 1951 but it wasn't until Brian Lee took the reins in 1969 that the club had a recognised manager.

Following the sacking of Gary Waddock, Gareth Ainsworth was appointed as Wycombe Wanderers's caretaker-manager on 24 September 2012. Since 2013, he has been Wycombe's permanent manager until February 2023. Former Wycombe Player Matt Bloomfield became Wycombe's manager around the same time as Gareth's departure and led Wycombe to a EFL Trophy Final and a strong campaign in 2024-25 until January 2025 when he left for Luton Town. Since September 2025, Wycombe now operate under a Head Coach system for the first time with former Sunderland Assistant Manager Mike Dodds however due to poor performance, he was sacked on 18 September 2025 and on the same day, hired former Huddersfield Town Manager Michael Duff.

== Managers ==
Names of caretaker managers are supplied where known, and periods of caretaker-management are highlighted in italics. Win percentage is rounded to two decimal places.

Statistics are correct as of 21 August 2025.

Key

M: Matches played W: Matches won D: Matches drawn L: Matches lost

Name	Nation	From	To	M	W	D	L	Win %	Honours and achievements	Notes
James McCormick	England	1 August 1951	31 July 1952	0	0	0	0	—	—	
Sid Cann	England	1 August 1952	31 July 1961	6	1	0	5	16.67	Isthmian League champions: 1955–56 & 1956–57; Berks & Bucks Senior Cup champions: 1953–54, 1957–58 & 1959–60	
Graham Adams	England	1 August 1961	31 July 1962	2	0	1	1	0.00	Berks & Bucks Senior Cup runners-up: 1961–62	
Don Welsh	England	1 August 1962	31 July 1964	2	1	0	1	50.00	Berks & Bucks Senior Cup champions: 1963–64	
Barry Darvill	England	1 August 1964	31 July 1968	5	0	3	2	0.00	Berks & Bucks Senior Cup champions: 1967–68	
Manager during 1968–69 season unknown
Brian Lee	England	1 August 1969	31 July 1976	13	4	5	4	30.77	Isthmian League champions: 1970–71 & 1971–72; Isthmian League Division One champions^{A} : 1973–74 & 1974–75; Berks & Bucks Senior Cup champions: 1972–73, 1973–74 & 1974–75; Anglo–Italian Semipro. Cup champions: 1975–76	
Ted Powell	England	1 August 1976	31 July 1977	2	1	0	1	50.00	Isthmian League Division One runners-up: 1976–77	
John Reardon	England	1 August 1977	31 July 1978	1	0	0	1	0.00	Berks & Bucks Senior Cup champions: 1977–78	
Andy Williams	England	1 August 1978	31 July 1980	2	0	0	2	0.00	Berks & Bucks Senior Cup champions: 1978–79	
Mike Keen	England	1 August 1980	31 July 1984	7	1	2	4	14.29	Isthmian League Premier Division champions^{B} : 1982–83; Isthmian Charity Shield champions: 1983–84 Isthmian League Cup runners-up: 1981–82, 1982–83 & 1983–84; Berks & Bucks Senior Cup runners-up: 1981–82	
Paul Bence	England	1 August 1984	31 July 1986	3	2	0	1	66.67	Promoted to Alliance Premier League (3rd place in Isthmian League Premier Division): 1984–85; Isthmian League Cup champions: 1984–85; Isthmian Charity Shield champions: 1985–86	
Alan Gane	England	1 August 1986	31 July 1987	0	0	0	0	—	Isthmian League Premier Division champions (promoted to Conference): 1986–87; Berks & Bucks Senior Cup champions: 1986–87	
Peter Suddaby	England	1 August 1987	31 July 1988	0	0	0	0	—	Isthmian Charity Shield champions: 1987–88	
Jim Kelman	Scotland	1 August 1988	31 July 1990	0	0	0	0	—	Berks & Bucks Senior Cup champions: 1989–90	
Martin O'Neill	Northern Ireland	1 August 1990	13 June 1995	112	52	32	28	46.43	Conference champions (promoted to Football League Third Division): 1992–93; Football League Third Division playoff winners (promoted to Football League Second Division): 1993–94; FA Trophy champions: 1990–91 & 1992–93; Conference Championship Shield champions: 1991–92, 1992–93 & 1993–94; Berks & Bucks Senior Cup champions: 1991–92	
Alan Smith	England	29 June 1995	31 July 1996	52	16	17	19	30.77	—	
Neil Smillie	England	1 August 1996	22 October 1996	No stats available					—	
John Gregory	England	22 October 1996	25 February 1998	76	25	23	28	32.89	—	
Neil Smillie	England	25 February 1998	11 January 1999	47	13	15	19	27.7	—	
Terry Evans	England	11 January 1999	5 February 1999	2	0	0	2	0.00	—	
Lawrie Sanchez	Northern Ireland	5 February 1999	30 September 2003	256	87	71	98	33.98	FA Cup semi-finalists: 2000–01	
John Gorman	Scotland	2 October 2003	5 November 2003	8	2	3	3	25.00	—	
Tony Adams	England	5 November 2003	9 November 2004	53	12	21	20	22.64	—	
Keith Ryan	England	15 November 2004	30 November 2004	3	2	0	1	66.67	—	
John Gorman	Scotland	30 November 2004	5 June 2006	83	30	27	26	36.14	—	
Paul Lambert	Scotland	30 June 2006	30 May 2008	108	44	29	35	40.74	Football League Cup semi-finalists: 2006–07	
Peter Taylor	England	30 May 2008	9 October 2009	63	22	22	19	34.92	Promoted to League One (3rd place in League Two): 2008–09	
Gary Waddock	Republic of Ireland	13 October 2009	23 September 2012	147	47	39	61	31.97	Promoted to League One (3rd place in League Two): 2010–11	
Gareth Ainsworth	England	24 September 2012	21 February 2023	550	219	137	194	39.82	Promoted to League One (3rd place in League Two): 2017–18; League One play-off winners (promoted to Championship): 2019–20; Highest league finish (22nd in Championship): 2020–21	
Matt Bloomfield	England	21 February 2023	14 January 2025	108	52	24	32	48.15	—	
Sam Grace	England	15 January 2025	4 February 2025	4	2	2	0	50.00	—	
Mike Dodds	England	2 February 2025	18 September 2025	31	9	9	13	29.03	—	
Michael Duff	Northern Ireland	18 September 2025	Present	2	1	0	1	50.00	—	

== Footnotes ==
A. By the 1973–74 season, the Isthmian League had split into two divisions: Division One and Division Two.
B. By the 1977–78 season, the Isthmian League had split into three divisions: Premier Division, Division One and Division Two.
