= Brian Lee (football manager) =

British football manager (1936–2023)

Brian Lee MBE
Personal information
- Birth name: Brian Russell Lee
- Date of birth: 28 February 1936
- Place of birth: Sale, Cheshire, England
- Date of death: 12 February 2023 (aged 86)
- Place of death: Slough, Berkshire, England

Managerial career
- Years: Team
- 1968–1976: Wycombe Wanderers

Brian Russell Lee MBE (28 February 1936 – 12 February 2023) was a British football manager, coach, and administrator, most notable for his associations with Wycombe Wanderers and Bisham Abbey. He was appointed a Member of the Order of the British Empire (MBE) in the 2016 New Year Honours for services to football, and a Services to Football Award by the League Managers Association (LMA) in 2016.

== Early life and education ==
Born in Sale, Cheshire, Brian Lee was a successful sportsman at Sale Grammar School, captaining the school rugby team and representing the county. After leaving school he joined Altrincham and later Port Vale, but decided not to pursue a career as a professional footballer following a serious toe injury.

== Coaching and managerial career ==
Lee took up coaching instead, and at the age of 18 became the youngest F.A. Staff Coach in England. At 24 he became Assistant Warden at Lilleshall, and was later involved with the England Youth Team. In 1967 he was appointed Director of Bisham Abbey and also coach to Oxford University.

In December 1968 he was appointed manager of Wycombe Wanderers following the resignation of Barry Darvill, and remained there until 1976. During his tenure, Wycombe won the Isthmian League Championship four times, and were runners up twice. They were Amateur Cup semi-finalists in 1972, and won the Anglo-Italian Semi-Professional Trophy against A.C. Monza. He also managed the first England semi-professional team against Italy.

== Post-coaching career ==
After retiring from Wycombe Wanderers in 1976, Lee worked on the development of Bisham Abbey as a Centre of Excellence. He was appointed Vice-Chairman of Wycombe Wanderers and then founder Chairman of the Company in 1980. He was instrumental in forming the club into a Limited Company by Guarantee and was overseer of the move from Loakes Park to Adams Park. After the move he reverted to Board Director.

Lee was also on the committees of the Norfolk F.A, Shropshire F.A, a founder member of the Isthmian League Management Committee, Vice-Chairman of the GM Vauxhall Conference and a magistrate in High Wycombe.

== Death ==
Lee died in hospital in the early hours of 12 February 2023, at the age of 86. His son, Bryn confirmed his death, saying that his father had suffered a heart attack whilst sleeping and doctors were unable to resuscitate him.

Lee had been due to attend Wycombe Wanderers' home game versus Derby County the previous day, but was instead admitted to Wexham Park Hospital, feeling unwell.
