= Mark Philo =

English footballer (1984–2006)

Personal information
- Full name: Mark William Philo
- Date of birth: 5 October 1984
- Place of birth: Bracknell, England
- Date of death: 14 January 2006 (aged 21)
- Place of death: Reading, England
- Position: Midfielder

Youth career
- West Ham United
- Crystal Palace
- 1999–2003: Wycombe Wanderers

Senior career*
| Years | Team | Apps | (Gls) |
| 2003–2006 | Wycombe Wanderers | 17 | (0) |
- * Club domestic league appearances and goals

Mark William Philo (5 October 1984 – 14 January 2006) was an English professional footballer. He spent his whole professional career at Wycombe Wanderers making 19 first-team appearances. He died on 14 January 2006 following a road traffic collision. An inquiry into the crash, which also resulted in the death of the driver of another car, found that it was caused by Philo driving whilst intoxicated by alcohol.

== Career ==
Philo was born in Bracknell, Berkshire, and joined Wycombe at the age of 15, having been on the books of both West Ham United and Crystal Palace. He made his debut for the Wycombe first team in February 2004 under Tony Adams and signed a contract until the summer of 2005, which was extended to June 2007 by John Gorman. He played a total of 19 matches for the club's first team.

Philo suffered two broken ankles in consecutive years, the first being a broken right ankle and then a hairline fracture to his left leg in a pre-season game before the 2005/06 season.

== Death ==
Philo died on 14 January 2006 after sustaining serious head injuries in a road traffic collision. A Vauxhall Astra being driven by Philo collided head on with a Renault Mégane at the junction of Sandhurst Road and Finchampstead Road in Wokingham, Berkshire, at about 01:20. The driver of the Megane, 58-year-old Patricia Gammon, was declared dead at the scene. Philo was taken to Royal Berkshire Hospital in Reading, but died from his injuries later that day.

Wycombe manager John Gorman paid tribute to him by saying, "He was a fantastic kid. He lived for football and always had a smile on his face." The Wycombe players held up a banner for Philo after their League Cup game against Chelsea at Adams Park.

=== Inquiry ===
Police investigations revealed that Philo was significantly over the drink-drive limit at the time of the accident. He had been drinking with two friends in the Golden Retriever pub in Wokingham, from 20:30 until closing time. Philo and his friends then drove off to look for another bar and ended up at The Gig House, where they stayed drinking for another hour. It was estimated that by the time the group left that venue, Philo had consumed six or seven pints of lager. According to an eyewitness, Philo was travelling above the speed limit when he veered onto the wrong side of the road and into Gammon's Megane and then a telegraph pole, where he suffered horrific injuries resulting in his death 15 hours later. Gammon, a mother of two, was killed instantly.

PC Andrew Bryant, the collision investigation officer, confirmed that Philo's car was on the wrong side of the road when the crash happened. He said: "The blame for this collision appears to lie with the driver of the Vauxhall Astra. Excess alcohol and driving over the centre of the road were contributing factors. As soon as you exceed the alcohol limit your ability to drive is significantly impaired."
