= 1970–71 Isthmian League =

The 1970–71 season was the 56th in the history of the Isthmian League, an English football competition.

Wycombe Wanderers were champions, winning their third Isthmian League title. At the end of the season Maidstone United and Wealdstone switched to the Southern Football League.

== League table ==
Isthmian League
- Season: 1970–71
- Champions: Wycombe Wanderers
- Matches: 380
- Goals: 1,156 (3.04 per match)

Pos	Team	Pld	W	D	L	GF	GA	GR	Pts	Results
1	Wycombe Wanderers	38	28	6	4	93	32	2.906	62	
2	Sutton United	38	29	3	6	76	35	2.171	61	
3	St Albans City	38	23	10	5	87	26	3.346	56	
4	Enfield	38	24	7	7	67	24	2.792	55	
5	Ilford	38	21	7	10	74	51	1.451	49	
6	Hendon	38	18	11	9	81	37	2.189	47	
7	Barking	38	20	4	14	89	59	1.508	44	
8	Leytonstone	38	17	10	11	68	50	1.360	44	
9	Woking	38	18	6	14	57	50	1.140	42	
10	Walthamstow Avenue	38	14	11	13	63	52	1.212	39	
11	Oxford City	38	13	10	15	51	48	1.063	36	
12	Hitchin Town	38	12	9	17	46	60	0.767	33	
13	Wealdstone	38	12	8	18	45	64	0.703	32	Switched to the SFL Division One North
14	Tooting & Mitcham United	38	11	9	18	44	66	0.667	31	
15	Kingstonian	38	11	8	19	53	71	0.746	30	
16	Bromley	38	10	6	22	34	77	0.442	26	
17	Dulwich Hamlet	38	7	10	21	30	66	0.455	24	
18	Maidstone United	38	7	6	25	42	84	0.500	20	Switched to the SFL Division One South
19	Clapton	38	5	7	26	33	101	0.327	17	
20	Corinthian-Casuals	38	2	8	28	23	103	0.223	12	

Source: fchd.com rsssf.com
Rules for classification: 1) points; 2) goal ratio.

=== Stadia and locations ===
Locations of the Isthmian League clubs
Greater London Isthmian League football clubs

Club	Stadium
Barking	Mayesbrook Park
Bromley	Hayes Lane
Clapton	The Old Spotted Dog Ground
Corinthian-Casuals	King George's Field
Dulwich Hamlet	Champion Hill
Enfield	Southbury Road
Hendon	Claremont Road
Hitchin Town	Top Field
Ilford	Victoria Road
Kingstonian	Kingsmeadow
Leytonstone	Granleigh Road
Maidstone United	Gallagher Stadium
Oxford City	Marsh Lane
St Albans City	Clarence Park
Sutton United	Gander Green Lane
Tooting & Mitcham United	Imperial Fields
Walthamstow Avenue	Green Pond Road
Wealdstone	Grosvenor Vale
Woking	The Laithwaite Community Stadium
Wycombe Wanderers	Adams Park
