= Alan Turvey Trophy =

Football tournament in England

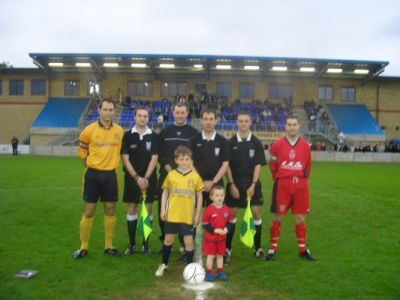
- Slough Town vs Hampton & Richmond Borough in the 2005 final
- Founded: 1975; 51 years ago
- Region: England
- Current champions: Wingate & Finchley (2nd title)
- Most championships: Sutton United (4 titles)
- Website: Isthmian League Website

The Alan Turvey Trophy, also known as the Velocity Cup under a sponsorship deal, formerly the Isthmian League Cup, is a football knock-out cup competition organised by the Isthmian League in England.

== History ==
Isthmian League Chairman and President Alan Turvey was among the FA's "150 Grassroots Heroes" who were presented in 2013, during the 150-year celebrations of the Football Association, with a specially minted medal by Prince William. In June 2015, Turvey stepped down from the League after nearly 60 years involvement with football. The Isthmian League cup was renamed in his honour. In 2024 the competition was named the Velocity Cup under a sponsorship deal.

== Finals ==
This section lists every final of the competition played since 1974–75, the winners, the runners-up, and the result.

=== Key ===
Match went to extra time

Season	Winners	Result	Runner-up	Venue	Att.	Notes
1974–75	Tilbury	3–1 (Agg.)	Croydon			1st Leg: 2–1. 2nd Leg: 1–0.
1975–76	Slough Town	4–0	Tilbury	Church Road		
1976–77	Hendon	1–0	Barking	Earlsmead		
1977–78	Dagenham	1–0	Leatherhead	Champion Hill	804	
1978–79	Enfield	2–1	Hayes	Wrexham Park		
1979–80	Enfield	3–2	Sutton United	Earlsmead		
1980–81	Slough Town	4–2	Walthamstow Avenue	Church Road	>1,000	
1981–82	Leytonstone & Ilford	2–0	Kingstonian	Meadow Park		
1982–83	Sutton United	2–1 (Agg.)	Wycombe Wanderers	1st Leg: Loakes Park. 2nd Leg: Gander Green Lane.	1st Leg: 842. 2nd Leg: unknown.	1st Leg: 1–0. 2nd Leg: 1–1.
1983–84	Sutton United	3–1 (Agg.)	Wycombe Wanderers	1st Leg: Loakes Park. 2nd Leg: Gander Green Lane.	1st Leg: 597. 2nd Leg: 897.	1st Leg: 1–1. 2nd Leg: 2–0.
1984–85	Wycombe Wanderers	5–1 (Agg.)	Farnborough Town	1st Leg: Cherrywood Road. 2nd Leg: Loakes Park.	1st Leg: 824. 2nd Leg: 1,228.	1st Leg: 3–0. 2nd Leg: 2–1.
1985–86	Sutton United	3–1	Uxbridge	Imber Court	1,052	
1986–87	Bognor Regis Town	3–2	Hendon	Camrose Ground		
1987–88	Yeovil Town	3–1	Hayes	Church Road	2,471	
1988–89	Bishop's Stortford	1–0	Farnborough Town		826	
1989–90	Aveley	3–0	St Albans City	Victoria Road	1,036	
1990–91	Woking	2–1	Carshalton Athletic	Kingsmeadow	2,992	
1991–92	Grays Athletic	3–1	Enfield	Victoria Road	1,264	
1992–93	Marlow	2–1	Molesey	Recreation Ground	944	
1993–94	Chertsey Town	3–0	Enfield	Church Road	1,021	
1994–95	Aylesbury United	1–1	Slough Town	A.D. Memorial Ground	1,108	After extra-time.
1995–96	Kingstonian	4–1	Aldershot Town	Recreation Ground	3,511	
1996–97	Boreham Wood	1–0	Braintree Town	Victoria Road	473	After extra-time.
1997–98	Sutton United	6–1	Oxford City	Earlsmead	433	
1998–99	Aldershot Town	2–1	Boreham Wood	Wrexham Park	1,061	After extra-time.
1999–2000	Farnborough Town	1–0	Maidenhead United	Camrose Ground	701	After extra-time.
2000–01	Heybridge Swifts	3–0	Croydon	Ship Lane	318	
2001–02	Northwood	3–2	Hampton & Richmond Borough	Clarence Park	262	After extra-time.
2002–03	Yeading	2–0	Canvey Island	Bridge Avenue	701	
2003–04	Thurrock	5–1	Dunstable Town	Woodside Park	333	
2004–05	Slough Town	3–1	Hampton & Richmond Borough	Wheatsheaf Park	725	
2005–06	Fisher Athletic	4–0	Billericay Town	New Recreation Ground	611	
2006–07	Ashford Town (Middlesex)	4–1	Dover Athletic	Hayes Lane	462	
2007–08	Ramsgate	0–0	A.F.C. Sudbury	Princes Park	568	After extra-time.
2008–09	Tilbury	2–0	Harrow Borough	Wheatsheaf Park	284	
2009–10	Leatherhead	0–0	Wealdstone	Imber Court	668	
2010–11	Wingate & Finchley	2–0	Dulwich Hamlet	Imber Court	502	
2011–12	Bury Town	1–0	East Thurrock United	Wheatsheaf Park	313	
2012–13	Concord Rangers	3–2	Dulwich Hamlet	Gallagher Stadium	466	After extra-time.
2013–14	Maidstone United	3–0	A.F.C. Sudbury	Gallagher Stadium	1,829	
2014–15	Hendon	3–2	Grays Athletic	Church Road	379	
2015–16	Kingstonian	5–0	Faversham Town	Colston Avenue	488	
2016–17	Billericay Town	8–3	Tonbridge Angels	Colston Avenue	653	
2017–18	Billericay Town	5–3	Metropolitan Police	Parkside	626	After extra-time.
2018–19	Enfield Town	2–0	Hornchurch	Parkside	617	
2019–2021	No competition due to COVID-19 pandemic.					
2021–22	Horsham	4–0	Margate	Parkside	809	
2022–23	Aveley	3–0	Potters Bar Town	Parkside	547	
2023–24	Chatham Town	2–1	Hashtag United	Parkside	767	
2024–25	Billericay Town	3–2	Chatham Town	Parkside	1,268	
2025–26	Wingate & Finchley	1–0	Ramsgate	Parkside	1,166	After extra-time.

=== Results by teams ===
Club	Wins	First final won	Last final won	Runner-up	Last final lost	Total final apps.	Nots
Sutton United	4	1982–83	1997–98	1	1979–80	5	
Billericay Town	3	2016–17	2024–25	1	2005–06	4	
Slough Town	3	1975–76	2004–05	1	1994–95	4	
Enfield	2	1978–79	1979–80	2	1993–94	5	
Hendon	2	1976–77	2014–15	1	1986–87	3	
Kingstonian	2	1995–96	2015–16	1	1981–82	3	
Tilbury	2	1974–75	2008–09	1	1975–76	3	
Aveley	2	1989–90	2022–23	0	–	2	
Wingate & Finchley	2	2010–11	2025–26	0	–	2	
Farnborough	1	1999–2000	1999–2000	2	1988–89	3	(Note: Won 2 titles as Farnborough Town.)
Wycombe Wanderers	1	1984–85	1984–85	2	1983–84	3	
Aldershot Town	1	1998–98	1998–98	1	1995–95	2	
Boreham Wood	1	1996–97	1996–97	1	1998–99	2	
Chatham Town	1	2023–24	2023–24	1	2024-25	2	
Grays Athletic	1	1991–92	1991–92	1	2014–15	2	
Leatherhead	1	2009–10	2009–10	1	1977–78	2	
Ramsgate	1	2007–08	2007–08	1	2025–26	2	
Ashford Town (Middlesex)	1	2006–07	2006–07	0	–	1	
Aylesbury United	1	1994–95	1994–95	0	–	1	
Bishop's Stortford	1	1988–89	1988–89	0	–	1	
Bognor Regis Town	1	1986–87	1986–87	0	–	1	
Bury Town	1	2011–12	2011–12	0	–	1	
Chertsey Town	1	1993–94	1993–94	0	–	1	
Concord Rangers	1	2012–13	2012–13	0	–	1	
Dagenham †	1	1977–78	1977–78	0	–	1	(Note: Dissolved in 1992. Merged with Leytonstone & Ilford to form Dagenham & Redbridge.)
Enfield Town	1	2018–19	2018–19	0	–	1	
Fisher Athletic †	1	2005–06	2005–06	0	–	1	(Note: Dissolved in 2009.)
Heybridge Swifts	1	2000–01	2000–01	0	–	1	
Horsham	1	2021–22	2021–22	0	–	1	
Leytonstone & Ilford †	1	1981-82	1981-82	0	–	1	(Note: Dissolved in 1992. Merged with Dagenham to form Dagenham & Redbridge.)
Maidstone United	1	2013–14	2013–14	0	–	1	
Marlow	1	1992–93	1992–93	0	–	1	
Northwood	1	2001–02	2001–02	0	–	1	
Thurrock †	1	2003–04	2003–04	0	–	1	(Note: Dissolved in 2018.)
Woking	1	1990–91	1990–91	0	–	1	
Yeading †	1	2002–03	2002–03	0	–	1	(Note: Dissolved in 2007.)
Yeovil Town	1	1987–88	1987–88	0	–	1	
A.F.C. Sudbury	0	–	–	2	2013–14	2	
Croydon	0	–	–	2	2000–01	2	
Dulwich Hamlet	0	–	–	2	2012–13	2	
Hampton & Richmond Borough	0	–	–	2	2004–05	2	
Hayes †	0	–	–	2	1987–88	2	(Note: Dissolved in 2007.)
Barking	0	–	–	1	1976–77	1	
Braintree Town	0	–	–	1	1996–97	1	
Canvey Island	0	–	–	1	2002–03	1	
Carshalton Athletic	0	–	–	1	1990–91	1	
Dover Athletic	0	–	–	1	2006–07	1	
Dunstable Town	0	–	–	1	2003–04	1	
East Thurrock United †	0	–	–	1	2011–12	1	(Note: Dissolved in 2023.)
Faversham Town	0	–	–	1	2015–16	1	
Harrow Borough	0	–	–	1	2008–09	1	
Hashtag United	0	–	–	1	2023–24	1	
Hornchurch	0	–	–	1	2018–19	1	
Maidenhead United	0	–	–	1	1999–2000	1	
Margate	0	–	–	1	2021–22	1	
Metropolitan Police	0	–	–	1	2017–18	1	
Molesey	0	–	–	1	1992–93	1	
Oxford City	0	–	–	1	1997–98	1	
Potters Bar Town	0	–	–	1	2022–23	1	
St Albans City	0	–	–	1	1989–90	1	
Tonbridge Angels	0	–	–	1	2016–17	1	
Uxbridge	0	–	–	1	1985–86	1	
Walthamstow Avenue †	0	–	–	1	1980–81	1	(Note: Dissolved in 1988. Merged with Leytonstone & Ilfrod.)
Wealdstone	0	–	–	1	2009–10	1	
