= Wycombe Wanderers F.C. =

Association football club in Buckinghamshire, England

Wycombe Wanderers
- Full name: Wycombe Wanderers Football Club
- Nicknames: The Chairboys; The Blues
- Founded: 1887; 139 years ago
- Ground: Adams Park
- Capacity: 9,558 (but currently reduced to about 8,828 because of safety issues)
- Owner(s): Blue Ocean Partners II Limited 80% Wycombe Wanderers Supporters Trust 10% Dan Rice 10%
- Chairman: Dan Rice
- Head Coach: Tom Hounsell
- League: EFL League One
- 2025–26: EFL League One, 11th of 24
- Website: wwfc.com
Home colours	Away colours	Third colours

Wycombe Wanderers Football Club (/ˈwɪkəm/) is a professional association football club based in the town of High Wycombe, Buckinghamshire, England. The team competes in League One, the third level of the English football league system.

Founded in 1887, they entered the Southern League in 1896. They switched to the Great Western Suburban League in 1908 and then the Spartan League in 1919, before joining the Isthmian League after winning the Spartan League in 1919–20 and 1920–21. They spent 64 years in the Isthmian League, winning eight league titles and one FA Amateur Cup title. Having rejected numerous invitations to join the Alliance Premier League (now National League), they finally accepted an offer in 1985 and eventually found success in the fifth tier of English football under the management of Martin O'Neill, winning promotion into the Football League as Football Conference champions in 1992–93. They also lifted the FA Trophy in 1991 and 1993, and won the Conference League Cup, Conference Shield (three times) and Conference Charity Shield.

Despite never making it to the EFL Championship before 2020, the team has had successes throughout their history. Wycombe made an immediate impact in the Football League, winning promotion out of the Third Division via the play-offs in 1994. They spent a decade in the third tier and reached the FA Cup semi-finals in 2001, though were relegated three years later. They also reached the League Cup semi-finals in 2007 and then gained promotion out of League Two in 2008–09. This was the first of four successive seasons of promotions and relegations between League Two and League One, which was followed by a decline that saw the club only avoid relegation into non-League on goal difference in 2014. The club secured promotion out of League Two in 2017–18 under the stewardship of Gareth Ainsworth, who then took the club to the Championship for the first time in the club's history with victory in the 2020 League One play-off final. However, they would be relegated in their first season in the Championship. They play their home matches at Adams Park, located on the western outskirts of High Wycombe.

== History ==
=== Formation and early years (1887–1921) ===
The exact details of the formation of Wycombe Wanderers F.C. have largely been lost to history. A group of young furniture trade workers started a team to play matches which led to a meeting, held at the Steam Engine public house in Station Road, High Wycombe in 1887 which saw the formation of Wycombe Wanderers F.C. It is highly likely the club was named Wanderers after the famous Wanderers, winners of the first FA Cup in 1872. The club played friendly matches between 1887 and 1896. It first entered the FA Amateur Cup in 1894 and the FA Cup in 1895. In 1895 the club moved to Loakes Park, which would become its home for the next 95 years. In 1896 the club joined the Southern League and competed in the Second Division until 1908.

In the summer of 1908 the club declined the invitation to retain their membership of the Southern League. The club decided to pursue amateur instead of professional football and joined the Great Western Suburban League and remained there until the outbreak of the First World War. After the hostilities had ended the club joined the Spartan League in 1919 and were Champions in successive years. In March 1921 the club's application to join the Isthmian League was accepted.

=== Amateur years (1921–1974) ===
The club remained a member of the Isthmian League until 1985, when they finally accepted promotion to the Alliance Premier League. For over sixty years the Wanderers sought to be the greatest amateur club in the country. One of the club's greatest achievements came in April 1931 when it won the FA Amateur Cup. The Wanderers beat Hayes 1–0 in the final at Highbury, home of Arsenal. The club also reached the first round proper of the FA Cup for the first time in November 1932, losing to Gillingham in a replay at Loakes Park.

The club remained active during the Second World War, competing in the Great Western Combination, which was won in 1945. In 1947 Frank Adams, who had captained the club to its double Championship victories in the Spartan League and made 331 appearances for the Wanderers, scoring 104 goals, made arguably his greatest contribution when he gave Loakes Park to the club. It provided the basis for a period of unprecedented success in 1950s.

The club appointed Sid Cann as coach in 1952 and he led the Wanderers to their first Isthmian League title in 1956. The title was successfully defended the following season, and the club also reached Wembley for the first time in their history. They were beaten 3–1 by Bishop Auckland in the final of the FA Amateur Cup in April 1957. Their North-East rivals were something of a nemesis having also beaten the Chairboys at the semi-final stage in both 1950 and 1955. The second round proper of the FA Cup was reached in December 1959 when the club was defeated 5–1 by Watford at Vicarage Road. The stars of the team included winger Len Worley and striker Paul Bates.

Cann left the club to join Norwich City in 1961 and the club's fortunes took something of a downturn during the 1960s. That changed in December 1968 when Brian Lee was appointed as the club's first conventional manager. He changed several aspects of the club including team selection, which up to that point had been chosen by committee. He led the Wanderers to a third Isthmian League title in 1971 and it was again defended successfully in 1972. The club suffered yet more FA Amateur Cup disappointment at the semi-final stage, losing 2–1 to Hendon at Griffin Park, Brentford.

A fifth Isthmian League title was won in 1974 and the following season it was defended yet again, this time by the narrowest of margins, a superior goal difference of 0–1 to Enfield. In the same season the club created history by reaching the third round proper of the FA Cup for the first time, losing 1–0 to First Division Middlesbrough in a replay at Ayresome Park having drawn 0–0 at Loakes Park.

=== Loss of purpose (1974–1984) ===
Lee retired as manager in 1976 and again the Wanderers suffered a decline. A significant factor was the abolition of amateur football by the FA in 1974 which left the club without a sense of purpose. The Wanderers rejected the invitation to join the Alliance Premier League on its formation in 1979 and again in 1981 with concern over the increased travelling costs. The club reached the semi-finals of the FA Trophy for the first time in 1982 but lost out to Altrincham. A seventh Isthmian League title was won in 1983 but promotion to the Alliance Premier League was again turned down.

=== Football League dream (1984–1993) ===
Yearly performance chart since joining the Conference.

As a consequence crowds at Loakes Park dropped to record lows and the club decided to accept promotion to the Gola League in 1985, having finished third in the Isthmian League Premier Division. The club's first season in a national league ended in disappointment, with the Wanderers relegated on goal difference. They soon returned after romping to an eighth Isthmian League title in 1987 after a battle with Yeovil Town. The club consolidated their place in the newly named GM Vauxhall Conference and under manager Jim Kelman they finished in fourth place in 1989. The following season would be the club's last at their Loakes Park home. It was a disappointing season on the field with Kelman being asked to resign following a defeat to the Metropolitan Police in the FA Trophy.

The club appointed Martin O'Neill as his successor and he went on to lead the Wanderers to unprecedented success. The club moved to its new Adams Park home in 1990, and in May 1991, the Blues defeated Kidderminster Harriers 2–1 in the final of the FA Trophy in front of a then-record crowd. The club narrowly missed out on promotion to the Football League the following season, finishing level on 94 points with Colchester United, but placing second in the league on goal difference.

=== Football League (1993–2000) ===
The club recovered to become only the third in history to win the non-league double. Wycombe claimed the 1992–93 Conference title before winning the FA Trophy again, defeating Runcorn 4–1 in the final at Wembley in May 1993. O'Neill rejected the chance to manage Nottingham Forest that summer, staying with Wycombe to lead the club to fourth in the Third Division and qualify for the play-offs in their inaugural season in the Football League. They beat Carlisle United in the two-legged semi-final, and defeated Preston North End 4–2 in the final at Wembley in May 1994 to secure their second consecutive promotion, entering the Second Division (the third tier) for the first time in the club's history.

In their first season in the Second Division, Wycombe finished sixth, but due to league re-organisation, missed out on a play-off place, and O'Neill left to become manager of First Division Norwich City in June 1995. Former Crystal Palace manager Alan Smith was appointed as his successor, but was dismissed in September 1996 as Wycombe struggled in the bottom half of the Second Division. John Gregory took over and managed to steer the club to safety on the penultimate weekend of the 1996–97 season. He left to manage Aston Villa in February 1998 and youth team boss Neil Smillie was appointed as his successor.

Smillie was dismissed in January 1999 with Wycombe looking destined for relegation back to the fourth tier. Lawrie Sanchez was appointed his successor and tasked with keeping the club in the Second Division. Safety was secured on the final day of the season when Paul Emblen headed home the winner seven minutes from time to beat Lincoln City 1–0. In tribute to this result, the club acquired a new mascot, in the form of the Wycombe Comanche.

=== Cup success and relegation (2000–2006) ===
In 2000–01, Wycombe began a successful FA Cup run, with wins over First Division sides Grimsby Town, Wolverhampton Wanderers and Wimbledon taking them to a quarter-final with Premiership outfit Leicester City. Striker Roy Essandoh headed an injury-time winner to seal a 2–1 win for the Wanderers at Filbert Street. The semi-final at Villa Park saw Wycombe face Liverpool, and goals from Emile Heskey and Robbie Fowler put the Premiership side up 2–0. A last ditch effort from club mainstay Keith Ryan gave some hope to the Wanderers, but they would exit the competition after succumbing to a 2–1 defeat.

Despite cup success, the club's league form continued to struggle, as they finished 13th in the Second Division in 00–01. As bottom half finishes continued, Sanchez was eventually dismissed in September 2003 after the club ended the previous campaign in 18th. His successor Tony Adams was unable to improve the club's situation, and Wycombe ended a 10-year stay in the Second Division at the end of 03–04, finishing bottom of the league and suffering relegation to the Third Division, then renamed as the Coca-Cola League Two. At the time, the Wanderers were English football's last professional members' club, but at an extraordinary general meeting in July 2004, the members voted by a narrow margin to restructure the club as a Public Limited Company. Chairman Ivor Beeks, Director Brian Kane and sponsor Steve Hayes all subsequently invested in the club, with an approximate total value of £750,000.

Adams remained in the manager's job for just a year, resigning in November 2004, and John Gorman was appointed as his successor. His tenure saw a record of 21 league games unbeaten at the start of the 2005–06 season. A double tragedy would soon hit the club, however, with midfielder Mark Philo killed in a road accident in January 2006 and Gorman's wife Myra dying of cancer in March. Subsequently, the team's form slipped and they fell from top spot to eventually finish in sixth place, still achieving a playoff spot. Cheltenham Town won the two-legged play-off semi-final 2–1 and Gorman was dismissed in May 2006.

Paul Lambert took over in June, and took the club on another ambitious cup run, this time to the semi-finals of the Carling Cup. Having previously never passed the second round, Wycombe defeated Fulham away, and knocked out then Premier League side Charlton Athletic in the quarter-finals. This bought them to a semi-final with reigning Premier League champions Chelsea. The Wanderers drew the first leg 1–1 at Adams Park, with Jermaine Easter scoring a late equaliser after a first half goal from Wayne Bridge. In the second leg at Stamford Bridge, doubles from both Andriy Shevchenko and Frank Lampard saw Wycombe lose 4–0 and exit the competition. Again, however, the side's league form would suffer, and a number of changes were made to the squad and staff in the summer of 2007. They reached the League Two play-offs in 2008 but were knocked out 2–1 on aggregate by Stockport County. Lambert resigned shortly afterwards.

=== Yo-yoing between the lower divisions (2006–2012) ===
Peter Taylor was appointed as his successor in May 2008 and he led the side to another lengthy unbeaten start which lasted 18 games. The side was nine points clear at the top at Christmas but results soon tailed off and the team eventually finished in the last automatic promotion place, ahead of Bury by virtue of a superior goal difference of just one. The summer of 2009 saw Steve Hayes become the first sole owner of the club, converting £3m of loans into equity. He also announced his intention to move the club into a community stadium based on the site of the Wycombe Air Park.

Taylor was sacked in October 2009 after a poor start to the season, and was replaced by Gary Waddock who was unable to save the club from relegation back to League Two. Waddock did however guide the Wanderers straight back to League One at the first attempt. He led the side to a third-place finish, and achieved a points total of 80, the highest the club had recorded since its promotion to the Football League. In July 2011, after much argument and debate, Wycombe District Council announced that work on the community stadium proposed at Wycombe Air Park would stop. Wycombe were relegated back to League Two at the end of the 2011–12 season.

=== Wycombe Wanderers Trust ownership and recent success (2012–present) ===
On 30 June 2012, the supporters-owned Wycombe Wanderers Trust formally took over the club. This financial stabilisation ended a transfer embargo. Gary Waddock took advantage of this immediately and signed several new players for the 2012–13 season. The season also included their 125th anniversary, and the shirt design was an adaptation of their first-ever kit, in Oxford and Cambridge blue halves (instead of quarters). On 22 September, Waddock was dismissed as manager with immediate effect with the club above the relegation zone. Former club captain Gareth Ainsworth was immediately named as the caretaker manager in Waddock's absence before later earning the role permanently. Ainsworth revitalised the squad and the club as a whole and steered Wycombe safely away from the relegation threat, eventually ending the season in 15th place, nine points clear of relegation.

At the start of the final day of the 2013–14 season, Wycombe were three points adrift of safety in the relegation zone of League Two. However, after a 3–0 win away at Torquay United, and Bristol Rovers losing to Mansfield Town, Wycombe finished in 22nd place, above Bristol on goal difference, to remain in the Football League. Following the near-relegation of the previous season, Gareth Ainsworth released seven players from the club to start a rebuild of the squad. The 2014–15 season saw the club spend the majority of the season in the automatic promotion places. However, two costly home defeats to Morecambe and local rivals Oxford United led to a finishing position of fourth, setting up a play-off fixture against Plymouth Argyle. The play-off final took place on 23 May against Southend United. After a goalless draw during normal time, Wycombe scored four minutes into extra time. Southend continued to put pressure on Wycombe until Joe Pigott scored in the 122nd minute to tie the game at 1–1. Southend won the subsequent penalty shoot out 7–6.

In the 2017–18 season, Exeter and Notts County both losing respectively combined with Wycombe winning their penultimate game of the season ensured promotion to League One. In the 2019–20 season, Wycombe finished third in League One on points per game due to the impact of Covid-19. They won the play-off semi final 6–3 on aggregate, against Fleetwood Town, then, on 13 July defeated Oxford United 2–1 in the final, at an empty Wembley Stadium, to ensure that Wycombe would play in the EFL Championship for the first time in the club's history.

The following 2020–21 season saw all but three of the 46 league matches being played behind closed doors due to the continuing pandemic. Wycombe struggled in the early stages, failing to register a point in their first seven league outings, and failing to score in their first four. An improved run of form, which included back-to-back wins against Sheffield Wednesday and Birmingham City, lifted Wycombe to 22nd in the table, but three successive defeats in December saw the club drop to bottom position on the Saturday before Christmas. In a fourth round FA Cup tie at home to Tottenham Hotspur, Wycombe took the lead through Fred Onyedinma in the first half, before the Premier League club found their form to win the tie 4–1. Still bottom of the table going into the Easter period, Wycombe's fortunes then began to turn around significantly, and they still had a theoretical outside chance of survival going into the final game away at Middlesbrough. A 3–0 win was not enough, but results elsewhere meant that Wycombe finished the season in 22nd place with 43 points, 16 of which had been gained from the final eight games. The club was therefore relegated back to League One, but only by a margin of one point and an inferior goal difference to Derby County. After Derby County, previously accused of breaching financial fair play regulations, went into administration in September 2021, Wycombe considered legal action to recoup potential losses of up to £20m.

Gareth Ainsworth departed for Queens Park Rangers in February 2023. The club quickly sought a replacement in former Wycombe club captain Matt Bloomfield from Colchester United. Ainsworth's departure marked the end of 10 years at the club which included of a period of unprecedented success for the club. During his time he took the club from the bottom of League Two to the Championship for the first time in their history.

In the 2023–24 season, Wycombe reached the EFL Trophy final for the first time in the club's history. In the final, Wycombe lost 2–1 to Peterborough United. Following the conclusion of the season, the club announced that ownership of Feliciana EFL Ltd, the company owning 90% of the club, had transferred to Blue Ocean Partners II Ltd, owned by Kazakh-Georgian billionaire Mikheil Lomtadze.

Wycombe went on a 19-game unbeaten league run early in the 2024–25 season which also included eight straight wins. With the club sitting second place in the league, Matt Bloomfield left the club on 14 January 2025 to take up the vacant managerial post at Luton Town. Bloomfield was replaced by former Sunderland assistant manager Mike Dodds. The club missed out on automatic promotion and subsequently lost in the play-off semi-finals to Charlton Athletic. A poor start to the 2025–26 season then saw Dodds leave the club on 18 September 2025, along with first-team coach Pete Shuttleworth. Dodds was replaced by the former Huddersfield Town head coach Michael Duff. On 8 September 2026, Duff and first-team coach Alex Morris were dismissed after a start to the season that yielded no wins in the first five league games.

== League history ==
- 1896–97 – Joined Southern League Division Two.
- 1908–09 – Joined Great Western Suburban League.
- 1919–20 – Joined Spartan League.
- 1921–22 – Joined Isthmian League after two successive Spartan League titles.
- 1930–31 – FA Amateur Cup Winners.
- 1953–54 – Missed runner-up spot in Isthmian League on goal average.
- 1955–56 – Isthmian League Champions.
- 1956–57 – Isthmian League Champions (2nd time); FA Amateur Cup runner-up.
- 1957–58 – Isthmian League runner-up.
- 1959–60 – Isthmian League runner-up.
- 1969–70 – Isthmian League runner-up.
- 1970–71 – Isthmian League Champions (3rd time).
- 1971–72 – Isthmian League Champions (4th time).
- 1973–74 – Isthmian League Champions (5th time).
- 1974–75 – Isthmian League Champions (6th time) (on goal average).
- 1975–76 – Isthmian League runner-up. Winner of the Anglo-Italian Semiprofessional Cup
- 1976–77 – Isthmian League runner-up.
- 1978–79 – Rejected invitation to join the Alliance Premier League.
- 1980–81 – Rejected invitation to join the Alliance Premier League.
- 1981–82 – FA Trophy semi-finalists.
- 1982–83 – Isthmian League Champions (7th time) rejected promotion to the Alliance Premier League.
- 1985–86 – Joined Alliance Premier League, relegated after one season.
- 1986–87 – Rejoined Isthmian League; Isthmian League Champions (8th time).
- 1987–88 – Rejoined Conference (ex-Alliance Premier League).
- 1990–91 – FA Trophy Winners.
- 1991–92 – Conference runner-up (missed title and promotion to Football League on goal difference).
- 1992–93 – Conference Champions; FA Trophy Winners (2nd time); Promoted to Football League Division Three.
- 1993–94 – Promoted to Division Two after play-offs (Final – Wycombe Wanderers 4 Preston North End 2 at Wembley Stadium).
- 2000–01 – FA Cup semi-finalists.
- 2003–04 – Relegated to Division Three, which was then renamed "League Two".
- 2005–06 – Not promoted after play-offs (SF Wycombe Wanderers 1 Cheltenham Town 2, Cheltenham Town 0 Wycombe Wanderers 0 – Aggregate 1–2).
- 2006–07 – League Cup semi-finalists, beating Premiership Charlton Athletic and Fulham away from home, and finally falling 5–1 to Champions Chelsea on aggregate, following a 1–1 draw at Adams Park.
- 2007–08 – Not promoted after play-offs (SF Wycombe Wanderers 1 Stockport County 1, Stockport County 1 Wycombe Wanderers 0 – Aggregate 1–2).
- 2008–09 – Promoted to League One after finishing in third place (above fourth-placed Bury on goal difference by a single goal).
- 2009–10 – Relegated to League Two.
- 2009–10 – Football League Family Excellence Award.
- 2010–11 – Promoted to League One after finishing in third place (above fourth-placed Shrewsbury Town by one point).
- 2011–12 – Relegated to League Two.
- 2011–12 – Football League Family Excellence Award.
- 2013–14 – Escaped relegation to Conference on goal difference.
- 2014–15 – Not promoted after play-offs (SF Plymouth Argyle 2 Wycombe Wanderers 3, Wycombe Wanderers 2 Plymouth Argyle 1 – Aggregate 5–3, F Southend United 1 Wycombe Wanderers 1 at Wembley Stadium, Southend United won 7–6 on penalties).
- 2017–18 – Promoted to League One a week before their final game against Stevenage after winning against Chesterfield combined with losses for both Exeter City and Notts County in the two places immediately below them.
- 2019–20 – Promoted to Championship after play-offs (Final – Oxford United 1 Wycombe Wanderers 2 at Wembley Stadium).
- 2020–21 – Relegated to League One.
- 2021–22 – Not promoted after play-offs (SF Wycombe Wanderers 2 Milton Keynes Dons 0, Milton Keynes Dons 1 Wycombe Wanderers 0 – Aggregate 2–1, F Sunderland 2 Wycombe Wanderers 0 at Wembley Stadium).
- 2023–24 – EFL Trophy Finalists (vs Peterborough United)

Source: Wycombe Wanderers at the Football Club History Database

== Facilities ==
=== Stadium ===
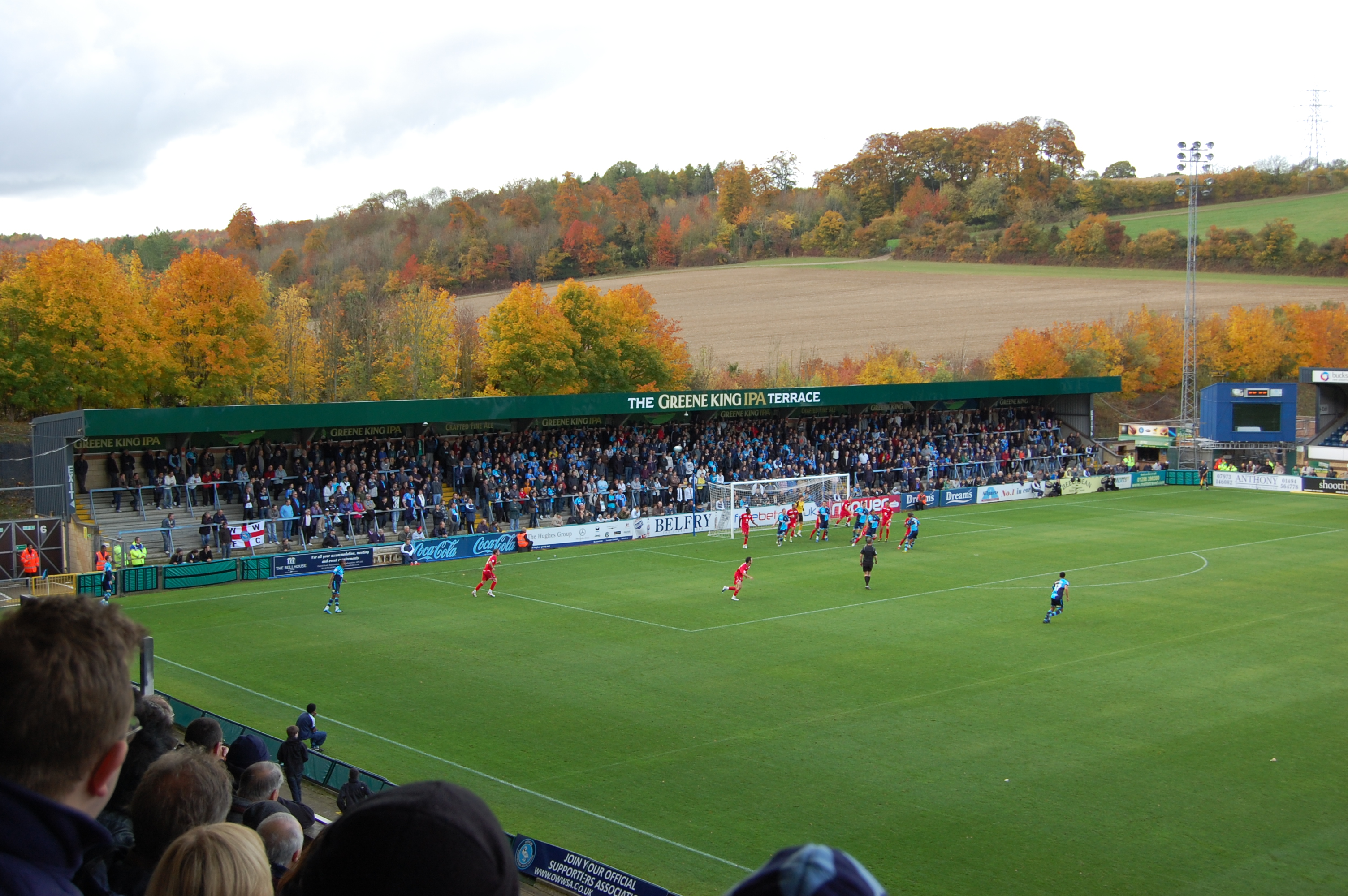
Valley Terrace at Adams Park

Wycombe's stadium is known as Adams Park, and is located on the edge of an industrial estate in the Sands area of High Wycombe. The stadium was named in honour of benefactor and former captain Frank Adams. The club has played at the stadium since 1990; the move from its previous ground Loakes Park was financed almost solely by the sale of Loakes Park to the health authorities in order to facilitate the expansion of Wycombe Hospital.

During the 2003–04 and 2004–05 seasons, the stadium was known as "The Causeway Stadium" for sponsorship reasons.

The stadium has a current capacity of 9,558 (currently reduced to about 8,828) with four stands. The original seated Main Stand (Origin Stand) is on the north side of the stadium, with a capacity of 1,248. The largest stand in the stadium is the Woodlands Stand on the south side of the ground, which was built in 1996, replacing a covered terrace. It has three tiers; the upper tier is known as the Frank Adams Stand (like the stadium, named after former captain Frank Adams), with a capacity of 2,842; the middle tier contains 20 executive boxes, plus the Woodlands Lounge, and has a capacity of 360; the lower tier is the Family Stand, with a capacity of 1,777. The stand therefore has a total capacity of 4,979. At one end of the Family Stand are 60 so-called "2020" seats, which can be used by both seated and standing spectators. The away section of the stadium, on the east side, is the Hillbottom Stand (WhiffAway Stand) with a usable capacity of 1,866 (although the physical seating capacity is actually 2,057). This stand was rebuilt in 2001, almost doubling its previous size. The stadium also has one terrace, on the west side, which is the Valley Terrace (Thames Air and Water Tech Terrace). This is the home supporters' end, with a capacity of 1,430, however this figure has been reduced to 700 because of the closure of the rear section as a result of issues raised during a safety inspection. In addition, there are 35 places in the stadium not accounted for above.

The main supporters' bars at the stadium are the Woodlands Lounge, the Caledonian Suite (formerly the Vere Suite), and Monty's (formerly the Centre Spot, then Scores). The new club shop was built in 2006, replacing the portable buildings that previously served as the shop; it was reconfigured in 2015 along with the main reception area, and again in 2020.

Wycombe Wanderers also shared the stadium with Aviva Premiership Rugby Union team Wasps (then known as London Wasps) between 2002 and 2014.

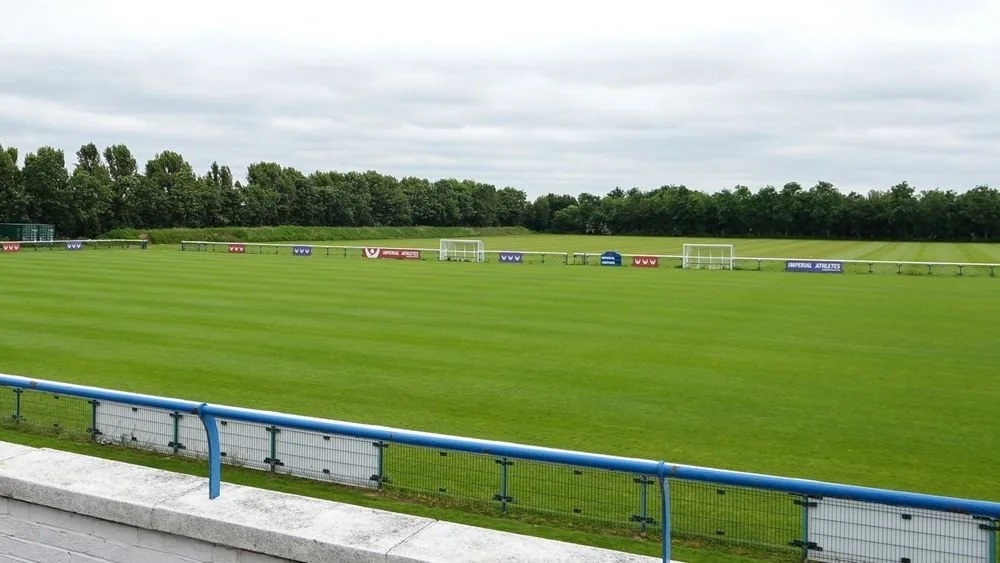
Harlington Training Ground

=== Training ground ===
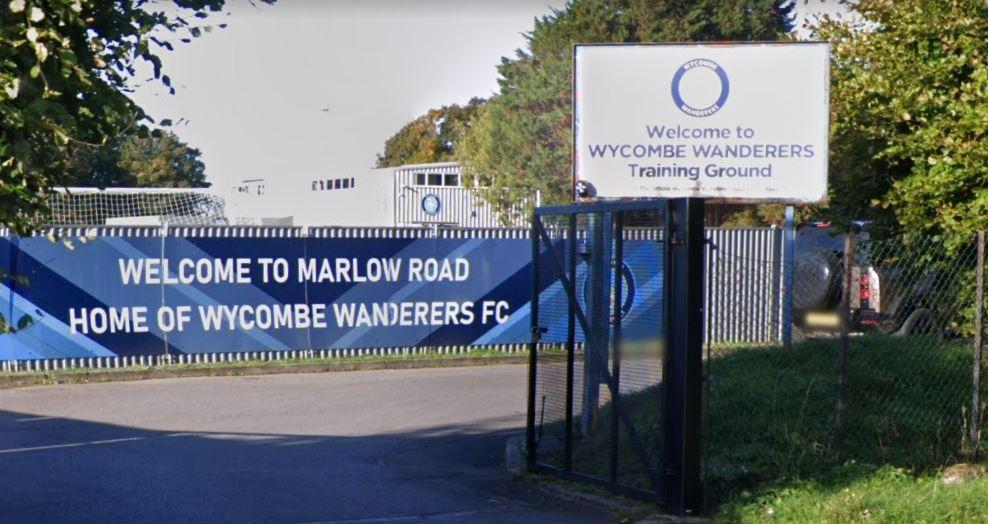
Marlow Road Training Ground

Wycombe have two training facilities in use.

Marlow Road in High Wycombe. Wycombe sold Marlow Road in March 2013 and leased it back. Over the Summer of 2025, Wycombe invested £10m into redeveloping Marlow Road.

Harlington Sport Ground at Harlington, in West London, the former training ground of QPR and Chelsea and currently owned by Imperial College of London. On 10 June 2024, Wycombe agreed to lease the ground to rebuild its academy and the use for the first team.

== Rivalries ==
As a non-league club, Slough Town were considered Wycombe's fiercest local rivals. A rivalry with the more distant Colchester United also exists due to the two clubs battling to win promotion to the Football League in the early 1990s, which recently got more traction due to Wycombe's Matt Bloomfield starting his managerial career at Colchester, then moving to Wycombe mid-season, this despite the two teams not being in the same league since 2018. Since becoming a Football League club, the Chairboys have also built on and off rivalries with neighbouring clubs Oxford United (M40 Derby), Reading, Milton Keynes Dons (Buckinghamshire Derby), Luton Town, the rivalry with Reading gaining more traction due to Wycombe's enquiry on Reading's current training ground, Bearwood Park, coming one week after Wycombe beat Reading 2–1 in March 2024, with Reading fans protesting at Adams Park a few days after.

They also had a small yet well-documented rivalry with Plymouth Argyle, which stemmed from Plymouth's former manager Derek Adams having a vocal dislike for Wycombe which is outlined in a photo of him rejecting a handshake from Gareth Ainsworth. It was ignited in the 2015 League Two play-offs and flared up in January 2016, where Barry Richardson, who was 46 years old at the time, played a professional game for the first time since 2005, coming on for an injured Alex Lynch and keeping a clean sheet, prompting the Plymouth Argyle Twitter Admin to respond negatively to the playing style, with most Wycombe fans proclaiming 30 January 2016 as "Barry Richardson Day"

== Attendances ==
The club's average home league attendances since 1980–81 (* = approximate figure, ^ = season curtailed due to the COVID-19 pandemic (18 home games), ¬ = limited spectator attendance due to the COVID-19 pandemic (2 home games)).
Averages have been calculated from referenced sources.

Season	Average
1980–81	845*
1981–82	680
1982–83	675*
1983–84	535
1984–85	530
1985–86	775
1986–87	1,130
1987–88	1,460
1988–89	2,248
1989–90	1,890

Season	Average
1990–91	2,800
1991–92	3,606
1992–93	4,602
1993–94	5,470
1994–95	5,844
1995–96	4,580
1996–97	5,228
1997–98	5,414
1998–99	5,121
1999–00	5,101

Season	Average
2000–01	5,549
2001–02	6,621
2002–03	6,002
2003–04	5,256
2004–05	4,937
2005–06	5,445
2006–07	4,983
2007–08	4,746
2008–09	5,109
2009–10	5,544

Season	Average
2010–11	4,547
2011–12	4,853
2012–13	3,721
2013–14	3,681
2014–15	4,044
2015–16	3,984
2016–17	3,913
2017–18	4,705
2018–19	5,342
2019–20	5,521^

Season	Average
2020–21	1,500¬
2021–22	5,662
2022–23	5,727
2023–24	4,980
2024–25	5,362
2025–26	5,550

== Players ==
As of 19 November 2026

=== Current senior squad ===
Note: Flags indicate national team as defined under FIFA eligibility rules; some limited exceptions apply. Players may hold more than one non-FIFA nationality.

No.	Pos.	Nation	Player
1	GK	NED	Mikki van Sas
2	DF	SCO	Jack Grimmer (captain)
3	DF	SCO	Daniel Harvie
4	MF	ENG	Josh Scowen
5	MF	ENG	Aaron Morley
7	MF	GBS	Armando Junior Quitirna
8	MF	NIR	Caolan Boyd-Munce
10	MF	ENG	Luke Leahy
11	FW	ENG	Silko Thomas
12	FW	ENG	Cauley Woodrow
15	FW	ENG	Jayden Wareham
17	DF	IRL	Dan Casey
19	FW	ENG	Emre Tezgel (on loan from Stoke City)
20	MF	SCO	Ewan Henderson

No.	Pos.	Nation	Player
21	MF	IRL	Jamie Mullins
22	DF	WAL	Sam Parker (on loan from Swansea City)
23	GK	NIR	Conor Hazard
24	GK	ENG	Matt Macey
26	DF	ENG	Connor Taylor
27	DF	ENG	Steve Cook
28	FW	ENG	Danny Ings
29	FW	JAM	Malik Mothersille (on loan from Stockport County)
30	MF	ENG	Joseph McCallum
31	GK	ENG	Stuart Moore
33	GK	ENG	Joe Wildsmith
44	FW	NGR	Fred Onyedinma
45	DF	DEN	Anders Hagelskjær

=== Out on loan ===
Note: Flags indicate national team as defined under FIFA eligibility rules; some limited exceptions apply. Players may hold more than one non-FIFA nationality.

No.	Pos.	Nation	Player
6	DF	ENG	Taylor Allen (at Salford City until the end of the 2026-27 season)
9	FW	SUI	Bradley Fink (at Dundee until the end of the 2026-27 season)
18	FW	ENG	James Berry (at Forest Green Rovers until the end of the 2026-27 season)

No.	Pos.	Nation	Player
25	DF	ENG	Declan Skura (at Walsall until the end of the 2026-27 season)
34	DF	ENG	Jack Matton (at Aldershot Town until the end of the 2026-27 season)
51	MF	SCO	Alex Lowry (at Motherwell until the end of the 2026-27 season)

=== Retired numbers ===
Note: Flags indicate national team as defined under FIFA eligibility rules; some limited exceptions apply. Players may hold more than one non-FIFA nationality.

No.	Pos.	Nation	Player
14	MF	ENG	Mark Philo (posthumous)

=== Professional Development Phase squad ===
Note: Flags indicate national team as defined under FIFA eligibility rules; some limited exceptions apply. Players may hold more than one non-FIFA nationality.

No.	Pos.	Nation	Player
38	FW	ENG	Jahrel McKoy
41	GK	ENG	Kyle Defraine
47	MF	ENG	Kaylan Hemmings
52	GK		Max Collins
53	GK	NGR	Israel Jegede
54	GK	USA	Sam Keller
56	DF	ENG	Tyrone Mlotshwa
57	DF	ENG	Kayden Quarcoo
60	MF	ENG	Deniro Prempeh-Murray
61	DF	ENG	Mohamed Keita
62	DF	ENG	Yusuf Mohammed
64	FW	ENG	Cameron Stones
66	MF	ENG	Connor Austin

No.	Pos.	Nation	Player
67	FW	NGR	Micah Olabiyi
68	FW	ENG	Kyle Cross
70	MF	ENG	Sandro Alexandre
71	MF		Riley Johnson
72	MF	ENG	Anthony Adu
73	MF		Leo Measoud
74	MF	ANT	Luke Harney-Rogerson
75	FW	ENG	Josh Esho
76	MF		Jamai Barnes
78	DF		Noel Opurum
79	DF		Kieran Haynes
80	DF		Noah Hawkins
—	FW		Kofi Mensah

=== Out on loan ===
Note: Flags indicate national team as defined under FIFA eligibility rules; some limited exceptions apply. Players may hold more than one non-FIFA nationality.

No.	Pos.	Nation	Player
36	FW	ENG	Jahiem Dotse (at Sholing until 4 January 2027)
37	FW	ENG	Mekhi Savage (at Hanwell Town until 30 November 2026)
40	GK	ENG	Jonny Pettitt (at Potters Bar Town until 10 December 2026)
46	DF	ENG	Josh Gidaree (at Uxbridge until January 2027)
49	FW	ENG	Koray Gurpinar (at Ascot United until 15 December 2026)

No.	Pos.	Nation	Player
55	DF	ENG	Archie Quinlan (at Aylesbury United until the end of the 2026-27 season)
58	DF	ENG	Jackson King (at Wimborne Town until 30 November 2026)
59	DF	ENG	Joseph Kandala (at Aylesbury United until December 2026)
63	MF	ENG	Ollie Webster (at Dunstable until 30 November 2026)
65	DF	ENG	Arthur Gregory (at Slough Town until the end of the 2026-27 season)

=== Wycombe Wanderers Women (part of Wycombe Wanderers Foundation) - first team squad ===
Note: Flags indicate national team as defined under FIFA eligibility rules; some limited exceptions apply. Players may hold more than one non-FIFA nationality.

No.	Pos.	Nation	Player
1	GK	ENG	Caitlin Crierie
2	MF	ENG	Laura Hennessy
3	DF	ENG	Abigail Hayes
4	DF	ENG	Emma Delves
5	DF	ENG	Catherine Beaver
6	DF	WAL	Bobby Lynch (captain)
7	FW	ENG	Jess Watkins
8	MF	ENG	Megan Arnott
9	FW	ENG	Chloe Melton
10	FW	CAN	Kayla Potter
11	FW	YEM	Eman Kassem
12	DF	IRL	Ailish Carolan
14	DF	ENG	Emma Kern
15	FW	ENG	Mimi Hodges

No.	Pos.	Nation	Player
16	MF	ENG	Jordanne Hoesli-Atkins
17	FW	ENG	Ellen Wardlaw
18	FW	ENG	Anisha Hill
19	FW	ENG	Anaisa Harney
20	FW	ENG	Natalia Makowska
21	DF	ENG	Hattie Kettle
22	MF	ENG	Amelia Mulvaney
23	MF	ENG	Abbie Carpenter
24	FW	NGR	Esther Anu
25	FW	ENG	Lois Dolder
26	GK	ENG	Axelle Courlander
27	DF	ENG	Sophie Harvey
28	FW	ENG	Molly Peters
33	MF	ENG	Mia Delaney

== Club officials ==
=== Board of directors ===
As of 7 June 2024

Position	Name
Chairman & Chief Football Officer	(England) Dan Rice
Director	(Georgia (country)) Mikheil Lomtadze
Director	(Ukraine) Eduard Vyshnyakov
Director (Trust Representative)	(England) Tony Hector
Director (Trust Representative)	(England) Trevor Stroud

=== First-team football staff ===
As of 16 October 2026

- Head Coach: Tom Hounsell
- First-Team Coach: Andrew Joslin
- Set-Piece Coach: Dave Hibbert
- Individual Player Development Lead Coach: Sam Grace
- Head of Goalkeeping: Richard Taylor
- Technical Coach and Head of Analysis: Scott Madle
- Football Insights Lead: Andreas Bancheri
- First-Team Football Analyst: Callum Brown
- First-Team Recruitment Analyst: Aidan Measures

== Managerial history ==
The club's first full-time coach, James McCormick, was appointed in 1951; the first manager (with responsibility for team selection), Brian Lee, was appointed in 1968. The appointment of Mike Dodds in 2025 as head coach was the first time that this title had been used by the club since it joined the Football League.

(England)	James McCormick	1951–1952
(England)	Sid Cann	1952–1961
(England)	Colin McDonald	1961
(England)	Graham Adams	1961–1962
(England)	Don Welsh	1962–1964
(England)	Barry Darvill	1964–1968
(England)	Brian Lee	1968–1976
(England)	Ted Powell	1976–1977
(Wales)	John Reardon	1977–1978
(England)	Andy Williams	1978–1980
(England)	Mike Keen	1980–1984
(England)	Paul Bence	1984–1986
(England)	Alan Gane	1986–1987
(England)	Peter Suddaby	1987–1988
(Scotland)	Jim Kelman	1988–1990
(Northern Ireland)	Martin O'Neill	1990–1995
(England)	Alan Smith	1995–1996
(England)	John Gregory	1996–1998
(England)	Neil Smillie	1998–1999
(Northern Ireland)	Lawrie Sanchez	1999–2003
(England)	Tony Adams	2003–2004
(Scotland)	John Gorman	2004–2006
(Scotland)	Paul Lambert	2006–2008
(England)	Peter Taylor	2008–2009
(Republic of Ireland)	Gary Waddock	2009–2012
(England)	Gareth Ainsworth	2012–2023 (player/manager 2012–2013)
(England)	Matt Bloomfield	2023–2025
(England)	Mike Dodds	2025
(Northern Ireland)	Michael Duff	2025–2026
(England)	Tom Hounsell	2026–present

== Records ==
Wycombe Wanderers' club records include the following:

- Best FA Cup performance: Semi-finals, 2000–01
- Best EFL Cup performance: Semi-finals, 2006–07
- Best EFL Trophy performance: Runners-up, 2023–24
- Best FA Amateur Cup performance: Winners, 1930–31
- Best FA Trophy performance: Winners, 1990–91, 1992–93
- Best Berks & Bucks Senior Cup performance: Winners (29), 1901–02, 1908–09, 1909–10, 1912–13, 1920–21, 1922–23, 1924–25, 1932–33, 1934–35, 1939–40, 1946–47, 1948–49, 1949–50, 1953–54, 1957–58, 1959–60, 1963–64, 1967–68, 1972–73, 1973–74, 1977–78, 1978–79, 1986–87, 1989–90, 2004–05, 2005–06, 2010–11, 2011–12, 2025–26

== Honours ==
League

- League One (level 3)
  - Play-off winners: 2020
- Third Division / League Two (level 4)
  - Third place promotion: 2008–09, 2010–11, 2017–18
  - Play-off winners: 1994
- Conference (level 5)
  - Champions: 1992–93
  - Runners-up: 1991–92
- Isthmian League
  - Champions (8): 1955–56, 1956–57, 1970–71, 1971–72, 1973–74, 1974–75, 1982–83, 1986–87
- Spartan League
  - Champions: 1919–20, 1920–21
- London Five-a-Sides
  - Winners: 1994, 1995

Cup

- EFL Trophy
  - Runners-up: 2023–24
- FA Trophy
  - Winners: 1990–91, 1992–93
- Conference League Cup
  - Winners: 1991–92
- Isthmian League Cup
  - Winners: 1984–85
- Football Conference Shield
  - Winners: 1991–92, 1992–93, 1993–94
- Football Conference Charity Shield
  - Winners: 1987–88
- FA Amateur Cup
  - Winners: 1930–31
  - Runners-up: 1956–57
- Anglo-Italian Semiprofessional Cup
  - Winners: 1975

Awards

- FA Cup Giant Killers Award: 2000–01
