= Ted Powell =

English football manager (1940–2005)

Personal information
- Date of birth: 1940
- Place of birth: Sheffield, England
- Date of death: 22 September 2005 (aged 64–65)
- Position: Wing-half

Senior career*
Years	Team	Apps	(Gls)
- Loughborough College
- Sutton United
1970–1972	Wycombe Wanderers	76	(0)

International career
- Great Britain
	England Amateurs	51	

Managerial career
- 1976–1977: Wycombe Wanderers
- 1977–1983: Malawi
- England U18
- * Club domestic league appearances and goals

Edward W. Powell (1940 – 22 September 2005) was an English amateur footballer who went on to coach the Malawi national team and the England Under-18 side which won the European Championship in 1993. Powell was a teacher at Sutton Grammar School in the late 1960s and early 1970s when he played amateur football for Sutton United.

== Early life ==
Powell was brought up in Sheffield where he attended King Edward VII School from 1952 to 1959. He played in both the football and cricket First XIs.

He spent time with Loughborough College.

== Football career ==
Powell was an amateur footballer. In the early 1960s he played for Yorkshire Amateur in the Yorkshire league. In the late 1960s and early 1970s he was a wing-half for Sutton United and Wycombe Wanderers, later managing both clubs, and represented both England Amateurs (51 caps) and the Great Britain Olympic team. In the 1968–69 season he broke his leg. He was also a member of the British national side which failed to qualify for the 1972 Summer Olympics.

He became a coach for The FA and later at Spurs at youth level. He was National Football Coach in Malawi from 1977 to 1983, during which time the team won the East and Central African challenge cup twice.

He coached the England Under-18 side to the 1993 UEFA European Under-18 Football Championship; the team included Paul Scholes, Gary Neville, Nicky Butt, Sol Campbell and Robbie Fowler.
