= Jimmy McCormick =

English footballer (1912–1968)

Personal information
- Full name: James McCormick
- Date of birth: 26 September 1912
- Place of birth: Rotherham, England
- Date of death: 4 January 1968 (aged 55)
- Place of death: Marbella, Spain
- Height: 5 ft 7 in (1.70 m)
- Position: Winger

Senior career*
Years	Team	Apps	(Gls)
- Rotherham YMCA
	Rotherham United	19	(2)
- Scarborough
1932–1933	Chesterfield	15	(2)
1933–1946	Tottenham Hotspur	137	(26)
1946–1947	Fulham	9	(2)
1947–1949	Lincoln City	64	(4)
1949	Crystal Palace	13	(2)
1949-1950	Sliema Wanderers	14	(5)

Managerial career
- 1949–1950: Sliema Wanderers (player-coach)
- 1950–1951: Turkey
- 1951–1952: Wycombe Wanderers
- 1953–1954: York City
- * Club domestic league appearances and goals

James McCormick (26 September 1912 – 4 January 1968) was an English professional football player and manager.

McCormick began his career with Rotherham United having been spotted playing for the local YMCA. Despite interest from other clubs, he moved to Chesterfield in 1932 and just eight months later he signed for Tottenham Hotspur.

After revitalising the side's 1933/34 promotion push, McCormick became a mainstay of the side that finish 3rd in the 1933/34 First Division and remained a constant figure until a serious injury suffered at the start of the 1937/38 season virtually finished his career.

After guesting for more than a dozen clubs during the Second World War, McCormick joined Fulham in 1946 but injuries restricted him to just nine appearances in two years and he moved to Lincoln City in 1947. He spent just three months with Crystal Palace in 1949.

== Managerial statistics ==
Team	Nat	From	To	Record				
Team	Nat	From	To	G	W	L	D	Win %
York City	(England)	1 June 1953	1 September 1954	51	14	24	13	27.45
