= Mike Dodds =

English football coach

Personal information
- Full name: Mike Dodds
- Date of birth: 3 June 1986 (age 40)
- Place of birth: England

Team information
- Current team: Blackburn Rovers (Assistant Head Coach)

Managerial career
- Years: Team
- 2022: Sunderland (caretaker)
- 2023: Sunderland (caretaker)
- 2024: Sunderland (caretaker)
- 2025: Wycombe Wanderers
- 2026–: Blackburn Rovers (caretaker)

Mike Dodds (born 3 June 1986) is an English football coach, currently serving as assistant head coach at EFL Championship club Blackburn Rovers.

== Career ==
At the age of 18, Dodds joined Coventry City as a youth coach, after acquiring his UEFA B License whilst still at college. He joined Birmingham City's academy in a coaching capacity in 2009, and 11 years later he became their academy manager. During his time at Birmingham, he was credited with having a positive impact on the development of academy graduates Nathan Redmond, Demarai Gray and Jude Bellingham.

In August 2021, Dodds left Birmingham to join Sunderland as head of individual player development. On 2 February 2022, he was appointed interim manager of Sunderland, following the dismissal of Lee Johnson and again following the dismissal of Tony Mowbray. On 19 February 2024, Dodds was again appointed interim manager of the club until the end of the season following the dismissal of Michael Beale.

On 2 February 2025, Dodds was appointed head coach of League One second-placed side Wycombe Wanderers on a three-and-a-half year deal. His first game was the FA Cup 4th Round away to Preston North End in which Wycombe lost on penalties. He secured his first win as head coach in a 2–0 victory against Bristol Rovers. Wycombe Wanderers and Dodds parted ways on 18 September 2025.

In January 2026, Dodds was appointed assistant head coach of Championship club Oxford United, working under Matt Bloomfield.

In June 2026, he joined Blackburn Rovers as assistant head coach to Mowbray. On 17 November, Mowbray stepped back due to health issues, and Damien Johnson and Dodds were put in charge of the first team.

== Managerial statistics ==
As of match played 13 September 2025

Managerial record by team and tenure
Team	From	To	Record					
Team	From	To	P	W	D	L	Win %	Ref
Sunderland (interim)	2 February 2022	11 February 2022	2	0	0	2	0.00	
Sunderland (interim)	4 December 2023	18 December 2023	3	2	0	1	66.67	
Sunderland (interim)	19 February 2024	4 May 2024	13	2	3	8	15.38	
Wycombe Wanderers	2 February 2025	18 September 2025	31	9	9	13	29.03	
Total			49	13	12	24	26.53	—
