= 1990–91 FA Trophy =

1990-91 FA Trophy
FA Challenge Trophy

Tournament details
- Country: England; Wales
- Teams: 183

Final positions
- Champions: Wycombe Wanderers
- Runners-up: Kidderminster Harriers

The 1990–91 FA Trophy was the twenty-second season of the FA Trophy.

== First qualifying round ==
=== Ties ===
Tie	Home team	Score	Away team
1	Accrington Stanley	3–2	Whitley Bay
2	Alvechurch	0–1	Mossley
3	Andover	1-1	Cambridge City
4	Ashford Town (Kent)	1-1	Southwick
5	Banbury United	1–5	V S Rugby
6	Barking	4–1	Witney Town
7	Barry Town	5–0	Saltash United
8	Basingstoke Town	1-1	Mossley
9	Bedworth United	4–0	Willenhall Town
10	Bishop's Stortford	2–1	Rushden Town
11	Bognor Regis Town	5–2	Erith & Belvedere
12	Bridgend Town	2-2	Bideford
13	Burnham	2-2	Wembley
14	Caernarfon Town	0–1	Leicester United
15	Cambridge City	3–0	Chalfont St Peter
16	Chelmsford City	0–1	Tamworth
17	Congleton Town	3–1	Newtown
18	Consett	2–1	Whitby Town
19	Corby Town	0–1	Hayes
20	Crawley Town	0-0	Hampton
21	Croydon	5–3	Folkestone
22	Cwmbran Town	1–0	Maesteg Park
23	Dorchester Town	3–0	Taunton Town
24	Dorking	2–1	Waterlooville
25	Dulwich Hamlet	0-0	Bromley
26	Easington Colliery	4–1	Durham City
27	Emley	2–1	Southport
28	Fareham Town	3–0	Worthing
29	Ferryhill Athletic	0-0	North Shields
30	Gainsborough Trinity	2–0	Worksop Town
31	Gloucester City	2-2	Ton Pentre
32	Gosport Borough	2–1	Bashley
33	Grantham Town	0–1	Atherstone United
34	Grays Athletic	1–0	Heybridge Swifts
35	Halesowen Town	1–3	Colwyn Bay
36	Horwich R M I	1–0	Alfreton Town
37	Marlow	2–1	Aveley
38	Matlock Town	3–2	Buxton
39	Moor Green	1–0	Hednesford Town
40	Morecambe	3–0	Workington
41	Redditch United	1–0	Eastwood Town
42	Rhyl	1–0	Goole Town
43	South Liverpool	3–1	Brandon United
44	St Albans City	0–4	Chesham United
45	Staines Town	0–3	Harlow Town
46	Stalybridge Celtic	1–0	Shepshed Charterhouse
47	Stockton	1–4	Fleetwood Town
48	Stroud	3–0	Poole Town
49	Sutton Coldfield Town	2-2	Boreham Wood
50	Uxbridge	1-1	Stourbridge
51	Walton & Hersham	2–0	Lewes
52	Weston Super Mare	0-0	Newport A.F.C
53	Whickham	0–1	Alnwick Town
54	Whyteleafe	0–1	Tooting & Mitcham United
55	Winsford United	1–4	Droylsden
56	Yeading	3–1	Bury Town

=== Replays ===
Tie	Home team	Score	Away team
3	Canterbury City	2–3	Andover
4	Southwick	1–0	Ashford Town (Kent)
8	Molesey	1–0	Basingstoke Town
12	Bideford	0–2	Bridgend Town
13	Wembley	3–1	Burnham
20	Hampton	2-2	Crawley Town
25	Bromley	4–1	Dulwich Hamlet
29	North Shields	0–2	Ferryhill Athletic
31	Ton Pentre	0–2	Gloucester City
49	Boreham Wood	1-1	Sutton Coldfield Town
50	Stourbridge	0–2	Uxbridge
52	Newport A.F.C	3–1	Weston Super Mare

=== 2nd replay ===
Tie	Home team	Score	Away team
20	Crawley Town	4–2	Hampton
49	Sutton Coldfield Town	1-1	Boreham Wood

=== 3rd replay ===
Tie	Home team	Score	Away team
49	Boreham Wood	0–1	Sutton Coldfield Town

== Second qualifying round ==
=== Ties ===
Tie	Home team	Score	Away team
1	Accrington Stanley	2–1	Easington Colliery
2	Andover	1–2	Salisbury
3	Barking	1–2	Uxbridge
4	Barry Town	4–0	Bridgend Town
5	Bishop's Stortford	2–3	Harlow Town
6	Cambridge City	1-1	Yeading
7	Congleton Town	1–0	Radcliffe Borough
8	Consett	1-1	Alnwick Town
9	Cwmbran Town	1-1	Dorchester Town
10	Dorking	2-2	Tooting & Mitcham United
11	Droylsden	3-3	Matlock Town
12	Fareham Town	0–2	Bognor Regis Town
13	Ferryhill Athletic	0-0	Emley
14	Gainsborough Trinity	1–3	Moor Green
15	Gloucester City	3–0	Llanelli
16	Gosport Borough	1-1	Crawley Town
17	Hayes	1-1	Hitchin Town
18	Horwich R M I	3–2	Rhyl
19	Leicester United	5–2	Dudley Town
20	Margate	2–1	Bromley
21	Marlow	5–0	Wembley
22	Mossley	1–3	Atherstone United
23	Newport A.F.C	0–3	Stroud
24	Redditch United	1–2	Bedworth United
25	Shildon	0–3	Morecambe
26	South Liverpool	0–1	Fleetwood Town
27	Southwick	0–3	Molesey
28	Stalybridge Celtic	0–1	Colwyn Bay
29	Sutton Coldfield Town	2–1	Baldock Town
30	Tamworth	1–2	Chesham United
31	V S Rugby	1-1	Grays Athletic
32	Walton & Hersham	6–0	Croydon

=== Replays ===
Tie	Home team	Score	Away team
6	Yeading	2–1	Cambridge City
8	Alnwick Town	1–0	Consett
9	Dorchester Town	4–1	Cwmbran Town
10	Tooting & Mitcham United	0–1	Dorking
11	Matlock Town	0–2	Droylsden
13	Emley	4–1	Ferryhill Athletic
16	Crawley Town	0–1	Gosport Borough
17	Hitchin Town	1–2	Hayes
31	Grays Athletic	0–2	V S Rugby

== Third qualifying round ==
=== Ties ===
Tie	Home team	Score	Away team
1	Atherstone United	0–2	Wivenhoe Town
2	Barry Town	0-0	Salisbury
3	Bedworth United	1-1	Bangor City
4	Bishop Auckland	3–1	Newcastle Blue Star
5	Bognor Regis Town	3–0	Worcester City
6	Boston United	3–2	Leicester United
7	Carshalton Athletic	5–0	Dorchester Town
8	Colwyn Bay	1–3	Witton Albion
9	Congleton Town	0–3	Moor Green
10	Dagenham	0–1	Enfield
11	Dorking	2–1	Gosport Borough
12	Droylsden	3-3	Bromsgrove Rovers
13	Emley	2–1	Morecambe
14	Fleetwood Town	2–0	Marine
15	Frickley Athletic	2–0	Seaham Red Star
16	Gravesend & Northfleet	3–0	Hendon
17	Guisborough Town	4–1	Accrington Stanley
18	Harrow Borough	0–2	Fisher Athletic
19	Hayes	3–2	Kingstonian
20	Leyton Wingate	0–1	Wealdstone
21	Margate	1-1	V S Rugby
22	Marlow	1–2	Chesham United
23	Metropolitan Police	3–2	Harlow Town
24	Nuneaton Borough	1–2	Burton Albion
25	South Bank	2-2	Blyth Spartans
26	Spennymoor United	0-0	Chorley
27	Stroud	3–1	Uxbridge
28	Sutton Coldfield Town	1–3	Horwich R M I
29	Tow Law Town	2–1	Alnwick Town
30	Walton & Hersham	0–1	Windsor & Eton
31	Weymouth	1-1	Gloucester City
32	Yeading	0–1	Molesey

=== Replays ===
Tie	Home team	Score	Away team
2	Salisbury	1–0	Barry Town
3	Bangor City	1–2	Bedworth United
12	Bromsgrove Rovers	1–3	Droylsden
21	V S Rugby	5–0	Margate
25	Blyth Spartans	1-1	South Bank
26	Chorley	1–0	Spennymoor United
31	Gloucester City	3–0	Weymouth

=== 2nd replay ===
Tie	Home team	Score	Away team
25	South Bank	2–0	Blyth Spartans

== 1st round ==
The teams that given byes to this round are Barrow, Colchester United, Barnet, Runcorn, Macclesfield Town, Kettering Town, Welling United, Yeovil Town, Sutton United, Merthyr Tydfil, Wycombe Wanderers, Cheltenham Town, Telford United, Kidderminster Harriers, Northwich Victoria, Altrincham, Stafford Rangers, Slough Town, Bath City, Gateshead, Farnborough Town, Aylesbury United, Dartford, Wokingham Town, Redbridge Forest, Billingham Synthonia, Woking, Dover Athletic, Hyde United, Leek Town and Gretna.

=== Ties ===
Tie	Home team	Score	Away team
1	Barnet	2–3	Farnborough Town
2	Barrow	2–0	Chorley
3	Bognor Regis Town	2–4	Aylesbury United
4	Burton Albion	3–0	Moor Green
5	Carshalton Athletic	0-0	Dartford
6	Dover Athletic	1–0	Dorking
7	Droylsden	2–1	Fleetwood Town
8	Enfield	1–0	Chesham United
9	Fisher Athletic	1–2	Redbridge Forest
10	Frickley Athletic – Bye		
11	Gateshead	2-2	Billingham Synthonia
12	Gloucester City	1–0	Yeovil Town
13	Gravesend & Northfleet	2-2	Cheltenham Town
14	Guisborough Town	2-2	Witton Albion
15	Horwich R M I	2–0	Bedworth United
16	Hyde United	1–2	Stafford Rangers (tie awarded to Hyde United)
17	Kettering Town	4–2	Woking
18	Kidderminster Harriers	4–2	Sutton United
19	Leek Town	0–4	Altrincham
20	Macclesfield Town	0–2	Gretna
21	Molesey	1-1	Merthyr Tydfil
22	Northwich Victoria	2–1	Tow Law Town
23	Runcorn	2–0	Boston United
24	Salisbury	1–4	V S Rugby
25	Slough Town	2–4	Bath City
26	South Bank	1–0	Bishop Auckland
27	Stroud	2-2	Metropolitan Police
28	Telford United	0-0	Emley
29	Welling United	3–1	Hayes
30	Windsor & Eton	0–1	Colchester United
31	Wokingham Town	1–2	Wivenhoe Town
32	Wycombe Wanderers	1–0	Wealdstone

=== Replays ===
Tie	Home team	Score	Away team
5	Dartford	1-1	Carshalton Athletic
11	Billingham Synthonia	0–3	Gateshead
13	Cheltenham Town	5–1	Gravesend & Northfleet
14	Witton Albion	2–1	Guisborough Town
21	Merthyr Tydfil	1–0	Molesey
27	Metropolitan Police	0–2	Stroud
28	Emley	1–0	Telford United

=== 2nd replay ===
Tie	Home team	Score	Away team
5	Carshalton Athletic	2–3	Dartford

== 2nd round ==
=== Ties ===
Tie	Home team	Score	Away team
1	Altrincham	3–1	Gateshead
2	Barrow	0-0	Kettering Town
3	Colchester United	2–0	Runcorn
4	Dartford	0–2	Cheltenham Town
5	Enfield	0–2	Wivenhoe Town
6	Farnborough Town	1–3	Bath City
7	Horwich R M I	2–1	Gretna
8	Hyde United	0-0	Emley
9	Kidderminster Harriers	1–0	Dover Athletic
10	Merthyr Tydfil	1–3	Gloucester City
11	Northwich Victoria	4–1	Droylsden
12	Redbridge Forest	2–1	Frickley Athletic
13	Stroud	3–2	Burton Albion
14	V S Rugby	0–1	Wycombe Wanderers
15	Welling United	2–1	Aylesbury United
16	Witton Albion	3–2	South Bank

=== Replays ===
Tie	Home team	Score	Away team
2	Kettering Town	2–1	Barrow
8	Emley	3–2	Hyde United

== 3rd round ==
=== Ties ===
Tie	Home team	Score	Away team
1	Colchester United	3–0	Wivenhoe Town
2	Emley	3–2	Kettering Town
3	Horwich R M I	2–1	Redbridge Forest
4	Kidderminster Harriers	3–1	Bath City
5	Northwich Victoria	2–0	Stroud
6	Welling United	1–2	Altrincham
7	Witton Albion	3–0	Gloucester City
8	Wycombe Wanderers	2–1	Cheltenham Town

== 4th round ==
=== Ties ===
Tie	Home team	Score	Away team
1	Altrincham	5–0	Horwich R M I
2	Colchester United	0–2	Witton Albion
3	Kidderminster Harriers	3–0	Emley
4	Northwich Victoria	2–3	Wycombe Wanderers

== Semi finals ==
=== First leg ===
Tie	Home team	Score	Away team
1	Kidderminster Harriers	1–0	Witton Albion
2	Wycombe Wanderers	2–1	Altrincham

=== Second leg ===
Tie	Home team	Score	Away team	Aggregate
1	Witton Albion	4–3	Kidderminster Harriers	4-4
2	Altrincham	0–2	Wycombe Wanderers	1–4

=== Replay ===
Tie	Home team	Score	Away team
1	Kidderminster Harriers	2–1	Witton Albion

== Final ==
=== Tie ===
Home team	Score	Away team
Wycombe Wanderers	2–1	Kidderminster Harriers
