= 1992–93 FA Trophy =

1992-93 FA Trophy
FA Challenge Trophy

Tournament details
- Country: England; Wales
- Teams: 165

Final positions
- Champions: Wycombe Wanderers
- Runners-up: Runcorn

The 1992–93 FA Trophy was the twenty-fourth season of the FA Trophy.

== First qualifying round ==
=== Ties ===
Tie	Home team	Score	Away team
1	Accrington Stanley	3-1	Whitley Bay
2	Alfreton Town	2-4	Eastwood Town
3	Andover	0-3	Abingdon Town
4	Ashford Town (Kent)	0-0	Yeading
5	Baldock Town	4-3	Barking
6	Barri	2-1	Bideford
7	Boreham Wood	3-1	Aveley
8	Carshalton Athletic	1-2	Crawley Town
9	Chelmsford City	1-3	Hendon
10	Chorley	2-2	Newcastle Blue Star
11	Congleton Town	4-2	Grantham Town
12	Corby Town	1-4	Billericay Town
13	Croydon	0-1	Dulwich Hamlet
14	Dorchester Town	3-1	Waterlooville
15	Droylsden	0-2	Winsford United
16	Easington Colliery w/o-scr North Shields		
17	Fareham Town	2-2	Margate
18	Gainsborough Trinity	1-1	Solihull Borough
19	Halesowen Town w/o-scr Alvechurch		
20	Hayes	6-1	Tamworth
21	Heybridge Swifts	2-1	Cambridge City
22	Hitchin Town	3-1	Bishop's Stortford
23	Leicester United	1-1	Worksop Town
24	Marlow	3-2	Lewes
25	Molesey	1-3	Basingstoke Town
26	Moor Green	1-1	Colwyn Bay
27	Mossley	6-2	Dudley Town
28	Peterlee Newtown	2-1	Guiseley
29	Redditch United	0-3	Caernarfon Town
30	Saltash United	2-5	Trowbridge Town
31	Shepshed Albion	1-0	Bedworth United
32	Spennymoor United	4-3	Brandon United
33	Staines Town	1-2	Leyton
34	Stevenage Borough w/o-scr Harlow Town		
35	Tooting & Mitcham United	0-1	Walton & Hersham
36	Uxbridge	3-2	Bognor Regis Town
37	Weymouth	2-2	Newport A F C
38	Whyteleafe	2-2	Hastings Town

=== Replays ===
Tie	Home team	Score	Away team
4	Yeading	5-2	Ashford Town (Kent)
10	Newcastle Blue Star	3-1	Chorley
17	Margate	1-0	Fareham Town
18	Solihull Borough	4-4	Gainsborough Trinity
23	Worksop Town	1-5	Leicester United
26	Colwyn Bay	4-2	Moor Green
37	Newport A F C	2-1	Weymouth
38	Hastings Town	1-1	Whyteleafe

=== 2nd replays ===
Tie	Home team	Score	Away team
18	Gainsborough Trinity	0-4	Solihull Borough
38	Whyteleafe	0-3	Hastings Town

== Second qualifying round ==
=== Ties ===
Tie	Home team	Score	Away team
1	Abingdon Town	2-1	Marlow
2	Accrington Stanley	5-0	Easington Colliery
3	Baldock Town	0-1	Heybridge Swifts
4	Barri	0-2	Weston Super Mare
5	Basingstoke Town	2-0	Crawley Town
6	Billericay Town	3-4	Stourbridge
7	Caernarfon Town	1-4	Goole Town
8	Colwyn Bay	0-1	Solihull Borough
9	Dorchester Town	1-2	Poole Town
10	Fisher Athletic	2-2	Canterbury City
11	Hednesford Town	1-2	Halesowen Town
12	Hendon	0-0	Grays Athletic
13	Leicester United	3-1	Matlock Town
14	Margate	1-3	Hastings Town
15	Mossley	3-1	Eastwood Town
16	Nuneaton Borough	3-1	Congleton Town
17	Peterlee Newtown	1-1	Shildon
18	Purfleet	3-2	Boreham Wood
19	Seaham Red Star	2-4	Spennymoor United
20	St Albans City	3-2	Hayes
21	Stevenage Borough	2-1	Chalfont St Peter
22	Stockton	10-2	Ferryhill Athletic
23	Sutton Coldfield Town	2-1	Leyton
24	Trowbridge Town	0-1	Newport A F C
25	Uxbridge	0-2	Dulwich Hamlet
26	Walton & Hersham	2-0	Gravesend & Northfleet
27	Warrington Town	3-0	Shepshed Albion
28	Wembley	3-1	Hitchin Town
29	West Auckland Town	1-1	Consett
30	Winsford United	0-0	Buxton
31	Workington	0-2	Newcastle Blue Star
32	Yeading	2-2	Maidenhead United

=== Replays ===
Tie	Home team	Score	Away team
10	Canterbury City	3-1	Fisher Athletic
12	Grays Athletic	2-1	Hendon
17	Shildon	2-0	Peterlee Newtown
29	Consett	2-2	West Auckland Town
30	Buxton	0-3	Winsford United
32	Maidenhead United	0-3	Yeading

=== 2nd replay ===
Tie	Home team	Score	Away team
29	West Auckland Town	1-1	Consett

=== 3rd replay ===
Tie	Home team	Score	Away team
29	West Auckland Town	0-3	Consett

== Third qualifying round ==
=== Ties ===
Tie	Home team	Score	Away team
1	Abingdon Town	2-1	Dorking
2	Accrington Stanley	6-0	Tow Law Town
3	Basingstoke Town	3-0	Dulwich Hamlet
4	Billingham Synthonia	1-1	Consett
5	Chesham United	7-3	Leicester United
6	Emley	2-6	Spennymoor United
7	Fleetwood Town	1-3	Blyth Spartans
8	Goole Town	0-1	Bishop Auckland
9	Grays Athletic	2-1	Atherstone United
10	Guisborough Town	2-0	Shildon
11	Harrow Borough	2-2	Stevenage Borough
12	Hastings Town	2-1	Wokingham Town
13	Heybridge Swifts	1-0	Halesowen Town
14	Horwich R M I	1-2	Winsford United
15	Kingstonian	5-0	Canterbury City
16	Morecambe	2-2	Southport
17	Mossley	2-4	Frickley Athletic
18	Newport A F C	1-2	Sutton United
19	Northallerton Town	2-1	Newcastle Blue Star
20	Nuneaton Borough	0-0	Burton Albion
21	Poole Town	1-1	Bashley
22	Slough Town	3-1	Bromley
23	St Albans City	2-0	Purfleet
24	Stafford Rangers	1-1	Wembley
25	Stourbridge	1-4	Leek Town
26	Sutton Coldfield Town	1-1	V S Rugby
27	Warrington Town	5-2	Stockton
28	Wealdstone	5-2	Solihull Borough
29	Weston Super Mare	1-0	Windsor & Eton
30	Whitby Town	2-1	South Bank
31	Worcester City	2-1	Salisbury
32	Yeading	3-1	Walton & Hersham

=== Replays ===
Tie	Home team	Score	Away team
4	Consett	2-6	Billingham Synthonia
11	Stevenage Borough	4-0	Harrow Borough
16	Southport	1-3	Morecambe
20	Burton Albion	0-3	Nuneaton Borough
21	Bashley	2-2	Poole Town
24	Wembley	0-1	Stafford Rangers
26	V S Rugby	5-4	Sutton Coldfield Town

=== 2nd replay ===
Tie	Home team	Score	Away team
21	Poole Town	2-4	Bashley

== 1st round ==
The teams that given byes to this round are Wycombe Wanderers, Kettering Town, Merthyr Tydfil, Farnborough Town, Telford United, Dagenham & Redbridge, Boston United, Bath City, Witton Albion, Northwich Victoria, Welling United, Macclesfield Town, Gateshead, Yeovil Town, Runcorn, Altrincham, Kidderminster Harriers, Bromsgrove Rovers, Stalybridge Celtic, Woking, Cheltenham Town, Barrow, Aylesbury United, Dover Athletic, Hyde United, Gretna, Gloucester City, Enfield, Wivenhoe Town, Marine and Murton.

=== Ties ===
Tie	Home team	Score	Away team
1	Barrow	0-1	Billingham Synthonia
2	Basingstoke Town	1-4	Kingstonian
3	Bishop Auckland	1-0	Leek Town
4	Dover Athletic	1-1	Hastings Town
5	Farnborough Town	4-0	Abingdon Town
6	Gateshead	3-0	Gretna
7	Gloucester City – Bye		
8	Grays Athletic	1-0	Stafford Rangers
9	Heybridge Swifts	1-0	Worcester City
10	Hyde United	1-2	Runcorn
11	Kettering Town	0-0	Bromsgrove Rovers
12	Kidderminster Harriers	1-3	Enfield
13	Macclesfield Town	0-0	Witton Albion
14	Marine	2-0	Blyth Spartans
15	Merthyr Tydfil	3-0	Wivenhoe Town
16	Morecambe	5-1	Frickley Athletic
17	Murton	1-2	Nuneaton Borough
18	Northallerton Town	3-0	Whitby Town
19	Spennymoor United	1-2	Boston United
20	St Albans City	1-0	Weston Super Mare
21	Stalybridge Celtic	2-0	Accrington Stanley
22	Stevenage Borough	2-0	Bath City
23	Sutton United	3-0	Woking
24	Telford United	2-1	Northwich Victoria
25	V S Rugby	1-6	Chesham United
26	Warrington Town	2-1	Guisborough Town
27	Wealdstone	1-2	Bashley
28	Welling United	2-0	Aylesbury United
29	Winsford United	2-0	Altrincham
30	Wycombe Wanderers	3-1	Cheltenham Town
31	Yeading	1-1	Slough Town
32	Yeovil Town	0-0	Dagenham & Redbridge

=== Replays ===
Tie	Home team	Score	Away team
4	Hastings Town	0-2	Dover Athletic
11	Bromsgrove Rovers	4-1	Kettering Town
13	Witton Albion	2-1	Macclesfield Town
31	Slough Town	2-1	Yeading
32	Dagenham & Redbridge	2-1	Yeovil Town

== 2nd round ==
=== Ties ===
Tie	Home team	Score	Away team
1	Billingham Synthonia	1-2	Winsford United
2	Bishop Auckland	0-1	Warrington Town
3	Bromsgrove Rovers	3-1	Dagenham & Redbridge
4	Chesham United	1-0	Dover Athletic
5	Farnborough Town	4-0	Enfield
6	Gateshead	3-1	Heybridge Swifts
7	Gloucester City	3-3	Runcorn
8	Kingstonian	1-2	Telford United
9	Morecambe	1-1	Wycombe Wanderers
10	Northallerton Town	1-0	Bashley
11	Nuneaton Borough	0-1	Marine
12	St Albans City	0-2	Witton Albion
13	Stalybridge Celtic	1-1	Merthyr Tydfil
14	Stevenage Borough	0-1	Grays Athletic
15	Sutton United	3-1	Slough Town
16	Welling United	1-2	Boston United

=== Replays ===
Tie	Home team	Score	Away team
7	Runcorn	2-2	Gloucester City
9	Wycombe Wanderers	2-0	Morecambe
13	Merthyr Tydfil	1-0	Stalybridge Celtic

=== 2nd replay ===
Tie	Home team	Score	Away team
7	Gloucester City	0-0	Runcorn

=== 3rd replay ===
Tie	Home team	Score	Away team
7	Runcorn	4-1	Gloucester City

== 3rd round ==
=== Ties ===
Tie	Home team	Score	Away team
1	Chesham United	1-3	Sutton United
2	Grays Athletic	1-1	Gateshead
3	Merthyr Tydfil	1-1	Warrington Town
4	Northallerton Town	1-3	Farnborough Town
5	Runcorn	1-0	Winsford United
6	Telford United	1-1	Boston United
7	Witton Albion	1-0	Marine
8	Wycombe Wanderers	2-0	Bromsgrove Rovers

=== Replays ===
Tie	Home team	Score	Away team
2	Gateshead	3-0	Grays Athletic
3	Warrington Town	3-2	Merthyr Tydfil
6	Boston United	4-0	Telford United

== 4th round ==
=== Ties ===
Tie	Home team	Score	Away team
1	Boston United	0-2	Runcorn
2	Sutton United	2-1	Warrington Town
3	Witton Albion	3-2	Farnborough Town
4	Wycombe Wanderers	1-0	Gateshead

== Semi finals ==
=== First leg ===
Tie	Home team	Score	Away team
1	Runcorn	2-0	Witton Albion
2	Wycombe Wanderers	2-3	Sutton United

=== Second leg ===
Tie	Home team	Score	Away team	Aggregate
1	Witton Albion	1-0	Runcorn	1-2
2	Sutton United	0-4	Wycombe Wanderers	3-6

== Final ==
=== Tie ===
Home team	Score	Away team
Wycombe Wanderers	4-1	Runcorn
