= Loakes Park =

Former stadium of Wycombe Wanderers Football Club

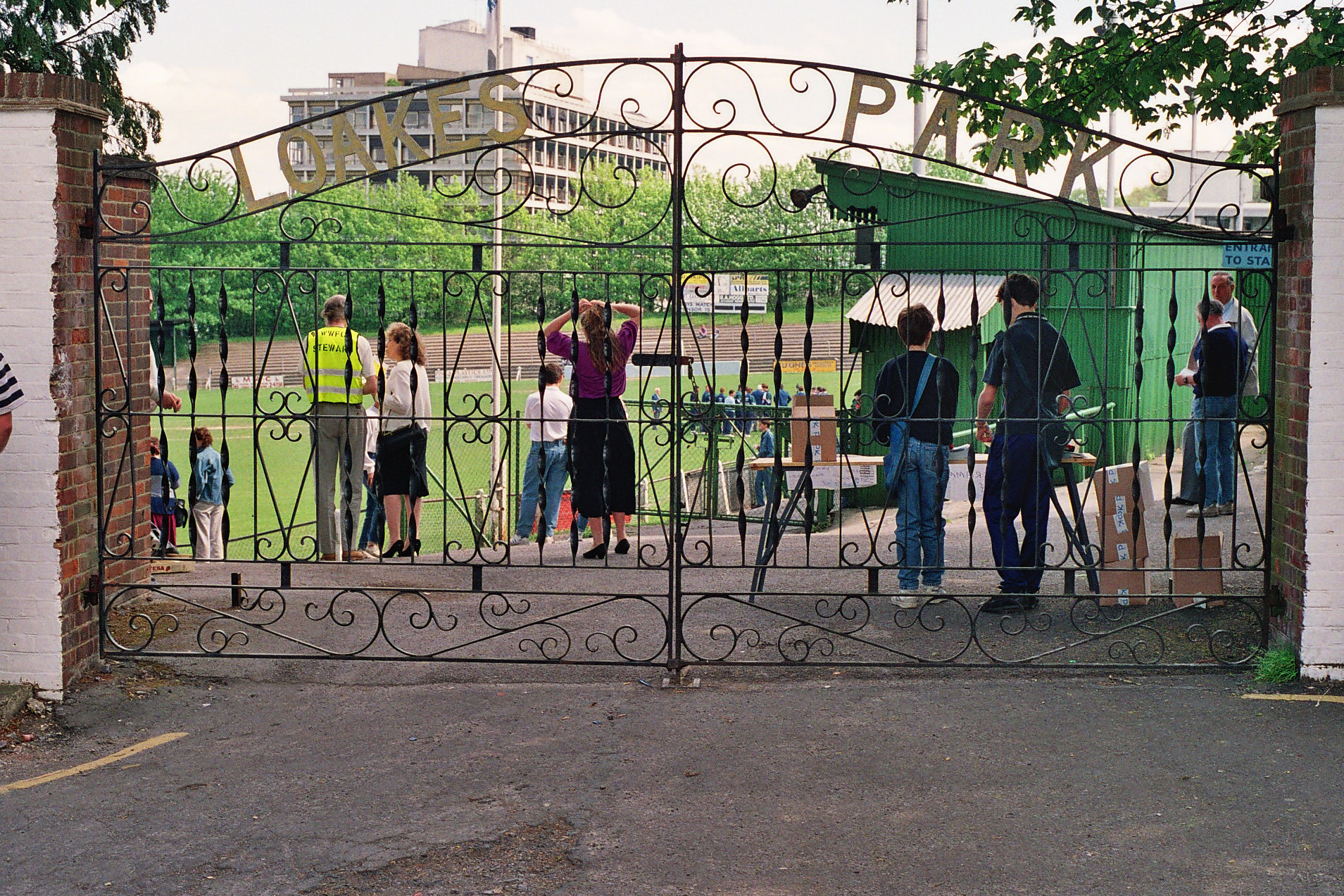
- Interactive map of Loakes Park
- Location: Queen Alexandra Road, High Wycombe, Buckinghamshire, England
- Coordinates: 51°37′35.77″N 0°45′17.24″W
- Owner: Wycombe Wanderers F.C.
- Capacity: 19,000 (1950–1973); 15,000 (1973–1974); 12,000 (1974–1988); 6,000 (1988–1990)
- Surface: Grass
- Record attendance: 15,850 (Wycombe Wanderers v St Albans City, FA Amateur Cup, 25 February 1950)

Construction
- Opened: 1895
- Expanded: 1904, 1923, 1932
- Closed: 1990
- Demolished: 1990/91

Tenant
- Wycombe Wanderers F.C. (1895–1990)

Loakes Park was a football ground in High Wycombe, Buckinghamshire, and served as the home of Wycombe Wanderers F.C. from 1895 until 1990. Located beside Wycombe General Hospital, the ground was donated to the club by former player Frank Adams, who purchased the freehold from Lord Carrington in 1945. Wycombe Wanderers moved to Adams Park for the 1990–91 season, with the new stadium named in Adams’ honour.

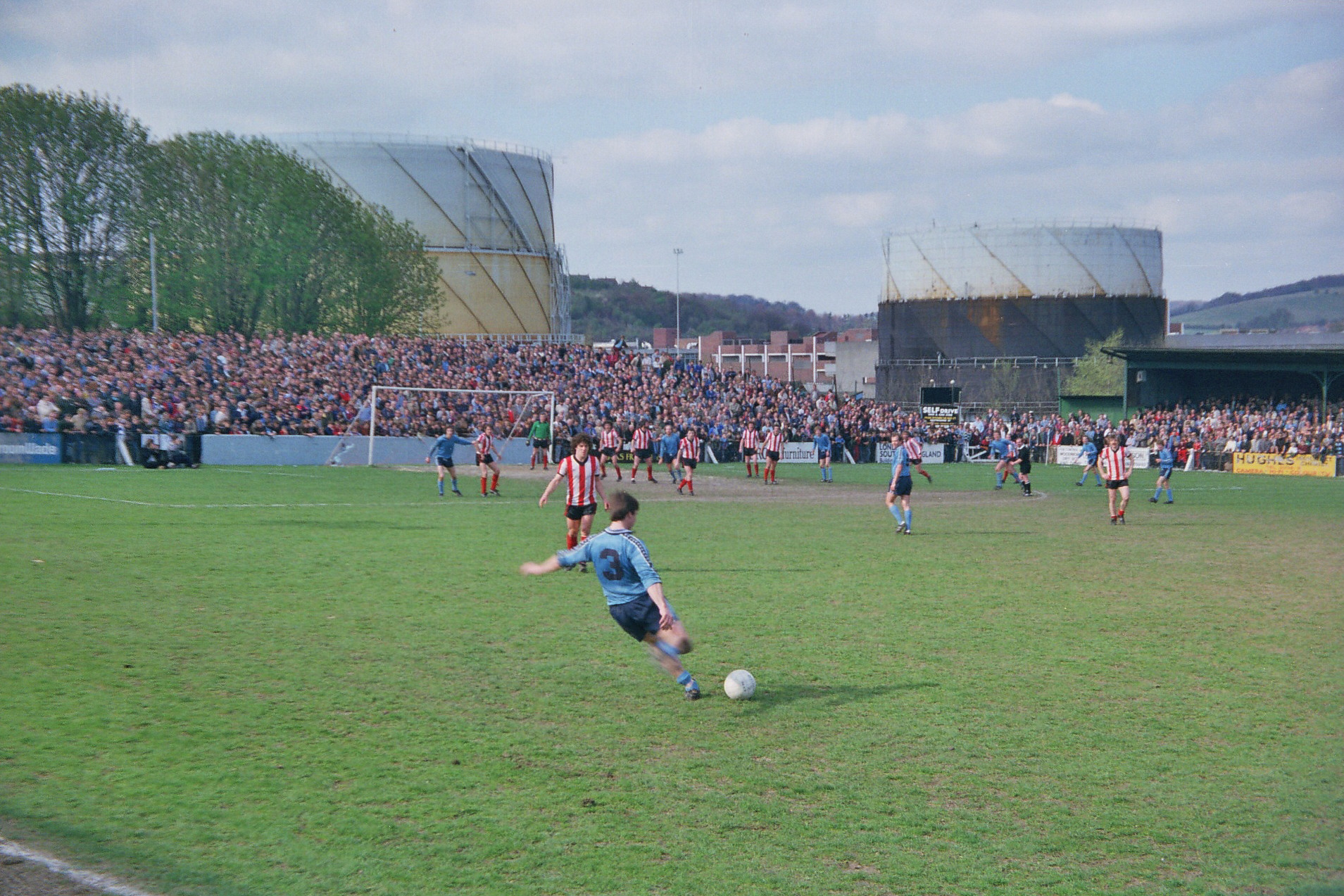
FA Trophy semi-final second leg v Altrincham at Loakes Park (17 April 1982)

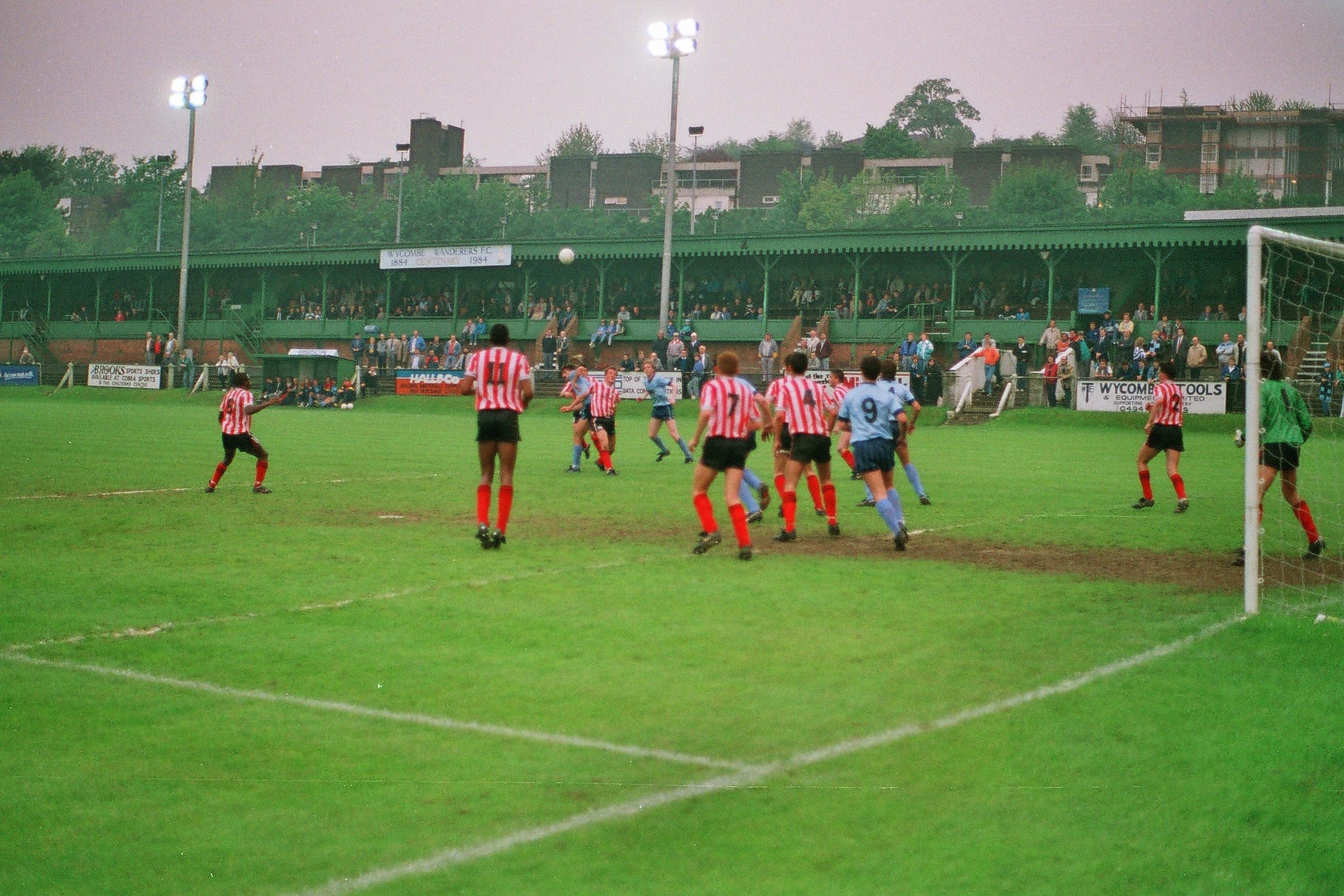
President's Cup final v Brentford at Loakes Park (12 May 1988)

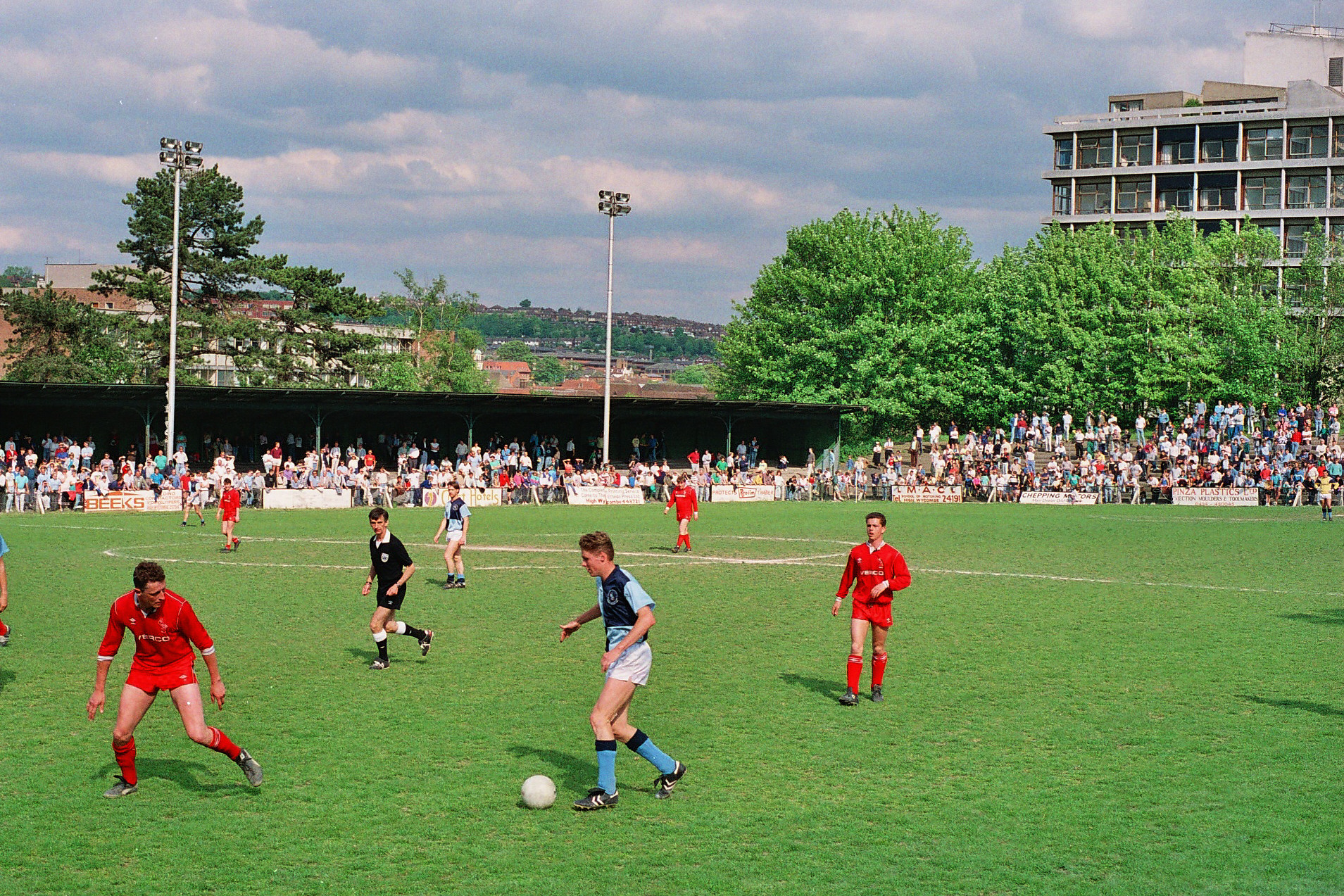
Final match at Loakes Park – Wycombe Wanderers v Martin O'Neill's International XI (7 May 1990)

== History ==
Wycombe Wanderers moved to Loakes Park in 1895 after their previous ground, Spring Meadow, became unavailable for football. The first match at the new ground was played on 7 September 1895 against Park Grove.

The ground was developed in stages during the early 20th century, with major improvements in 1904, 1923 and 1932. One of its most distinctive features was the pronounced slope across the pitch, falling approximately 11 feet (3.4 m) from one side to the other.

In the early 1970s, Wycombe General Hospital announced plans to expand onto land occupied by the ground. A compulsory purchase order was later issued, requiring the club to seek a new site. Several proposed locations within High Wycombe were rejected before approval was granted for a site at Hillbottom Road in the Sands area. Construction of the new stadium began in 1989, and Wycombe Wanderers moved to Adams Park the following year.

== Facilities ==
Loakes Park featured a wooden main stand on the south side of the ground, seating around 1,000 spectators. Opposite stood a covered terrace known informally as the “Cowshed”, while both ends of the ground consisted of open terracing with crowd barriers. The sloping pitch was the ground’s most recognisable characteristic.

== Notable matches ==
The record attendance at Loakes Park was 15,850, set on 25 February 1950 during an FA Amateur Cup Fourth Round tie in which Wycombe Wanderers defeated St Albans City 4–1.

A notable FA Cup match took place on 4 January 1975, when non‑league Wycombe Wanderers held First Division Middlesbrough to a 0–0 draw in the Third Round.

== Closure and redevelopment ==
Loakes Park closed in 1990 and was demolished the following year. The site was later redeveloped to provide additional parking for Wycombe General Hospital and new residential housing. The original entrance gates were transferred to Adams Park.
