= Adams Park =

Football stadium in High Wycombe, England

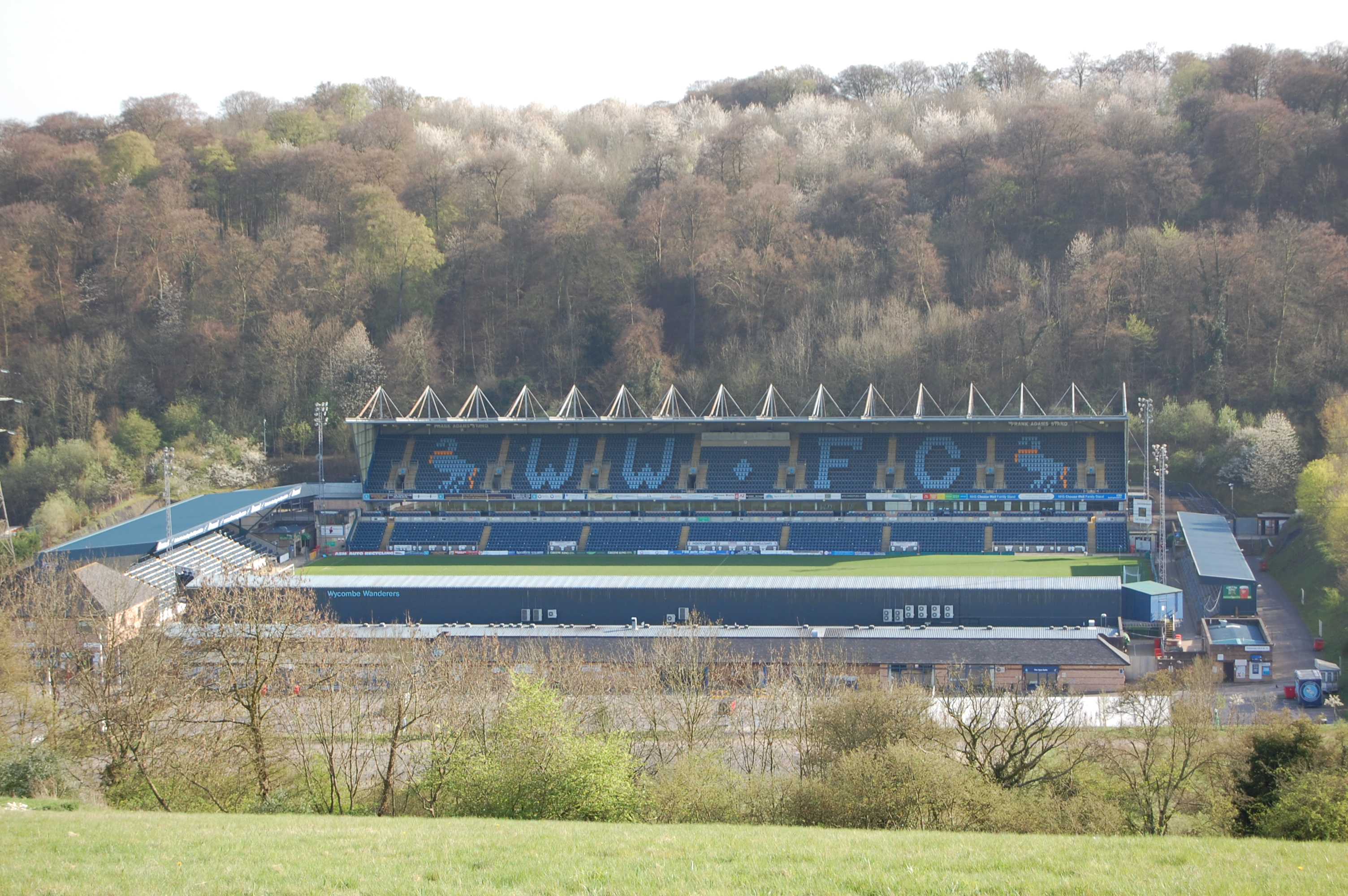
- Adams Park viewed from the north
- Interactive map of Adams Park
- Location: Hillbottom Road, High Wycombe, Buckinghamshire, England
- Coordinates: 51.6306°N 0.8002°W
- Owner: Wycombe Wanderers F.C.
- Operator: Wycombe Wanderers F.C.
- Capacity: 10,446 (original) approximately 9,448 (current licensed)
- Surface: Grass

Construction
- Opened: 1990
- Expanded: 1996, 2001
- Cost: £3.5 million

Tenants
- Wycombe Wanderers F.C. (1990–present); London Wasps (2002–2014); Reading Women (2016–2020)

Adams Park is a football stadium in High Wycombe, Buckinghamshire, and the home of Wycombe Wanderers F.C.. Opened in 1990 to replace the club’s former Loakes Park ground, it has a capacity of 10,446 and has also hosted professional rugby union and women’s football.

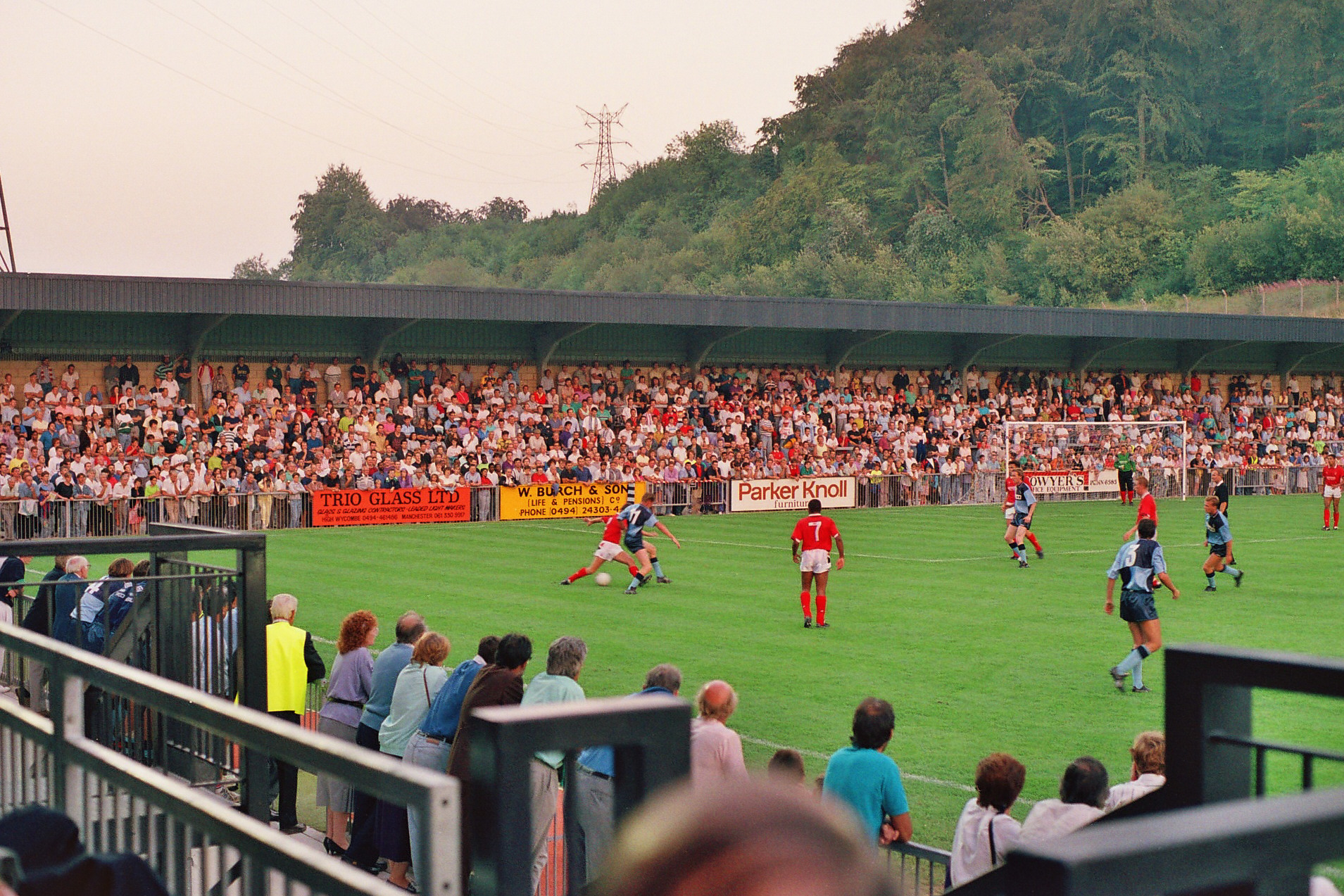
The first ever match at Adams Park, 1990

== History ==
=== Origins ===
Wycombe Wanderers had explored leaving Loakes Park since the 1960s, as the site had been earmarked for the expansion of the neighbouring Wycombe Hospital. The sale of Loakes Park to the health authority funded the construction of a new stadium at Hillbottom Road, two miles west of the town centre. The ground was named in honour of former captain Frank Adams, who had purchased and donated Loakes Park to the club.

=== Opening and early years ===
Adams Park opened for the 1990–91 season with a capacity of 6,000, including 1,267 seats in the Main Stand. The move coincided with a successful period for the club under manager Martin O’Neill, including victory in the FA Trophy final shortly after the stadium’s completion.

During the early 1990s, improvements to terracing and crush barriers increased capacity to around 9,500. In 1996 the Woodlands Stand was constructed, adding nearly 5,000 seats and giving the stadium its present four‑stand configuration. The Hillbottom Road End was converted from terracing to seating at the same time.

=== 2000s developments ===
In 2001 the Hillbottom Road End was expanded to increase away‑fan capacity, although the overall stadium capacity remained capped at 10,000 due to access limitations on the surrounding road network.

Between 2002 and 2014 the stadium was shared with London Wasps, prompting further upgrades to facilities and hospitality areas.

From 2003 to 2006 the ground was temporarily renamed the Causeway Stadium under a sponsorship agreement.

=== Recent years ===
Following the departure of London Wasps in 2014, Adams Park returned to being a primarily football‑focused venue, allowing the club to make a series of incremental improvements to supporter facilities and matchday operations. The stadium continued to host occasional rugby league and international youth fixtures, including England Under‑20 and Under‑21 matches.

During the mid‑2010s the ground underwent several safety and accessibility reviews, resulting in adjustments to the licensed capacities of the Beechdean Terrace and away end, along with upgrades to turnstiles, CCTV coverage and emergency‑access routes. Hospitality areas such as the Caledonian Suite and Woodlands Suite were refurbished to support increased non‑matchday use.

Between 2016 and 2020 Adams Park served as the home ground for Reading Women, hosting FA Women’s Super League fixtures and cup ties. The tenancy brought additional investment in pitch maintenance and media facilities, including upgraded broadcast positions and improved lighting levels.

Wycombe Wanderers’ promotion to the Championship in 2020 prompted further operational changes, including expanded media accommodation, enhanced technical areas and temporary adjustments to seating layouts during the COVID‑19 pandemic. Although matches were played behind closed doors for much of the season, the club implemented several supporter‑experience improvements that remained in place after restrictions were lifted.

In 2022 the media gantry in the Frank Adams Stand was renamed in honour of broadcaster Bill Turnbull, a long‑standing supporter of the club. The stadium continues to evolve through incremental upgrades, including digital ticketing infrastructure, improved concourse catering and ongoing pitch‑quality work.

== Stadium layout ==
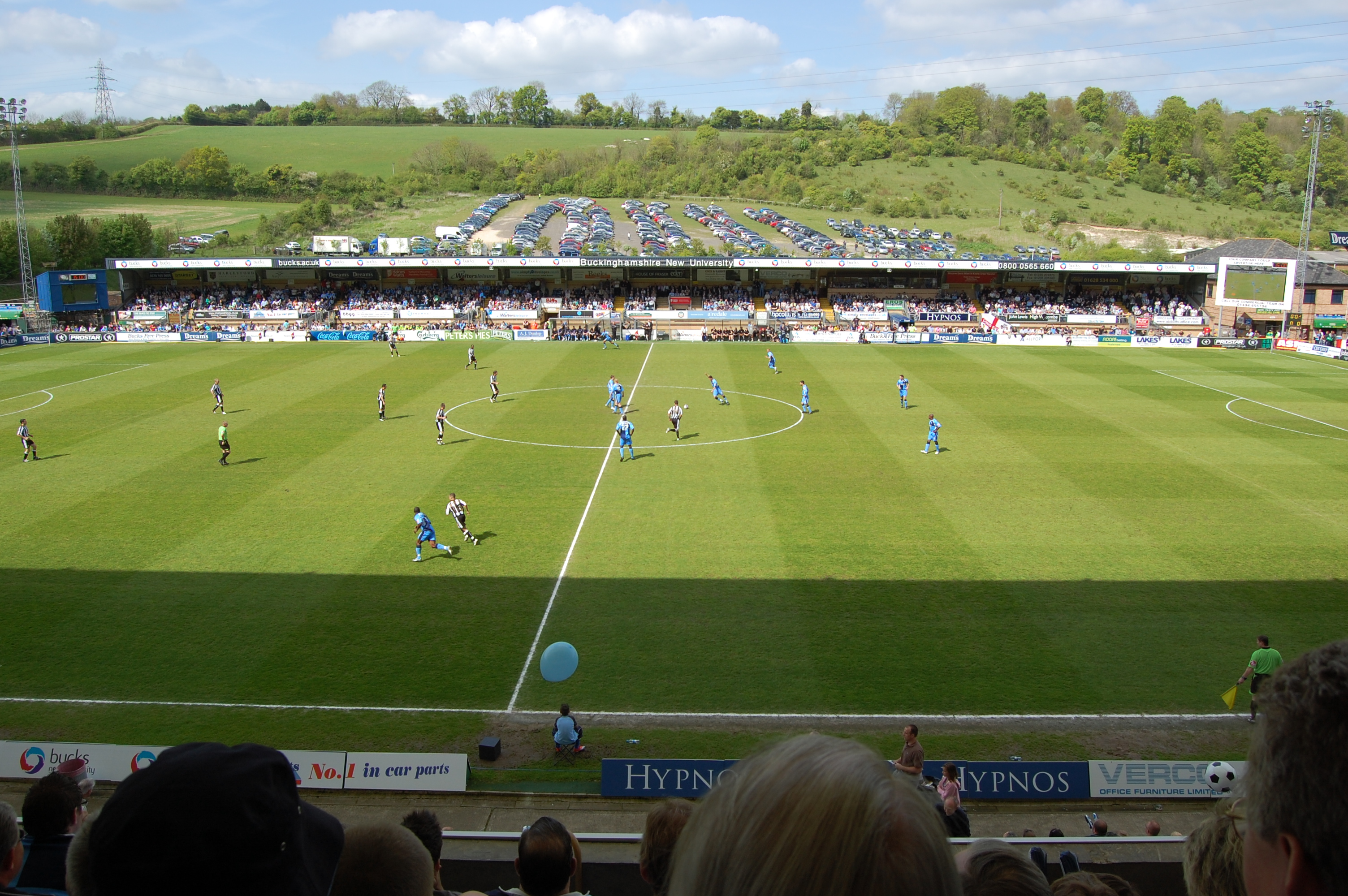
The Bucks New University Stand (Frank Adams Stand)

=== Frank Adams Stand (South) ===
Redeveloped in 1996 into a two‑tier structure, the stand contains hospitality boxes, media facilities and family seating. Its current capacity is 4,895.

=== Origin Stand (North) ===
Built in 1990, the stand seats 1,267 and houses the club offices, changing rooms, shop and catering areas.

=== WhiffAway Stand (East) ===
Allocated to visiting supporters, the stand was converted to seating in 1996 and expanded in 2002. It has a licensed capacity of 1,800.

=== Thames Air and Water Tech Terrace (West) ===
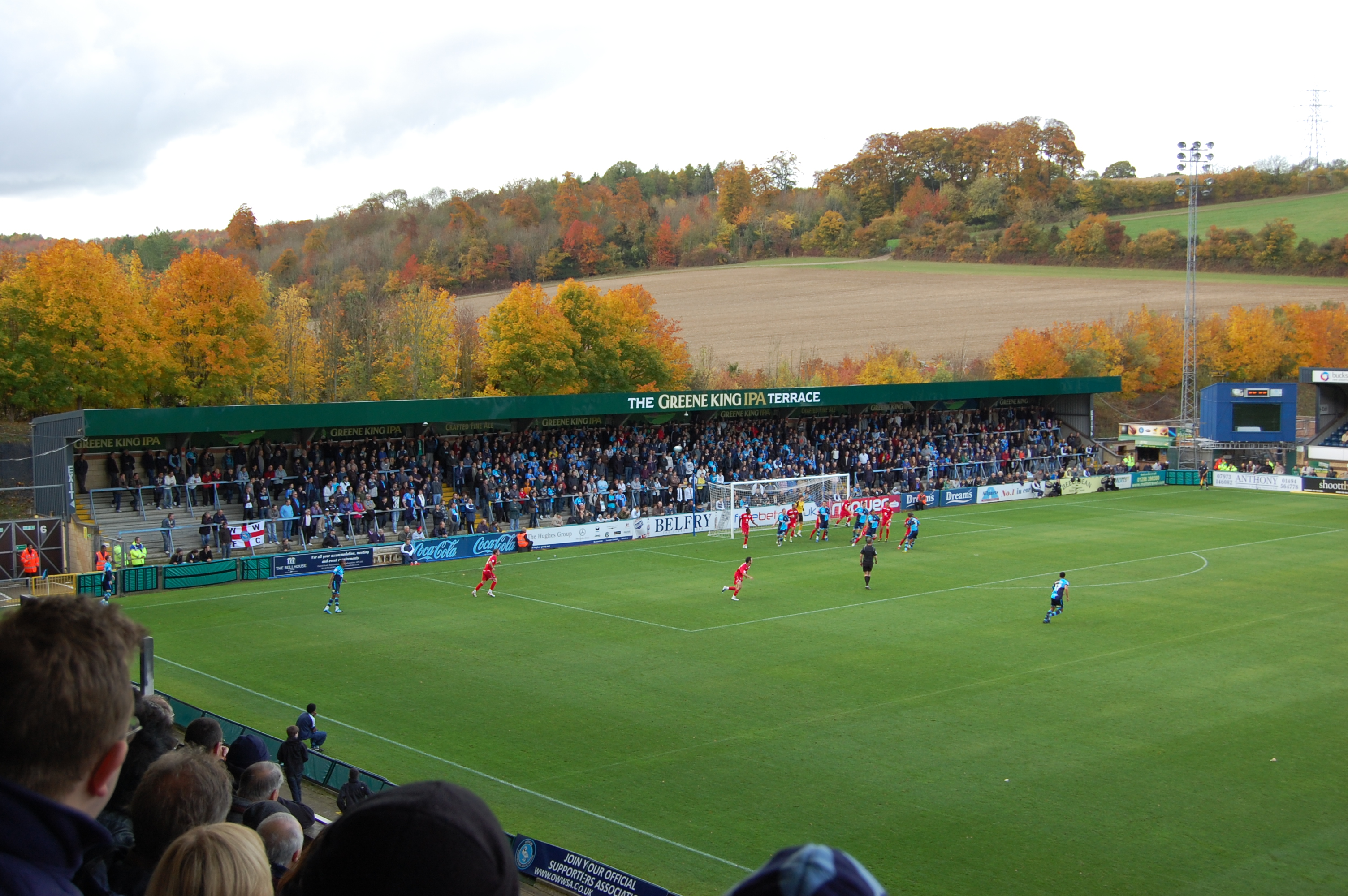
The Greene King IPA Terrace (Thames Air and Water Tech Terrace)

The home terrace, originally known as the Valley End, is the only remaining standing area in the stadium. Its licensed capacity currently stands at 1,494.

== Facilities ==
The stadium contains two hospitality suites—the Caledonian Suite and the Woodlands Suite—along with a supporters’ bar named Monty’s. A club shop is located between the East and North stands.

== Tenants ==
Wycombe Wanderers have played at Adams Park since its opening in 1990. London Wasps shared the ground between 2002 and 2014, while Reading Women used the stadium from 2016 to 2020.

== Transport and access ==
Adams Park is located at the end of Hillbottom Road, a single‑access route through the Sands Industrial Estate. The stadium is accessible by road from the M40 motorway, while matchday shuttle buses operate from High Wycombe railway station.

== Notable matches ==
- 17 November 1992 – England U19 2–1 Turkey U19
- 16 November 2005 – England U19 2–0 Switzerland U19
- 6 March 2006 – FA Women’s Premier League Cup final (Arsenal 1–2 Charlton Athletic)
- 10 January 2007 – League Cup semi‑final first leg (Wycombe 1–1 Chelsea)
- 2 May 2009 – Wycombe promoted to League One
- 7 May 2011 – Wycombe promoted to League One
- 21 March 2013 – England U21 3–0 Romania U21
- 6 April 2013 – First Super League match at Adams Park (London Broncos 20–46 Bradford)
- 19 November 2019 – England U20 3–0 Iceland U20
- 12 May 2026 - Real Madrid Castilla vs Borussia Dortmund II - Premier League International Cup Final
