= Ian Wolstenholme =

English footballer and manager (born 1943)

Personal information
- Full name: Ian Arthur Wolstenholme
- Date of birth: 12 January 1943 (age 83)
- Place of birth: Bradford, West Riding of Yorkshire, England
- Position: Goalkeeper

Youth career
- 1962–1963: St John's College (York)

Senior career*
Years	Team	Apps	(Gls)
1963–1965	York City	2	(0)
1965–1966	Sheffield		
1966–1970	Enfield		
1970–1973	Slough Town	82	(0)
1974	St Albans City	12	(0)
1975–1976	Bishop's Stortford		
1977	Harlow Town		
1983	Hitchin Town	2	(0)
Total		98+	(0+)

International career
1971	England amateur	2	(0)

Managerial career
- 1975–1976: Bishop's Stortford
- 1976–1982: Harlow Town
- 1982–1983: Hitchin Town
- * Club domestic league appearances and goals

Ian Arthur Wolstenholme (born 12 January 1943) is an English former football player and manager who played as a goalkeeper in the Football League for York City.

Wolstenholme started his playing career in 1962 in non-League football with St John's College (York), before signing Football League club York City the following year. He made three appearances before dropping back into non-League with Sheffield in 1965, to help combine playing with his career as a teacher. He signed for Enfield a year later, and with the club won multiple honours, including two Isthmian League titles and two FA Amateur Cups. Wolstenholme joined Slough Town in 1970 and won two Athenian League Premier Division titles with the club before having a short spell with St Albans City in 1974. He was capped twice by the England national amateur team in 1971.

His first managerial role came with Bishop's Stortford in 1975 before being appointed by Harlow Town the following year. Wolstenholme's team won the 1978–79 Isthmian League Division One title and reached the 1979–80 FA Cup fourth round before he resigned in 1982. He then had a short spell as manager of Hitchin Town before taking on a coaching role with St Margaretsbury.

== Life and career ==
=== Early life ===
Ian Arthur Wolstenholme was born on 12 January 1943 in Bradford, West Riding of Yorkshire, the son of Arthur. Wolstenholme was raised in Sheffield, West Riding of Yorkshire, where he attended Abbeydale Boys' Grammar School. He started playing for the school football team as an outside left before changing position to play as a goalkeeper, going on to represent Yorkshire Grammar Schools in the 1961–62 season.

=== Playing career ===
Wolstenholme attended St John's College in York, where he started his playing career in 1962 in non-League football with the college team, St John's College (York), which he captained. After finishing his studies, Wolstenholme signed for Football League club York City in October 1963, and during his time at the club served as third-choice goalkeeper behind Tommy Forgan and Tony Moor. He made his first-team debut on 6 April 1964 in a 3–1 home win over Darlington in a Fourth Division fixture. He finished the 1963–64 season, in which York finished 22nd of 24 teams in the Fourth Division, with two appearances. Wolstenholme did not make any appearances in the 1964–65 season, which saw York promoted to the Third Division after finishing third in the Fourth Division. His third and final appearance for York came on 22 September 1965 in a 4–1 defeat away to Millwall in the 1965–66 League Cup.

Wolstenholme started working as a physical education (PE) teacher at Hurlfield School in Sheffield, which led to him returning to non-League football with Sheffield in September 1965, as it was difficult for him to attend matches for York in an afternoon after refereeing school matches in the morning in Sheffield. He saved three penalty kicks in Sheffield's 1–1 draw away to Retford Town in a Yorkshire League Division Two match in January 1966. Reg Whittaker, writing for The Star Green 'Un, speculated that this "must be a record". Wolstenholme was part of the Sheffield team that finished third in the 1965–66 Yorkshire League Division Two and were promoted to Division One. While a Sheffield player, he also represented the Sheffield & Hallamshire County FA XI against a West Riding County FA XI in the Northern Counties Amateur Championship in February 1966, an FA Colts XI against a South Yorkshire Amateur League XI in March, and an England amateur XI in April in a trial match against a Combined Northern & Wearside Leagues XI. Wolstenholme's work at Hurlfield School in this time also drew praise, with Peter Markie of The Star Green 'Un writing in August that "Wolstenholme played a leading role in Hurlfield's development as one of the top soccer schools at all age levels in the city".

He started a new job as head of PE at Edmonton County School in London in 1966, which led to him signing for a local club in the form of Enfield. That year, Wolstenholme married. Wolstenholme had attracted interest from clubs in the Football League, but decided on Enfield to remaining playing as an amateur. He made his debut in August in a 4–1 away win over Maidstone United. He saved a penalty kick late into extra time against Skelmersdale United at Wembley Stadium in the final of the 1966–67 FA Amateur Cup on 22 April 1967, the match ending a 0–0 draw. The replay was held a week later at Maine Road, which Enfield won 3–0, with Wolstenholme again in goal. He also helped Enfield win the London Senior Cup in the same season. He had surgery to remove a cartilage during the 1967–68 season but returned to help Enfield win the Isthmian League title and finish as runners-up in the London Senior Cup. He won another Isthmian League title in the 1968–69 season, as well as the Middlesex Senior Cup. Wolstenholme helped Enfield win the Amateur Cup again in the 1969–70 season, when they beat Dagenham 5–1 in the final at Wembley on 4 April 1970.

Wolstenholme signed for Slough Town in 1970, and made his debut on 15 August in a 2–2 draw away to Tilbury in an Athenian League Premier Division match. He was a regular starter in the Slough team, and finished the 1970–71 season with 63 appearances. He was in the team that won the Berks & Bucks Senior Cup that season, beating Wycombe Wanderers 1–0 on 10 May in a replayed final after the first match ended 0–0. Shortly before the 1971–72 season started, Wolstenholme was capped twice by the England national amateur team in matches against Denmark and Iceland in August 1971. He again played regularly for Slough in the 1971–72 season, making 51 appearances as the team went on to win four trophies. These included the Athenian League Premier Division title, the Berks & Bucks Senior Cup, the Athenian League Cup, and the Premier Midweek Floodlight League. Wolstenholme made 56 appearances in the 1972–73 season, which proved to be his final with Slough, and again won the Athenian League Premier Division title and the Athenian League Cup. He was part of the team that finished as runners-up in the Amateur Cup, losing 1–0 to Walton & Hersham in the final at Wembley on 14 April 1973. Despite playing as a goalkeeper, Wolstenholme was described in the Bracknell Times in January 1973 as an "onfield tactician" and was noted for his ability to organise teammates when marking opposition players. He later played for St Albans City, making his debut on 26 January 1974 in a 2–1 defeat away to Clapton in the Isthmian League Division One, and finished the 1973–74 season with 13 appearances.

=== Managerial and coaching career ===
After retiring from playing, Wolstenholme was appointed manager of Bishop's Stortford in February 1975, with the team having been on a poor run of form in the Isthmian League Division One. His first win in charge came when Stortford beat Kingstonian 4–2 away on 8 March, which was the team's first victory in the Isthmian League Division One in nearly three months. Stortford fell to their largest margin of defeat of the season in its last match with a 5–1 home loss to Tooting & Mitcham United on 22 May, although they were praised in the Herts and Essex Observer for giving "their usual full-blooded performance" under Wolstenholme. The team finished the 1974–75 Isthmian League Division One 11th of 22 teams, which was followed by a 12th-place finish the following season. He made occasional playing appearances for Stortford between and 1975 and 1976. He resigned as manager on 21 October 1976, and was succeeded by Terry Woodrow, who was part of Wolstenholme's coaching staff. It was reported in the Herts and Essex Observer that his departure was "apparently over money for players".

Wolstenholme took over as manager of Harlow Town in late October 1976, with the team near the bottom of the Isthmian League Division Two table. Harlow finished the 1976–77 Isthmian League Division Two 17th of 22 teams, and were placed in the new Division One the following season after the league was reorganised from two divisions to three. Wolstenholme played himself in goal in a match in September 1977 when goalkeeper Paul Kitson was unavailable through injury. Harlow were in a midtable position around halfway through the season in January 1978 having struggled with injuries, and went on to finish the 1977–78 Isthmian League Division One in eighth place. Wolstenholme led Harlow to the 1978–79 Isthmian League Division One championship, with the team securing the title with five matches left to play. By winning the title, the club was promoted to the Premier Division. Harlow also won the Essex Senior Cup for the first time in the 1978–79 season, beating Tilbury 1–0 in the final on 5 May 1979 at Roots Hall. Wolstenholme's Harlow team reached the fourth round of the 1979–80 FA Cup, which is the furthest the club have progressed in the competition. Harlow twice beat opponents from higher divisions, with 1–0 home wins in replays against Third Division team Southend United in the second round and Leicester City of the Second Division in the third round. The win over Leicester was described by Terry Smith in the Daily Mirror as the "FA Cup sensation of the season". Harlow's run came to an end when being beaten 4–3 away by Watford in the fourth round. They finished the 1979–80 Isthmian League Premier Division season in 11th place. Harlow regularly had players unavailable through injury during the 1980–81 Isthmian League Premier Division season, in which they were involved in a fight against relegation before finishing 19th. Wolstenholme also led Harlow to the second round of the FA Trophy for the first time this season. He resigned in March 1982 with the team struggling and stated that "I always said I would go when we failed to progress".

Wolstenholme was appointed manager of Hitchin Town in December 1982 and his first match in charge was a 3–2 defeat away to Tooting & Mitcham United on 11 December in an Isthmian League Premier Division match. Wolstenholme briefly came out of playing retirement late in the 1982–83 season to make three appearances for Hitchin, his debut being a 6–1 home defeat to Hendon on 2 April 1983. Two days later, Wolstenholme played for Hitchin in the Herts Charity Cup final, in which his team lost 3–1 to one of his former clubs, Bishop's Stortford. His time with Hitchin came to a close at the end of the season. He would later serve as a coach at St Margaretsbury, working under manager Kelvin Hart, and during their time together the club won the 1992–93 Herts Senior Centenary Trophy. Wolstenholme left the club in 1994 due to other commitments.

== Career statistics ==
Appearances and goals by club, season and competition
Club	Season	League			FA Cup		League Cup		Other		Total	
Club	Season	Division	Apps	Goals	Apps	Goals	Apps	Goals	Apps	Goals	Apps	Goals
York City	1963–64	Fourth Division	2	0	0	0	0	0	—		2	0
York City	1964–65	Fourth Division	0	0	0	0	0	0	—		0	0
York City	1965–66	Third Division	0	0	—		1 (Note: Appearance in Football League Cup)	0	—		1	0
York City	Total		2	0	0	0	1	0	—		3	0
Slough Town	1970–71	Athenian League Premier Division	28	0	9	0	2 (Note: Appearances in Athenian League Cup)	0	24 (Note: Ten appearances in Premier Midweek Floodlight League, six appearances in Berks & Bucks Senior Cup, eight appearances in FA Amateur Cup)	0	63	0
Slough Town	1971–72	Athenian League Premier Division	24	0	3	0	4	0	20 (Note: Thirteen appearances in Premier Midweek Floodlight League, four appearances in FA Amateur Cup, three appearances in Berks & Bucks Senior Cup)	0	51	0
Slough Town	1972–73	Athenian League Premier Division	30	0	4	0	5	0	17 (Note: Eight appearances in Premier Midweek Floodlight League, six appearances in FA Amateur Cup, three appearances in Berks & Bucks Senior Cup)	0	56	0
Slough Town	Total		82	0	16	0	11	0	61	0	170	0
St Albans City	1973–74	Isthmian League Division One	12	0	—		—		1 (Note: Appearance in Herts Charity Cup)	0	13	0
Hitchin Town	1982–83	Isthmian League Premier Division	2	0	—		—		1	0	3	0
Career total			98	0	16	0	12	0	63	0	189	0

== Managerial statistics ==
Managerial record by team and tenure
Team	From	To	Record				
Team	From	To	P	W	D	L	Win %
Hitchin Town	11 December 1982 (Note: Dates of Wolstenholme's first and last matches as manager.)	7 May 1983	30	6	8	16	20.0
Total			30	6	8	16	20.0

== Honours ==
=== Player ===
Enfield

- Isthmian League: 1967–68, 1968–69
- FA Amateur Cup: 1966–67, 1969–70
- London Senior Cup: 1966–67
- Middlesex Senior Cup: 1968–69

Slough Town

- Athenian League Premier Division: 1971–72, 1972–73
- Premier Midweek Floodlight League: 1971–72
- Athenian League Cup: 1971–72, 1972–73
- Berks & Bucks Senior Cup: 1970–71, 1971–72

=== Manager ===
Harlow Town

- Isthmian League Division One: 1978–79
- Essex Senior Cup: 1978–79
