= List of Hitchin Town F.C. seasons =

Hitchin Town F.C. is an English semi-professional football club based in Hitchin, Hertfordshire. They compete in the Southern Football League's Premier Division. Founded in 1928 and known as "The Canaries", Hitchin Town have been based at Top Field since their foundation.

== Key ==
Top scorer and number of goals scored shown in bold when he was also top scorer for the division.

Key to league record

- Lvl = Level of the league in the current league system
- S = Numbers of seasons
- Pld = Games played
- W = Games won
- D = Games drawn
- L = Games lost
- GF = Goals for
- GA = Goals against
- GD = Goals difference
- Pts = Points
- Position = Position in the final league table
- Overall position = Overall club position in the English league system

Key to cup records

- Res = Final reached round
- Rec = Final club record in the form of wins-draws-losses
- PR = Premilinary round
- QR1 = Qualifying round 1
- QR2 = Qualifying round 2
- QR3 = Qualifying round 3
- QR4 = Qualifying round 4
- R1 = Round 1
- R2 = Round 2
- R3 = Round 3
- R4 = Round 4
- R5 = Round 5
- R6 = Round 6
- QF = Quarter-finals
- SF = Semi-finals
- RU = Runners-up
- W = Winners
- Average home attendance = for league games only

== Seasons ==
Year	League	Lvl	Pld	W	D	L	GF	GA	GD	Pts	Position	Leading league scorer		FA Cup		FA Trophy		Average home attendance
Year	League	Lvl	Pld	W	D	L	GF	GA	GD	Pts	Position	Name	Goals	Res	Rec	Res	Rec	Average home attendance
Record playing as Hitchin F.C.:
1871–72	Did not enter													R2	0-1-1	not held		
1872–73	Did not enter													R1	0-0-1	not held		
Did not enter any major competitions in the 1873–74 season
1874–75	Did not enter													R1	0-0-1	not held		
1875–76	Did not enter													scratched		not held		
Did not enter any major competitions between 1876 and 1887
1887–88	Did not enter													R1	0-0-1	not held		
1888–89	Did not enter													scratched		not held		
Did not enter any major competitions between 1889 and 1898
1898–99	Did not enter													QR1	1-0-1	not held		
1899–1900	Did not enter													QR1	0-0-1	not held		
1900–01	Did not enter													scratched		not held		
1901–02	South Eastern League													Did not enter		not held		
1902–03	South Eastern League													Did not enter		not held		
1903–04	South Eastern League		24	10	5	9	39	57	-18	25	**6th of 13**			QR3	2-0-1	not held		
1904–05	South Eastern League		24	8	3	13	33	51	-18	19	**8th of 13**			QR5	2-0-1	not held		
1905–06	South Eastern League		24	8	4	12	53	65	–12	20	**8th of 13**			QR2	1-1-1	not held		
1906–07	South Eastern League		24	8	3	13	35	79	–44	19	**10th of 13**			QR3	1-2-1	not held		
1907–08	South Eastern League		33	4	3	26	34	146	–112	11	**18th of 18**			PR	0-0-1	not held		
1908–09	Spartan League; Eastern Division		1	0	0	1	0	6	–6	0	**withdrew**			Did not enter		not held		
1909–10	Spartan League; Division B		10	3	0	7	12	29	–17	6	**5th of 6**			Did not enter		not held		
1910–11	Spartan League		18	1	2	15	17	74	–57	2	**10th of 11**; 2 points deducted			Did not enter		not held		
Record playing as Hitchin Town F.C.:
Club folded in 1911. Club re-founded in 1928.
1928–29	Spartan League; Division Two (East)	6	24							41	**2nd of 13**; Promoted					not held		
1929–30	Spartan League; Division One		26							31	**4th of 14**					not held		
1930–31	Spartan League; Division One		26							41	**2nd of 14**; Promoted					not held		
1931–32	Spartan League; Premier Division		24							29	**4th of 13**					not held		
1932–33	Spartan League; Premier Division		26							27	**8th of 14**					not held		
1933–34	Spartan League; Premier Division		26							28	**5th of 14**					not held		
1934–35	Spartan League															not held		
1935–36	Spartan League															not held		
1936–37	Spartan League															not held		
1937–38	Spartan League															not held		
1938–39	Spartan League															not held		
1939–40	Athenian League	4	2	2	0	0	14	2	+12	4	Season abandoned					not held		
No competitive football played during World War Two
1945–46	Athenian League		26	10	1	15	61	68	–7	21	**10th of 14**					not held		
1946–47	Athenian League		26	11	5	10	64	63	+1	27	**6th of 14**			QR4	3-1-1	not held		
1947–48	Athenian League		26	10	4	12	43	71	–18	24	**11th of 14**			QR2	2-0-1	not held		
1948–49	Athenian League		26	9	7	10	44	46	–2	25	**7th of 14**			QR3	3-2-1	not held		
1949–50	Athenian League		26	12	5	9	44	50	–6	29	**6th of 14**			QR3	3-0-1	not held		
1950–51	Athenian League		30	6	6	18	47	75	–28	18	**15th of 16**			QR3	3-0-1	not held		
1951–52	Athenian League		30	5	1	24	36	111	–75	11	**16th of 16**			QR1	0-0-1	not held		
1952–53	Athenian League		26	8	8	14	37	56	–19	20	**11th of 14**			QR3	3-0-1	not held		
1953–54	Athenian League		26	16	3	7	58	32	+26	35	**2nd of 14**			QR4	3-2-1	not held		
1954–55	Athenian League		26	6	9	11	44	60	–16	21	**12th of 14**			QR1	1-0-1	not held		
1955–56	Athenian League		28	7	4	17	47	74	–27	18	**15th of 15**			QR4	3-1-1	not held		
1956–57	Athenian League		28	10	5	13	67	73	–6	25	**10th of 15**			QR3	3-1-1	not held		
1957–58	Athenian League		30	12	6	12	52	65	–13	30	**9th of 16**			PR	0-0-1	not held		
1958–59	Athenian League		30	8	8	14	37	52	–15	24	**14th of 16**			R1	4-2-1	not held		
1959–60	Athenian League		30	11	6	13	55	57	–5	28	**10th of 16**			QR1	0-0-1	not held		
1960–61	Athenian League		30	15	6	9	81	52	+29	36	**5th of 16**			R1	4-0-1	not held		
1961–62	Athenian League		30	15	4	11	85	71	+14	34	**6th of 16**			QR4	3-0-1	not held		
1962–63	Athenian League		30	16	3	11	74	61	+13	35	**5th of 16**			QR2	1-1-1	not held		
1964–65	Isthmian League	5	38	13	9	16	61	66	–5	35	**11th of 20**			QR3	2-1-1	not held		
1965–66	Isthmian League	5	38	6	8	24	57	118	–61	20	**18th of 20**			QR2	1-0-1	not held		
1966–67	Isthmian League	5	38	8	6	24	39	89	–50	22	**19th of 20**			QR1	0-0-1	not held		
1967–68	Isthmian League	5	38	14	9	15	61	73	–12	37	**12th of 20**			QR3	2-1-1	not held		
1968–69	Isthmian League	5	38	23	10	5	67	41	+26	56	**2nd of 20**			QR3	2-0-1	not held		
1969–70	Isthmian League	5	38	19	10	9	71	40	+31	48	**7th of 20**			QR3	2-0-1	Did not enter		
1970–71	Isthmian League	5	40	12	9	17	46	60	–14	33	**12th of 21**			QR2	1-2-1	Did not enter		
1971–72	Isthmian League	5	42	17	10	13	68	66	+2	44	**10th of 22**			QR1	0-1-1	Did not enter		
1972–73	Isthmian League	5	42	15	9	18	52	64	–12	39	**16th of 22**			QR2	2-0-1	Did not enter		
1973–74	Isthmian League; Division One	5	42	15	10	17	68	73	–5	55	**13th of 22**			R2	5-4-1	Did not enter		
1974–75	Isthmian League; Division One	5	42	15	10	17	57	71	–14	55	**12th of 22**			R1	4-3-1	R1	4-2-1	
1975–76	Isthmian League; Division One	5	42	13	11	18	45	57	–12	50	**16th of 22**			QR4	0-0-1	QR1	0-1-1	
1976–77	Isthmian League; Division One	5	42	19	6	17	60	66	–6	63	**9th of 22**			R2	2-5-1	R3	5-2-1	
1977–78	Isthmian League; Premier Division	5	42	20	9	13	69	53	+16	69	**5th of 22**			QR4	0-1-1	R1	1-1-1	
1978–79	Isthmian League; Premier Division	5	42	12	11	19	59	71	–12	47	**16th of 22**			R1	1-0-1	QR3	0-0-1	
1979–80	Isthmian League; Premier Division	6	42	13	15	14	54	68	–14	54	**12th of 22**			QR4	0-0-1	QR2	1-1-1	
1980–81	Isthmian League; Premier Division	6	42	14	10	18	64	52	+12	52	**13th of 22**			QR4	3-0-1	R3	5-0-1	
1981–82	Isthmian League; Premier Division	6	42	12	11	19	56	77	–21	47	**18th of 22**			QR1	0-0-1	R1	1-0-1	
1982–83	Isthmian League; Premier Division	6	42	11	9	22	49	77	–28	42	**20th of 22**			QR1	0-0-1	QR3	0-0-1	
1983–84	Isthmian League; Premier Division	6	42	16	15	11	58	57	+1	63	**6th of 22**			QR4	3-0-1	QR3	0-0-1	
1984–85	Isthmian League; Premier Division	6	42	10	15	17	55	70	–15	45	**20th of 22**			QR2	1-1-1	QR1	0-0-1	
1985–86	Isthmian League; Premier Division	6	42	11	14	17	53	69	–16	47	**17th of 22**			QR2	1-3-1	QR1	0-0-1	
1986–87	Isthmian League; Premier Division	6	42	13	5	24	56	69	–13	44	**20th of 22**			QR1	0-0-1	R2	4-2-1	
1987–88	Isthmian League; Premier Division	6	42	10	8	24	46	79	–33	38	**21st of 22**; Relegated			QR1	0-0-1	QR3	2-1-1	
1988–89	Isthmian League; Division One	7	40	21	11	8	60	32	+28	74	**4th of 21**			QR1	1-0-1	QR1	0-0-1	
1989–90	Isthmian League; Division One	7	42	22	13	7	60	30	+30	79	**4th of 22**			QR3	3-0-1	QR3	1-1-1	
1990–91	Isthmian League; Division One	7	42	21	9	12	78	50	+28	72	**5th of 22**			QR1	0-1-1	QR2	0-1-1	
1991–92	Isthmian League; Division One	7	40	17	10	13	55	45	+10	61	**8th of 21**			PR	0-1-1	QR2	1-0-1	
1992–93	Isthmian League; Division One	7	40	25	7	8	67	29	+38	80	**1st of 21**; Promoted			QR2	2-0-1	QR2	1-0-1	
1993–94	Isthmian League; Premier Division	6	42	21	7	14	81	56	+25	70	**8th of 22**			QR1	0-0-1	QR1	0-0-1	
1994–95	Isthmian League; Premier Division	6	42	18	12	12	68	59	+11	66	**5th of 22**			R2	5-3-1	QR3	0-0-1	
1995–96	Isthmian League; Premier Division	6	42	10	10	22	41	74	−33	40	**18th of 22**			R2	2-0-1	QR3	0-0-1	
1996–97	Isthmian League; Premier Division	6	42	15	7	20	67	73	−6	52	**14th of 22**			QR4	0-0-1	QR1	0-0-1	
1997–98	Isthmian League; Premier Division	6	42	8	15	19	45	62	−17	39	**21st of 22**; Relegated			QR1	0-0-1	QR3	2-0-1	
1998–99	Isthmian League; Division One	7	42	25	10	7	75	38	+37	85	**2nd of 22**; Promoted			QR1	0-0-1	R5	3-2-1	
1999–2000	Isthmian League; Premier Division	6	42	13	11	18	59	72	−13	50	**16th of 22**			QR4	2-0-1	R1	0-1-1	
2000–01	Isthmian League; Premier Division	6	42	18	5	19	72	69	+3	59	**10th of 22**			QR2	0-2-0	R2	1-1-1	
2001–02	Isthmian League; Premier Division	6	42	15	10	17	73	81	−8	55	**11th of 22**			QR4	2-2-1	R1	0-0-1	
2002–03	Isthmian League; Premier Division	6	46	15	13	18	69	67	+2	58	**14th of 24**			QR2	0-0-1	R2	1-0-1	
2003–04	Isthmian League; Premier Division	6	46	13	8	25	55	89	−34	47	**20th of 24**; Transferred to SFL			QR2	0-1-1	R2	1-1-1	
2004–05	Southern Football League; Premier Division	7	42	13	9	20	55	77	−22	48	**18th of 22**			QR1	0-0-1	R1	0-0-1	
2005–06	Southern Football League; Premier Division	7	42	13	12	17	59	76	−17	51	**14th of 22**			QR3	2-0-1	QR2	1-0-1	
2006–07	Southern Football League; Premier Division	7	42	16	9	17	55	68	−13	57	**11th of 22**			QR3	1-5-0	QR1	0-0-1	294
2007–08	Southern Football League; Premier Division	7	42	12	11	19	46	61	−15	47	**18th of 22**			QR4	3-2-1	QR3	2-1-1	316
2008–09	Southern Football League; Premier Division	7	42	10	10	22	57	79	−22	40	**20th of 22**; Relegated			QR3	2-1-1	QR2	1-0-1	338
2009–10	Southern Football League; Division One Midlands	8	42	31	7	4	91	36	+55	100	**2nd of 22**; Lost in playoff semifinal			QR1	1-1-1	QR3	3-1-1	
2010–11	Southern Football League; Division One Central	8	42	26	9	7	107	44	+63	87	**2nd of 22**; Promoted through playoffs			QR2	2-1-1	PR	0-0-1	
2011–12	Southern Football League; Premier Division	7	42	13	12	17	54	57	−3	51	**14th of 22**	John Frendo	23	QR1	0-0-1	QR2	1-0-1	388
2012–13	Southern Football League; Premier Division	7	42	15	7	20	62	68	−6	52	**13th of 22**	John Frendo	31	QR3	2-2-1	QR3	2-1-1	338
2013–14	Southern Football League; Premier Division	7	44	16	11	17	63	52	+11	59	**13th of 23**	Callum Donnelly; Simon Martin	10	QR1	0-1-1	QR1	0-1-1	342
2014–15	Southern Football League; Premier Division	7	44	20	10	14	78	63	+15	70	**9th of 23**	Jonny McNamara	9	QR2	1-0-1	QR1	0-1-1	391
2015–16	Southern Football League; Premier Division	7	46	24	12	10	78	50	+28	84	**3rd of 24**; Lost in playoff semifinal	Jonny McNamara	17	QR3	2-2-1	QR3	2-1-1	423
2016–17	Southern Football League; Premier Division	7	46	24	14	8	79	45	+34	86	**4th of 24**; Lost in playoff final	Robbie Burns	16	QR2	1-1-1	R1	3-1-1	478
