= 1972–73 Athenian League =

Athenian League
- Season: 1972–73

The 1972–73 Athenian League season was the 50th in the history of Athenian League. The league consisted of 46 teams.

== Premier Division ==
Athenian League Premier Division
- Season: 1972–73
- Champions: Slough Town
- Promoted: 8 clubs to Isthmian League Division Two
- Relegated: None

The division featured two new teams, promoted from last season's Division One:

- Harlow Town (1st)
- Croydon Amateurs (2nd)

=== League table ===
Pos	Team	Pld	W	D	L	GF	GA	GR	Pts	Qualification
1	Slough Town (C, P)	30	22	4	4	74	23	3.217	48	Founder members of Isthmian League Division Two
2	Dagenham (P)	30	17	9	4	47	18	2.611	43	Founder members of Isthmian League Division Two
3	Tilbury (P)	30	17	9	4	57	35	1.629	43	Founder members of Isthmian League Division Two
4	Harlow Town (P)	30	18	5	7	54	31	1.742	41	Founder members of Isthmian League Division Two
5	Erith & Belvedere	30	14	8	8	35	28	1.250	36	
6	Harwich & Parkeston (P)	30	11	10	9	44	38	1.158	32	Founder members of Isthmian League Division Two
7	Aveley (P)	30	11	10	9	34	34	1.000	32	Founder members of Isthmian League Division Two
8	Cheshunt	30	13	6	11	36	36	1.000	32	
9	Maidenhead United (P)	30	12	6	12	43	41	1.049	30	Founder members of Isthmian League Division Two
10	Southall (P)	30	12	5	13	30	38	0.789	29	Founder members of Isthmian League Division Two
11	Boreham Wood	30	9	7	14	30	34	0.882	25	
12	Lewes	30	5	11	14	28	45	0.622	21	
13	Croydon Amateurs	30	5	11	14	21	37	0.568	21	
14	Hornchurch	30	6	6	18	23	45	0.511	18	
15	Redhill	30	3	9	18	20	49	0.408	15	
16	Wembley	30	4	6	20	26	70	0.371	14	

Source: rsssf.com
Rules for classification: 1) points; 2) goal difference; 3) number of goals scored.
(C) Champions; (P) Promoted

=== Stadia and locations ===
Locations of the Athenian League Premier Division clubs
Greater London Athenian League Premier Division football clubs

Club	Stadium
Aveley	The Mill Field
Boreham Wood	Meadow Park
Cheshunt	Cheshunt Stadium
Croydon Amateurs	Croydon Sports Arena
Dagenham	Victoria Road
Erith & Belvedere	Park View
Harlow Town	Harlow Sportcentre
Harwich & Parkeston	Royal Oak
Hornchurch	Hornchurch Stadium
Lewes	The Dripping Pan
Maidenhead United	York Road
Redhill	Kiln Brow
Slough Town	Wexham Park
Southall	Robert Parker Stadium
Tilbury	Chadfields
Wembley	Vale Farm

== Division One ==
Athenian League Division One
- Season: 1972–73
- Champions: Horsham
- Promoted: 6 clubs to Isthmian League Division Two; 8 clubs to new Division One
- Relegated: None

The division featured 3 new teams:

- 1 relegated from last season's Premier Division:
  - Grays Athletic (16th)
- 2 promoted from last season's Division Two:
  - Staines Town (1st)
  - Worthing (2nd)

=== League table ===
Pos	Team	Pld	W	D	L	GF	GA	GR	Pts	Promotion or qualification
1	Horsham (C, P)	30	24	3	3	74	24	3.083	51	Founder members of Isthmian League Division Two
2	Staines Town (P)	30	20	3	7	54	32	1.688	43	Founder members of Isthmian League Division Two
3	Grays Athletic (P)	30	16	5	9	33	27	1.222	37	Promotion to new Division One
4	Hounslow (P)	30	13	7	10	49	36	1.361	33	Promotion to new Division One
5	Wokingham Town (P)	30	11	7	12	51	47	1.085	29	Founder members of Isthmian League Division Two
6	Carshalton Athletic (P)	30	11	7	12	41	42	0.976	29	Founder members of Isthmian League Division Two
7	Eastbourne United (P)	30	11	7	12	32	38	0.842	29	Promotion to new Division One
8	Letchworth Town (P)	30	10	9	11	32	43	0.744	29	Promotion to new Division One
9	Marlow (P)	30	11	6	13	40	38	1.053	28	Promotion to new Division One
10	Chesham United (P)	30	11	5	14	41	41	1.000	27	Founder members of Isthmian League Division Two
11	Edmonton (P)	30	9	9	12	41	45	0.911	27	Promotion to new Division One
12	Finchley (P)	30	10	6	14	43	46	0.935	26	Founder members of Isthmian League Division Two
13	Herne Bay (P)	30	10	6	14	45	62	0.726	26	Promotion to new Division One
14	Worthing (P)	30	7	10	13	29	42	0.690	24	Promotion to new Division One
15	Aylesbury United	30	8	6	16	38	58	0.655	22	
16	Dorking	30	6	8	16	26	48	0.542	20	

Source: rsssf.com
Rules for classification: 1) points; 2) goal difference; 3) number of goals scored.
(C) Champions; (P) Promoted

=== Stadia and locations ===
Locations of the Athenian League Division One clubs
Greater London Athenian League Division One football clubs

Club	Stadium
Aylesbury United	Buckingham Road
Carshalton Athletic	War Memorial Sports Ground
Chesham United	The Meadow
Dorking	Meadowbank Stadium
Eastbourne United	The Oval
Finchley	Summers Lane
Edmonton	Coles Park
Grays Athletic	New Recreation Ground
Herne Bay	Winch's Field
Horsham	Queen Street
Hounslow	Denbigh Road
Letchworth Town	Baldock Road
Marlow	Alfred Davis Memorial Ground
Staines Town	Wheatsheaf Park
Wokingham Town	Cantley Park
Worthing	Woodside Road

== Division Two ==
Athenian League Division Two
- Season: 1972–73
- Champions: Ruislip Manor
- Promoted: Hampton to Isthmian League Division Two; 2 clubs to new Division One; 10 clubs to new Division Two
- Relegated: None

The division featured no new teams.

Ruislip Manor and Ware promoted two divisions.

=== League table ===
Pos	Team	Pld	W	D	L	GF	GA	GR	Pts	Promotion or qualification
1	Ruislip Manor (C, P)	26	18	6	2	51	20	2.550	42	Promotion to new Division One
2	Hampton (P)	26	14	8	4	39	20	1.950	36	Founder member of Isthmian League Division Two
3	Ware (P)	26	14	8	4	61	38	1.605	36	Promotion to new Division One
4	Leyton (P)	26	14	7	5	52	22	2.364	35	Promotion to new Division Two
5	Edgware (P)	26	11	10	5	32	20	1.600	32	Promotion to new Division Two
6	Rainham Town (P)	26	10	11	5	46	36	1.278	31	Promotion to new Division Two
7	Uxbridge (P)	26	13	4	9	42	27	1.556	30	Promotion to new Division Two
8	Addlestone (P)	26	11	7	8	42	28	1.500	29	Promotion to new Division Two
9	Harrow Borough (P)	26	12	5	9	43	30	1.433	29	Promotion to new Division Two
10	Hemel Hempstead (P)	26	5	7	14	26	53	0.491	17	Promotion to new Division Two
11	Windsor & Eton (P)	26	5	4	17	29	54	0.537	14	Promotion to new Division Two
12	Eastbourne Town (P)	26	6	2	18	24	51	0.471	14	Promotion to new Division Two
13	Epsom & Ewell	26	4	6	16	24	54	0.444	14	Left to join Surrey Senior League
14	Wingate (P)	26	2	1	23	21	79	0.266	5	Promotion to new Division Two

Source: rsssf.com
Rules for classification: 1) points; 2) goal difference; 3) number of goals scored.
(C) Champions; (P) Promoted

=== Stadia and locations ===
Locations of the Athenian League Division Two clubs
Greater London Athenian League Division Two football clubs

Club	Stadium
Addlestone	Liberty Lane
Eastbourne Town	The Saffrons
Edgware	White Lion
Epsom & Ewell	Merland Rise
Hampton	Beveree Stadium
Harrow Borough	Earlsmead Stadium
Hemel Hempstead	Vauxhall Road
Leyton	Leyton Stadium
Rainham Town	Deri Park
Ruislip Manor	Grosvenor Vale
Uxbridge	Honeycroft
Ware	Wodson Park
Windsor & Eton	Stag Meadow
Wingate	Hall Lane
