= 1973–74 Isthmian League =

The 1973–74 season was the 59th in the history of the Isthmian League, an English football competition.

It was the first season in which the league was split into two divisions after sixteen new clubs joined the new Division Two. It was also the first season in which the Isthmian League used three points for a win.

Wycombe Wanderers won Division One, whilst Dagenham won Division Two.

== Division One ==
Isthmian League Division One
- Season: 1973–74
- Champions: Wycombe Wanderers
- Relegated: Corinthian-Casuals; St Albans City
- Matches: 462
- Goals: 1,263 (2.73 per match)

=== League table ===
Pos	Team	Pld	W	D	L	GF	GA	GR	Pts	Relegation
1	Wycombe Wanderers	42	27	9	6	96	34	2.824	90	
2	Hendon	42	25	13	4	63	20	3.150	88	
3	Bishop's Stortford	42	26	9	7	78	26	3.000	87	
4	Dulwich Hamlet	42	22	11	9	71	38	1.868	77	
5	Leatherhead	42	23	6	13	81	44	1.841	75	
6	Walton & Hersham	42	20	12	10	68	50	1.360	72	
7	Woking	42	22	6	14	63	55	1.145	72	
8	Leytonstone	42	20	9	13	63	44	1.432	69	
9	Ilford	42	20	8	14	60	44	1.364	68	
10	Hayes	42	17	14	11	65	43	1.512	65	
11	Oxford City	42	15	16	11	45	47	0.957	61	
12	Sutton United	42	13	16	13	51	52	0.981	55	
13	Hitchin Town	42	15	10	17	68	73	0.932	55	
14	Barking	42	14	12	16	57	58	0.983	54	
15	Kingstonian	42	12	15	15	47	46	1.022	51	
16	Tooting & Mitcham United	42	14	9	19	57	62	0.919	51	
17	Enfield	42	13	11	18	50	57	0.877	50	
18	Walthamstow Avenue	42	11	13	18	46	62	0.742	46	
19	Bromley	42	7	9	26	37	81	0.457	30	
20	Clapton	42	8	3	31	36	128	0.281	27	
21	St Albans City	42	4	7	31	30	92	0.326	19	Relegated to Division Two
22	Corinthian-Casuals	42	3	4	35	31	107	0.290	13	Relegated to Division Two

Source: fchd.com rsssf.com
Rules for classification: 1) points; 2) goal ratio.

=== Stadia and locations ===
Locations of the Division One clubs
Greater London Division One football clubs

Club	Stadium
Barking	Mayesbrook Park
Bishop's Stortford	Woodside Park
Bromley	Hayes Lane
Clapton	The Old Spotted Dog Ground
Corinthian-Casuals	King George's Field
Dulwich Hamlet	Champion Hill
Enfield	Southbury Road
Hayes	Church Road
Hendon	Claremont Road
Hitchin Town	Top Field
Ilford	Victoria Road
Kingstonian	Kingsmeadow
Leatherhead	Fetcham Grove
Leytonstone	Granleigh Road
Oxford City	Marsh Lane
St Albans City	Clarence Park
Sutton United	Gander Green Lane
Tooting & Mitcham United	Imperial Fields
Walthamstow Avenue	Green Pond Road
Walton & Hersham	The Sports Ground
Woking	The Laithwaite Community Stadium
Wycombe Wanderers	Adams Park

== Division Two ==
Isthmian League Division Two
- Season: 1973–74
- Champions: Dagenham
- Promoted: Dagenham; Slough Town
- Matches: 240
- Goals: 657 (2.74 per match)

It was the first season of Division Two, fifteen clubs joined the Isthmian League from different divisions of the Athenian League, while Hertford Town were transferred from the Eastern Counties League.

=== League table ===
Pos	Team	Pld	W	D	L	GF	GA	GR	Pts	Promotion
1	Dagenham	30	22	4	4	68	23	2.957	70	Promoted to Division One
2	Slough Town	30	18	6	6	46	23	2.000	60	Promoted to Division One
3	Hertford Town	30	17	5	8	46	29	1.586	56	
4	Chesham United	30	16	6	8	61	43	1.419	54	
5	Aveley	30	16	5	9	50	28	1.786	53	
6	Tilbury	30	14	5	11	47	36	1.306	47	
7	Maidenhead United	30	12	11	7	36	30	1.200	47	
8	Horsham	30	12	9	9	47	35	1.343	45	
9	Harwich & Parkeston	30	11	9	10	46	41	1.122	42	
10	Staines Town	30	10	8	12	34	41	0.829	38	
11	Carshalton Athletic	30	8	8	14	34	51	0.667	32	
12	Hampton	30	6	10	14	33	51	0.647	28	
13	Harlow Town	30	6	9	15	33	48	0.688	27	
14	Finchley	30	6	7	17	29	52	0.558	25	
15	Southall	30	3	10	17	17	52	0.327	19	
16	Wokingham Town	30	3	8	19	30	74	0.405	17	

Source: fchd.com rsssf.com
Rules for classification: 1) points; 2) goal ratio.

=== Stadia and locations ===
Locations of the Division Two clubs
Greater London Division Two football clubs

Club	Stadium
Aveley	The Mill Field
Carshalton Athletic	War Memorial Sports Ground
Chesham United	The Meadow
Dagenham	Victoria Road
Finchley	Summers Lane
Hampton	Beveree Stadium
Harlow Town	Harlow Sportcentre
Harwich & Parkeston	Royal Oak
Hertford Town	Hertingfordbury Park
Horsham	Queen Street
Maidenhead United	York Road
Slough Town	Wexham Park
Southall	Robert Parker Stadium
Staines Town	Wheatsheaf Park
Tilbury	Chadfields
Wokingham Town	Cantley Park
