= Ray Snowball =

English footballer (1932–2025)

Personal information
- Full name: Raymond Snowball
- Date of birth: 10 March 1932
- Place of birth: Sunderland, England
- Date of death: 6 March 2025 (aged 92)
- Position: Goalkeeper

Youth career
- Silksworth Colliery Welfare

Senior career*
Years	Team	Apps	(Gls)
19??–1953	Bishop Auckland		
1953–196?	Crook Town		
1964–1967	Darlington	13	(0)
- * Club domestic league appearances and goals

Raymond Snowball (10 March 1932 – 6 March 2025) was an English amateur footballer who played as a goalkeeper in the Football League for Darlington. He is better known for his achievements while playing for Crook Town, with whom he won three FA Amateur Cups, in 1959, 1962 and 1964.

== Personal life ==
Raymond Snowball was born on 10 March 1932 in Sunderland, which was then in County Durham, and raised in the Silksworth district. He served with the 7th Training Regiment Royal Corps of Signals, based at Catterick, during his period of National Service in the early 1950s. Snowball went into teaching, and finished his career as head of East Boldon Primary School.

In 2001, streets in a new housing estate in Crook were named after Snowball and Crook Town teammates Eddie Appleby and Jimmy McMillan. In March 2022, the Durham Amateur Football Trust organised a 90th-birthday celebration for Snowball at Crook Town's ground.

Snowball died on 6 March 2025 at the age of 92.

== Football career ==
=== Early career ===
As a youngster, Snowball played football for Silksworth Colliery Welfare juniors. While on National Service, he kept goal for his regimental team as they reached the Army Cup Final in 1952, only to lose 2–1 to the 67th Training Regiment Royal Armoured Corps featuring Leeds United's Wales international John Charles. He was recruited for Bishop Auckland by an Army teammate, where he impressed enough to attract attention from Football League clubs and a trial with FA Cup-holders Blackpool, but was unable to dislodge the club's established first-team goalkeeper, so was keen to sign for Crook Town. Initially deputy to Fred Jarrie, Snowball became the club's regular first choice for the 1954–55 season, which caused Jarrie to leave for Willington. After Crook were eliminated from that season's Amateur Cup by Willington with a goal attributable to Snowball's error, in a match in which Jarrie performed well, the Manchester Guardian reported "misgivings at Crook about the club's decision".

=== Crook Town ===
Snowball missed the start of the next season after he, Crook's other goalkeeper, Jack Snowden, and another teammate were injured while on holiday in the Alps when their car went down an embankment. He went on to establish himself in the side. In 1958–59, Crook beat Ferryhill Athletic in the first round of the Amateur Cup despite losing Snowball mid-match to a broken nose. They progressed to the final in which they beat Barnet 3–2, a victory masterminded by Seamus O'Connell, twice an Amateur Cup winner with Bishop Auckland, despite his having been in a car crash on the way to the match. Crook also won the Northern League title that year. They reached the second round of the 1959–60 FA Cup, but lost to Football League club York City in a match in which, according to the Times' match report, "only the goalkeepers ... enhanced their reputations, [Snowball] distinguishing himself particularly with brilliant saves from Addison and Edgar".

Crook won the Amateur Cup again in 1962, beating Hounslow in a one-sided replay at Ayresome Park, Middlesbrough, after the Wembley final was drawn 1–1. The equaliser came when Snowball collected a header from a corner, and according to the Times, Hounslow's Bruce Patterson "arrived to charge everything in sight over the line", or as Snowball himself recalls, Patterson "launched himself at me, striking me on the back of the arm. The ball shot out of my arms into the net. I was surprised referee Jack Taylor allowed it to stand." Patterson said afterwards, "I thought Snowball would punch clear, but I took a chance and rushed in. I caught him beautifully!"

In the first round of the 1962–63 FA Cup, Crook took a 4–1 lead away to Third Division team Hull City, only to lose 5–4. Forty years later, Snowball spoke of how "shattered and bitterly disappointed" they had been, and how despite advancing age he had never been able to forget it. That season they again won the Northern League, and the following year reached the Amateur Cup yet again, despite an error-strewn performance by Snowball against Barnet in the semi-final. In the final, Enfield were ahead by a goal scored when Roger Day took advantage of Snowball and Peter Garbutt "each wait[ing] for the other to clear a back pass on the byline". Then their goalkeeper, Malcolm Mitchell, broke his arm diving at the feet of an oncoming forward. No substitutes were allowed, winger Roy Thomas went in goal, and Mitchell played the second half at centre forward. The depleted Enfield team were unable to defend their lead, and Snowball, whose safe handling was noted by the Daily Express, won his third Amateur Cup. Snowball continued to play for Crook Town until at least 1966.

=== Darlington ===
Between 1964 and 1967, Snowball played 13 matches in the Football League for Fourth Division club Darlington. He stood in for Jimmy O'Neill, and after O'Neill left the club in February 1965, and was an occasional deputy when Tony Moor was unavailable. As such, he was a fringe member of the squad promoted in the 1965–66 season, the club's first promotion for 40 years. He retired from football after leaving Darlington.

=== Representative football ===
As well as club football, Snowball also played in representative matches. In late 1962, he kept goal for the North in the England amateur international trial match against the South; the Guardian thought he had "only a slight chance of replacing M.J. Pinner in the England goal", and his performance was not enough to take that chance. He kept a clean sheet for a Football Association Amateur XI against the Universities Athletic Union in April 1963, and playing for an FA XI against the Army, he miscued a goal kick that rebounded off the head of an opponent just outside the penalty area and "bounced gently into the top of the net".
