= 1974–75 Isthmian League =

The 1974–75 season was the 60th in the history of the Isthmian League, an English football competition.

Wycombe Wanderers won Division One, while Staines Town won Division Two.

== Division One ==
Isthmian League Division One
- Season: 1974–75
- Champions: Wycombe Wanderers
- Relegated: Bromley; Walton & Hersham
- Matches: 462
- Goals: 1,263 (2.73 per match)

Division One featured 22 clubs, including 20 clubs from the previous season and two clubs, promoted from Division Two:

- Dagenham
- Slough Town

=== League table ===
Pos	Team	Pld	W	D	L	GF	GA	GR	Pts	Relegation
1	Wycombe Wanderers	42	28	11	3	93	30	3.100	95	
2	Enfield	42	29	8	5	78	26	3.000	95	
3	Dagenham	42	28	5	9	95	44	2.159	89	
4	Tooting & Mitcham United	42	25	9	8	78	46	1.696	84	
5	Dulwich Hamlet	42	24	10	8	75	38	1.974	82	
6	Leatherhead	42	23	10	9	83	42	1.976	79	
7	Ilford	42	23	10	9	98	51	1.922	79	
8	Oxford City	42	17	9	16	63	56	1.125	60	
9	Slough Town	42	17	6	19	68	52	1.308	57	
10	Sutton United	42	17	6	19	68	63	1.079	57	
11	Bishop's Stortford	42	17	6	19	56	64	0.875	57	
12	Hitchin Town	42	15	10	17	57	71	0.803	55	
13	Hendon	42	15	7	20	59	74	0.797	52	
14	Walthamstow Avenue	42	13	9	20	56	62	0.903	48	
15	Woking	42	12	10	20	53	73	0.726	46	
16	Hayes	42	10	14	18	52	66	0.788	44	
17	Barking	42	12	8	22	57	81	0.704	44	
18	Leytonstone	42	12	7	23	42	61	0.689	43	
19	Kingstonian	42	13	4	25	48	73	0.658	43	
20	Clapton	42	12	4	26	46	96	0.479	40	
21	Walton & Hersham	42	9	4	29	37	108	0.343	31	Relegated to Division Two
22	Bromley	42	6	3	33	25	110	0.227	21	Relegated to Division Two

Source: fchd.com rsssf.com
Rules for classification: 1) points; 2) goal ratio.

=== Stadia and locations ===
Locations of the Division One clubs
Greater London Division One football clubs

Club	Stadium
Barking	Mayesbrook Park
Bishop's Stortford	Woodside Park
Bromley	Hayes Lane
Clapton	The Old Spotted Dog Ground
Dagenham	Victoria Road
Dulwich Hamlet	Champion Hill
Enfield	Southbury Road
Hayes	Church Road
Hendon	Claremont Road
Hitchin Town	Top Field
Ilford	Victoria Road
Kingstonian	Kingsmeadow
Leatherhead	Fetcham Grove
Leytonstone	Granleigh Road
Oxford City	Marsh Lane
Slough Town	Wexham Park
Sutton United	Gander Green Lane
Tooting & Mitcham United	Imperial Fields
Walthamstow Avenue	Green Pond Road
Walton & Hersham	The Sports Ground
Woking	The Laithwaite Community Stadium
Wycombe Wanderers	Adams Park

== Division Two ==
Isthmian League Division Two
- Season: 1974–75
- Champions: Staines Town
- Promoted: Southall; Staines Town
- Matches: 306
- Goals: 830 (2.71 per match)

Division Two expanded up to 18 clubs, including fourteen clubs from the previous season and four new clubs:

- Two clubs relegated from Division One:
  - Corinthian-Casuals
  - St Albans City
- Two clubs switched from the Athenian League:
  - Boreham Wood
  - Croydon

=== League table ===
Pos	Team	Pld	W	D	L	GF	GA	GR	Pts	Promotion
1	Staines Town	34	23	2	9	65	23	2.826	71	Promoted to Division One
2	Southall	34	20	3	11	55	41	1.341	63	Promoted to Division One
3	Tilbury	34	19	5	10	64	36	1.778	60 (Note: Tilbury were deducted two points.)	
4	Harwich & Parkeston	34	18	4	12	52	44	1.182	58	
5	Chesham United	34	17	6	11	59	39	1.513	57	
6	St Albans City	34	15	11	8	42	37	1.135	56	
7	Harlow Town	34	16	6	12	53	47	1.128	54	
8	Horsham	34	16	5	13	59	49	1.204	53	
9	Maidenhead United	34	13	7	14	38	40	0.950	46	
10	Hampton	34	12	7	15	44	42	1.048	43	
11	Croydon	34	11	10	13	48	55	0.873	43	
12	Hertford Town	34	10	7	17	35	52	0.673	37	
13	Boreham Wood	34	7	15	12	41	49	0.837	36	
14	Wokingham Town	34	10	6	18	32	43	0.744	36	
15	Finchley	34	9	9	16	36	53	0.679	36	
16	Carshalton Athletic	34	9	9	16	38	58	0.655	36	
17	Aveley	34	9	7	18	34	63	0.540	34	
18	Corinthian-Casuals	34	8	9	17	35	59	0.593	33	

Source: fchd.com rsssf.com
Rules for classification: 1) points; 2) goal ratio.

=== Stadia and locations ===
Locations of the Division Two clubs
Greater London Division Two football clubs

Club	Stadium
Aveley	The Mill Field
Boreham Wood	Meadow Park
Carshalton Athletic	War Memorial Sports Ground
Chesham United	The Meadow
Corinthian-Casuals	King George's Field
Croydon	Croydon Sports Arena
Finchley	Summers Lane
Hampton	Beveree Stadium
Harlow Town	Harlow Sportcentre
Harwich & Parkeston	Royal Oak
Hertford Town	Hertingfordbury Park
Horsham	Queen Street
Maidenhead United	York Road
St Albans City	Clarence Park
Southall	Robert Parker Stadium
Staines Town	Wheatsheaf Park
Tilbury	Chadfields
Wokingham Town	Cantley Park
