= 1972–73 Spartan League =

Spartan League
- Season: 1972–73

The 1972–73 Spartan League season was the 55th in the history of Spartan League. The league consisted of 18 teams.

== League table ==
Spartan League
- Season: 1972–73
- Champions: Farnborough Town
- Promoted: Feltham; Molesey
- Relegated: None

The division featured 18 teams, 16 from last season and 2 new teams:

- Farnborough Town, from Surrey Senior League
- Amersham Town, from Hellenic League Division One B

| Pos | Team | Pld | W | D | L | GF | GA | GR | Pts | Promotion or relegation |
|---|---|---|---|---|---|---|---|---|---|---|
| 1 | Farnborough Town (C) | 34 | 23 | 8 | 3 | 87 | 25 | 3.480 | 54 | |
| 2 | Hoddesdon Town | 34 | 25 | 3 | 6 | 93 | 34 | 2.735 | 53 | |
| 3 | Feltham (P) | 34 | 19 | 10 | 5 | 67 | 39 | 1.718 | 48 | Promotion to Athenian League Division Two |
| 4 | Egham Town | 34 | 19 | 8 | 7 | 78 | 40 | 1.950 | 46 | |
| 5 | Leighton Town | 34 | 18 | 8 | 8 | 69 | 35 | 1.971 | 44 | |
| 6 | Kingsbury Town | 34 | 16 | 12 | 6 | 62 | 36 | 1.722 | 44 | |
| 7 | Bracknell Town | 34 | 18 | 5 | 11 | 72 | 52 | 1.385 | 41 | |
| 8 | Molesey (P) | 34 | 15 | 10 | 9 | 49 | 34 | 1.441 | 40 | Promotion to Athenian League Division Two |
| 9 | Vauxhall Motors | 34 | 15 | 8 | 11 | 59 | 45 | 1.311 | 38 | |
| 10 | Harefield United | 34 | 13 | 6 | 15 | 43 | 49 | 0.878 | 32 | |
| 11 | Banstead Athletic | 34 | 11 | 9 | 14 | 48 | 42 | 1.143 | 31 | |
| 12 | Tring Town | 34 | 10 | 9 | 15 | 52 | 59 | 0.881 | 29 | |
| 13 | Farnham Town | 34 | 10 | 9 | 15 | 44 | 64 | 0.688 | 29 | |
| 14 | Crown and Manor | 34 | 6 | 12 | 16 | 39 | 56 | 0.696 | 24 | |
| 15 | Chalfont St. Peter | 34 | 7 | 8 | 19 | 41 | 72 | 0.569 | 22 | |
| 16 | Berkhamsted Town | 34 | 5 | 6 | 23 | 36 | 83 | 0.434 | 16 | |
| 17 | Chertsey Town | 34 | 4 | 7 | 23 | 33 | 97 | 0.340 | 15 | |
| 18 | Amersham Town | 34 | 1 | 4 | 29 | 18 | 128 | 0.141 | 6 | |

Rules for classification: 1) points; 2) goal ratio.
(C) Champions; (P) Promoted
