= 1976–77 Isthmian League =

Football competition in southern England

The 1976–77 season was the 62nd season of the Isthmian League, an English football competition.

It was the first Isthmian League season to use goal difference as a tie-breaker.

Enfield won Division One, while Tilbury won Division Two.

At the end of the season the league divisions were renamed: Division One was renamed the Premier Division and Division Two was renamed Division One. Also, seventeen new clubs were newly admitted to the league, they were placed to new Division Two, as the league expanded to three divisions.

== Division One ==
Isthmian League Division One
- Season: 1976–77
- Champions: Enfield
- Relegated: Dulwich Hamlet; Ilford
- Matches: 462
- Goals: 1,229 (2.66 per match)

Division One consisted of 22 clubs, including 20 clubs from the previous season and two clubs, promoted from Division Two:

- Croydon
- Tilbury

=== League table ===
Pos	Team	Pld	W	D	L	GF	GA	GD	Pts	Relegation
1	Enfield	42	24	12	6	63	34	+29	84	
2	Wycombe Wanderers	42	25	8	9	71	34	+37	83	
3	Dagenham	42	23	10	9	80	39	+41	79	
4	Hendon	42	19	10	13	60	48	+12	67	
5	Tilbury	42	18	13	11	57	49	+8	67	
6	Tooting & Mitcham United	42	18	10	14	85	72	+13	64	
7	Walthamstow Avenue	42	19	7	16	61	55	+6	64	
8	Slough Town	42	18	9	15	51	46	+5	63	
9	Hitchin Town	42	19	6	17	60	66	−6	63	
10	Leatherhead	42	18	7	17	61	47	+14	61	
11	Staines Town	42	16	13	13	52	48	+4	61	
12	Leytonstone	42	16	11	15	59	57	+2	59	
13	Barking	42	16	9	17	63	61	+2	57	
14	Southall & Ealing Borough	42	15	8	19	52	64	−12	53	
15	Croydon	42	13	10	19	38	52	−14	49	
16	Sutton United	42	14	7	21	40	55	−15	49	
17	Kingstonian	42	13	7	22	45	60	−15	46	
18	Hayes	42	12	10	20	49	69	−20	46	
19	Woking	42	11	12	19	47	61	−14	45	
20	Bishop's Stortford	42	11	11	20	51	71	−20	44	
21	Dulwich Hamlet	42	11	8	23	52	68	−16	41	Relegated to Division One
22	Ilford	42	10	8	24	32	73	−41	38	Relegated to Division One

Source: fchd.com rsssf.com
Rules for classification: 1) points; 2) goal difference; 3) number of goals scored.

=== Stadia and locations ===
Locations of the Division One clubs
Greater London Division One football clubs

Club	Stadium
Barking	Mayesbrook Park
Bishop's Stortford	Woodside Park
Croydon	Croydon Sports Arena
Dagenham	Victoria Road
Dulwich Hamlet	Champion Hill
Enfield	Southbury Road
Hayes	Church Road
Hendon	Claremont Road
Hitchin Town	Top Field
Ilford	Victoria Road
Kingstonian	Kingsmeadow
Leatherhead	Fetcham Grove
Leytonstone	Granleigh Road
Slough Town	Wexham Park
Southall & Ealing Borough	Robert Parker Stadium
Staines Town	Wheatsheaf Park
Sutton United	Gander Green Lane
Tilbury	Chadfields
Tooting & Mitcham United	Imperial Fields
Walthamstow Avenue	Green Pond Road
Woking	The Laithwaite Community Stadium
Wycombe Wanderers	Adams Park

== Division Two ==
Isthmian League Division Two
- Season: 1976–77
- Champions: Boreham Wood
- Promoted: Boreham Wood; Carshalton Athletic
- Matches: 462
- Goals: 1,330 (2.88 per match)

Division Two consisted of 22 clubs, including 20 clubs from the previous season and two new clubs, relegated from Division One:

- Clapton
- Oxford City

=== League table ===
Pos	Team	Pld	W	D	L	GF	GA	GD	Pts	Promotion
1	Boreham Wood	42	33	4	5	80	26	+54	103	Promoted to the Premier Division
2	Carshalton Athletic	42	25	12	5	80	33	+47	87	Promoted to the Premier Division
3	Harwich & Parkeston	42	23	8	11	93	61	+32	77	
4	Wembley	42	23	8	11	82	58	+24	77	
5	Harrow Borough	42	21	12	9	78	44	+34	75	
6	Horsham	42	23	5	14	67	56	+11	74	
7	Bromley	42	20	10	12	71	46	+25	70	
8	Oxford City	42	20	8	14	73	55	+18	68	
9	Hampton	42	20	8	14	62	45	+17	68	
10	Wokingham Town	42	16	14	12	60	44	+16	62	
11	Hornchurch	42	18	7	17	62	53	+9	61	
12	Chesham United	42	17	10	15	63	66	−3	61	
13	St Albans City	42	16	12	14	59	53	+6	60	
14	Walton & Hersham	42	17	9	16	57	56	+1	60	
15	Aveley	42	14	8	20	49	62	−13	50	
16	Corinthian-Casuals	42	13	6	23	52	75	−23	45	
17	Harlow Town	42	11	8	23	39	77	−38	41	
18	Hertford Town	42	9	9	24	45	80	−35	36	
19	Maidenhead United	42	8	8	26	36	73	−37	32	
20	Clapton	42	7	9	26	43	87	−44	30	
21	Finchley	42	5	13	24	36	82	−46	28	
22	Ware	42	5	8	29	43	98	−55	23	

Source: fchd.com rsssf.com
Rules for classification: 1) points; 2) goal difference; 3) number of goals scored.

=== Stadia and locations ===
Locations of the Division Two clubs
Greater London Division Two football clubs

Club	Stadium
Aveley	The Mill Field
Boreham Wood	Meadow Park
Bromley	Hayes Lane
Carshalton Athletic	War Memorial Sports Ground
Chesham United	The Meadow
Clapton	The Old Spotted Dog Ground
Corinthian-Casuals	King George's Field
Finchley	Summers Lane
Hampton	Beveree Stadium
Harlow Town	Harlow Sportcentre
Harrow Borough	Earlsmead Stadium
Harwich & Parkeston	Royal Oak
Hertford Town	Hertingfordbury Park
Hornchurch	Hornchurch Stadium
Horsham	Queen Street
Maidenhead United	York Road
Oxford City	Marsh Lane
St Albans City	Clarence Park
Walton & Hersham	The Sports Ground
Ware	Wodson Park
Wembley	Vale Farm
Wokingham Town	Cantley Park
