= 1973–74 Athenian League =

Athenian League
- Season: 1973–74

The 1973–74 Athenian League season was the 51st in the history of Athenian League. The league consisted of 34 teams.

== Division One ==
Athenian League Division One
- Season: 1973–74
- Champions: Boreham Wood
- Promoted: Boreham Wood; Croydon
- Relegated: None

The previous season Premier Division changed name to Division One before this season. The division featured 10 new teams:

- 8 promoted from last season's old Division One:
  - Grays Athletic (3rd)
  - Hounslow (4th)
  - Eastbourne United (7th)
  - Letchworth Town (8th)
  - Marlow (9th)
  - Edmonton (11th)
  - Herne Bay (13th)
  - Worthing (14th)
- 2 promoted from last season's old Division Two:
  - Ruislip Manor (1st)
  - Ware (3rd)

=== League table ===
Pos	Team	Pld	W	D	L	GF	GA	GR	Pts	Promotion or relegation
1	Boreham Wood (C, P)	34	25	6	3	68	20	3.400	56	Promotion to Isthmian League Division Two
2	Cheshunt	34	18	11	5	58	24	2.417	47	
3	Ruislip Manor	34	18	10	6	61	29	2.103	46	
4	Ware	34	16	8	10	55	47	1.170	40	
5	Hornchurch	34	15	9	10	48	44	1.091	39	
6	Croydon (P)	34	14	12	8	49	34	1.441	38 (Note: Croydon deducted 2 points)	Promotion to Isthmian League Division Two
7	Erith & Belvedere	34	14	9	11	41	32	1.281	37	
8	Edmonton & Haringey	34	12	12	10	40	35	1.143	36	
9	Hounslow	34	13	9	12	55	46	1.196	35	
10	Worthing	34	14	7	13	47	51	0.922	35	
11	Lewes	34	11	12	11	50	43	1.163	34	
12	Redhill	34	13	8	13	46	45	1.022	34	
13	Grays Athletic	34	8	12	14	34	40	0.850	28	
14	Wembley	34	11	6	17	42	55	0.764	28	
15	Eastbourne United	34	8	9	17	34	60	0.567	25	
16	Marlow	34	8	6	20	23	48	0.479	22	
17	Letchworth Town	34	7	7	20	28	56	0.500	21	
18	Herne Bay	34	1	7	26	16	86	0.186	9	Left to join Kent League

Source: rsssf.com
Rules for classification: 1) points; 2) goal difference; 3) number of goals scored.
(C) Champions; (P) Promoted

=== Stadia and locations ===
Locations of the Athenian League Division One clubs
Greater London Athenian League Division One football clubs

Club	Stadium
Boreham Wood	Meadow Park
Cheshunt	Cheshunt Stadium
Croydon	Croydon Sports Arena
Eastbourne United	The Oval
Erith & Belvedere	Park View
Grays Athletic	New Recreation Ground
Haringey Borough	Coles Park
Herne Bay	Winch's Field
Hornchurch	Hornchurch Stadium
Hounslow	Denbigh Road
Letchworth Garden City	Baldock Road
Lewes	The Dripping Pan
Marlow	Alfred Davis Memorial Ground
Redhill	Kiln Brow
Ruislip Manor	Grosvenor Vale
Ware	Wodson Park
Wembley	Vale Farm
Worthing	Woodside Road

== Division Two ==
Athenian League Division Two
- Season: 1973–74
- Champions: Alton Town
- Promoted: Alton Town; Rainham Town; Leyton
- Relegated: None

The previous season Division One changed name to Division Two before this season. The division featured 14 new teams:

- 10 promoted from last season's old Division Two:
  - Leyton (4th)
  - Edgware (5th)
  - Rainham Town (6th)
  - Uxbridge (7th)
  - Addlestone (8th)
  - Harrow Borough (9th)
  - Hemel Hempstead (10th)
  - Windsor & Eton (11th)
  - Eastbourne Town (12th)
  - Wingate (14th)
- 4 joined the division:
  - Alton Town, from Hampshire League
  - Faversham Town, from Metropolitan–London League
  - Molesey, from Spartan League
  - Feltham, from Spartan League

=== League table ===
Pos	Team	Pld	W	D	L	GF	GA	GR	Pts	Promotion or relegation
1	Alton Town (C, P)	30	19	7	4	54	23	2.348	45	Promotion to Division One
2	Rainham Town (P)	30	17	7	6	48	33	1.455	41	Promotion to Division One
3	Leyton (P)	30	14	11	5	55	30	1.833	39	Promotion to Division One
4	Uxbridge	30	14	11	5	36	23	1.565	39	
5	Faversham Town	30	14	7	9	47	31	1.516	35	
6	Wingate	30	15	5	10	42	37	1.135	35	
7	Molesey	30	15	5	10	36	33	1.091	35	
8	Harrow Borough	30	11	9	10	44	37	1.189	31	
9	Addlestone	30	12	5	13	41	38	1.079	29	
10	Aylesbury United	30	8	10	12	42	45	0.933	26	
11	Hemel Hempstead	30	8	9	13	37	41	0.902	25	
12	Edgware	30	9	6	15	33	54	0.611	24	
13	Eastbourne Town	30	8	7	15	31	46	0.674	23	
14	Feltham	30	7	5	18	29	50	0.580	19	
15	Dorking	30	5	7	18	38	67	0.567	17	Left the league
16	Windsor & Eton	30	6	5	19	25	50	0.500	17	

Source: rsssf.com
Rules for classification: 1) points; 2) goal difference; 3) number of goals scored.
(C) Champions; (P) Promoted

=== Stadia and locations ===
Locations of the Athenian League Division Two clubs
Greater London Athenian League Division Two football clubs

Club	Stadium
Addlestone	Liberty Lane
Alton Town	Anstey Park
Aylesbury United	Buckingham Road
Eastbourne Town	The Saffrons
Edgware	White Lion
Dorking	Meadowbank Stadium
Faversham Town	Shepherd Neame Stadium
Feltham	The Orchard
Harrow Borough	Earlsmead Stadium
Hemel Hempstead	Vauxhall Road
Leyton	Leyton Stadium
Molesey	Walton Road Stadium
Rainham Town	Deri Park
Uxbridge	Honeycroft
Windsor & Eton	Stag Meadow
Wingate	Hall Lane
