= 1968–69 Isthmian League =

The 1968–69 season was the 54th in the history of the Isthmian League, an English football competition.

Enfield were champions, winning the league for the second season in a row.

== League table ==
Isthmian League
- Season: 1968–69
- Champions: Enfield
- Matches: 380
- Goals: 1,216 (3.2 per match)

Pos	Team	Pld	W	D	L	GF	GA	GR	Pts
1	Enfield	38	27	7	4	103	28	3.679	61
2	Hitchin Town	38	23	10	5	67	41	1.634	56
3	Sutton United	38	22	9	7	83	29	2.862	53
4	Wycombe Wanderers	38	23	6	9	70	37	1.892	52
5	Wealdstone	38	20	11	7	73	48	1.521	51
6	Hendon	38	22	5	11	69	47	1.468	49
7	St Albans City	38	17	13	8	75	44	1.705	47
8	Barking	38	20	7	11	69	46	1.500	47
9	Oxford City	38	18	8	12	76	64	1.188	44
10	Tooting & Mitcham United	38	16	10	12	68	55	1.236	42
11	Leytonstone	38	18	4	16	71	53	1.340	40
12	Kingstonian	38	15	8	15	62	56	1.107	38
13	Walthamstow Avenue	38	10	10	18	47	71	0.662	30
14	Maidstone United	38	10	8	20	47	75	0.627	28
15	Clapton	38	10	7	21	52	76	0.684	27
16	Woking	38	8	7	23	45	77	0.584	23
17	Bromley	38	8	7	23	52	95	0.547	23
18	Dulwich Hamlet	38	6	9	23	31	77	0.403	21
19	Ilford	38	6	8	24	33	77	0.429	20
20	Corinthian-Casuals	38	2	4	32	23	120	0.192	8

Source: fchd.com rsssf.com
Rules for classification: 1) points; 2) goal ratio.

=== Stadia and locations ===
Locations of the Isthmian League clubs
Greater London Isthmian League football clubs

Club	Stadium
Barking	Mayesbrook Park
Bromley	Hayes Lane
Clapton	The Old Spotted Dog Ground
Corinthian-Casuals	King George's Field
Dulwich Hamlet	Champion Hill
Enfield	Southbury Road
Hendon	Claremont Road
Hitchin Town	Top Field
Ilford	Victoria Road
Kingstonian	Kingsmeadow
Leytonstone	Granleigh Road
Maidstone United	Gallagher Stadium
Oxford City	Marsh Lane
St Albans City	Clarence Park
Sutton United	Gander Green Lane
Tooting & Mitcham United	Imperial Fields
Walthamstow Avenue	Green Pond Road
Wealdstone	Grosvenor Vale
Woking	The Laithwaite Community Stadium
Wycombe Wanderers	Adams Park
