= Tony Moor =

English footballer and cricketer (born 1940)

Personal information
- Full name: Anthony John Moor
- Date of birth: 18 January 1940
- Place of birth: Scarborough, England
- Position: Goalkeeper

Senior career*
Years	Team	Apps	(Gls)
–	Scarborough		
1962–1965	York City	57	(0)
1965–1972	Darlington	239	(0)
- * Club domestic league appearances and goals

Anthony John Moor (born 18 January 1940) is an English former footballer who made 296 appearances playing as a goalkeeper in the Football League for York City and Darlington in the 1960s and 1970s. Before joining York City, he played non-league football for Scarborough. He was ever-present as Darlington were promoted to the Third Division in 1965–66 as Fourth Division runners-up.

Moor played for Scarborough Cricket Club for many years, captaining them to the Yorkshire League title three times in the 1970s and to the National Club Knockout Competition in 1976 and 1979. He played for the National Cricket Association XI against the touring Canadian team in 1974, and for the Yorkshire League XI against the West Indies tourists in 1973 and the Pakistanis in 1974.
