= Hitchin Town F.C. =

Association football club in England

Coordinates: 51°57′16″N 0°17′3″W

Hitchin Town
- Full name: Hitchin Town Football Club
- Nickname: The Canaries
- Founded: 1928
- Ground: Top Field, Hitchin, Hertfordshire
- Capacity: 3,529
- Chairman: Paul Sprague
- Manager: Michael Jones
- League: Southern League Premier Division Central
- 2025–26: Southern League Division One Central, 2nd of 22 (promoted via play-offs)
- Website: hitchintownfc.club
| Home colours | Away colours |

Hitchin Town Football Club is an English semi-professional football club based in Hitchin, Hertfordshire. They are currently members of the Southern League Premier Division Central. Founded in 1865 and known as 'The Canaries', Hitchin Town have been based at Top Field since their foundation, and claim lineage from the defunct Hitchin Football Club, formed in 1865 and liquidated in 1911.

The club have played in a number of local leagues, starting off in the Spartan League before moving to first the Athenian League in 1939, then the Isthmian League in 1963 and finally the Southern League in 2004. Their most recent league honour has been the Southern League Division One Central, finishing play-off winners in 2010–11, their second season in the competition.

== History ==
The original Hitchin club, Hitchin F.C., were formed in 1865. The club took part in the inaugural FA Cup competition in 1871–72, reaching the quarter-finals before losing to runners-up Royal Engineers. In 1905, Hitchin defeated Chelsea 3–2 to become the first away team to win at Stamford Bridge. Hitchin turned professional during the early years of the 20th century, but following financial difficulties and a fire at their ground, the club folded in 1911.

Hitchin Town F.C. were formed in 1928, and it was at this time also that the "Canaries" identity was settled upon. The club colours were agreed as yellow and blue, replacing the old club's white and magenta – green replaced blue after only a few seasons. The new club were admitted to the Spartan League, and their first season, 1928–29, was a success – Hitchin won the Herts Charity Shield, as well as promotion to the Spartan League's second tier. Promotion to the top flight of the Spartan League was won in 1930–31 and Hitchin won the AFA Senior Cup a year later. Reg Smith, a future England player, led Hitchin to the Spartan League championship in 1934–35 before moving on to Millwall a year later. The club moved from the Spartan League to the Athenian League for the 1939–40 season, but after only two league matches the outbreak of World War II prompted the suspension of competitive football.

The Athenian League returned for 1945–46, and Hitchin finished 10th out of 14 clubs. The next season saw an improvement to sixth, but Hitchin did not achieve a finish higher than mid-table until the 1953–54 campaign – Hitchin finished as runners-up. The club reached the quarter-finals of the FA Amateur Cup, but lost 10–1 to Crook Town. Two years later, Hitchin beat Wycombe Wanderers 1–0 in the same competition in front of 7,878 spectators, but the club once again failed to progress beyond the quarter-finals. Peter Hammond became the first Hitchin player to represent his country in 1958, when he appeared for England's amateur team. Former Arsenal player and England international Laurie Scott was appointed manager the same year.

Scott worked to bring the amateur club more into line with their professional counterparts. The club met Football League opposition in the FA Cup for the first time during 1958–59, but despite holding Millwall to a 1–1 draw at Top Field, lost 2–1 in the replay. Hitchin travelled to Crystal Palace two years later in the same competition and lost 6–2. Meanwhile, Scott prepared his team for an assault on the Athenian League title and the FA Amateur Cup. Scott's team finished fifth during 1960–61, and lost in the semi-finals of the Cup. Hitchin came sixth the next year, and 1962–63 saw another fifth-place finish and semi-final defeat before the club switched league again – joining the Isthmian League.

The move to the Isthmian League coincided with a time of financial strife at the club. The club finished in the bottom half of the division during their first five seasons in the league, as the club struggled to attract players of a sufficient quality. The club were not helped by corruption behind the scenes – some supposedly amateur players were receiving salaries, and when this emerged, the club were barracked by the local press. It took some time for the clouds to disperse, and the result was the departure of Scott. The late 1960s saw the arrival of Vince Burgess as manager. Led by Burgess, Hitchin finished as Isthmian League runners-up in 1968–69 and won the London Senior Cup a year later. The success brought by Burgess then dissipated as soon as it had appeared, as Burgess left the club in 1970. Hitchin did, however, win the East Anglian Cup in 1972–73.

During the 1970s, Hitchin reached the FA Cup first round four times —– in 1973–74, 1974–75, 1976–77 and 1978–79. The 1973–74 run was ended abruptly by fellow non-League side Boston United, who beat Hitchin 1–0 in the second round to deny them a third-round tie against Derby County. Meanwhile, league finishes were poor – Hitchin only finished in the top half twice, ninth in 1976–77 and fifth a year later.

A sixth-place finish in 1983–84 proved to be a last hurrah – Hitchin Town suffered relegation from the Isthmian League Premier Division in 1987–88. It took five years for Hitchin to return, and the club suffered major financial hardship. Andy Melvin, who both owned and managed the club, led Hitchin back to the Premier Division in 1992–93 by winning the First Division. In the club's first season back, Melvin took them to eighth place and then fifth a year later.

In 1994–95, the club beat Hereford United 4–2 at Top Field in the FA Cup first round. A year later, Bristol Rovers were defeated 2–1, also in the first round, thanks to two early goals. The second round tie at Gillingham, was lost 3–0. Despite the cup success, league form plummeted once more. The club were relegated once again in 1997–98, but the club won promotion back a year later. Melvin led the club to a 10th-place finish in 2000–01, before stepping down.

The club's new boss was Robbie O'Keefe, who had presided over the club's youth academy. He left after two uneventful mid-table seasons, and was replaced by former Chelsea, Luton Town and England forward Kerry Dixon. With Dixon at the helm, the club finished fourth from bottom, and the club left the Isthmian League at the end of the season. Hitchin Town moved to the Southern League.

Halfway through the following season, Dixon was replaced by former Luton Town defender Darren Salton. A supporters trust was formed in 2005 to contribute weekly to the club's playing budget, and this helped the management to balance the books. Salton brought some success to the club in the form of a Southern League Cup victory in 2005–06. The 2006–07 campaign was an anti-climax – Hitchin were second in the league in December, but a spectacular collapse saw them 11th at season's end.

Hitchin were at the foot of the table from the off during 2007–08, and Salton was replaced by Darran Hay in November. Hay managed to guide the club to safety, as Hitchin finished 18th, but resigned in January 2009 with the club battling relegation once more. Colin Payne was appointed manager a month later, but he was unable to prevent relegation from the Southern League Premier Division. In 2009–10, Hitchin led the Midlands Division for long periods, but eventually finished runners-up to Bury Town, despite reaching 100 points in a campaign that saw them win 31 of their 42 league games. Hitchin played Slough in the semi-final play-off, but lost 1–2 at home, consigning them to another season at that level. A few days later, Colin Payne resigned as manager and Carl Williams was appointed manager of the club. Williams experienced extraordinary success in his first season in charge. Hitchin led the league table for most of the campaign before a mid-season drop in form eroded their advantage at the top. On the final day of the season, they were beaten by near-neighbours Arlesey Town, who won the league title. Hitchin had to negotiate the play-offs for the second successive season, but won promotion by beating Slough and Daventry. It was a successful and momentous season for the club, with the biggest average attendances since 1994–95 and the most goals scored in a league campaign (107) since 1928–29. Furthermore, for the second consecutive year, the club had the top scorer in its division – John Frendo's 31 goals topping the list of marksmen.

Frendo's goals were again instrumental in Hitchin's first season back in the Southern League Premier Division in 2011–12. In a campaign that had its highs, notably in the form of victories against AFC Totton, Cambridge City and eventual champions Brackley, Hitchin eventually finished 14th. Similarly, Frendo's 44 goals in 48 appearances during the 2012-13 campaign not only helped Hitchin to a 13th-place finish in the league but won him the award of Non-League's top scorer, beating Altrincham's Damian Reeves by 1 goal. His hat-trick on the last day of the season away to Bedford meant Frendo had scored over 100 goals for Hitchin in 3 seasons.

At the end of that season, manager Carl Williams stepped down. Former player Mark Burke was appointed manager in the summer of 2013 and the previous side almost entirely moved on. Despite this Burke and his assistant Adam Parker recruited some new young talent and finished in a creditable 13th position.

Hitchin Town made steady progress in the Southern League Premier Division in the next five seasons. They finished 14th, 13th, 13th and 9th, before reaching a best-ever position in the league of 3rd in 2015–16. This saw them qualify for the play-offs but they lost their semi-final at Top Field 3–2 to Hungerford Town, having held a 2–0 lead in front of a crowd of 1305. However the season ended on a high as Hitchin then defeated Boreham Wood 2–1 to lift the Hertfordshire Senior Cup. In 2016–17, Hitchin Town finished in 4th place and won their play-off semi-final via a penalty shoot-out against Merthyr Town. The final took place at Leamington and Hitchin took an early lead which they held until the 90th minute when they conceded a penalty and were reduced to ten men. Leamington won 2–1 with a goal in extra time to clinch promotion. Hitchin did however retain the Hertfordshire Senior Cup with a 2–1 win over Bishops Stortford, having previously lost 1–0 to Cheshunt in the Hertfordshire Charity Cup Final.

== Seasons ==
This is the five most recent Hitchin Town seasons for a full history see List of Hitchin Town F.C. seasons.

| Year | League | Lvl | Pld | W | D | L | GF | GA | GD | Pts | Position | Leading league scorer | | FA Cup | | FA Trophy | | Average home attendance |
| Year | League | Lvl | Pld | W | D | L | GF | GA | GD | Pts | Position | Name | Goals | Res | Rec | Res | Rec | Average home attendance |
|---|---|---|---|---|---|---|---|---|---|---|---|---|---|---|---|---|---|---|
| 2020–21 | Southern League Premier Division | 3 | 7 | 3 | 1 | 3 | 12 | 14 | −2 | 10 | 10th of 22* | Callum Stead | 6 | QR2 | 1–0–1 | 2 | 2–0–1 | 427 |
| 2021–22 | Southern League Premier Division | 3 | 40 | 11 | 9 | 20 | 47 | 58 | -11 | 42 | 16th of 21 | Callum Stead | 13 | QR2 | 1–0–1 | QR3 | 0–0–1 | 493 |
| 2022–23 | Southern League Premier Division | 3 | 42 | 16 | 11 | 15 | 52 | 60 | -8 | 59 | 12th of 22 | Diogo Freitas-Gouveia | 11 | QR1 | 0–0–1 | QR3 | 0–0–1 | 500 |
| 2023–24 | Southern League Premier Division | 3 | 42 | 11 | 6 | 23 | 46 | 64 | -18 | 39 | 19th of 22; Relegated,then Reprieved | Finley Wilkinson | 13 | QR3 | 2–2–1 | QR3 | 0–0–1 | 605 |
| 2024–25 | Southern League Premier Division | 3 | 42 | 8 | 10 | 24 | 54 | 84 | -30 | 34 | 21st of 22; Relegated | Rio Deall; Daniel Stokoe | 8 | QR1 | 0–0–1 | QR3 | 0–0–1 | 610 |
| 2025-26 | Southern Football League Division One Central | 4 | 42 | 28 | 8 | 6 | 101 | 37 | +64 | 92 | 2nd of 22 Went to Promotion Playoffs, Won both games to be promoted. | | | QR2 | 2-0-1 | QR3 | 0-0-1 | TBC |

== Stadium ==
Hitchin Town have played home matches at Top Field on Fishponds Road since their foundation in 1928. Prior to that, the original Hitchin club played here from 1873 until their liquidation in 1911, although it was often referred to as the Bedford Road Sports Ground, it's the same stadium. They also played at Ransoms Field and Dog Kennel Farm in nearby Charlton. A public house opposite the ground doubled as a changing room for the players, and a wooden grandstand was constructed during the late 19th century. However, this stand burnt down in 1911, just before the original club's liquidation.

Football continued to be played on the site during the period after this, with Hitchin St. Saviours, Hitchin Union Jack, Hitchin Wednesday and the Boys' Club all using the ground for minor matches.

Senior football returned to the ground in 1928, with the foundation of Hitchin Town. Floodlights were installed in 1962, and inaugurated by a friendly match against Arsenal. A new clubhouse was built a year later, which on construction was considered one of the finest in amateur football. A sauna was added in the late 1960s.

New floodlights were installed in Summer 2016 and, as some 50 years earlier, they were officially inaugurated with a friendly match against an Arsenal side on 10 November 2016. The lights were switched on by former Arsenal player Pat Rice.

The record attendance at Top Field, 7,878, was set on 18 February 1956 for an FA Amateur Cup tie between Hitchin Town and Wycombe Wanderers. The ground's current capacity is 3,529.

The ground retained its wooden terracing around half the ground up until 2021. With requirements to remove all of the uncovered wooden terracing to comply with FA Ground Grading at the level Hitchin Town were playing, and then the whole of the Fishponds Road stand collapsing during a storm during 2021, in the middle of the pandemic, a plan was put together to replace the whole of the Fishponds Road end with a new stand and remove all of the uncovered wooden terracing. This was achieved ready for the start of the 2021–22 season. Now the only wooden terracing still in existence is the covered section behind the dugouts. Although these necessary changes were made, the club retains its original and traditional Top Field character.

A brand new Club Shop was introduced in the ground which is the envy of many clubs, and food and drinks are provided by Canary Kitchen on the Car Park side of the ground. The Club House is outside of the ground, but entry to and from the ground is controlled and there is also a drinks concession in the ground.

In the 2020 book British Football's Greatest Grounds, Top Field was voted the fifth best stadium in Britain.

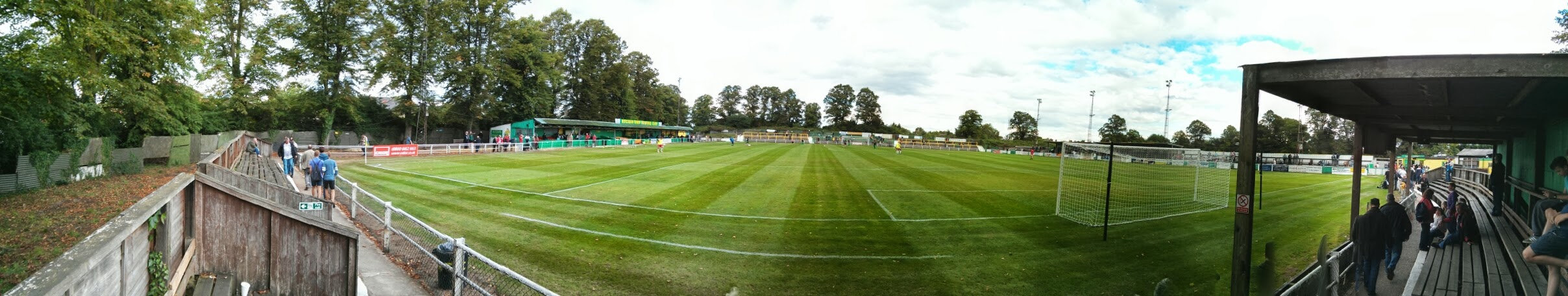
A panorama of Top Field

=== The Cow Commoners ===
In 1880, the land upon which Top Field resides was entrusted as common land – protected since Elizabethan times for the grazing of animals – to a body of townsmen who held a special interest or knowledge of Hitchin (through residence, occupation, employment or otherwise) in order to determine suitable use for the land due to reduction in the need for public grazing space. This group was formalised as the Cow Commoners' Trust (CCT), an unelected body linked to several prominent families in Hitchin, who decided the land should be reserved for charitable and/or charitable sporting use.

Since the clubs reformation in 1928 to 1977, the club maintained friendly relations with the CCT, having an annually renewable lease on the land and being able to construct permanent concrete terracing and club facilities. A 21-year lease until 1999 was subsequently granted on the basis of sufficient guarantees of financial support to the club.

However, in the 1990s, the attitude of the CCT shifted to one opposing permanent development on Butts Close common and opposing permanent structures on Top Field. Further, the CCT began to oppose a commercial entity – the football club – using the land due to its commitment to maintain the land for charitable activities. This, combined with the impending expiry of the lease, put the CCT in direct conflict with the football club and its supporters who wished to renovate increasingly dilapidated structures at the ground and if possible expand and seek council funding in a similar manner to local rivals Stevenage Borough FC. The ensuing legal conflict has resulted in the club being neither able to construct permanent new facilities at the ground, nor remove and renovate extensively existing structures – it also left the club in constant existential threat due to the retention of the lease by the CCT, which expired in 2013.

In February 2011, a local solicitor acting as a 'friend of the club' and on behalf of Dunmore Developments Ltd, a local property development company, made an application to de-register the land as common land under the Commons Registration Act 2006 on the basis that the land was never subject to the right of common – and thus was never common land to be left to the CCT in the first place. Following a public enquiry, in January 2012, Top Field was de-registered as common land, whilst however reaffirming the ownership of the land by the CCT.

Amid fears that Top Field was to be sold to a major supermarket, a "Save Top Field" campaign was launched by local residents. The campaign and the club came together during the 2014–15 season when it became public knowledge that a developer in conjunction with the Cow Commoners Trust were seeking to build a new supermarket on the Top Field site and to relocate the Football Club to an out of town site on greenbelt land.

The football club and the community responded to this threat with a campaign involving a public meeting, a petition and fundraising. This culminated, on 6 December 2014, with a march through Hitchin of some 1,300 people in protest at the plans followed by a crowd of 1,606 for the match against Poole Town. The campaigning attracted considerable media interest.

In February 2015, the break clause in the lease on Top Field passed, meaning that the football club now had a lease for a further 25 years. This was set against a background of celebrating the 150th anniversary of association football in Hitchin. Throughout 2015, events to mark that occasion took place, including a prestigious match against Premiership Norwich City F.C. on 14 July, where Norwich ran out 10–0 winners.

== Supporters ==
In the 2011–12 season Hitchin's average attendance was 388, making them the fifth best supported club in the Southern League Premier Division. This was a record for the club in the Southern League Premier. In the 2013–14 season, the average was still 342 (equal seventh best), despite a number of Saturday prestige games being postponed and rescheduled to midweek evenings. In 2014-15 the average increased to 391 as community initiatives (such as Forces and Ladies' Days) and the success of Monday evenings for midweek games contributed strongly. This increased again in 2015–16 as a result of further community initiatives and finishing the season in the play-off places; the average gate was 423. In 2016–17, the average rose further to 478, followed by 430 in 2017–18, including an impressive 755 for the Non-League Day fixture versus Stratford Town F.C.

It was in 2018 that Hitchin Town started to sell tickets online for their fixtures. Whilst there was some resistance to this at the start, it proved massively helpful in organising a FA Cup First Round tie against Solihull Moors in November of that year, with around 2700 of the 3148 attendance buying their tickets online. Fast forward to the pandemic, attendance restrictions of 600 and the need to "track and trace" all attendees at games, and ticketing online became a necessity, with a 600 limit placed on maximum capacity for the League games that did take place. But post-Covid and online ticketing saw a marked change in the demographic profile of Hitchin Town supporters, with more families and younger people starting to attend matches. The club saw an increase in attendances in spite of the online ticketing policy and games being all ticket.

In 2024, by which time the club was back on an even footing and with enough volunteers for match days, it introduced a small match day ticket office window with a view to helping those who had previously had greater challenges with acquiring online tickets. Payment is card only and no cash is accepted at this ticket office, but attendances have continued to thrive and at the present time this season (March 2026) the average attendance for League games stands at 727, out of which almost 90% of attendees have bought their tickets online in advance.

== Community ==
Hitchin Town F.C. operates a range of community engagement initiatives, including a matchday mascot programme for local grassroots football clubs, schools and youth organisations. Participants are given a behind-the-scenes tour of Top Field, meet the players, walk onto the pitch before kick-off and take part in activities on the pitch at half-time. Clubs and organisations that have participated include Hitchin Town Youth FC, Hitchin Belles, FC Comets, Letchworth Eagles, local schools and Cub groups.

== Statistics and records ==
Hitchin Town's best ever league finish was second-place in the Isthmian League (then at level 5 of the overall English football league system) in 1968–69, the sixth in a spell of 10 seasons played at that level. Hitchin have reached the second round of the FA Cup four times, in 1973–74, 1976–77, 1994–95 and 1995–96. The record for highest attendance was set in 1955–56, when an FA Amateur Cup tie against Wycombe Wanderers attracted 7,878 spectators.

=== Cup records ===
==== Hitchin FC ====
- Best FA Cup performance: Second round, 1871–72

==== Hitchin Town FC ====
- Best FA Cup performance: Second round, 1973–74, 1976–77, 1994–95, 1995–96
- Best FA Trophy performance: Fifth round, 1998–99
- Best FA Amateur Cup performance: Semi-finals, 1960–61, 1962–63

=== Former players ===
See Category:Hitchin Town F.C. players for all past and present players with biographies.

=== Management committee ===
- Andy Melvin (managing director)
- Paul Sprague (Club Chairman)
- Terry Barratt (Club President)
- Roy Izzard (Club Secretary)
- Mick Docking (Commercial)
- Mark Burke (Company Secretary and Community)
- David Tudball (Supporters Trust)

=== Administration and media ===
- Chris Newbold (Fixtures Secretary and Ticketing)
- Hannah Jones (Club Safety Officer)
- Kate Deller (Volunteer Co-Ordinator)
- Peter Else (Club Photographer)
- Stewart Curtis (Website)
- Marac Alionic (radio broadcasting, in conjunction with HTFC Radio)
- Freddie Cardy (radio broadcasting, in conjunction with HTFC Radio)
- Paul Sprague (social media)

=== Football management ===
- Manager: Michael Jones
- Assistant Manager: Stephen Gleeson
- Goalkeeper Coach: John Albon
- Coach: Kieron Forbes
- Coach: Josh Bickerstaff
- Physiotherapist: Chloe Ping
- Kit man: Nick Sopowski
- Kit man: Derek Barker

== Current squad ==
As of 11 March 2026

Note: Flags indicate national team as defined under FIFA eligibility rules; some limited exceptions apply. Players may hold more than one non-FIFA nationality.

| Pos. | Nation | Player |
|---|---|---|
| GK | ENG | Tyler McGregor (captain) |
| GK | ENG | Josh Mollison |
| GK | ENG | Josh Bowler |
| DF | ENG | Josh Jackman |
| MF | ENG | Will McNeill |
| DF | ENG | Callum Kane |
| DF | ENG | Charlie Briggs |
| DF | ENG | Brett Longden |
| DF | ENG | Blue Joy |
| DF | ENG | Ciaren Jones (captain) |
| DF | ENG | Toby Syme |
| MF | ENG | Kye Tearle |
| MF | ENG | Kieron Forbes |

| Pos. | Nation | Player |
|---|---|---|
| MF | IRL | Stephen Gleeson |
| MF | ENG | Josh Coldicott-Stevens |
| MF | ENG | Kavan Cotter |
| MF | ENG | Elliott Phillips |
| MF | ENG | Fernando Bell-Toxtle |
| MF | ENG | George Morrall |
| MF | ENG | Liam Brooks |
| MF | ENG | Callum Nicolson |
| MF | ENG | Cole Butler |
| MF | ENG | Lewis Franklin |
| FW | ENG | Diogo Freitas-Gouveia |
| FW | ENG | Taylor Rhiney |

The Southern Football League does not use a squad numbering system.

== Honours ==
- Isthmian League
  - Division One champions 1992–93
- Spartan League
  - Champions 1934–35
- AFA Senior Cup
  - Winners 1931–32
- Southern League
  - League Cup winners 2005–06, 2017–18
- London Senior Cup
  - Winners 1969–70
  - Runners up 1972–73
- East Anglian Cup
  - Winners 1972–73
- Herts Senior Cup
  - Winners (14) 1930–31, 1931–32, 1933–34, 1937–38, 1938–39, 1940–41, 1942–43, 1961–62, 1969–70, 1974–75, 1976–77, 1996–97, 2015–16, 2016–17
