= Harlow Town F.C. =

Association football club in England

Coordinates: 51°46′15″N 0°4′4″E

Harlow Town
- Full name: Harlow Town Football Club
- Nickname: The Hawks
- Founded: 1879; 147 years ago
- Ground: The Harlow Arena, Harlow
- Capacity: 3,500 (350 seated)
- Owner(s): Melody Media and PSM Pension Scheme
- Manager: Vacant
- League: Spartan South Midlands League Premier Division
- 2025–26: Spartan South Midlands League Premier Division, 16th of 20
Home colours	Away colours

Harlow Town Football Club is an English football club based in Harlow, Essex. The club is a member of the Spartan South Midlands League Premier Division and plays at The Harlow Arena.

The club is best known for the 1979–80 FA Cup, in which it reached the fourth round, eliminating two Football League sides Southend United and Leicester City before losing to Watford at Vicarage Road.

== History ==
The club was originally formed in 1879, playing its first match on 18 October 1879 against Saffron Walden. In those early days the club, just known as Harlow, played friendly matches against local opposition until the formation of East Herts League in 1896. In 1898, the club merged with Netteswell and Burnt Mill and was briefly renamed Harlow and Burnt Mill F.C., but the merger was reversed in 1902.

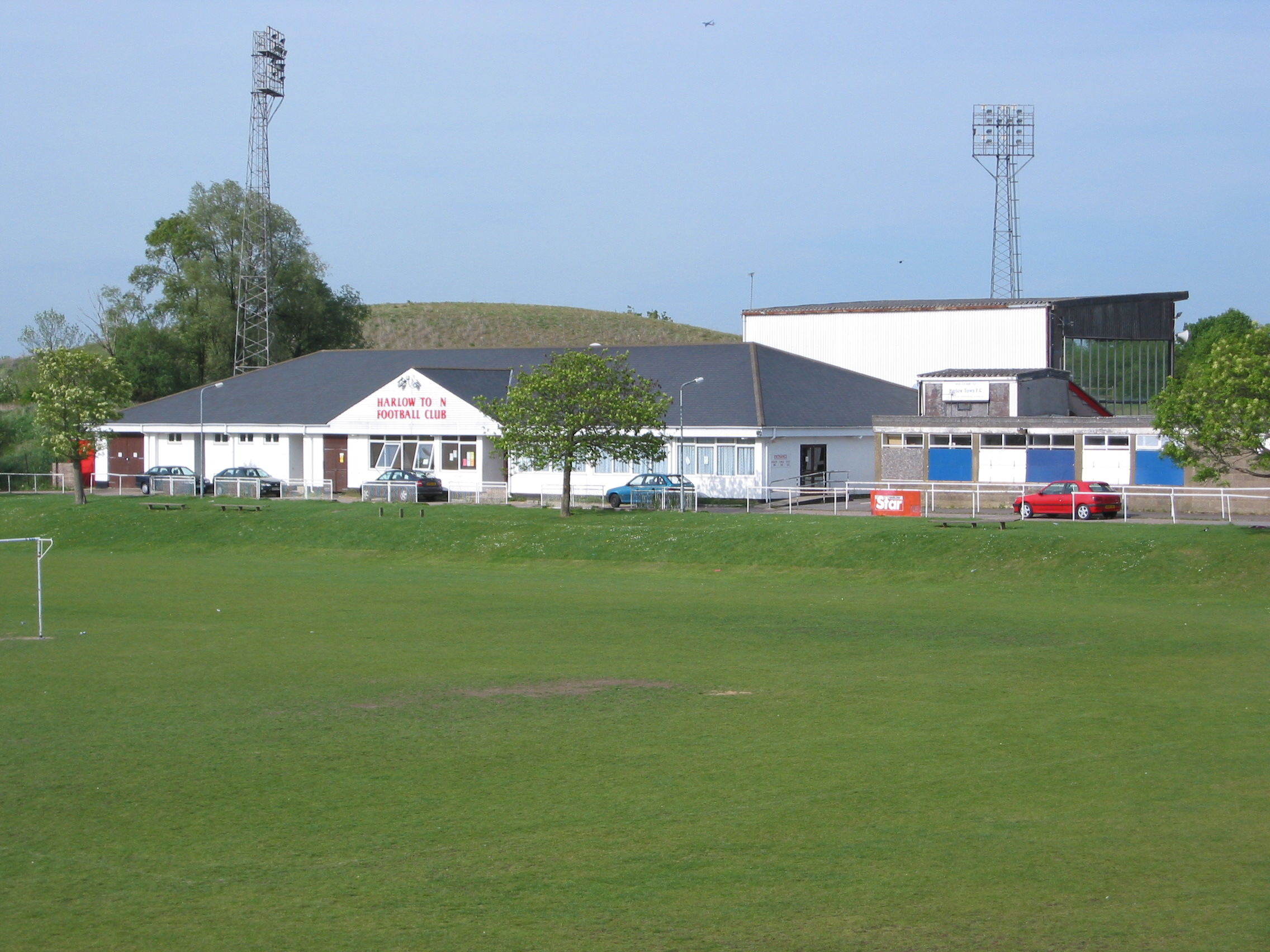
The Sportcentre, Harlow Town's home from 1960 to 2006

The club moved into the Spartan League in 1932 and was granted Senior Status in 1937, competing in the FA Cup and Essex Senior Cups for the first time. At this time Harlow had one of the smallest populations for clubs competing at this level, a far cry from today where the population is around 86,000.

Over the years Harlow, which became a New Town in the early 1950s, expanded beyond recognition, and the football club grew with the town. In 1954, the club joined the Premier Division of the London League. In 1960, they won the League Cup and moved to the newly built Sportcentre on Hammarskjold Road. In 1961 they switched to the Delphian League. In 1963, it merged into the Athenian League, and the club was placed in Division Two. After finishing third in 1963–64, they were promoted to Division One. Due to Harlow's facilities at the Sportcentre, the club attracted well-known teams to the area during this period. In July 1966, Harlow Town arranged a friendly match against Uruguay, who were staying nearby in preparation for that summer's FIFA World Cup. Uruguay defeated Harlow 6–1. In 1968, S.L. Benfica reached the European Cup final against Manchester United at Wembley Stadium, and prepared for the final at the Sportcentre; their team included the 1966 World Cup Golden Boot winner Eusébio.

In 1971–72, the club won Division One and was promoted to the Premier Division of the Athenian League. In 1973, the club switched to Division Two of the Isthmian League, renamed Division One in 1977. In 1978–79, they won Division One and were promoted to the Premier Division.

The 1979–80 season saw the club make its best-ever run in the FA Cup. They entered at the preliminary round, beating Lowestoft Town, Hornchurch, Bury Town, Harwich & Parkeston and Margate to reach the first round proper for the first time, where they defeated Leytonstone/Ilford 2–1. In the second round, they drew 1–1 away at Football League side Southend United before winning the replay at the Sportcentre 1–0 in front of 5,000 spectators. The club were then drawn away to Second Division leaders Leicester City. After a 1–1 draw at Filbert Street, Harlow famously won the replay at the Sportcentre 1–0, watched by a club-record attendance of 9,723. In the fourth round Harlow were drawn away to Watford, losing 4–3.

In the 1981–82 season, the club was relegated but returned to the Premier Division after a single season in Division One. However, two consecutive relegations in 1984–85 and 1985–86 saw the club drop into Division Two North. In 1988–89, they won the division and returned to Division One.

The club's plans to leave the Sportcentre for a new stadium on Roydon Road collapsed during the 1991–92 season, and the Isthmian League closed the Sportcentre after it no longer met league requirements. The team fulfilled the remainder of their home games at local venues including Sawbridgeworth, Bishop's Stortford, Ware and Aveley. The club dropped out of football for the 1992–93 season.

Upon being voted back into the Isthmian League for the 1993–94 season after upgrading the Sportcentre, the club were forced to drop into Division Three. In 1997–98, they were promoted to Division Two, and the following season were promoted to Division One. In 2004 the club was transferred to Division One East of the Southern League, but returned to the Isthmian League in 2006.

In October 2006, the club moved to its new ground at Barrow's Farm. After finishing as runners-up in Division One North in 2006–07 they won the promotion play-offs and were promoted to the Premier Division after defeating A.F.C. Sudbury in the final. However, they were relegated back to Division One North at the end of the 2008–09 season.

In January 2010, new owners took control of the club, with former manager Tommy Cunningham returning to the club alongside business partner John Barnett. The 2010–11 season saw Kevin Warren become the Hawks manager, but a run of defeats led to Danny Chapman replacing him at the helm. Chapman then turned the tide and took the club to the Division One North play-offs after finishing fourth, but failed to reach the final after being defeated by Wingate & Finchley.

At the start of the 2014–15 season, Harlow Town launched The Harlow Academy, a youth set-up that incorporated 21 youth teams playing at The Harlow Arena. After a tightly contested league campaign, Harlow missed out on the league title and automatic promotion by one point, finishing behind Needham Market. Another play-off campaign beckoned, but Harlow lost 4–3 to Thurrock in the semi-finals after extra-time.

The 2015–16 season saw Harlow Town go on a club record streak of 12 consecutive wins between 19 December 2015 and 13 February 2016, propelling themselves into the play-offs, finishing the season in third place, and setting up a third consecutive appearance in the play-offs. The Hawks hosted A.F.C. Hornchurch in the final at the Harlow Arena, where 1,655 spectators saw Harlow claim promotion to the Premier Division with a 3–1 win.

In the 2016–17 season, Harlow achieved a new club record highest league finish of tenth in the Isthmian Premier Division, their first campaign at that level since 2009. The 2017–18 season was a fierce relegation battle in the Isthmian Premier division, with Harlow Town eventually finishing one place above the relegation zone.

The Club once again fought against relegation throughout the 2018–19 season, however, the challenge proved too great and Harlow Town finished bottom of the league table, seven points from safety. With the Hawks heading back to Step 4, they were allocated to the Isthmian League South Central division. Despite starting the season strongly and leading the league table at one stage, a run of poor results leading up to Christmas saw Harlow Town fall off the pace. As a result, Danny Chapman resigned as manager in January 2020, after nine years in the role, to be replaced by Mark Holloway.

The start to the 2020 season was one of turmoil, with the COVID-19 pandemic causing disruption to the campaign preparations. Dave Collis replaced Mark Holloway as Manager in October, and Collis himself was relieved of his managerial duties in December after a run of nine consecutive defeats, to be replaced by former Manager Danny Chapman who stepped back into the role after some time away from the game.

In December 2022, Harlow Town withdrew from the Southern Football League, as problems with their artificial pitch left them unable to fulfill their fixtures. In May 2023, the club announced that the problems had been resolved and that they had negotiated a return to the league pyramid for the 2023–24 season, being placed in the Eastern Counties League Division One South.

Harlow Town entered administration on 9 January 2026. The club was deducted ten points for going into administration. They were no longer in administration by 20 April 2026 when the club was purchased by Melody Media and PSM Pension Scheme.

== Club officials ==
Role	Name
Chairman	
Managers	Franco Zabotti
Club Secretary	Ray Dyer
President	Ron Bruce

== Managerial history ==
Years	Manager
1957–1958	Rick Barrett (Note: Harlow Town did not have their first manager until 1957, as they had a Selection Committee for the first 77 years of their history.)
1958–1959	Dennis Bow
1959–1964	Jack Kavanagh
1964–1966	Ralph Wetton
1966–1967	Ken Driver
1967–1969	Bryan Atkinson
1969–1971	Brian Somers
1971–1973	Roy Thomas
1973–1974	Jack Price
1974–1975	Gordon Sedgley
1975–1976	Len Gamblin
1976–1982	Ian Wolstenholme
1982–1985	Gwyn Walters
1985–1994	Dave Edwards (Note: Edwards lost his job as manager in 1992 after the club went into administration, but was instantly re-instated in 1993 when the club returned to the Isthmian League.)
1994–1995	Len Glover
1995–1997	Dave Greene
1997–1999	Eddie McCluskey
1999–2002	Ian Allinson
2002–2003	John Kendall
2003–2006	Tommy Cunningham
2006–2008	Ryan Kirby
2008–2009	Glen Alzapiedi
2009	Ant Anstead
2009–2010	Marvin Samuel
2010–2011	Kevin Warren
2011–2020	Danny Chapman
2020	Mark Holloway
2020	Dave Collis
2020–2026	Danny Chapman
2026	Syrus Gordon (interim)
2026	John Mackie and Jason Geraghty

== Ten-year history ==
Season	Division	Step	Position	FA Cup	FA Trophy/FA Vase	League Cup
2016–17	Isthmian Premier Division	3	10th	2nd qualifying round	Second round	First round
2017–18	Isthmian Premier Division	3	21st	3rd qualifying round	3rd qualifying round	First round
2018–19	Isthmian Premier Division	3	22nd (relegated)	1st qualifying round	2nd qualifying round	First round
2019–20	Isthmian Division One South Central	4	14th (Note: Competition declared null and void, due to the COVID-19 pandemic)	Preliminary round	Extra preliminary round	Group stage
2020–21	Isthmian Division One South Central	4	20th	1st qualifying round	2nd qualifying round	Not held
2021–22	Southern League Division One Central	4	7th	Preliminary round	3rd qualifying round	Third round
2022–23	Southern League Division One Central	4	Withdrew (demoted)	1st qualifying round	First Round	Withdrew
2023–24	Eastern Counties Division One South	6	3rd	Did not enter	2nd qualifying round	Winners
2024–25	Eastern Counties Division One South	6	1st (promoted)	Did not enter	2nd qualifying round	Runners-up
2025–26	Spartan South Midlands Premier Division	5	16th	Preliminary Round	2nd qualifying round	2nd Round

== Stadium ==
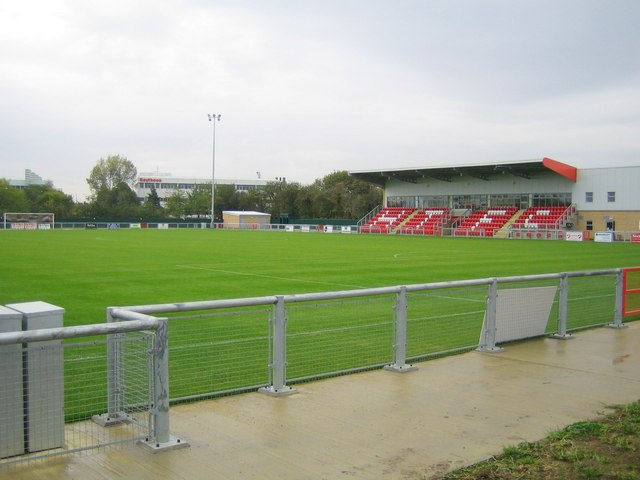
The Harlow Arena, home ground of Harlow Town since 2006

Years	Ground
1879–1960	Green Man Playing Fields
1960–2006	Harlow Sportcentre
2006–present	The Harlow Arena

In their long history, Harlow Town have had three home venues. From the club's formation right up until 1960, the club played their home games at the Green Man Playing Fields, with its first competitive game coming against Bishop's Stortford Nonconformist Grammar School. Harlow Town's last game at its original home was against East Ham United on 30 April 1960, with Harlow winning the game 2–1.

For the start of the 1960–61 season, Harlow had moved to a new home on Hammarskjold Road, to the newly built Harlow Sportcentre, the first Sports Centre in England. The Town's first competitive game in their new home was against Epping Town in the London League on 27 August 1960, with the game finishing in a 1–1 draw. The Sportcentre hosted some of Harlow's greatest moments, including the FA Cup giant-killings of Southend United and Leicester City in the 1979–1980 season. Harlow's final full season at the Sportcentre came in 2005–06, with their last scheduled game against Spalding United in the 2006 East Anglian Cup final, but due to delays at the new ground, the final game at the Sportcentre was on 2 September 2006 in an FA Cup preliminary-round match against Saffron Walden Town, the team Harlow faced in their first ever match.

Eventually, Harlow moved to their new home at Barrow's Farm in October 2006, with the opening match at the new ground on 18 October with Harlow defeating Ware 2–0. The official record attendance at the stadium is 2,149, against Macclesfield Town, then of League Two in the FA Cup first round proper on 8 November 2008; Macclesfield won the game 2–0. In the summer of 2013, following investment from the owners, a brand new 3G playing surface was laid to allow regular use of the pitch by the local community without impacting the turf. This coincided with the re-branding of the ground to The Harlow Arena, as a primary venue for Harlow and its residents.

== Honours ==
- Isthmian League
  - Division One Champions: 1978–79
  - Division One North Play-Off Winners: 2006–07, 2015–16
  - Division Two North Champions: 1988–89
- Athenian League
  - Division One Champions: 1971–72
- Eastern Counties Football League
  - Division One South Champions: 2024-25
  - League Cup Winners: 2023–24
- Essex Senior Cup
  - Winners: 1978–79
- East Anglian Cup
  - Winners: 1989–90, 2001–02, 2005–06
- London League Cup
  - Champions: 1959–60
- West Essex Border Charity Cup
  - Winners: 1923–24
- Spartan League
  - Division One Cup Winners: 1952–53
- East Herts League
  - Division One Champions: 1911–12, 1922–23, 1928–29, 1929–30
  - Challenge Cup Winners: 1929–30, 1930–31, 1931–32
- Stansted & District League
  - Division One Champions: 1923–24, 1924–25, 1927–28, 1928–29
- Rolleston Cup
  - Winners: 1924–25
- Epping Hospital Shield
  - Winners: 1938–39, 1946–47, 1947–48, 1948–49

== Records ==
- Record Victory: 14–0 vs Bishop's Stortford, 11 April 1925
- Record Defeat: 0–11 vs Ware, 6 March 1948
- High-Scoring Draw: 5–5 vs Southall, 1 February 1975
- Highest Attendance (Sportcentre): 9,723 vs Leicester City, 8 January 1980
- Highest Attendance (Harlow Arena): 2,149 vs Macclesfield Town, 8 November 2008
- Highest League finish: 10th in Isthmian Premier Division, 2016–17
- Most Appearances: Norman Gladwin (639), 1951–70
- Most Goals in a Season: Dick Marshall (64), 1928–29
- Consecutive League Wins: 12 (19 December 2015 – 13 February 2016)
- Consecutive League Defeats: 11 (1 January 1977 – 5 March 1977)
- Most Wins in a Season: 31 out of 42 (1978–79)
- Most Draws in a Season: 16 out of 42 (1987–88, 2000–01, 2005–06)
- Most Defeats in a Season: 29 out of 42 (2009–10)
- FA Cup best performance: Fourth round, 1979–80
- FA Trophy best performance: Second round, 1980–81, 1981–82, 1999–2000, 2000–01 (replay), 2001–02 (replay), 2002–03, 2016–17
