= 1973–74 Hellenic Football League =

The 1973–74 Hellenic Football League season was the 21st in the history of the Hellenic Football League, a football competition in England.

== Premier Division ==
Hellenic Football League Premier Division
- Season: 1973–74
- Champions: Moreton Town
- Relegated: Fairford Town; Pressed Steel; Hazells
- Matches: 272
- Goals: 858 (3.15 per match)

The Premier Division featured 13 clubs which competed in the division last season, along with four new clubs, promoted from Division One:

- Burnham
- Ernest Turners Sports
- Hazells
- Thatcham

=== League table ===
Pos	Team	Pld	W	D	L	GF	GA	GR	Pts	Promotion or relegation
1	Moreton Town	32	22	6	4	77	29	2.655	50	
2	Clanfield	32	21	7	4	80	17	4.706	49	
3	Wantage Town	32	20	6	6	49	25	1.960	46	
4	Bicester Town	32	18	4	10	59	45	1.311	40	
5	Didcot Town	32	13	11	8	52	34	1.529	37	
6	Thatcham	32	14	9	9	54	36	1.500	37	
7	Abingdon Town	32	14	7	11	61	40	1.525	35	
8	Hungerford Town	32	13	9	10	54	42	1.286	35	
9	Chipping Norton Town	32	13	9	10	48	50	0.960	35	
10	Pinehurst	32	11	12	9	57	43	1.326	34	
11	Burnham	32	14	6	12	51	47	1.085	34	
12	Wallingford Town	32	10	7	15	51	53	0.962	27	
13	Thame United	32	10	6	16	37	51	0.725	26	
14	Fairford Town	32	8	4	20	46	75	0.613	20	Relegated to Division One
15	Pressed Steel	32	6	3	23	26	86	0.302	15	Relegated to Division One
16	Ernest Turners Sports	32	5	4	23	30	85	0.353	14	Resigned from the league
17	Hazells	32	5	0	27	26	100	0.260	10	Relegated to Division One

Source: rsssf
Rules for classification: 1) points; 2) goal ratio; 3) number of goals scored.

== Division One ==
Hellenic Football League Division One
- Season: 1973–74
- Champions: Cirencester Town
- Promoted: Cirencester Town; Oxford City reserves Newbury Town; Rivet Sports

The Division One featured 11 clubs which competed in the division last season, along with 10 new clubs:

2 clubs relegated from the Premier Division:

- Morris Motors
- Newbury Town

7 clubs promoted from Division Two:

- Walcot
- Maidenhead Social
- Wroughton
- Easington Sports
- Aston Clinton
- Watlington
- Abingdon United

Plus:

- Oxford City reserves

=== League table ===
Pos	Team	Pld	W	D	L	GF	GA	GR	Pts	Promotion or relegation
1	Cirencester Town	40	29	5	6	134	43	3.116	63	Promoted to the Premier Division
2	Oxford City reserves	40	28	6	6	118	49	2.408	62	Promoted to the Premier Division
3	Newbury Town	40	26	9	5	113	46	2.457	61	Promoted to the Premier Division
4	Rivet Sports	40	24	7	9	95	44	2.159	55	Promoted to the Premier Division
5	Walcot	40	19	13	8	79	48	1.646	51	
6	Maidenhead Social	40	20	11	9	73	59	1.237	51	
7	Kidlington	40	19	10	11	75	61	1.230	48	
8	Morris Motors	40	18	9	13	78	55	1.418	45	
9	Easington Sports	40	19	7	14	79	60	1.317	45	
10	Aston Clinton	40	18	8	14	76	67	1.134	44	
11	Waddesdon	40	18	7	15	88	71	1.239	43	Transferred to the South Midlands League
12	Long Wittenham	40	16	10	14	79	66	1.197	42	
13	Oxford University Press	40	17	6	17	72	66	1.091	40	Resigned from the league
14	MG Athletic	40	16	7	17	65	61	1.066	39	
15	Swindon Town 'A'	40	13	8	19	83	73	1.137	34	Resigned from the league
16	Wroughton	40	13	5	22	54	90	0.600	31	Resigned from the league
17	Garsington	40	13	2	25	67	94	0.713	28	Resigned from the league
18	Watlington	40	9	5	26	57	112	0.509	23	
19	Abingdon United	40	5	3	32	46	134	0.343	13	
20	Princes Risborough Town	40	4	4	32	41	129	0.318	12	Resigned from the league
21	Buckingham Athletic	40	2	4	34	35	179	0.196	8	

Source: nonleaguematters
Rules for classification: 1) points; 2) goal ratio; 3) number of goals scored.
