= 1972–73 Hellenic Football League =

The 1972–73 Hellenic Football League season was the 20th in the history of the Hellenic Football League, a football competition in England.

== Premier Division ==
Hellenic Football League Premier Division
- Season: 1972–73
- Champions: Witney Town
- Promoted: Witney Town
- Relegated: Morris Motors; Newbury Town
- Matches: 272
- Goals: 875 (3.22 per match)

The Premier Division featured 15 clubs which competed in the division last season, along with two new clubs:

- Chipping Norton Town, promoted from Division One B
- Fairford Town, promoted from Division One A

=== League table ===
Pos	Team	Pld	W	D	L	GF	GA	GR	Pts	Promotion or relegation
1	Witney Town	32	26	4	2	100	26	3.846	56	Promoted to the Southern Football League
2	Clanfield	32	23	5	4	81	28	2.893	51	
3	Hungerford Town	32	18	4	10	64	42	1.524	40	
4	Wallingford Town	32	17	6	9	64	45	1.422	40	
5	Didcot Town	32	17	5	10	56	41	1.366	39	
6	Abingdon Town	32	12	11	9	60	42	1.429	35	
7	Thame United	32	10	11	11	42	46	0.913	31	
8	Pinehurst	32	12	6	14	55	51	1.078	30	
9	Pressed Steel	32	8	14	10	38	45	0.844	30	
10	Wantage Town	32	9	9	14	42	61	0.689	27	
11	Chippenham Town	32	8	10	14	45	64	0.703	26	Transferred to the Western Football League
12	Bicester Town	32	8	9	15	33	43	0.767	25	
13	Chipping Norton Town	32	9	7	16	33	67	0.493	25	
14	Fairford Town	32	7	10	15	36	51	0.706	24	
15	Moreton Town	32	8	7	17	44	73	0.603	23	
16	Morris Motors	32	10	3	19	43	78	0.551	23	Relegated to Division One
17	Newbury Town	32	7	5	20	39	72	0.542	19	Relegated to Division One

Source: rsssf
Rules for classification: 1) points; 2) goal ratio; 3) number of goals scored.

== Division One ==
Hellenic Football League Division One
- Season: 1972–73
- Champions: Thatcham
- Promoted: Thatcham; Burnham; Ernest Turners Sports; Hazells

The Division One featured 16 clubs, including 14 clubs from the previous season's Division One A and Division One B and 2 clubs relegated from the Premier Division:

Clubs relegated from the Premier Division:

- Cirencester Town
- Buckingham Athletic

Clubs transferred from Division One A:

- Burnham
- Ernest Turners Sports
- Thatcham
- Long Wittenham
- Swindon Town 'A'
- Hazells
- MG Athletic

Clubs transferred from Division One B:

- Rivet Sports
- Waddesdon
- Princes Risborough Town
- Kidlington
- Garsington
- Oxford University Press
- AC Delco

=== League table ===
Pos	Team	Pld	W	D	L	GF	GA	GR	Pts	Promotion or relegation
1	Thatcham	30	21	6	3	62	16	3.875	48	Promoted to the Premier Division
2	Burnham	30	20	6	4	73	31	2.355	46	Promoted to the Premier Division
3	Ernest Turners Sports	30	18	6	6	66	37	1.784	42	Promoted to the Premier Division
4	Hazells	30	17	3	10	64	41	1.561	37	Promoted to the Premier Division
5	Waddesdon	30	17	1	12	54	46	1.174	35	
6	Long Wittenham	30	15	3	12	52	49	1.061	33	
7	Swindon Town 'A'	30	15	2	13	65	47	1.383	32	
8	MG Athletic	30	12	6	12	39	43	0.907	30	
9	Cirencester Town	30	13	4	13	50	64	0.781	30	
10	Oxford University Press	30	12	4	14	38	46	0.826	28	
11	Rivet Sports	30	12	3	15	65	50	1.300	27	
12	Kidlington	30	13	1	16	43	41	1.049	27	
13	Princes Risborough Town	30	8	9	13	30	47	0.638	25	
14	AC Delco	30	7	6	17	35	72	0.486	20	Transferred to the South Midlands League
15	Garsington	30	4	6	20	37	77	0.481	14	
16	Buckingham Athletic	30	1	4	25	25	101	0.248	6	

Source: nonleaguematters
Rules for classification: 1) points; 2) goal ratio; 3) number of goals scored.

== Division Two ==
Hellenic Football League Division Two
- Season: 1972–73
- Champions: Walcot
- Promoted: Walcot; Maidenhead Social; Wroughton; Easington Sports; Aston Clinton; Watlington; Abingdon United

The Division Two featured 11 clubs, including 8 clubs relegated from the previous season's Division One A and Division One B and 3 clubs joined Division Two:

Clubs relegated from Division One A:

- Abingdon United
- Marston United
- Easington Sports

Clubs relegated from Division One B:

- Watlington
- Maidenhead Social
- Aston Clinton
- Stokenchurch
- A G R G Harwell

Clubs joined Division Two:

- The 61 FC Luton
- Walcot
- Wroughton

=== League table ===
Pos	Team	Pld	W	D	L	GF	GA	GR	Pts	Promotion or relegation
1	Walcot	20	17	2	1	78	29	2.690	36	Promoted to Division One
2	Maidenhead Social	20	12	5	3	38	20	1.900	29	Promoted to Division One
3	Stokenchurch	20	11	4	5	46	31	1.484	26	Resigned from the league
4	The 61 FC Luton	20	12	1	7	53	27	1.963	25	Transferred to the South Midlands League
5	Wroughton	20	10	3	7	36	30	1.200	23	Promoted to Division One
6	Easington Sports	20	10	2	8	48	35	1.371	22	Promoted to Division One
7	Aston Clinton	20	7	2	11	30	39	0.769	16	Promoted to Division One
8	Watlington	20	6	3	11	29	39	0.744	15	Promoted to Division One
9	Abingdon United	20	5	3	12	27	46	0.587	13	Promoted to Division One
10	Marston United	20	5	1	14	29	50	0.580	11	Resigned from the league
11	A G R G Harwell	20	1	2	17	14	82	0.171	4	Resigned from the league

Source: nonleaguematters
Rules for classification: 1) points; 2) goal ratio; 3) number of goals scored.
