= 1976–77 Hellenic Football League =

The 1976–77 Hellenic Football League season was the 24th in the history of the Hellenic Football League, a football competition in England.

== Premier Division ==
Hellenic Football League Premier Division
- Season: 1976–77
- Champions: Moreton Town
- Relegated: Hazells
- Matches: 240
- Goals: 727 (3.03 per match)

The Premier Division featured 13 clubs which competed in the division last season, along with three new clubs, promoted from Division One:

- Abingdon Town
- Fairford Town
- Hazells

=== League table ===
Pos	Team	Pld	W	D	L	GF	GA	GR	Pts	Promotion or relegation
1	Moreton Town	30	22	2	6	62	25	2.480	68	
2	Thame United	30	20	4	6	54	26	2.077	64	
3	Burnham	30	17	10	3	67	33	2.030	61	Transferred to the Athenian League
4	Chipping Norton Town	30	15	10	5	60	28	2.143	55	
5	Hungerford Town	30	13	8	9	53	35	1.514	47	
6	Clanfield	30	12	6	12	47	52	0.904	42	
7	Newbury Town	30	11	7	12	54	44	1.227	40	
8	Pinehurst	30	8	14	8	44	43	1.023	38	
9	Cirencester Town	30	10	6	14	37	62	0.597	36	
10	Wallingford Town	30	9	7	14	33	37	0.892	34	
11	Forest Green Rovers	30	8	9	13	44	50	0.880	33	
12	Abingdon Town	30	8	8	14	34	42	0.810	32	
13	Fairford Town	30	8	8	14	35	45	0.778	32	
14	Thatcham Town	30	7	8	15	33	62	0.532	29	
15	Stratford Town	30	7	7	16	35	65	0.538	28	Transferred to the Midland Football Combination
16	Hazells	30	5	6	19	35	78	0.449	21	Relegated to Division One

Source: rsssf
Rules for classification: 1) points; 2) goal ratio; 3) number of goals scored.

== Division One ==
Hellenic Football League Division One
- Season: 1976–77
- Champions: Didcot Town
- Promoted: Didcot Town; Flackwell Heath; Abingdon United

The Division One featured 10 clubs which competed in the division last season, along with 6 new clubs:

- Didcot Town, relegated from the Premier Division
- Wantage Town, relegated from the Premier Division
- Bicester Town, relegated from the Premier Division
- Flackwell Heath, joined from the High Wycombe and District League
- Garrard Athletic
- Dowty Staverton

=== League table ===
Pos	Team	Pld	W	D	L	GF	GA	GR	Pts	Promotion or relegation
1	Didcot Town	30	21	5	4	73	21	3.476	68	Promoted to the Premier Division
2	Flackwell Heath	30	20	6	4	79	31	2.548	66	Promoted to the Premier Division
3	Abingdon United	30	19	4	7	75	37	2.027	61	Promoted to the Premier Division
4	Garrard Athletic	30	18	5	7	82	38	2.158	59	
5	Kidlington	30	16	4	10	47	33	1.424	52	
6	Bicester Town	30	15	6	9	44	33	1.333	51	
7	Easington Sports	30	14	4	12	60	59	1.017	46	
8	Rivet Sports	30	12	6	12	53	49	1.082	42	
9	Wantage Town	30	10	10	10	47	53	0.887	40	
10	Maidenhead Town	30	10	9	11	44	45	0.978	39	
11	Pressed Steel	30	11	2	17	58	65	0.892	35	
12	Watlington	30	9	5	16	50	69	0.725	32	Resigned from the league
13	Aston Clinton	30	9	4	17	32	61	0.525	31	
14	Morris Motors	30	6	9	15	37	60	0.617	27	
15	Dowty Staverton	30	6	5	19	42	72	0.583	23	
16	Buckingham Athletic	30	1	2	27	19	127	0.150	5	

Source: nonleaguematters
Rules for classification: 1) points; 2) goal ratio; 3) number of goals scored.
