= 1975–76 Hellenic Football League =

The 1975–76 Hellenic Football League season was the 23rd in the history of the Hellenic Football League, a football competition in England.

== Premier Division ==
Hellenic Football League Premier Division
- Season: 1975–76
- Champions: Burnham
- Relegated: Didcot Town; Wantage Town; Bicester Town
- Matches: 240
- Goals: 713 (2.97 per match)

The Premier Division featured 14 clubs which competed in the division last season, along with two new clubs:

- Forest Green Rovers, joined from the Gloucestershire County League
- Stratford Town, transferred from the Midland Combination

=== League table ===
| Pos | Team | Pld | W | D | L | GF | GA | GR | Pts | Promotion or relegation |
|---|---|---|---|---|---|---|---|---|---|---|
| 1 | Burnham | 30 | 19 | 8 | 3 | 62 | 20 | 3.100 | 65 | |
| 2 | Moreton Town | 30 | 15 | 9 | 6 | 52 | 34 | 1.529 | 54 | |
| 3 | Clanfield | 30 | 14 | 10 | 6 | 47 | 29 | 1.621 | 52 | |
| 4 | Forest Green Rovers | 30 | 14 | 10 | 6 | 82 | 53 | 1.547 | 52 | |
| 5 | Newbury Town | 30 | 14 | 9 | 7 | 54 | 37 | 1.459 | 51 | |
| 6 | Chipping Norton Town | 30 | 14 | 8 | 8 | 46 | 37 | 1.243 | 50 | |
| 7 | Hungerford Town | 30 | 11 | 12 | 7 | 40 | 31 | 1.290 | 45 | |
| 8 | Thame United | 30 | 11 | 10 | 9 | 43 | 44 | 0.977 | 43 | |
| 9 | Thatcham Town | 30 | 12 | 7 | 11 | 36 | 45 | 0.800 | 43 | |
| 10 | Stratford Town | 30 | 9 | 11 | 10 | 49 | 44 | 1.114 | 38 | |
| 11 | Wallingford Town | 30 | 9 | 9 | 12 | 33 | 44 | 0.750 | 36 | |
| 12 | Cirencester Town | 30 | 9 | 6 | 15 | 41 | 59 | 0.695 | 33 | |
| 13 | Pinehurst | 30 | 8 | 7 | 15 | 43 | 50 | 0.860 | 31 | |
| 14 | Didcot Town | 30 | 6 | 8 | 16 | 27 | 39 | 0.692 | 26 | Relegated to Division One |
| 15 | Wantage Town | 30 | 3 | 11 | 16 | 29 | 62 | 0.468 | 20 | Relegated to Division One |
| 16 | Bicester Town | 30 | 2 | 5 | 23 | 29 | 85 | 0.341 | 11 | Relegated to Division One |

Source: rsssf
Rules for classification: 1) points; 2) goal ratio; 3) number of goals scored.

== Division One ==
Hellenic Football League Division One
- Season: 1975–76
- Champions: Abingdon Town
- Promoted: Abingdon Town; Fairford Town; Hazells

The Division One featured 12 clubs which competed in the division last season, along with 2 new clubs:

- Rivet Sports, relegated from the Premier Division
- Abingdon Town, relegated from the Premier Division

=== League table ===
| Pos | Team | Pld | W | D | L | GF | GA | GR | Pts | Promotion or relegation |
|---|---|---|---|---|---|---|---|---|---|---|
| 1 | Abingdon Town | 26 | 22 | 3 | 1 | 53 | 12 | 4.417 | 69 | Promoted to the Premier Division |
| 2 | Fairford Town | 26 | 19 | 4 | 3 | 52 | 12 | 4.333 | 61 | Promoted to the Premier Division |
| 3 | Hazells | 26 | 15 | 5 | 6 | 53 | 23 | 2.304 | 50 | Promoted to the Premier Division |
| 4 | Rivet Sports | 26 | 14 | 7 | 5 | 40 | 31 | 1.290 | 49 | |
| 5 | Abingdon United | 26 | 11 | 3 | 12 | 46 | 45 | 1.022 | 36 | |
| 6 | Pressed Steel | 26 | 11 | 3 | 12 | 41 | 56 | 0.732 | 36 | |
| 7 | Maidenhead Town | 26 | 9 | 5 | 12 | 37 | 49 | 0.755 | 32 | |
| 8 | Morris Motors | 26 | 7 | 9 | 10 | 33 | 32 | 1.031 | 30 | |
| 9 | Watlington | 26 | 9 | 3 | 14 | 50 | 57 | 0.877 | 30 | |
| 10 | Easington Sports | 26 | 8 | 5 | 13 | 43 | 52 | 0.827 | 29 | |
| 11 | Kidlington | 26 | 8 | 4 | 14 | 37 | 50 | 0.740 | 28 | |
| 12 | MG Athletic | 26 | 6 | 7 | 13 | 24 | 34 | 0.706 | 25 | Resigned from the league |
| 13 | Aston Clinton | 26 | 6 | 6 | 14 | 37 | 53 | 0.698 | 24 | |
| 14 | Buckingham Athletic | 26 | 4 | 2 | 20 | 26 | 66 | 0.394 | 14 | |

Source: nonleaguematters
Rules for classification: 1) points; 2) goal ratio; 3) number of goals scored.
