= 1981–82 Hellenic Football League =

The 1981–82 Hellenic Football League season was the 29th in the history of the Hellenic Football League, a football competition in England.

== Premier Division ==
Hellenic Football League Premier Division
- Season: 1981–82
- Champions: Forest Green Rovers
- Promoted: Forest Green Rovers
- Relegated: Kidlington
- Matches: 240
- Goals: 625 (2.6 per match)

The Premier Division featured 14 clubs which competed in the division last season, along with two new clubs, promoted from Division One:

- Clanfield
- Wantage Town

=== League table ===
Pos	Team	Pld	W	D	L	GF	GA	GD	Pts	Promotion or relegation
1	Forest Green Rovers	30	23	1	6	71	20	+51	47	Promoted to the Southern Football League
2	Moreton Town	30	13	13	4	44	32	+12	39	
3	Wantage Town	30	14	10	6	42	28	+14	38	
4	Newbury Town	30	14	8	8	62	38	+24	36	Transferred to the Athenian League
5	Maidenhead Town	30	14	6	10	46	34	+12	34	
6	Fairford Town	30	12	10	8	41	29	+12	34	
7	Abingdon Town	30	13	7	10	34	32	+2	33	
8	Flackwell Heath	30	11	10	9	27	30	−3	32	Transferred to the Athenian League
9	Thame United	30	9	10	11	40	39	+1	28	
10	Bicester Town	30	9	10	11	40	42	−2	28	
11	Wallingford Town	30	11	5	14	40	54	−14	27	
12	Clanfield	30	8	8	14	33	53	−20	24	
13	Northwood	30	9	3	18	35	47	−12	21	
14	Hazells	30	7	7	16	26	51	−25	21	
15	Didcot Town	30	5	10	15	18	40	−22	20	
16	Kidlington	30	6	6	18	26	56	−30	18	Relegated to Division One

Source: rsssf
Rules for classification: 1) points; 2) goal difference; 3) number of goals scored.

== Division One ==
Hellenic Football League Division One
- Season: 1981–82
- Champions: Lambourn Sports
- Promoted: Lambourn Sports; Abingdon United

The Division One featured 13 clubs which competed in the division last season, along with 3 new clubs:

- Morris Motors, relegated from the Premier Division
- Abingdon United, relegated from the Premier Division
- Badminton Picksons

=== League table ===
Pos	Team	Pld	W	D	L	GF	GA	GD	Pts	Promotion or relegation
1	Lambourn Sports	30	21	4	5	65	30	+35	46	Promoted to the Premier Division
2	Abingdon United	30	18	6	6	68	40	+28	42	Promoted to the Premier Division
3	Viking Sports	30	17	6	7	59	40	+19	40	
4	Milton Keynes Borough	30	17	5	8	63	36	+27	39	
5	Badminton Picksons	30	16	5	9	65	35	+30	37	
6	Brackley Town	30	15	7	8	47	29	+18	37	
7	Cirencester Town	30	12	10	8	54	37	+17	34	
8	Rayners Lane	30	14	6	10	47	35	+12	34	
9	Morris Motors	30	13	6	11	57	59	−2	32	
10	Lydney Town	30	8	15	7	38	34	+4	31	
11	Thatcham Town	30	11	6	13	54	53	+1	28	Transferred to the Athenian League
12	Pressed Steel	30	6	9	15	39	50	−11	21	
13	Dowty Staverton	30	7	5	18	31	57	−26	19	
14	Worrall Hill	30	7	5	18	40	81	−41	19	
15	A.F.C. Aldermaston	30	3	8	19	31	75	−44	14	
16	Easington Sports	30	2	3	25	21	88	−67	7	

Source: nonleaguematters
Rules for classification: 1) points; 2) goal ratio; 3) number of goals scored.
