= 1974–75 Hellenic Football League =

The 1974–75 Hellenic Football League season was the 22nd in the history of the Hellenic Football League, a football competition in England. It was also the first season in which the Hellenic League used three points for a win.

== Premier Division ==
Hellenic Football League Premier Division
- Season: 1974–75
- Champions: Thatcham Town
- Relegated: Abingdon Town; Rivet Sports
- Matches: 272
- Goals: 820 (3.01 per match)

The Premier Division featured 13 clubs which competed in the division last season, along with four new clubs, promoted from Division One:

- Cirencester Town
- Newbury Town
- Oxford City reserves
- Rivet Sports

Also, Thatcham changed name to Thatcham Town.

=== League table ===
Pos	Team	Pld	W	D	L	GF	GA	GR	Pts	Promotion or relegation
1	Thatcham Town	32	22	4	6	49	24	2.042	70	
2	Moreton Town	32	21	5	6	71	26	2.731	68	
3	Burnham	32	16	9	7	56	41	1.366	57	
4	Clanfield	32	15	5	12	60	48	1.250	50	
5	Newbury Town	32	15	4	13	50	46	1.087	49	
6	Chipping Norton Town	32	14	6	12	54	40	1.350	48	
7	Wantage Town	32	14	5	13	43	41	1.049	47	
8	Pinehurst	32	14	5	13	35	43	0.814	47	
9	Bicester Town	32	13	4	15	61	57	1.070	43	
10	Wallingford Town	32	11	9	12	41	45	0.911	42	
11	Didcot Town	32	11	6	15	46	59	0.780	39	
12	Thame United	32	11	5	16	44	52	0.846	38	
13	Cirencester Town	32	11	5	16	49	64	0.766	38	
14	Hungerford Town	32	10	4	18	40	55	0.727	34	
15	Rivet Sports	32	10	4	18	36	65	0.554	34	Relegated to Division One
16	Oxford City reserves	32	8	8	16	48	63	0.762	32	Resigned from the league
17	Abingdon Town	32	8	8	16	37	51	0.725	32	Relegated to Division One

Source: rsssf
Rules for classification: 1) points; 2) goal ratio; 3) number of goals scored.

== Division One ==
Hellenic Football League Division One
- Season: 1974–75
- Champions: Maidenhead Town

The Division One featured 11 clubs which competed in the division last season, along with 3 new clubs:

- Fairford Town, relegated from the Premier Division
- Pressed Steel, relegated from the Premier Division
- Hazells, relegated from the Premier Division

=== League table ===
Pos	Team	Pld	W	D	L	GF	GA	GR	Pts	Promotion or relegation
1	Maidenhead Town	26	20	4	2	69	19	3.632	64	
2	Morris Motors	26	17	6	3	50	14	3.571	57	
3	Easington Sports	26	14	3	9	52	33	1.576	45	
4	Hazells	26	12	8	6	48	27	1.778	44	
5	Kidlington	26	13	5	8	47	31	1.516	44	
6	Aston Clinton	26	10	7	9	51	40	1.275	37	
7	Walcot	26	9	9	8	44	40	1.100	36	Resigned from the league
8	Long Wittenham	26	10	6	10	50	47	1.064	36	Resigned from the league
9	Fairford Town	26	9	6	11	25	39	0.641	33	
10	Pressed Steel	26	10	2	14	51	59	0.864	32	
11	Watlington	26	8	8	10	34	45	0.756	32	
12	Abingdon United	26	8	5	13	40	51	0.784	29	
13	MG Athletic	26	3	5	18	27	66	0.409	14	
14	Buckingham Athletic	26	1	2	23	15	92	0.163	5	

Source: nonleaguematters
Rules for classification: 1) points; 2) goal ratio; 3) number of goals scored.
