= List of Chippenham Town F.C. seasons =

Chippenham Town FC are an English football club based in Chippenham, Wiltshire, which plays in the Southern League Premier Division, the seventh highest tier in the English league system. They are nicknamed the Bluebirds and play their home matches at Hardenhuish Park. They are most noted as being the oldest football club in the South West of England. Their home kit consists of a blue shirt, blue shorts and blue socks.

== Key ==
Top scorer and number of goals scored shown in bold when he was also top scorer for the division.

Key to league record

- Lvl = Level of the league in the current league system
- S = Numbers of seasons
- Pld = Games played
- W = Games won
- D = Games drawn
- L = Games lost
- GF = Goals for
- GA = Goals against
- GD = Goals difference
- Pts = Points
- Position = Position in the final league table
- Overall position = Overall club position in the English league system

Key to cup records

- Res = Final reached round
- Rec = Final club record in the form of wins-draws-losses
- PR = Premilinary round
- QR1 = Qualifying round 1
- QR2 = Qualifying round 2
- QR3 = Qualifying round 3
- QR4 = Qualifying round 4
- R1 = Round 1
- R2 = Round 2
- R3 = Round 3
- R4 = Round 4
- R5 = Round 5
- R6 = Round 6
- QF = Quarter-finals
- SF = Semi-finals
- RU = Runners-up
- W = Winners
- Average home attendance = for league games only

== Seasons ==
=== Notes on timeline ===
The club joined Division Two of the Western League in 1904, but also continued to play in the Wiltshire League.
At the end of the 1905–06 season the club withdrew from the Western League.
Most competitive football was suspended in England between 1940 and 1945 due to World War II.
In the 1946-47 season the club did not play 3 of the scheduled matches due to the harshness of the weather.
In the 1947-48 season the club did not play the scheduled match against Soundwell.
The departures of 13 clubs from the Western League in 1960 meant that Division 2 was scrapped. The 20 remaining clubs + Exeter City Reserves became members of a single section competition, hence no promotion is recorded here. The club, between the 1964-65 season and the beginning of the 1968-69 season, left the Western League and rejoined the Wiltshire League.
At the end of the 1972-73 season, the club transferred to the Western League. The 1989-90 season saw the introduction of 3 points for a win.
The introduction of the English Football League pyramid system started around 1991 at which point the club were competing at Level 8
The Western League Premier Division became a Level 9 league in 2007 due to re-organisation of the lower league system. Seasons where the club were successful in gaining promotion or winning a trophy are highlighted in green and relegation in red.

Year	League	Lvl	Pld	W	D	L	GF	GA	GD	Pts	Position	Top league scorer		FA Cup		FA Trophy		FA Vase		Average home attendance
Year	League	Lvl	Pld	W	D	L	GF	GA	GD	Pts	Position	Name	Goals	Res	Rec	Res	Rec	Res	Rec	Average home attendance
1904-05	Wiltshire League Division 1	N/A	20	7	2	11	56	55	+1	16	9th of 11									
1904-05	Western League Division 2	N/A	16	2	0	14	24	74	-50	4	9th of 9 Last place									
1905-06	Wiltshire League Division 1	N/A	22	11	7	4	56	33	+23	29	3rd of 12									
1905-06	Western League Division 2	N/A	18	5	2	11	23	47	-24	12	8th of 10									
1906-07	Wiltshire League Division 1	N/A	22	10	3	9	43	41	+2	23	6th of 12									
1907-08	Wiltshire League Division 1	N/A	18	12	4	2	60	22	+38	28	1st of 10; **Champions**									
1908-09	Wiltshire League Division 1	N/A	16	12	2	2	49	17	+32	26	1st of 9; **Champions**									
1909-10	Wiltshire League Division 1	N/A	20	12	4	4	54	31	+23	28	2nd of 11									
1910-11; Records incomplete	Wiltshire League Division 1	N/A	17	7	2	8	41	36	+5	16	5th of 10									
1911-12	Wiltshire League Division 1	N/A	18	7	4	7	35	36	-1	18	6th of 10									
1912-13	Wiltshire League Division 1	N/A	20	9	7	4	58	28	+30	25	2nd of 11									
1913-1919	No competitions																			
1919-20	Wiltshire League Division 1	N/A	20	9	6	5	39	26	+13	24	4th of 11									
1920-21	Wiltshire League Division 1	N/A	26	12	5	9	51	44	+7	29	7th of 14									
1921-22	Wiltshire League Division 1	N/A	27	17	4	6	67	23	+44	38	2nd of 15									
1922-23	Wiltshire League Division 1	N/A	26	14	5	7	58	41	+17	33	2nd of 14									
1923-24	Wiltshire League Division 1	N/A																		
1924-25	Wiltshire League Division 1	N/A																		
1925-26	Wiltshire League Division 1	N/A																		
1926-27	Wiltshire League Division 1	N/A																		
1927-28	Wiltshire League Division 1	N/A	28	15	2	11	85	71	+14	32	6th of 15									
1928-29	Wiltshire League Division 1	N/A	28	19	5	4	100	39	+61	43	1st of 15; **Champions**									
1929-30	Wiltshire League Division 1	N/A																		
1930-31	Western League Division 2	N/A	32	10	8	14	82	68	+14	28	10th of 17									
1931-32	Western League Division 2	N/A	34	11	6	17	99	105	-6	28	12th of 18									
1932-33	Western League Division 2	N/A	34	9	5	20	71	99	-28	23	17th of 18									
1933-34	Western League Division 2	N/A	34	11	3	20	73	95	-22	25	16th of 18									
1934-35	Western League Division 2	N/A	34	7	3	24	53	126	-73	17	17th of 18									
1935-36	Western League Division 2	N/A	34	6	1	27	64	147	-83	13	18th of 18; Last place									
1936-37	Western League Division 2	N/A	34	11	3	20	71	98	-27	25	12th of 18									
1937-38	Western League Division 2	N/A	34	18	4	12	91	90	+1	40	6th of 18									
1938-39	Western League Division 2	N/A	34	8	3	23	56	87	-31	19	18th of 18; Last place									
1939-40	Western League	N/A	20	7	2	11	51	78	-27	16	7th of 11									
1940 - 1945	No Competitions																			
1945-46	Western Premier League	N/A	26	15	4	7	84	41	+43	34	2nd of 14			2Q	2–0–1					
1946-47	Western League Division 1	8	31	20	2	9	115	68	+47	42	4th of 18			PR	0–0–1					
1947-48	Western League Division 1	8	33	8	6	19	65	97	-32	22	16th of 18			PR	1–0–1					
1948-49	Western League Division 1	8	34	19	5	10	94	50	+44	43	4th of 18									
1949-50	Western League Division 1	8	34	13	7	14	77	70	+7	33	8th of 18			1Q	2–1–1					
1950-51	Western League Division 1	8	34	18	8	8	86	48	+38	44	3rd of 18			PR	1–0–1					
1951-52	Western League Division 1	8	34	23	4	7	103	41	+62	50	1st of 18; **Champions**			1R	5–2–1					
1952-53	Western League Division 1	8	32	17	3	12	84	58	+26	37	5th of 17			2Q	2–0–1					
1953-54	Western League Division 1	8	34	18	5	11	79	49	+30	41	5th of 18			4Q	4–0–1					
1954-55	Western League Division 1	8	34	21	7	6	83	39	+44	49	2nd of 18			PR	0–0–1					
1955-56	Western League Division 1	8	32	20	4	8	70	50	+20	41	4th of 17			1Q	0–1–1					
1956-57	Western League Division 1	8	36	16	7	13	77	67	+10	39	8th of 19			4Q	4–1–1					
1957-58	Western League Division 1	8	36	13	7	16	71	74	-3	33	15th of 19			2Q	1–1–1					
1958-59	Western League Division 1	8	36	20	3	13	104	66	+38	43	6th of 19			3Q	2–1–1					
1959-60	Western League Division 1	8	36	18	6	12	70	56	+14	42	3rd of 19			1Q	0–0–1					
1960-61	Western League	8	40	18	5	17	79	81	-2	41	12th of 21			1Q	0–1–1					
1961-62	Western League	8	38	17	6	15	79	71	+8	40	9th of 20			3Q	1–1–1					
1962-63	Western League	8	42	15	12	15	92	60	+32	42	12th of 22			3Q	2–1–1					
1963-64	Western League	8	42	15	8	19	75	62	+13	38	13th of 22			2Q	1–1–1					
1964-65	Western League	8	42	16	8	18	75	82	-7	40	13th of 22			2Q	0–0–1					
1965-66	Wiltshire Premier League	9	36	21	6	9	104	51	+53	48	3rd of 19			2Q	1–0–1					
1966-67	Wiltshire Premier League	9	32	22	6	4	102	50	+52	50				2Q	1–0–1					
1967-68	Wiltshire Premier League	9	26	15	5	6	82	29	+53	35	3rd of 14			2Q	1–1–1					
1968-69	Hellenic League Premier Division	8	32	17	5	10	84	50	+34	39	5th of 17			1Q	0–0–1					
1969-70	Hellenic League Premier Division	8	34	14	6	14	63	66	-3	34	9th of 18			3Q	2–2–1	1Q	0–0–1			
1970-71	Hellenic League Premier Division	8	34	21	6	7	72	42	+30	48	4th of 18					1Q	0–0–1			
1971-72	Hellenic League Premier Division	8	32	15	7	10	54	49	+5	37	5th of 17			1Q	1–0–1	1Q	0–0–1			
1972-73	Hellenic League Premier Division	8	32	8	10	14	45	64	-19	26	11th of 17			1Q	0–0–1					
1973-74	Western League	8	36	3	6	27	25	82	-57	12	19th of 19; No relegation possible			1Q	0–0–1	1Q	0–0–1			
1974-75	Western League	8	40	10	12	18	55	85	-30	42	15th of 21			2Q	1–0–1	2Q	1–0–1			
1975-76	Western League	8	44	12	7	25	66	94	-28	43	20th of 23			1Q	0–0–1	PR	0–0–1			
1976-77	Western League Division 1	9	34	17	6	11	53	43	+10	57	5th of 18			1Q	0–0–1			2R	0–0–1	
1977-78	Western League Division 1	9	36	8	4	24	40	74	-34	28	19th of 19; No relegation possible			1Q	0–0–1			1R	0–0–1	
1978-79	Western League Division 1	9	36	19	7	10	56	43	+13	64	4th of 19			1Q	0–1–1			PR	0–0–1	
1979-80	Western League Division 1	9	42	16	10	16	58	62	-4	42	11th of 22			1Q	0–0–1			1R	1–0–1	
1980-81	Western League Division 1	9	36	25	8	3	76	24	+52	58	1st of 19; Promoted			1Q	1–1–1			1R	1–0–1	
1981-82	Western League Premier Division	8	38	12	9	17	33	39	-6	33	14th of 20			PR	0–0–1			2R	2–0–1	
1982-83	Western League Premier Division	8	38	12	8	18	40	54	-14	32	13th of 20			1Q	0–1–1			2R	2–0–1	
1983-84	Western League Premier Division	8	38	13	8	17	44	56	-12	34	16th of 20			PR	0–1–1			2R	2–0–1	
1984-85	Western League Premier Division	8	42	16	14	12	62	49	+13	46	7th of 22			4Q	4–1–1			1R	1–0–1	
1985-86	Western League Premier Division	8	42	21	10	11	60	44	+16	52	5th of 22			3Q	2–1–1			4R	3–0–1	
1986-87	Western League Premier Division	8	42	14	14	14	53	50	+3	42	9th of 22			2Q	1–1–1			2R	1–0–1	
1987-88	Western League Premier Division	8	42	10	8	24	35	62	-27	28	20th of 22			PR	0–0–1			1R	0–0–1	
1988-89	Western League Premier Division	8	40	11	14	15	48	52	-4	36	12th of 21			1Q	1–0–1			3R	3–1–1	
1989-90	Western League Premier Division	8	40	14	7	19	36	46	-10	49	13th of 21			1Q	1–1–1			1R	1–0–1	
1990-91	Western League Premier Division	8	40	10	12	18	42	64	-22	42	17th of 21			1Q	0–1–1			1R	1–1–1	
1991-92	Western League Premier Division	8	40	13	7	20	58	95	-37	46	14th of 21			PR	0–0–1			2R	2–0–1	
1992-93	Western League Premier Division	8	38	8	14	16	65	86	-21	38	16th of 20			1QR	1–0–1			PR	0–0–1	
1993-94	Western League Premier Division	8	34	14	7	13	58	51	+7	49	8th of 18			1QR	1–1–1			1R	1–2–1	
1994-95	Western League Premier Division	8	34	14	9	11	54	54	0	51	8th of 18			PR	0–0–1			1R	1–0–1	
1995-96	Western League Premier Division	8	34	11	12	11	53	41	+8	45	10th of 18			PR	0–2–1			3R	4–0–1	
1996-97	Western League Premier Division	8	34	12	12	10	58	52	+6	48	5th of 8			PR	0–0–1			3R	3–0–1	
1997-98	Western League Premier Division	8	38	13	11	14	53	57	-4	50	12th of 20			3QR	3–2–1			3R	2–1–1	
1998-99	Western League Premier Division	8	38	25	7	6	93	41	+52	82	3rd of 20			PR	0–0–1			1R	0–0–1	
1999-2000	Western League Premier Division	8	36	18	9	9	69	41	+28	63	4th of 19			3 QR	3–1–1			Final	8–1–1	
2000-01	Western League Premier Division	8	38	30	5	3	109	27	+82	95	2nd of 20; Promoted			QR2	2–2–1			QF	4–0–1	
2001–02	Southern Football League Division One West	7	40	26	9	5	81	28	+53	87	**2nd of 21**; Promoted			QR2	1-0-1	R1	0-0-1			
2002–03	Southern Football League; Premier Division	6	42	17	17	8	59	37	+22	68	**5th of 22**			QR2	0-0-1	R2	1-0-1			
2003–04	Southern Football League; Premier Division	6	42	10	17	15	51	63	-12	47	**21st of 22**			QR3	1-0-1	R2	0-0-1			–
2004–05	Southern Football League; Premier Division	7	42	22	9	11	81	55	+26	75	**2nd of 22**; Lost in playoff final			QR2	1-0-1	R1	0-0-1			–
2005–06	Southern Football League; Premier Division	7	42	22	11	9	69	45	+24	77	**4th of 22**; Lost in playoff final			R1	4-1-1	QR3	2-1-1			
2006–07	Southern Football League; Premier Division	7	42	19	9	14	61	56	+5	66	**7th of 22**			QR2	1-0-1	QR2	1-2-1			509
2007–08	Southern Football League; Premier Division	7	42	20	13	9	73	44	+29	73	**4th of 22**; Lost in playoff semifinal			QR4	3-1-1	QR3	2-0-1			489
2008–09	Southern Football League; Premier Division	7	42	20	8	14	64	51	+13	65*	**8th of 22**	David Pratt	16	QR3	2-1-1	QR2	1-1-1			420
2009–10	Southern Football League; Premier Division	7	42	21	11	10	67	43	+24	74	**3rd of 22**; Lost in playoff final	Lewis Powell	23	QR4	3-1-1	R2	4-1-1			411
2010–11	Southern Football League; Premier Division	7	40	18	14	8	54	41	+13	68	**7th of 21**	Lewis Powell	14	QR2	1-0-1	QR2	1-2-1			411
2011–12	Southern Football League; Premier Division	7	42	14	11	17	55	53	+2	53	**11th of 22**	Alan Griffin	19	QR1	0-0-1	R1	2-4-1			372
2012–13	Southern Football League; Premier Division	7	42	13	12	17	63	67	-4	51	**15th of 22**	Alan Griffin	17	QR4	3-0-1	QR2	1-0-1			328
2013–14	Southern Football League; Premier Division	7	44	14	6	24	59	87	-28	48	**18th of 23**	Alan Griffin	20	QR1	0-0-1	QR2	1-0-1			319
2014–15	Southern Football League; Premier Division	7	44	16	13	15	54	54	0	61	**11th of 23**	Alex Ferguson	10	QR3	2-0-1	QR2	1-0-1			310
2015–16	Southern Football League; Premier Division	7	46	21	13	12	76	53	+23	74	**8th of 24**	Andy Sandell	21	QR4	3–1–1	QR1	0–0–1			352
2016–17	Southern Football League; Premier Division	7	46	31	10	5	94	47	+47	103	**1st of 24**; Promoted	Andy Sandell	27	QR3	2–0–1	QR2	1–0–1			463
2017–18	National League South	6	42	15	9	18	63	70	-7	54	**13th of 22**	Andy Sandell	12	QR2	0–0–1	QR3	0–0–1			600
2018–19	National League South	6	42	16	7	19	57	64	-7	55	**13th of 22**	Nathaniel Jarvis	17	QR4	2–2–1	QR3	0–1–1			667
2019–20	National League South	6	35	10	12	13	39	45	-6	42	**14th of 22**	Scott Twine	6	R1	3–2–1	QR3	0–1–1			623
2020–21	National League South	6	14	4	4	6	13	22	-9	16	**16th of 21**	Bradley Ash	4	QR4	2–0–1	R2	0–0–1			518
2021–22	National League South	6	40	16	11	13	61	50	11	59	**7th of 21**	Ricky Aguiar	7	QR3	1–1–1	R2	0–0–1			610
2022–23	National League South	6	46	15	17	14	57	66	-9	62	**13th of 24**			R2	4–1–1	R3	1–0–1			616
2023–24	National League South	6	46	16	14	16	62	62	0	62	**12th of 24**			QR2	0–0–1	R4	1–1–1			691
2024–25	National League South	6	46	17	8	21	57	69	-12	59	**14th of 24**			QR3	1–1–1	R2	0–0–1			707
