= 1964–65 Hellenic Football League =

The 1964–65 Hellenic Football League season was the 12th in the history of the Hellenic Football League, a football competition in England.

== Premier Division ==
Hellenic Football League Premier Division
- Season: 1964–65
- Champions: Witney Town
- Relegated: Henley Town; Hungerford Town
- Matches: 306
- Goals: 1,408 (4.6 per match)

The Premier Division featured 16 clubs which competed in the division last season, along with two new clubs, promoted from Division One:

- Henley Town
- Kidlington

Also, Yiewsley reserves changed name to Hillingdon Borough reserves.

=== League table ===
Pos	Team	Pld	W	D	L	GF	GA	GR	Pts	Promotion or relegation
1	Witney Town	34	24	8	2	101	44	2.295	56	
2	Amersham Town	34	23	7	4	95	57	1.667	53	
3	Wallingford Town	34	21	5	8	92	61	1.508	47	
4	Thame United	34	19	6	9	99	71	1.394	44	
5	Didcot Town	34	19	4	11	95	68	1.397	42	
6	Oxford United 'A'	34	16	5	13	100	72	1.389	37	
7	Bicester Town	34	16	5	13	91	68	1.338	37	
8	Hillingdon Borough reserves	34	13	11	10	64	56	1.143	37	
9	Hazells	34	14	8	12	75	63	1.190	36	
10	Swindon Town 'A'	34	14	6	14	87	97	0.897	34	
11	Morris Motors	34	15	3	16	85	70	1.214	33	
12	Newbury Town	34	12	5	17	73	89	0.820	29	
13	Chipping Norton Town	34	13	1	20	66	85	0.776	27	
14	Abingdon Town	34	8	6	20	61	86	0.709	22	
15	Lambourn Sports	34	8	6	20	59	106	0.557	22	
16	Kidlington	34	9	3	22	54	87	0.621	21	
17	Henley Town	34	8	4	22	57	108	0.528	20	Relegated to Division One
18	Hungerford Town	34	5	5	24	54	120	0.450	15	Relegated to Division One

Source: nonleaguematters
Rules for classification: 1) points; 2) goal ratio; 3) number of goals scored.

== Division One ==
Hellenic Football League Division One
- Season: 1964–65
- Champions: Thatcham
- Promoted: Thatcham; Waddesdon
- Matches: 240
- Goals: 1,178 (4.91 per match)

The Division One featured 7 clubs which competed in the division last season, along with 9 new club:

- Stokenchurch, relegated from the Premier Division
- Wantage Town, relegated from the Premier Division
- Waddesdon
- Dunstable Town reserves, joined from the United Counties League
- Aylesbury Town Corinthians
- Watlington
- Smith’s Industries (Witney)
- Rivet Works (Aylesbury)
- Oxford Co-Op Sports

=== League table ===
Pos	Team	Pld	W	D	L	GF	GA	GR	Pts	Promotion or relegation
1	Thatcham	30	24	3	3	115	27	4.259	51	Promoted to the Premier Division
2	Waddesdon	30	20	6	4	96	40	2.400	46	Promoted to the Premier Division
3	Dunstable Town reserves	30	17	7	6	86	49	1.755	41	Transferred to the Metropolitan League
4	Princes Risborough Town	30	14	6	10	80	65	1.231	34	
5	Faringdon Town	30	15	4	11	78	76	1.026	34	
6	Marston United	30	16	1	13	68	53	1.283	33	
7	Aylesbury Town Corinthians	30	15	3	12	84	75	1.120	33	
8	Wantage Town	30	14	4	12	67	60	1.117	32	
9	Watlington	30	13	5	12	72	60	1.200	31	
10	Abingdon United	30	12	5	13	71	59	1.203	29	
11	Pressed Steel	30	13	3	14	68	75	0.907	29	
12	Smith’s Industries (Witney)	30	12	5	13	70	81	0.864	29	
13	Rivet Works (Aylesbury)	30	11	3	16	69	88	0.784	25	
14	Stokenchurch	30	6	3	21	66	126	0.524	15	
15	Oxford Co-Op Sports	30	4	2	24	51	125	0.408	10	Resigned from the league
16	A G R G Harwell	30	2	4	24	37	119	0.311	8	

Source: nonleaguematters
Rules for classification: 1) points; 2) goal ratio; 3) number of goals scored.
