= 1982–83 Hellenic Football League =

The 1982–83 Hellenic Football League season was the 30th in the history of the Hellenic Football League, a football competition in England.

== Premier Division ==
Hellenic Football League Premier Division
- Season: 1982–83
- Champions: Moreton Town
- Relegated: Shortwood United; Lambourn Sports
- Matches: 240
- Goals: 697 (2.9 per match)

The Premier Division featured twelve clubs which competed in the division last season, along with four new clubs.

- Clubs promoted from Division One:
  - Abingdon United
  - Lambourn Sports
- Clubs joined from the Gloucestershire County League:
  - Almondsbury Greenway
  - Shortwood United

=== League table ===
Pos	Team	Pld	W	D	L	GF	GA	GD	Pts	Promotion or relegation
1	Moreton Town	30	20	8	2	78	21	+57	48	
2	Almondsbury Greenway	30	18	4	8	70	37	+33	40	
3	Abingdon Town	30	15	9	6	59	33	+26	39	
4	Wallingford Town	30	17	4	9	52	42	+10	38	
5	Thame United	30	14	9	7	40	35	+5	37	
6	Didcot Town	30	14	7	9	42	33	+9	35	
7	Fairford Town	30	12	9	9	44	43	+1	33	
8	Wantage Town	30	9	13	8	41	33	+8	31	
9	Northwood	30	11	9	10	34	36	−2	31	
10	Bicester Town	30	12	6	12	35	34	+1	30	
11	Clanfield	30	10	6	14	41	44	−3	26	
12	Abingdon United	30	11	3	16	42	49	−7	25	
13	Maidenhead Town	30	10	3	17	36	65	−29	23	
14	Hazells	30	8	4	18	36	52	−16	20	
15	Shortwood United	30	6	3	21	30	65	−35	15	Relegated to Division One
16	Lambourn Sports	30	2	5	23	17	75	−58	9	Relegated to Division One

Source: fchd
Rules for classification: 1) points; 2) goal difference; 3) number of goals scored.

== Division One ==
Hellenic Football League Division One
- Season: 1982–83
- Champions: Rayners Lane
- Promoted: Rayners Lane; Supermarine
- Matches: 240
- Goals: 778 (3.24 per match)

Division One featured 13 clubs which competed in the division last season, along with three new clubs:

- Kidlington, relegated from the Premier Division
- Pegasus Juniors, joined from the Herefordshire Football League
- Supermarine, joined from the Wiltshire League

=== League table ===
Pos	Team	Pld	W	D	L	GF	GA	GD	Pts	Promotion or relegation
1	Rayners Lane	30	19	7	4	63	19	+44	45	Promoted to the Premier Division
2	Supermarine	30	17	11	2	50	21	+29	45	Promoted to the Premier Division
3	Pegasus Juniors	30	17	5	8	58	41	+17	39	
4	Cirencester Town	30	17	3	10	68	36	+32	37	
5	Pressed Steel	30	14	9	7	51	36	+15	37	
6	Milton Keynes Borough	30	14	4	12	61	43	+18	32	
7	Brackley Town	30	10	9	11	52	50	+2	29	Transferred to the United Counties League
8	Morris Motors	30	12	5	13	45	51	−6	29	
9	Lydney Town	30	10	8	12	39	50	−11	28	
10	Kidlington	30	10	8	12	29	49	−20	28	
11	Viking Sports	30	11	5	14	45	55	−10	27	
12	Worrall Hill	30	11	5	14	41	58	−17	27	
13	Badminton Picksons	30	10	5	15	55	61	−6	25	
14	Easington Sports	30	9	7	14	40	54	−14	25	
15	AFC Aldermaston	30	6	5	19	52	82	−30	17	
16	Dowty Staverton	30	3	4	23	29	72	−43	10	

Source: fchd
Rules for classification: 1) points; 2) goal difference; 3) number of goals scored.
