= 1967–68 Hellenic Football League =

The 1967–68 Hellenic Football League season was the 15th in the history of the Hellenic Football League, a football competition in England.

== Premier Division ==
Hellenic Football League Premier Division
- Season: 1967–68
- Champions: Hazells
- Relegated: Marston United; Princes Risborough Town
- Matches: 272
- Goals: 1,192 (4.38 per match)

The Premier Division featured 15 clubs which competed in the division last season, along with two new clubs, promoted from Division One:

- Abingdon Town
- Pinehurst

=== League table ===
Pos	Team	Pld	W	D	L	GF	GA	GR	Pts	Promotion or relegation
1	Hazells	32	21	5	6	94	50	1.880	47	
2	Witney Town	32	21	3	8	96	53	1.811	45	
3	Pinehurst	32	16	11	5	83	52	1.596	43	
4	Amersham Town	32	16	7	9	91	59	1.542	39	
5	Swindon Town 'A'	32	17	4	11	72	57	1.263	38	
6	Didcot Town	32	16	6	10	70	60	1.167	38	
7	Wallingford Town	32	15	7	10	80	71	1.127	37	
8	Bicester Town	32	12	10	10	73	66	1.106	34	
9	Morris Motors	32	14	5	13	82	65	1.262	33	
10	Thame United	32	13	7	12	83	65	1.277	33	
11	Banbury United reserves	32	13	7	12	57	54	1.056	33	Resigned from the league
12	Chipping Norton Town	32	14	5	13	59	84	0.702	33	
13	Waddesdon	32	10	7	15	59	75	0.787	27	
14	Newbury Town	32	9	1	22	48	102	0.471	19	
15	Abingdon Town	32	5	7	20	46	75	0.613	17	
16	Marston United	32	5	5	22	56	94	0.596	15	Relegated to Division One
17	Princes Risborough Town	32	5	3	24	43	110	0.391	13	Relegated to Division One

Source: nonleaguematters
Rules for classification: 1) points; 2) goal ratio; 3) number of goals scored.

== Division One ==
Hellenic Football League Division One
- Season: 1967–68
- Champions: Henley Town
- Promoted: Henley Town; Aston Clinton
- Matches: 240
- Goals: 1,036 (4.32 per match)

The Division One featured 13 clubs which competed in the division last season, along with 3 new clubs:

- Lambourn Sports, relegated from the Premier Division
- Thatcham, relegated from the Premier Division
- Clanfield

=== League table ===
Pos	Team	Pld	W	D	L	GF	GA	GR	Pts	Promotion or relegation
1	Henley Town	30	26	4	0	116	24	4.833	56	Promoted to the Premier Division
2	Aston Clinton	30	22	4	4	112	38	2.947	48	Promoted to the Premier Division
3	Stokenchurch	30	18	5	7	76	48	1.583	41	
4	Thatcham	30	16	6	8	72	44	1.636	38	
5	Buckingham Athletic	30	17	3	10	83	50	1.660	37	
6	Clanfield	30	17	2	11	66	53	1.245	36	
7	Abingdon United	30	15	6	9	63	54	1.167	36	
8	Kidlington	30	14	3	13	66	69	0.957	31	
9	Aylesbury Town Corinthians	30	11	4	15	63	90	0.700	26	
10	Wantage Town	30	9	7	14	46	56	0.821	25	
11	Watlington	30	9	7	14	49	62	0.790	25	
12	Pressed Steel	30	11	2	17	57	89	0.640	24	
13	Rivet Works (Aylesbury)	30	6	6	18	43	101	0.426	18	
14	Lambourn Sports	30	8	1	21	49	74	0.662	17	
15	Hungerford Town	30	4	3	23	43	98	0.439	11	
16	A G R G Harwell	30	3	5	22	32	86	0.372	11	

Source: nonleaguematters
Rules for classification: 1) points; 2) goal ratio; 3) number of goals scored.
