= 1971–72 Hellenic Football League =

The 1971–72 Hellenic Football League season was the 19th in the history of the Hellenic Football League, a football competition in England.

== Premier Division ==
Hellenic Football League Premier Division
- Season: 1971–72
- Champions: Witney Town
- Relegated: Buckingham Athletic; Cirencester Town
- Matches: 272
- Goals: 886 (3.26 per match)

The Premier Division featured 15 clubs which competed in the division last season, along with two new clubs, promoted from Division One:

- Hungerford Town
- Pressed Steel

=== League table ===
Pos	Team	Pld	W	D	L	GF	GA	GR	Pts	Promotion or relegation
1	Witney Town	32	23	5	4	78	27	2.889	51	
2	Abingdon Town	32	19	8	5	69	29	2.379	46	
3	Clanfield	32	19	8	5	85	45	1.889	46	
4	Pinehurst	32	15	11	6	51	32	1.594	41	
5	Chippenham Town	32	15	7	10	54	49	1.102	37	
6	Moreton Town	32	14	7	11	66	52	1.269	35	
7	Didcot Town	32	12	10	10	44	39	1.128	34	
8	Wallingford Town	32	12	10	10	41	39	1.051	34	
9	Pressed Steel	32	12	6	14	41	43	0.953	30	
10	Newbury Town	32	10	8	14	40	51	0.784	28	
11	Thame United	32	11	5	16	47	63	0.746	27	
12	Wantage Town	32	12	1	19	52	66	0.788	25	
13	Bicester Town	32	9	6	17	47	51	0.922	24	
14	Morris Motors	32	10	4	18	41	64	0.641	24	
15	Hungerford Town	32	8	6	18	43	60	0.717	22	
16	Cirencester Town	32	9	4	19	50	82	0.610	22	Relegated to Division One
17	Buckingham Athletic	32	4	10	18	37	94	0.394	18	Relegated to Division One

Source: nonleaguematters
Rules for classification: 1) points; 2) goal ratio; 3) number of goals scored.

== Division One A ==
Hellenic Football League Division One A
- Season: 1971–72
- Champions: Fairford Town
- Promoted: Fairford Town
- Relegated: Abingdon United; Marston United; Easington Sports

The Division One A featured 8 clubs which competed in the Division One last season, along with 5 new clubs:

- Swindon Town 'A', relegated from the Premier Division
- Burnham, joined from the Reading Combination
- Easington Sports, joined from the Oxfordshire Senior League
- Long Wittenham
- MG Athletic

=== League table ===
Pos	Team	Pld	W	D	L	GF	GA	GR	Pts	Promotion or relegation
1	Fairford Town	24	16	5	3	67	28	2.393	37	Promoted to the Premier Division
2	Burnham	24	15	4	5	68	26	2.615	34	
3	Ernest Turner Sports	24	15	4	5	66	35	1.886	34	
4	Thatcham	24	11	8	5	59	37	1.595	30	
5	Long Wittenham	24	13	4	7	51	39	1.308	30	
6	Swindon Town 'A'	24	12	4	8	64	39	1.641	28	
7	Hazells	24	10	5	9	36	30	1.200	25	
8	Abingdon United	24	9	5	10	43	45	0.956	23	Relegated to Division Two
9	MG Athletic	24	9	4	11	40	41	0.976	22	
10	Marston United	24	7	7	10	41	53	0.774	21	Relegated to Division Two
11	Easington Sports	24	6	8	10	40	59	0.678	20	Relegated to Division Two
12	Lambourn Sports	24	2	1	21	28	83	0.337	5	Resigned from the league
13	Aylesbury Town Corinthians	24	1	1	22	21	109	0.193	3	Resigned from the league

Source: nonleaguematters
Rules for classification: 1) points; 2) goal ratio; 3) number of goals scored.

== Division One B ==
Hellenic Football League Division One B
- Season: 1971–72
- Champions: Chipping Norton Town
- Promoted: Chipping Norton Town
- Relegated: Watlington; Maidenhead Social; Aston Clinton; Stokenchurch; A G R G Harwell

The Division One B featured 10 clubs which competed in the Division One last season, along with 4 new clubs:

- Amersham Town, relegated from the Premier Division
- Garsington
- Maidenhead Social
- Oxford University Press

=== League table ===
Pos	Team	Pld	W	D	L	GF	GA	GR	Pts	Promotion or relegation
1	Chipping Norton Town	26	17	5	4	71	34	2.088	39	Promoted to the Premier Division
2	Rivet Works (Aylesbury)	26	16	6	4	82	29	2.828	38	
3	Waddesdon	26	17	4	5	72	31	2.323	38	
4	Princes Risborough Town	26	13	6	7	59	36	1.639	32	
5	Amersham Town	26	11	10	5	60	37	1.622	32	Transferred to the Spartan League
6	Kidlington	26	13	5	8	50	35	1.429	31	
7	Garsington	26	12	2	12	62	66	0.939	26	
8	Oxford University Press	26	10	5	11	45	56	0.804	25	
9	Watlington	26	8	6	12	26	41	0.634	22	Relegated to Division Two
10	AC Delco	26	6	8	12	42	55	0.764	20	
11	Maidenhead Social	26	8	4	14	45	60	0.750	20	Relegated to Division Two
12	Aston Clinton	26	5	8	13	26	46	0.565	18	Relegated to Division Two
13	Stokenchurch	26	6	2	18	35	71	0.493	14	Relegated to Division Two
14	A G R G Harwell	26	3	3	20	23	101	0.228	9	Relegated to Division Two

Source: nonleaguematters
Rules for classification: 1) points; 2) goal ratio; 3) number of goals scored.
