= 1968–69 Hellenic Football League =

The 1968–69 Hellenic Football League season was the 16th in the history of the Hellenic Football League, a football competition in England.

== Premier Division ==
Hellenic Football League Premier Division
- Season: 1968–69
- Champions: Wallingford Town
- Relegated: Aston Clinton; Waddesdon
- Matches: 272
- Goals: 1,112 (4.09 per match)

The Premier Division featured 14 clubs which competed in the division last season, along with three new clubs:

- Aston Clinton, promoted from Division One
- Chippenham Town, joined from the Wiltshire League
- Henley Town, promoted from Division One

=== League table ===
Pos	Team	Pld	W	D	L	GF	GA	GR	Pts	Promotion or relegation
1	Wallingford Town	32	23	2	7	105	36	2.917	48	
2	Pinehurst	32	23	0	9	113	48	2.354	46	
3	Morris Motors	32	21	4	7	92	43	2.140	46	
4	Thame United	32	19	6	7	82	49	1.673	44	
5	Chippenham Town	32	17	5	10	84	50	1.680	39	
6	Witney Town	32	15	9	8	63	47	1.340	39	
7	Abingdon Town	32	12	11	9	49	46	1.065	35	
8	Newbury Town	32	14	5	13	55	49	1.122	33	
9	Didcot Town	32	13	7	12	57	60	0.950	33	
10	Amersham Town	32	11	7	14	64	61	1.049	29	
11	Swindon Town 'A'	32	11	7	14	59	89	0.663	29	
12	Bicester Town	32	9	8	15	62	73	0.849	26	
13	Hazells	32	9	7	16	52	60	0.867	25	
14	Henley Town	32	9	7	16	44	63	0.698	25	
15	Chipping Norton Town	32	9	6	17	59	73	0.808	24	
16	Aston Clinton	32	4	6	22	39	113	0.345	14	Relegated to Division One
17	Waddesdon	32	2	5	25	33	152	0.217	9	Relegated to Division One

Source: nonleaguematters
Rules for classification: 1) points; 2) goal ratio; 3) number of goals scored.

== Division One ==
Hellenic Football League Division One
- Season: 1968–69
- Champions: Oxford City reserves
- Promoted: Oxford City reserves Buckingham Athletic
- Matches: 306
- Goals: 1,296 (4.24 per match)

The Division One featured 14 clubs which competed in the division last season, along with 4 new clubs:

- Marston United, relegated from the Premier Division
- Princes Risborough Town, relegated from the Premier Division
- Ernest Turner Sports
- Oxford City reserves

=== League table ===
Pos	Team	Pld	W	D	L	GF	GA	GR	Pts	Promotion or relegation
1	Oxford City reserves	34	24	9	1	125	26	4.808	57	Promoted to the Premier Division
2	Buckingham Athletic	34	24	5	5	97	37	2.622	53	Promoted to the Premier Division
3	Clanfield	34	23	5	6	106	52	2.038	51	
4	Ernest Turner Sports	34	23	3	8	85	45	1.889	49	
5	Abingdon United	34	16	8	10	81	72	1.125	40	
6	Wantage Town	34	16	7	11	69	56	1.232	39	
7	Marston United	34	13	12	9	66	54	1.222	38	
8	Thatcham	34	15	8	11	80	68	1.176	38	
9	Pressed Steel	34	14	6	14	77	77	1.000	34	
10	Stokenchurch	34	12	9	13	73	58	1.259	33	
11	Rivet Works (Aylesbury)	34	13	5	16	53	64	0.828	31	
12	Lambourn Sports	34	11	8	15	77	88	0.875	30	
13	Kidlington	34	11	6	17	72	84	0.857	28	
14	Hungerford Town	34	8	6	20	45	84	0.536	22	
15	A G R G Harwell	34	9	3	22	64	123	0.520	21	
16	Watlington	34	7	5	22	42	89	0.472	19	
17	Princes Risborough Town	34	6	6	22	50	96	0.521	18	
18	Aylesbury Town Corinthians	34	3	5	26	34	123	0.276	11	

Source: nonleaguematters
Rules for classification: 1) points; 2) goal ratio; 3) number of goals scored.
