= 1970–71 Hellenic Football League =

The 1970–71 Hellenic Football League season was the 18th in the history of the Hellenic Football League, a football competition in England.

== Premier Division ==
Hellenic Football League Premier Division
- Season: 1970–71
- Champions: Witney Town
- Relegated: Amersham Town; Swindon Town 'A'
- Matches: 306
- Goals: 1,047 (3.42 per match)

The Premier Division featured 15 clubs which competed in the division last season, along with three new clubs:

- Clanfield, promoted from Division One
- Moreton Town, joined from the Cheltenham League
- Wantage Town, promoted from Division One

=== League table ===
| Pos | Team | Pld | W | D | L | GF | GA | GR | Pts | Promotion or relegation |
|---|---|---|---|---|---|---|---|---|---|---|
| 1 | Witney Town | 34 | 26 | 6 | 2 | 105 | 16 | 6.563 | 58 | |
| 2 | Abingdon Town | 34 | 20 | 12 | 2 | 74 | 31 | 2.387 | 52 | |
| 3 | Wallingford Town | 34 | 21 | 6 | 7 | 72 | 37 | 1.946 | 48 | |
| 4 | Chippenham Town | 34 | 21 | 6 | 7 | 72 | 42 | 1.714 | 48 | |
| 5 | Clanfield | 34 | 18 | 9 | 7 | 87 | 49 | 1.776 | 45 | |
| 6 | Bicester Town | 34 | 13 | 13 | 8 | 67 | 48 | 1.396 | 39 | |
| 7 | Thame United | 34 | 14 | 7 | 13 | 75 | 57 | 1.316 | 35 | |
| 8 | Didcot Town | 34 | 12 | 11 | 11 | 48 | 51 | 0.941 | 35 | |
| 9 | Moreton Town | 34 | 12 | 10 | 12 | 55 | 54 | 1.019 | 34 | |
| 10 | Pinehurst | 34 | 10 | 12 | 12 | 54 | 59 | 0.915 | 32 | |
| 11 | Wantage Town | 34 | 11 | 8 | 15 | 40 | 56 | 0.714 | 30 | |
| 12 | Cirencester Town | 34 | 12 | 5 | 17 | 54 | 57 | 0.947 | 29 | |
| 13 | Buckingham Athletic | 34 | 8 | 13 | 13 | 49 | 65 | 0.754 | 29 | |
| 14 | Morris Motors | 34 | 8 | 11 | 15 | 45 | 60 | 0.750 | 27 | |
| 15 | Newbury Town | 34 | 7 | 8 | 19 | 49 | 83 | 0.590 | 22 | |
| 16 | Henley Town | 34 | 7 | 8 | 19 | 44 | 82 | 0.537 | 22 | Resigned from the league |
| 17 | Swindon Town 'A' | 34 | 4 | 7 | 23 | 30 | 85 | 0.353 | 15 | Relegated to Division One A |
| 18 | Amersham Town | 34 | 3 | 6 | 25 | 27 | 115 | 0.235 | 12 | Relegated to Division One B |

Source: nonleaguematters
Rules for classification: 1) points; 2) goal ratio; 3) number of goals scored.

== Division One ==
Hellenic Football League Division One
- Season: 1970–71
- Champions: Hungerford Town
- Promoted: Hungerford Town; Pressed Steel
- Matches: 380
- Goals: 1,509 (3.97 per match)

The Division One featured 17 clubs which competed in the division last season, along with 3 new clubs:

- Chipping Norton Town, relegated from the Premier Division
- Hazells, relegated from the Premier Division
- Fairford Town, joined from the Swindon & District League

=== League table ===
| Pos | Team | Pld | W | D | L | GF | GA | GR | Pts | Promotion or relegation |
|---|---|---|---|---|---|---|---|---|---|---|
| 1 | Hungerford Town | 38 | 26 | 8 | 4 | 130 | 37 | 3.514 | 60 | Promoted to the Premier Division |
| 2 | Pressed Steel | 38 | 25 | 9 | 4 | 111 | 33 | 3.364 | 59 | Promoted to the Premier Division |
| 3 | Fairford Town | 38 | 25 | 9 | 4 | 99 | 50 | 1.980 | 59 | Placed to Division One A |
| 4 | Chipping Norton Town | 38 | 23 | 7 | 8 | 98 | 45 | 2.178 | 53 | Placed to Division One B |
| 5 | Ernest Turner Sports | 38 | 24 | 4 | 10 | 125 | 53 | 2.358 | 52 | Placed to Division One A |
| 6 | Stokenchurch | 38 | 24 | 3 | 11 | 86 | 52 | 1.654 | 51 | Placed to Division One B |
| 7 | Abingdon United | 38 | 19 | 5 | 14 | 78 | 65 | 1.200 | 43 | Placed to Division One A |
| 8 | Waddesdon | 38 | 17 | 8 | 13 | 75 | 71 | 1.056 | 42 | Placed to Division One B |
| 9 | Marston United | 38 | 15 | 10 | 13 | 75 | 57 | 1.316 | 40 | Placed to Division One A |
| 10 | Kidlington | 38 | 17 | 6 | 15 | 87 | 83 | 1.048 | 40 | Placed to Division One B |
| 11 | AC Delco | 38 | 16 | 6 | 16 | 68 | 80 | 0.850 | 38 | Placed to Division One B |
| 12 | Princes Risborough Town | 38 | 13 | 9 | 16 | 61 | 63 | 0.968 | 35 | Placed to Division One B |
| 13 | Thatcham | 38 | 13 | 9 | 16 | 71 | 75 | 0.947 | 35 | Placed to Division One A |
| 14 | Rivet Works (Aylesbury) | 38 | 13 | 7 | 18 | 63 | 72 | 0.875 | 33 | Placed to Division One B |
| 15 | Hazells | 38 | 11 | 7 | 20 | 67 | 86 | 0.779 | 29 | Placed to Division One A |
| 16 | Watlington | 38 | 11 | 7 | 20 | 49 | 73 | 0.671 | 29 | Placed to Division One B |
| 17 | Lambourn Sports | 38 | 8 | 5 | 25 | 55 | 109 | 0.505 | 21 | Placed to Division One A |
| 18 | Aston Clinton | 38 | 6 | 6 | 26 | 42 | 116 | 0.362 | 18 | Placed to Division One B |
| 19 | Aylesbury Town Corinthians | 38 | 4 | 4 | 30 | 32 | 156 | 0.205 | 12 | Placed to Division One A |
| 20 | A G R G Harwell | 38 | 4 | 3 | 31 | 37 | 133 | 0.278 | 11 | Placed to Division One B |

Source: nonleaguematters
Rules for classification: 1) points; 2) goal ratio; 3) number of goals scored.
