= 1966–67 Hellenic Football League =

The 1966–67 Hellenic Football League season was the 14th in the history of the Hellenic Football League, a football competition in England.

== Premier Division ==
Hellenic Football League Premier Division
- Season: 1966–67
- Champions: Witney Town
- Relegated: Lambourn Sports; Thatcham
- Matches: 306
- Goals: 1,313 (4.29 per match)

The Premier Division featured 15 clubs which competed in the division last season, along with three new clubs:

- Banbury United reserves
- Marston United, promoted from Division One
- Princes Risborough Town, promoted from Division One

=== League table ===
Pos	Team	Pld	W	D	L	GF	GA	GR	Pts	Promotion or relegation
1	Witney Town	34	24	4	6	102	39	2.615	52	
2	Hazells	34	25	2	7	109	55	1.982	52	
3	Morris Motors	34	23	3	8	94	51	1.843	49	
4	Banbury United reserves	34	24	0	10	83	58	1.431	48	
5	Didcot Town	34	18	6	10	84	65	1.292	42	
6	Wallingford Town	34	20	1	13	78	56	1.393	41	
7	Bicester Town	34	16	4	14	83	68	1.221	36	
8	Swindon Town 'A'	34	14	8	12	69	64	1.078	36	
9	Thame United	34	13	9	12	73	62	1.177	35	
10	Princes Risborough Town	34	10	11	13	70	65	1.077	31	
11	Oxford United 'A'	34	12	6	16	72	103	0.699	30	Resigned from the league
12	Amersham Town	34	13	3	18	75	71	1.056	29	
13	Chipping Norton Town	34	13	3	18	78	98	0.796	29	
14	Newbury Town	34	11	5	18	49	65	0.754	27	
15	Waddesdon	34	8	6	20	47	93	0.505	22	
16	Marston United	34	7	7	20	51	91	0.560	21	
17	Lambourn Sports	34	7	4	23	54	117	0.462	18	Relegated to Division One
18	Thatcham	34	5	4	25	42	92	0.457	14	Relegated to Division One

Source: nonleaguematters
Rules for classification: 1) points; 2) goal ratio; 3) number of goals scored.

== Division One ==
Hellenic Football League Division One
- Season: 1966–67
- Champions: Pinehurst
- Promoted: Pinehurst; Abingdon Town
- Matches: 240
- Goals: 1,088 (4.53 per match)

The Division One featured 13 clubs which competed in the division last season, along with 3 new club:

- Kidlington, relegated from the Premier Division
- Abingdon Town, relegated from the Premier Division
- Pinehurst

=== League table ===
Pos	Team	Pld	W	D	L	GF	GA	GR	Pts	Promotion or relegation
1	Pinehurst	30	26	2	2	160	35	4.571	54	Promoted to the Premier Division
2	Abingdon Town	30	20	5	5	84	36	2.333	45	Promoted to the Premier Division
3	Aston Clinton	30	18	6	6	76	43	1.767	42	
4	Abingdon United	30	18	2	10	86	42	2.048	38	
5	Hungerford Town	30	16	5	9	96	64	1.500	37	
6	Henley Town	30	16	5	9	67	56	1.196	37	
7	Buckingham Athletic	30	14	5	11	70	71	0.986	33	
8	Pressed Steel	30	13	5	12	68	81	0.840	31	
9	Smith’s Industries (Witney)	30	11	5	14	60	84	0.714	27	Resigned from the league
10	Kidlington	30	9	8	13	51	62	0.823	26	
11	Wantage Town	30	12	2	16	49	70	0.700	26	
12	Stokenchurch	30	8	6	16	60	99	0.606	22	
13	Watlington	30	8	6	16	41	81	0.506	22	
14	Aylesbury Town Corinthians	30	6	6	18	56	82	0.683	18	
15	A G R G Harwell	30	2	8	20	24	72	0.333	12	
16	Rivet Works (Aylesbury)	30	2	6	22	40	110	0.364	10	

Source: nonleaguematters
Rules for classification: 1) points; 2) goal ratio; 3) number of goals scored.
