= 1969–70 Hellenic Football League =

The 1969–70 Hellenic Football League season was the 17th in the history of the Hellenic Football League, a football competition in England.

== Premier Division ==
Hellenic Football League Premier Division
- Season: 1969–70
- Champions: Thame United
- Relegated: Chipping Norton Town; Hazells
- Matches: 306
- Goals: 967 (3.16 per match)

The Premier Division featured 15 clubs which competed in the division last season, along with three new clubs:

- Buckingham Athletic, promoted from Division One
- Cirencester Town, joined from the Gloucestershire County League
- Oxford City reserves, promoted from Division One

=== League table ===
Pos	Team	Pld	W	D	L	GF	GA	GR	Pts	Promotion or relegation
1	Thame United	34	29	2	3	94	26	3.615	60	
2	Witney Town	34	27	4	3	96	32	3.000	58	
3	Abingdon Town	34	18	8	8	59	33	1.788	44	
4	Cirencester Town	34	18	6	10	57	42	1.357	42	
5	Wallingford Town	34	18	5	11	58	47	1.234	41	
6	Didcot Town	34	16	5	13	54	42	1.286	37	
7	Buckingham Athletic	34	12	13	9	45	43	1.047	37	
8	Bicester Town	34	12	10	12	57	48	1.188	34	
9	Chippenham Town	34	14	6	14	63	66	0.955	34	
10	Newbury Town	34	14	6	14	41	50	0.820	34	
11	Pinehurst	34	11	11	12	54	56	0.964	33	
12	Morris Motors	34	11	8	15	43	49	0.878	30	
13	Swindon Town 'A'	34	10	7	17	45	57	0.789	27	
14	Oxford City reserves	34	11	4	19	48	63	0.762	26	Resigned from the league
15	Amersham Town	34	10	4	20	42	70	0.600	24	
16	Henley Town	34	8	7	19	39	64	0.609	23	
17	Chipping Norton Town	34	4	6	24	40	93	0.430	14	Relegated to Division One
18	Hazells	34	4	6	24	32	86	0.372	14	Relegated to Division One

Source: nonleaguematters
Rules for classification: 1) points; 2) goal ratio; 3) number of goals scored.

== Division One ==
Hellenic Football League Division One
- Season: 1969–70
- Champions: Clanfield
- Promoted: Clanfield; Wantage Town
- Matches: 342
- Goals: 1,304 (3.81 per match)

The Division One featured 16 clubs which competed in the division last season, along with 3 new clubs:

- Aston Clinton, relegated from the Premier Division
- Waddesdon, relegated from the Premier Division
- AC Delco, joined from the South Midlands League Premier Division

=== League table ===
Pos	Team	Pld	W	D	L	GF	GA	GR	Pts	Promotion or relegation
1	Clanfield	36	30	3	3	120	21	5.714	63	Promoted to the Premier Division
2	Wantage Town	36	24	7	5	64	32	2.000	55	Promoted to the Premier Division
3	Ernest Turner Sports	36	25	3	8	94	53	1.774	53	
4	Princes Risborough Town	36	22	5	9	87	50	1.740	49	
5	Rivet Works (Aylesbury)	36	19	4	13	77	55	1.400	42	
6	Waddesdon	36	15	10	11	67	51	1.314	40	
7	Thatcham	36	16	7	13	77	61	1.262	39	
8	Watlington	36	15	9	12	61	50	1.220	39	
9	Stokenchurch	36	16	7	13	80	68	1.176	39	
10	Kidlington	36	16	7	13	67	63	1.063	39	
11	AC Delco	36	17	5	14	57	58	0.983	39	
12	Abingdon United	36	11	8	17	62	68	0.912	30	
13	Hungerford Town	36	11	7	18	55	76	0.724	29	
14	Pressed Steel	36	10	6	20	61	80	0.763	26	
15	Marston United	36	9	5	22	63	107	0.589	23	
16	A G R G Harwell	36	7	8	21	58	115	0.504	22	
17	Aylesbury Town Corinthians	36	7	6	23	54	95	0.568	20	
18	Lambourn Sports	36	6	7	23	58	95	0.611	19	
19	Aston Clinton	36	6	6	24	42	106	0.396	18	

Source: nonleaguematters
Rules for classification: 1) points; 2) goal ratio; 3) number of goals scored.
