= 1965–66 Hellenic Football League =

The 1965–66 Hellenic Football League season was the 13th in the history of the Hellenic Football League, a football competition in England.

== Premier Division ==
Hellenic Football League Premier Division
- Season: 1965–66
- Champions: Witney Town
- Relegated: Abingdon Town; Kidlington
- Matches: 306
- Goals: 1,492 (4.88 per match)

The Premier Division featured 16 clubs which competed in the division last season, along with two new clubs, promoted from Division One:

- Thatcham
- Waddesdon

=== League table ===
Pos	Team	Pld	W	D	L	GF	GA	GR	Pts	Promotion or relegation
1	Witney Town	34	25	4	5	134	32	4.188	54	
2	Amersham Town	34	20	10	4	104	54	1.926	50	
3	Wallingford Town	34	22	4	8	112	58	1.931	48	
4	Thame United	34	20	3	11	122	67	1.821	43	
5	Hillingdon Borough reserves	34	20	2	12	105	66	1.591	42	Transferred to the Metropolitan League
6	Didcot Town	34	16	8	10	77	57	1.351	40	
7	Hazells	34	15	9	10	88	75	1.173	39	
8	Chipping Norton Town	34	15	8	11	76	62	1.226	38	
9	Swindon Town 'A'	34	16	3	15	92	78	1.179	35	
10	Bicester Town	34	15	4	15	86	75	1.147	34	
11	Newbury Town	34	15	2	17	70	74	0.946	32	
12	Oxford United 'A'	34	12	7	15	64	72	0.889	31	
13	Waddesdon	34	8	8	18	68	103	0.660	24	
14	Thatcham	34	9	6	19	63	100	0.630	24	
15	Lambourn Sports	34	10	4	20	70	168	0.417	24	
16	Morris Motors	34	9	5	20	58	100	0.580	23	
17	Kidlington	34	8	2	24	54	116	0.466	18	Relegated to Division One
18	Abingdon Town	34	4	5	25	49	135	0.363	13	Relegated to Division One

Source: nonleaguematters
Rules for classification: 1) points; 2) goal ratio; 3) number of goals scored.

== Division One ==
Hellenic Football League Division One
- Season: 1965–66
- Champions: Princes Risborough Town
- Promoted: Princes Risborough Town; Marston United
- Matches: 240
- Goals: 1,161 (4.84 per match)

The Division One featured 12 clubs which competed in the division last season, along with 4 new club:

- Henley Town, relegated from the Premier Division
- Hungerford Town, relegated from the Premier Division
- Aston Clinton
- Buckingham Athletic

=== League table ===
Pos	Team	Pld	W	D	L	GF	GA	GR	Pts	Promotion or relegation
1	Princes Risborough Town	30	24	3	3	92	26	3.538	51	Promoted to the Premier Division
2	Marston United	30	23	5	2	82	40	2.050	51	Promoted to the Premier Division
3	Henley Town	30	22	3	5	110	41	2.683	47	
4	Abingdon United	30	22	2	6	111	33	3.364	46	
5	Aston Clinton	30	15	8	7	85	68	1.250	38	
6	Watlington	30	15	3	12	83	64	1.297	33	
7	Smith’s Industries (Witney)	30	13	7	10	75	74	1.014	33	
8	Wantage Town	30	15	2	13	67	69	0.971	32	
9	Buckingham Athletic	30	13	2	15	66	67	0.985	28	
10	Hungerford Town	30	11	5	14	76	73	1.041	27	
11	Aylesbury Town Corinthians	30	10	0	20	64	94	0.681	20	
12	Rivet Works (Aylesbury)	30	7	5	18	63	90	0.700	19	
13	Stokenchurch	30	5	5	20	59	104	0.567	15	
14	A G R G Harwell	30	7	1	22	49	109	0.450	15	
15	Faringdon Town	30	5	3	22	41	112	0.366	13	Resigned from the league
16	Prosper Cell Rovers	30	3	6	21	38	97	0.392	12	

Source: nonleaguematters
Rules for classification: 1) points; 2) goal ratio; 3) number of goals scored.
