= 1982–83 Athenian League =

Athenian League
- Season: 1982–83
- Champions: Newbury Town
- Promoted: Newbury Town; Grays Athletic
- Relegated: None

The 1982–83 Athenian League season was the 60th in the history of Athenian League. The league consisted of 20 teams.

== Clubs ==
The league joined 4 new teams:

- Camberley Town, relegated from Isthmian League Division Two
- Newbury Town, from Hellenic League Premier Division
- Thatcham Town, from Hellenic League Division One
- Flackwell Heath, from Hellenic League Premier Division

== League table ==
| Pos | Team | Pld | W | D | L | GF | GA | GR | Pts | Promotion or relegation |
|---|---|---|---|---|---|---|---|---|---|---|
| 1 | Newbury Town (C, P) | 38 | 27 | 5 | 6 | 97 | 42 | 2.310 | 59 | Promotion to Isthmian League Division Two |
| 2 | Grays Athletic (P) | 38 | 25 | 3 | 10 | 79 | 27 | 2.926 | 53 | Promotion to Isthmian League Division Two |
| 3 | Redhill | 38 | 22 | 9 | 7 | 68 | 38 | 1.789 | 53 | |
| 4 | Marlow | 38 | 21 | 8 | 9 | 67 | 40 | 1.675 | 50 | |
| 5 | Chalfont St.Peter | 38 | 18 | 12 | 8 | 64 | 40 | 1.600 | 48 | |
| 6 | Burnham | 38 | 17 | 13 | 8 | 80 | 46 | 1.739 | 47 | |
| 7 | Banstead Athletic | 38 | 16 | 10 | 12 | 62 | 50 | 1.240 | 42 | |
| 8 | Whyteleafe | 38 | 15 | 12 | 11 | 46 | 39 | 1.179 | 42 | |
| 9 | Harefield United | 38 | 15 | 12 | 11 | 54 | 55 | 0.982 | 42 | |
| 10 | Kingsbury Town | 38 | 16 | 10 | 12 | 56 | 40 | 1.400 | 41 (Note: Kingsbury Town deducted 1 point.) | |
| 11 | Hoddesdon Town | 38 | 15 | 10 | 13 | 58 | 54 | 1.074 | 40 | |
| 12 | Flackwell Heath | 38 | 11 | 13 | 14 | 45 | 50 | 0.900 | 35 | |
| 13 | Horley Town | 38 | 10 | 13 | 15 | 45 | 58 | 0.776 | 33 | |
| 14 | Edgware | 38 | 12 | 7 | 19 | 48 | 62 | 0.774 | 31 | |
| 15 | Chertsey Town | 38 | 10 | 10 | 18 | 61 | 88 | 0.693 | 30 | |
| 16 | Ruislip Manor | 38 | 12 | 4 | 22 | 55 | 70 | 0.786 | 28 | |
| 17 | Fleet Town | 38 | 8 | 10 | 20 | 38 | 65 | 0.585 | 25 (Note: Fleet Town deducted 1 point.) | |
| 18 | Thatcham Town | 38 | 8 | 6 | 24 | 30 | 85 | 0.353 | 22 | |
| 19 | Haringey Borough | 38 | 5 | 9 | 24 | 27 | 82 | 0.329 | 19 | |
| 20 | Camberley Town | 38 | 4 | 10 | 24 | 31 | 80 | 0.388 | 16 (Note: Camberley Town deducted 2 points.) | |

Source: fchd.info
Rules for classification: 1) points; 2) goal difference; 3) number of goals scored.
(C) Champions; (P) Promoted

=== Stadia and locations ===
Locations of the Athenian League clubs
Greater London Athenian League football clubs

| Club | Stadium |
|---|---|
| Banstead Athletic | Merland Rise |
| Burnham | The 1878 Stadium |
| Camberley Town | Kroomer Park |
| Chalfont St Peter | Mill Meadow |
| Chertsey Town | Alwyns Lane |
| Edgware | White Lion |
| Flackwell Heath | Wilks Park |
| Fleet Town | Calthorpe Park |
| Grays Athletic | New Recreation Ground |
| Harefield United | Preston Park |
| Haringey Borough | Coles Park |
| Hoddesdon Town | Lowfield |
| Horley Town | The New Defence |
| Kingsbury Town | Avenue Park |
| Newbury Town | Town Ground |
| Redhill | Kiln Brow |
| Ruislip Manor | Grosvenor Vale |
| Thatcham Town | Waterside Park |
| Marlow | Alfred Davis Memorial Ground |
| Whyteleafe | Church Road |
