= 1977–78 Athenian League =

Athenian League
- Season: 1977–78
- Champions: Billericay Town
- Promoted: None
- Relegated: None

The 1977–78 Athenian League season was the 55th in the history of Athenian League. The league consisted of 18 teams.

== Clubs ==
The league featured 8 clubs which competed in the previous season Division One and 10 new teams:

- 7 promoted from last season's Division Two:
  - Chalfont St.Peter (5th)
  - Harefield United (6th)
  - Uxbridge (7th)
  - Edgware (9th)
  - Kingsbury Town (11th)
  - Windsor & Eton (13th)
  - Chertsey Town (15th)
- 3 joined the division:
  - Billericay Town, from Essex Senior League
  - Hoddesdon Town, from London Spartan League Division One
  - Burnham, from Hellenic League Premier Division

== League table ==
Pos	Team	Pld	W	D	L	GF	GA	GR	Pts	Promotion or relegation
1	Billericay Town (C)	34	23	7	4	80	21	3.810	53	
2	Leyton-Wingate	34	21	8	5	73	42	1.738	50	
3	Grays Athletic	34	20	8	6	72	31	2.323	48	
4	Burnham	34	20	8	6	69	33	2.091	48	
5	Chalfont St.Peter	34	20	5	9	59	31	1.903	45	
6	Edgware	34	14	14	6	54	29	1.862	42	
7	Alton Town	34	13	12	9	50	33	1.515	38	
8	Marlow	34	14	7	13	61	59	1.034	35	
9	Windsor & Eton	34	13	8	13	47	44	1.068	34	
10	Harefield United	34	10	13	11	37	50	0.740	33	
11	Haringey Borough	34	9	12	13	49	48	1.021	30	
12	Uxbridge	34	10	9	15	30	37	0.811	29	
13	Hoddesdon Town	34	8	12	14	41	54	0.759	28	
14	Ruislip Manor	34	10	8	16	44	58	0.759	28	
15	Chertsey Town	34	8	8	18	47	77	0.610	24	
16	Kingsbury Town	34	6	9	19	33	60	0.550	21	Left to join London Spartan League Senior Division
17	Erith & Belvedere	34	6	6	22	34	82	0.415	18	Left to join Kent League
18	Redhill	34	2	4	28	19	110	0.173	8	

Source: fchd.info
Rules for classification: 1) points; 2) goal difference; 3) number of goals scored.
(C) Champions

=== Stadia and locations ===
Locations of the Athenian League clubs
Greater London Athenian League football clubs

Club	Stadium
Alton Town	Anstey Park
Billericay Town	New Lodge
Burnham	The 1878 Stadium
Chalfont St Peter	Mill Meadow
Chertsey Town	Alwyns Lane
Edgware	White Lion
Erith & Belvedere	Park View
Grays Athletic	New Recreation Ground
Harefield United	Preston Park
Haringey Borough	Coles Park
Hoddesdon Town	Lowfield
Kingsbury Town	Avenue Park
Leyton-Wingate	Wadham Lodge
Redhill	Kiln Brow
Ruislip Manor	Grosvenor Vale
Marlow	Alfred Davis Memorial Ground
Uxbridge	Honeycroft
Windsor & Eton	Stag Meadow
