= Dave Howitt =

English footballer

Personal information
- Full name: David John Howitt
- Date of birth: 4 August 1952 (age 74)
- Place of birth: Birmingham, England
- Height: 5 ft 11 in (1.80 m)
- Position: Full back

Youth career
- 1968–1970: Birmingham City

Senior career*
Years	Team	Apps	(Gls)
1970–1973	Birmingham City	2	(0)
1973–1974	Bury	20	(4)
1974–1975	Workington	35	(1)
1975–1981	Aldershot	137	(2)
1981–1983	Milton Keynes City		
1983–198?	Milton Keynes Borough		
- Newport Pagnell Town

Managerial career
- 1981–1983: Milton Keynes City (player-manager)
- * Club domestic league appearances and goals

David John Howitt (born 4 August 1952) is an English former professional footballer who made 194 appearances in the Football League playing for Birmingham City, Bury, Workington and Aldershot.

Howitt was born in Birmingham. When he left Hodge Hill School in 1968, he joined Birmingham City as an apprentice, and turned professional two years later. At school he had played as a midfielder, but became a full back while in Birmingham's reserves. He made his debut in the First Division on 30 August 1972 in a 2–2 draw away to West Bromwich Albion, but dropped out of consideration once Ray Martin was available again. He was released at the end of the 1972–73 season, and went on to play for Bury, Workington and Aldershot, for whom he played 137 league games. He became player-manager of Southern League Midland Division club Milton Keynes City, then played for Milton Keynes Borough and Newport Pagnell Town.
