= 1978–79 Kent Football League =

Association football league season

The 1978–79 Kent Football League season was the thirteenth in the history of the Kent Football League, a football competition featuring teams based in and around the county of Kent in England.

Following the decision taken previously to form a second division from this season the League structure comprised two divisions: Division One (now for clubs' first teams only) and a newly formed Division Two (to take the reserves teams which were no longer permitted in Division One, however this division was not limited to just reserves teams) with the latter becoming known as the Reserves Section. Additionally there were two league cup competitions: the Challenge Cup for the Division One clubs and another for the teams in Division Two.

== Division One ==
Kent Football League Division One
- Season: 1978–79
- Champions: Sheppey United
- Matches played: 306
- Goals scored: 915 (2.99 per match)

The league featured eighteen clubs, the fifteen non-reserves teams that had competed in Division One the previous season together with three additional clubs:

- Cray Wanderers, transferred as league champions from the London Spartan League
- Darenth Heathside, renamed from Heathside Sports and transferred from the London Spartan League
- Erith & Belvedere, transferred from the Athenian League

The league was won by Sheppey United, their third championship in seven seasons and part of a league and cup double.

League winners Sheppey United and fourth placed Medway both applied to join the Southern League for the following season however, their applications were unsuccessful.

At the end of the season Crockenhill were re-elected to continue their membership of Division One whilst bottom club Snowdown Colliery Welfare had their application to drop to Division Two approved.

=== League Table ===
Pos	Team	Pld	W	D	L	GF	GA	GD	Pts	Season End Notes
1	Sheppey United	34	22	11	1	73	28	+45	55	
2	Hythe Town	34	21	7	6	71	34	+37	49	
3	Faversham Town	34	22	5	7	71	37	+34	49	
4	Medway	34	18	10	6	64	27	+37	46	
5	Whitstable Town	34	18	7	9	52	35	+17	43	
6	Sittingbourne	34	16	7	11	57	42	+15	39	
7	Tunbridge Wells	34	15	6	13	51	52	−1	36	
8	Darenth Heathside	34	10	12	12	42	38	+4	32	
9	Deal Town	34	13	6	15	40	50	−10	32	
10	Ramsgate	34	14	4	16	42	59	−17	32	
11	Slade Green Athletic	34	8	13	13	46	47	−1	29	
12	Herne Bay (Note: Herne Bay were deducted two points and two goals for fielding an ineligible player (the deducted goals have been added back in this table).)	34	10	10	14	49	59	−10	28 (Note: Herne Bay deducted two points.)	
13	Dartford Glentworth	34	9	10	15	40	52	−12	28	
14	Cray Wanderers	34	9	9	16	50	65	−15	27	
15	Erith & Belvedere	34	8	9	17	49	48	+1	25	
16	Kent Police	34	10	4	20	46	67	−21	24	
17	Crockenhill	34	7	7	20	43	73	−30	21	Re-elected
18	Snowdown Colliery Welfare	34	4	7	23	29	102	−73	15	Resigned to Division Two

Source: "Kent League Tables: Kent League (Division 1) '78–'79". SCEFL. 7 May 2022., "Town's Results This Season: Final Table". Whitstable Times. 1 June 1979. p. 29 – via British Newspaper Archive.: (Note: The tables in both sources are net of Herne Bay's goal deduction)
Rules for classification: 1) points; 2) goal difference; 3) number of goals scored.

=== Challenge Cup ===
The 1978–79 Kent Football League Challenge Cup was won by Sheppey United, who completed a league and cup double. The competition, contested by all eighteen clubs in the league, comprised five single match tie rounds (with the first round featuring two ties) culminating in the final which was played on a neutral ground (at Sittingbourne this season).

==== Quarter-finals, Semi-finals and Final ====
Quarter-finals
Faversham Town	2
Tunbridge Wells	0
Sheppey United	1	1 (Note: Replay, after extra time (score at 90 minutes 0-0))
Darenth Heathside	1	0
Cray Wanderers	1
Herne Bay	2
Dartford Glentworth	1	1 (Note: Replay)
Hythe Town	1	3

Semi-finals
Faversham Town	2	1 (Note: Replay)
Sheppey United	2	2
Herne Bay	3
Hythe Town	1

Final
Sheppey United	4
Herne Bay	1

==== Second Round ====
- Faversham Town 2 – 1 Medway
- Tunbridge Wells 3 – 1 Kent Police
- Sheppey United 2 – 1 Deal Town
- Whitstable Town 0 – 1 Darenth Heathside
- Snowdown Colliery Welfare 0 – 3 Cray Wanderers
- Erith & Belvedere 0 – 0 Herne Bay
- REPLAY: Herne Bay 3 – 1 Erith & Belvedere
- Sittingbourne 6 – 2 Dartford Glentworth
- Hythe Town 2 – 1 Crockenhill

==== First Round ====
- Tunbridge Wells 1 – 1 Slade Green Athletic
- REPLAY: Slade Green Athletic 1 – 2 Tunbridge Wells
- Hythe Town 3 – 1 Ramsgate
- Byes for the other fourteen clubs

Sources:

- Final: "Checkpoint: Soccer Results: Kent League Cup Final". Sunday Mirror. 6 May 1979. p. 44 – via British Newspaper Archive.
- Semi-finals: "Checkpoint: Soccer Results: Kent League Cup.–Semi-finals". Sunday Mirror. 11 March 1979. p. 44 – via British Newspaper Archive.; "Sports Summary: Soccer: Kent League Cup.–Semi-final replay". Daily Mirror. 22 March 1979. p. 31 – via British Newspaper Archive.
- Quarter-finals: "County Soccer Details: Results: Saturday: Kent League Cup quarter finals". Kentish Express. 9 February 1979. p. 55 – via British Newspaper Archive.;"Results: Kent League Cup". Thanet Times. 13 February 1979. p. 31 – via British Newspaper Archive.; "County Soccer Details: Results: Saturday: Kent League Cup second (sic) round replay". Kentish Express. 2 March 1979. p. 55 – via British Newspaper Archive.; "County Soccer Details: Results: Tuesday: Kent League Cup quarter-final". Kentish Express. 2 March 1979. p. 55 – via British Newspaper Archive.
- Second Round: "County Soccer Details: Results: Saturday: Kent League Cup, 2nd round". Kentish Express. 15 December 1978. p. 55 – via British Newspaper Archive.; "County Soccer Details: Results: Saturday: Kent League Cup, 2nd round & 2nd Round replay". Kentish Express. 22 December 1978. p. 47 – via British Newspaper Archive.
- First Round: "Checkpoint: Soccer Results: Kent League Cup". Kent Messenger. 1 October 1978. p. 42 – via British Newspaper Archive.; "County Soccer Details: Results: Saturday: Kent League Cup, 1st round replay". Kentish Express. 20 October 1978. p. 63 – via British Newspaper Archive.

== Reserves Section ==
The letter "R" following team names indicates a club's reserves team.

The newly formed 1978–79 Division Two was formed to take the reserves teams (which were now not permitted in Division One) of clubs whose first team played in Division One and other higher ranked leagues – but was not limited to reserves teams. There was a League Cup competition for the teams in the section.

=== Division Two ===
Kent Football League Division Two
- Season: 1978–79
- Champions: Medway R

The league featured reserve teams from eleven clubs: Dover R, previously in Division One; Faversham Town R, Medway R and Sittingbourne R from the New Brompton League; Deal Town R, Herne Bay R, Hythe Town R, Margate R, Ramsgate R from the Kent Amateur League; together with Cray Wanderers R and Darenth Heathside R.

Medway R were the inaugural league winners and were unbeaten over the twenty match league campaign.

At the end of the season Margate R resigned from the league.

(The table below is not the final table, maximum potential matches per team = 20)

Pos	Team	Pld	W	D	L	GF	GA	GD	Pts	Season End Notes
1	Medway R	20	16	4	0	59	16	+43	36	
2	Herne Bay R	18	13	2	3	41	24	+17	28	
3	Darenth Heathside R	17	9	3	5	37	17	+20	21	
4	Faversham Town R (Note: Faversham Town R were deducted one point and one goal for fielding an ineligible player (the deducted goal has been added back in this table).)	18	8	5	5	29	23	+6	20 (Note: Faversham Town R were deducted one point.)	
5	Dover R	18	7	5	6	37	27	+10	19	
6	Deal Town R (Note: Deal Town R were deducted two points and one goal for fielding an ineligible player (the deducted goal has been added back in this table).)	18	5	7	6	20	25	−5	15 (Note: Deal Town R were deducted two points.)	
7	Margate R	16	5	4	7	23	24	−1	14	Resigned
8	Hythe Town R	18	3	7	8	25	32	−7	13	
9	Cray Wanderers R	13	4	1	8	18	36	−18	9	
10	Sittingbourne R	19	3	3	13	26	50	−24	9	
11	Ramsgate R	17	2	1	14	13	54	−41	5	

Updated to match(es) played on 8 May 1979 & matches played on 18th & 19th May 1979. Source: "County Soccer Details: Kent League: Division 2". Kentish Express. 11 May 1979. p. 23 – via British Newspaper Archive. (Note: Table is net of Deal Town R and Faversham Town R goal deductions) & "Soccer Details: Kent League: Division 2". Kent Messenger. 25 May 1979. p. 34 – via British Newspaper Archive. for results of 18th & 19th May 1979.
Rules for classification: 1) points; 2) goal difference; 3) number of goals scored.

=== Division Two Cup ===
The 1978–79 Kent Football League Division Two Cup was won by Dover R with Darenth Heathside R runners-up.

For the competition the eleven clubs from Division Two were arranged into two geographical groups and played each team on their group on a home and away basis. The winners of the groups advanced to the final.

Deal Town R, Dover R, Herne Bay R, Hythe Town R, Margate R and Ramsgate R were included in one group, with the remaining clubs, Cray Wanderers R, Darenth Heathside R, Faversham Town R, Medway R and Sittingbourne R in the other.
