= Gareth Risbridger =

English footballer (born 1982)

Personal information
- Date of birth: 16 April 1982 (age 44)
- Place of birth: High Wycombe, England
- Position: Midfielder

Youth career
- 1997–1998: Marlow

Senior career*
Years	Team	Apps	(Gls)
1998–2001	Yeovil Town		
2001–2002	Southend United	1	(0)
2001	→ Dover Athletic (loan)	3	(0)
2002	Salisbury City		
2002–2003	Aylesbury United		
2003–2010	Staines Town		
2006	→ Bracknell Town (loan)		
2010–2011	Boreham Wood		
2011–2012	Staines Town	5	(0)
2012–2013	St Albans City		
2013–2014	Slough Town		
2014	→ Binfield (loan)		

Managerial career
- 2014–2015: Burnham (joint)
- 2016–2017: Aylesbury
- * Club domestic league appearances and goals

Gareth Risbridger (born 16 April 1982) is an English football manager and former semi-professional player, who was most recently the assistant manager to Danny Gordon at Aylesbury after the pair were appointed in May 2016. They departed the club in January 2017.

He started his career as a youth player at Marlow, before joining Yeovil Town in 1998. Risbridger then signed for Third Division club Southend United following his former Yeovil manager David Webb, however he only made one appearance and was sent on loan to Conference National club Dover Athletic. He was released from Southend in January 2002, and dropped back into non-League football spending a month at Salisbury City before joining Aylesbury United. In December 2003, he joined former Aylesbury manager, Steve Cordery at Staines Town. After a number of injuries that kept him sidelined for two and a half years, Risbridger joined Bracknell Town on a short loan spell, regaining his fitness. He went on to join Boreham Wood in November 2010. After a period out of the game due to injury, he joined Slough Town in March 2014.

== Playing career ==
Risbridger started his career as a youth player at Marlow, playing the 1997–98 season in their under-18 team. In summer 1998, he joined Conference National side Yeovil Town, where he made six appearances.

He signed for Third Division team Southend United in May 2001, after former Yeovil Town manager David Webb took charge at Southend. Risbridger was the first of three players who Webb signed from his former club, Barrington Belgrave and Ben Smith joined later. Risbridger commented on playing under Webb saying, "I worked with him at Yeovil and he gave me my chance there last year. Now I'm looking forward to playing under him again and establishing myself with Southend." During the 2001–02 season, he made one appearance for Southend. On 11 August, Risbridger made his debut for Southend in their 1–0 home win over Darlington, replacing Mark Rawle as a substitute in the 89th minute, who had previously replaced Dean Holness. He joined Dover Athletic on loan in October, where he made three appearances in the Conference National. Risbridger was not allowed to play in Dover Athletic's FA Cup fourth qualifying round match against Hereford United, as Southend did not want him to become cup-tied. He was released from Southend in January 2002, by new manager Rob Newman along with Shane Wardley and Ed Chibogu.

Following his release from Southend United, Risbridger dropped back into non-League football and signed for Southern Football League Premier Division club, Salisbury City in February. A month later, he joined Aylesbury United, for who he went on to make 44 appearances in all competitions, scoring one goal. In December 2003, Risbridger signed for Isthmian League Division One South side Staines Town, joining former Aylesbury manager Steve Cordery. He made his debut against Horsham in their 0–0 on 6 December. Between January 2004 and July 2006, Risbridger suffered a series of injuries, that put him out of the game for two and a half years. He had a spell with Bracknell Town on loan in October 2006, to help regain his fitness. At the end of the 2006–07 season he was awarded the "Clubman of the Year" award.

Risbridger played in Staines 2007–08 FA Cup first round giant-killing match, when they defeated Stockport County over two legs, eventually winning in a penalty shootout. Staines were defeated in the following round 5–0 at home to Peterborough United, on 1 December, in which Risbridger played.

He went on to join Conference South club Boreham Wood in November 2010.

== Coaching and refereeing career ==
Risbridger holds a UEFA 'B' Pro Licence coaching badge and is also a qualified referee.

In December 2014, Risbridger was appointed joint-manager, alongside Danny Gordon, at Burnham as the replacements for Gary Meakin. However the pair departed the club in May 2015 after proving unsuccessful in their bid to prevent Burnham's relegation from the Premier Division.

Risbridger returned to football as the assistant manager to Danny Gordon at Aylesbury in May 2016. The pair resigned from their positions in January 2017.

== Personal life ==
Born in High Wycombe, Buckinghamshire, Risbridger lives in Marlow. He works as a greenkeeper at Wycombe Heights Golf Club.
