= 1976–77 Essex Senior Football League =

The 1976–77 season was the sixth in the history of Essex Senior Football League, a football competition in England.

The league featured 14 clubs which competed in the league last season, along with three new clubs:

- Chelmsford City reserves
- Sawbridgeworth, joined from the Essex Olympian League, renaming themselves Sawbridgeworth Town
- Woodford Town

Basildon United were champions, winning their first Essex Senior League title.

== League table ==
Essex Senior Football League
- Season: 1976–77
- Champions: Basildon United
- Matches played: 272
- Goals scored: 830 (3.05 per match)

Pos	Team	Pld	W	D	L	GF	GA	GD	Pts	Promotion or relegation
1	Basildon United	32	26	3	3	75	16	+59	55	
2	Brentwood	32	24	5	3	77	35	+42	53	
3	Billericay Town	32	23	5	4	88	23	+65	51	Transferred to the Athenian League
4	Brightlingsea United	32	18	8	6	56	36	+20	44	
5	Bowers United	32	16	9	7	52	32	+20	41	
6	Eton Manor	32	12	9	11	45	42	+3	33	
7	Woodford Town	32	13	6	13	50	50	0	32	
8	Maldon Town	32	11	8	13	42	51	−9	30	
9	Tiptree United	32	10	9	13	46	58	−12	29	
10	Canvey Island	32	9	9	14	39	47	−8	27	
11	Heybridge Swifts	32	10	7	15	44	57	−13	27	
12	Sawbridgeworth Town	32	8	6	18	34	56	−22	22	
13	Chelmsford City reserves	32	7	8	17	42	65	−23	22	
14	Ford United	32	6	10	16	29	56	−27	22	
15	Witham Town	32	6	7	19	39	65	−26	19	
16	Stansted	32	6	7	19	42	71	−29	19	
17	Coggeshall Town	32	4	10	18	30	70	−40	18	

Source: fchd
Rules for classification: 1) points; 2) goal difference; 3) number of goals scored.
