= Milton Keynes Borough F.C. =

British Football Club

Milton Keynes Borough F.C. was a football club that formed in the 1970s, rising alongside the newly established town of Milton Keynes. Originally starting as Denbigh United and later Belsize, it was renamed Milton Keynes Borough after success in local leagues such as the United Counties League. By 1979, they had progressed to the Hellenic League.

== History ==
Milton Keynes Borough F.C. was a football club formed in the 1970s as part of the burgeoning football scene in the new town of Milton Keynes. It began its journey under different names, initially known as Denbigh United and later Belsize, representing the Bletchley-based Belsize Engineering company. The club joined the United Counties League in 1970 and experienced early success, scoring over 100 goals in each of its first three seasons. By 1976, the club was rebranded as Milton Keynes Borough, continuing to rise through local leagues.

They were known for competing in the United Counties League, Hellenic League, and later, the South Midlands League, where they finished 12th in 1993, their final season before dissolving.

The club struggled in the FA Cup, participating in several preliminary rounds but failing to make any significant progress. Their best-known cup match came during the 1986-87 season, a 3-2 defeat to Stevenage.

== Results and League Performance ==
1986-87 FA Cup: Milton Keynes Borough’s most famous FA Cup appearance was a close 3-2 loss to Stevenage in one of the preliminary rounds.

South Midlands League (1993): The club folded after finishing 12th in the league during their final season .

Name Change: After disbanding, the club reformed briefly under the name Milton Keynes F.C., and later in 1999, as Bletchley Town, but both reincarnations were short-lived.

== Legacy and Dissolution ==
Milton Keynes Borough F.C. was part of the early football heritage of the area, playing a role in fostering local talent and contributing to the local sports culture before larger clubs, such as Milton Keynes Dons, became prominent. Though the club dissolved in 1993 and subsequent attempts to revive it under different names were unsuccessful, it remains a part of the history of football in Milton Keynes.
