= Maidenhead Town F.C. =

Association football club in England

Maidenhead Town
- Full name: Maidenhead Town Football Club
- League: Combined Counties League Division One
- 2025–26: Thames Valley Premier League Premier Division, 3rd of 15 (promoted)
- Website: maidenheadtownfc.co.uk
Home colours

Maidenhead Town Football Club is a football club based in Maidenhead, England. They are currently members of the Combined Counties League Division One.

== History ==
Maidenhead Social joined the Hellenic Football League for the 1971–72 season. In 1974, they were renamed Maidenhead Town. At the end of the 1985–86 season they were due to be relegated to Division One, but instead transferred to the Chiltonian League, in which they spent four seasons before folding in 1990.

A new Maidenhead Town club was formed in 2004, which played in the East Berkshire League before gaining admission to the Thames Valley Premier League for the 2016–17 season, where they stayed for ten seasons.

In 2026, the club was admitted into the Combined Counties League Division One.

== Ground ==
Maidenhead Town's ground is at Bisham Abbey (51.5584°N 0.7777°W). However, in August 2025 the club's first team began playing their home matches at the 1878 Stadium, in a two-year groundsharing agreement with Burnham F.C.. This was made necessary by the desire of Maidenhead Town to play in the National League System, for which the Bisham Abbey facilities would not be acceptable.

== Records ==
- FA Vase
  - Second Round 1983–84
