= Burnham F.C. =

English football club

Coordinates: 51°32′16″N 0°40′0″W

Burnham Football Club
- Full name: Burnham Football Club
- Nickname: The Blues
- Founded: 1878
- Stadium: The 1878 Stadium
- Capacity: 2,500
- Manager: Mo Bakali and Omar Bakali (Joint)
- League: Combined Counties League Premier Division North
- 2025–26: Combined Counties League Premier Division North, 5th of 20
- Website: http://www.burnhamfc1878.co.uk
Home colours	Away colours

Burnham F.C. is a non-League football club based in Burnham in Buckinghamshire, near Slough. They currently compete in the Combined Counties League Premier Division North. The team play in blue and white shirts and white shorts. Home matches are played at The 1878 Stadium, previously known as The Gore, which has been recently redeveloped to include a new 3G pitch, supporter stand and club facilities.

== History ==
The club was founded in 1878, and so Burnham FC is the second oldest club in Buckinghamshire. The club spent its first years in various local leagues, and then joined the Great Western Combination league in 1948. 16 years later they moved to the Wycombe Combination in 1964 and then spent one year in the Reading Combination for the 1970–71 season.

The team first joined a senior league in 1971 when they entered the Hellenic Football League Division One A, finishing as runners-up in their first season, followed by a runners-up position in Division One which saw them promoted to the Premier Division. In 1975–76 they were Premier Division champions. In 1977 they switched to the Athenian League, where they achieved two runners-up finishes, and also reached the semi-finals of the FA Vase.

In 1984 Burnham switched leagues to the London Spartan League, where they were champions at the first attempt. The following year the club merged with Hillingdon F.C. to form Burnham & Hillingdon F.C., taking over Hillingdon's place in the Southern League. In 1987 the club's name reverted simply to Burnham F.C. but performances on the pitch declined and the 1994–95 season saw the club relegated back to the Hellenic League. In four seasons back at this level the club never finished out of the top 5, resulting in promotion back to the Southern League in 1999. Due to the renaming and restructuring of divisions they technically played in three different divisions without ever being relegated or promoted during their time in the Southern League.

Burnham have had modest success in cup competitions. Their best run in the FA Vase came in the 1982–83 season where they lost to Halesowen Town in a two legged semi-final (the home match being the club's highest recorded attendance). In 1999–2000 they reached the 4th round of the FA Trophy where they drew Scarborough, then residing in the Conference (they had also recently been relegated from the Football League). Burnham managed a 1–1 draw at home before losing 6–0 in the replay. In the 2005–06 season, Dave Mudge's Burnham side achieved their best run in the FA Cup, losing 3–1 at home to Aldershot Town in the 1st round proper. The game was watched by one of the biggest crowds at Burnham in recent years and even saw Burnham appear briefly on Match of the Day.

Burnham completed one of their best seasons in recent memory when they finished 3rd in the Southern League Division One South & West in 2006–07. Due to this league position they entered the promotion playoffs but lost at home in the semi-final 1–2 to eventual playoff winners Swindon Supermarine. This outcome was mirrored three seasons later, when, under the managerial guidance of Jamie Jarvis, the Blues again lost out in the semi-final of the play-offs, this time to Chesham United. Martin Stone was appointed manager in December 2011 and under his stewardship the club enjoyed its most successful period.

After winning the Wycombe Senior Cup in 2011–12 the 2012–13 season saw the club gain promotion to the Southern League Premier Division when they finished as champions of the Division One Central. This was to be the first time Burnham had ever played at this level of football, but they had to reckon without top scorer Ryan Bird, who signed for Portsmouth. Martin Stone resigned in January 2014 with the club 8th in the Southern League Premier Division.

After just surviving relegation from the Southern League Premier Division having finished in 20th position in the 2013–14 season, the club appointed former Hillingdon Borough, Northwood and Wingate & Finchley manager Gary Meakin who joined the club from Beaconsfield SYCOB. Byron Walton, who most recently served as SYCOB manager before leaving in 2012, joined as general manager.

Meakin resigned from his position as manager after the 0–0 draw with Chippenham Town on 29 November 2014, a result that left Burnham in 21st position. Burnham then appointed a joint managerial team of Danny Gordon and Gareth Risbridger, who both assumed the role as joint-managers, in December 2014 as Meakin's replacements.

Both Gordon and Risbridger departed the club, following their relegation from the Premier Division, in May 2015. The board moved quickly appointing former Binfield boss Mark Tallentire as the club's new manager on 11 May 2015, but he resigned in September 2015 bringing about yet another change in manager. On 23 November, Burnham confirmed a further managerial change, with former professional player Dave Tuttle taking charge. Tuttle therefore became Burnham's third manager already during the 2015–16 season and their sixth in the previous two campaigns.

On 19 April 2016, Burnham lost 2–1 at home to Didcot Town. This defeat confirmed the club's second successive relegation and will see them play at a level below the Southern League for the first time since the late 1990s, when they played in the Hellenic Football League. Burnham's chairman was quoted as saying that registering 112 players over the course of the season was "unforgivable" and was one of the contributing factors towards the club's relegation. Following relegation, Burnham appealed against their demotion. They were ultimately unsuccessful and it was confirmed they would play in the Hellenic Football League for season 2016–17.

Despite a promising pre-season with two wins, Burnham's new first team suffered their heaviest defeat in six years when they lost 8–1 to Thame United in their first game of the Hellenic League season.

In August 2016, the club parted company with manager Dave Tuttle. The club's director of football, former Watford player and England international Luther Blissett continued to direct the coaching, along with Bliss8 assistant coaches. It was announced that a new first team manager would be recruited working within the club's development strategy. Blissett's first game in charge resulted in an 11–0 home defeat to Thatcham Town as Burnham's poor start to the season continued. Due to the heavy nature of this defeat, the result and highlights were available on the BBC website, and discussed briefly in The Guardian "Football Weekly" podcast. On 27 September, Burnham announced that former Watford player Gifton Noel-Williams would be taking over the managerial job at the club. He led the team to their first points of the season in October, but the club announced on 9 November that Noel-Williams had left the club. As a result, Blissett again took charge of the team.

On 11 January, it was revealed that Burnham had appointed two coaches from nearby Slough Town to manage the team in their bid to avoid yet another relegation. However, that move was met with surprise from temporary coach Luther Blissett who said they and 15 new players were appointed without his knowing, and before he had been informed his services were no longer required. The latest change to the club's structure was later confirmed by the club's official Twitter account.

Despite a slight improvement to their end of season form, and managing to finish the season 17th out of 18 teams, Burnham finished in the relegation places. However, they avoided a third straight relegation to the Hellenic Division One East for the 2017–18 season following the resignation from the Premier Division of Ardley United. The end of the 2016–17 also saw Burnham's chairman depart, as well as one of their joint managers, Jon Palmer. Mark Betts stated that the club "...would need to be sorted out behind the scenes". In the 2017–18 season Burnham were relegated from the Hellenic Premier Division with two games left to play, but they did manage to get to the Bluefin Sport Supplementary Cup final.

Burnham started the 2018–19 season in the Hellenic League Division One East, the lowest level of the football pyramid they have played at since the late 1960s. At the end of the 2020–21 season the club were transferred to the Combined Counties League Premier Division North. In October 2021 Ash James resigned his position due to work and family commitments and his assistant Manny Williams stepped in to take over as first team manager. Williams left the club by mutual consent in January 2022. On 22 January 2022 Ben Murray took over at The 1878 Stadium.

Burnham won the Premier Challenge Cup at the end of the 2023–24 season, beating Virginia Water 2–1 at The Racecourse Ground. Then, in October 2024, Ben Murray and his assistant Kavi Luchowa parted company with Burnham FC by mutual consent and the Bakali brothers Mo and Omar, originally from Rising Ballers Kensington and who were by now already part of the management team at Burnham, took over as joint managers.

== Seasons ==
Year	League	Lvl	Pld	W	D	L	GF	GA	GD	Pts	Position	Leading league scorer		FA Cup		FA Trophy		Average home attendance
Year	League	Lvl	Pld	W	D	L	GF	GA	GD	Pts	Position	Name	Goals	Res	Rec	Res	Rec	Average home attendance
2011–12	Southern Football League; Division One Central	8	42	13	13	16	64	67	−3	52	15th of 22			QR3	3–1–1	PR	0–1–1	
2012–13	Southern Football League; Division One Central	8	42	31	6	5	108	39	69	99	1st of 22; Promoted	Ryan Bird	42	PR	0–0–1	QR2	1–0–1	
2013–14	Southern Football League; Premier Division	7	44	12	8	24	60	91	−31	44	20th of 23	Ryan Blake	12	QR2	1–0–1	QR2	1–0–1	134
2014–15	Southern Football League; Premier Division	7	44	5	8	31	41	89	−48	20*	23rd of 23; Relegated	Nicke Kabamba	10	QR2	1–0–1	QR2	1–3–0	132
2015–16	Southern Football League; Division One South & West	8	42	6	6	30	39	99	−60	24	21st of 22; Relegated	Tre Mitford	9	PR	0–1–1	PR	0–0–1	79

== Ground ==
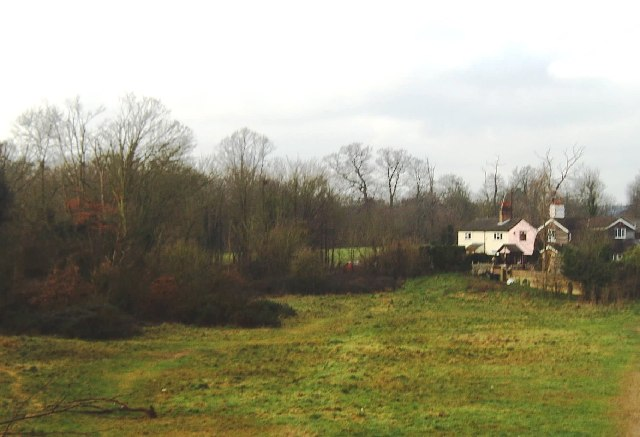
The Gore, Burnham

Burnham play their games at The 1878 Stadium, previously known as The Gore, Wymers Wood Road, Burnham SL1 8JG.

In December 2010, Burnham FC applied to the Southern Football League to lay a new third generation (3G) playing surface at The Gore, which was sanctioned in January 2011. During July 2021 this new 3G artificial playing surface was installed at the renamed 1878 Stadium, replacing the original grass pitch to provide all year round football for the players, supporters and local community.

Other teams that have shared the ground since the 3G pitch was installed include Wargrave FC, Wycombe Wanderers Women FC and from 2023 Southall FC.

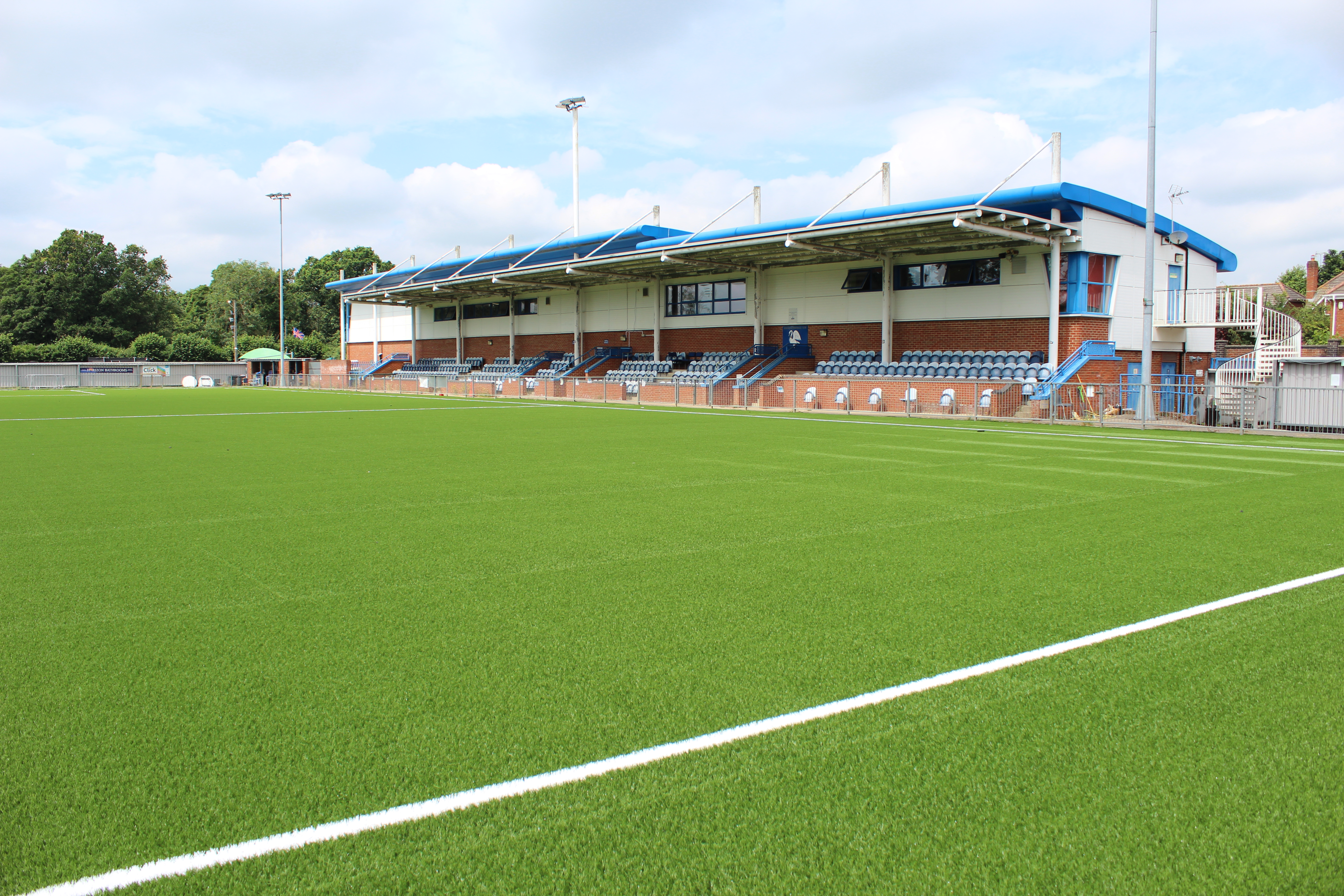
The 1878 Stadium, Burnham Football Club

== Club honours ==
- Southern Football League Division One Central :
  - Winners (1): 2012–13
- Hellenic Football League Premier Division :
  - Winners (2): 1975–76, 1998–99
- Hellenic Football League Division One:
  - Runners-up (2): 1971–72, 1972–73
- Athenian League :
  - Runners-up (2): 1978–79, 1979–80
- London Spartan League :
  - Winners (1): 1984–85
- Great Western Combination League Premier Division :
  - Runners-up (1): 1954–55
- Great Western Combination League Division one :
  - Runners-up (1): 1952–53
- Wycombe Combination League :
  - Runners-up (4): 1965–66, 1966–67, 1968–69, 1969–70
- Hellenic League Challenge Cup :
  - Winners (1): 1998–99
- Hellenic League Premier Division Cup:
  - Winners (1): 1975–76
- Hellenic League Division One Cup :
  - Winners (1): 1972–73
  - Runners-up (1): 1971–72
- London Spartan League Cup :
  - Winners (1): 1984–85
- Reading Combination League Cup :
  - Winners (1): 1970–71
- Slough Cup :
  - Winners (9): 1927–28, 1935–36, 1936–37, 1948–49, 1950–51, 1958–59, 1959–60, 1961–62, 1969–70
- Wycombe Senior Cup :
  - Winners (9): 1897–98, 1908–09, 1925–26, 1934–35, 1951–52, 1966–67, 1969–70, 2008–09, 2011–12
- Combined Counties Football League Premier Challenge Cup :
  - Winners (1): 2023–24

== Club records ==
- Best league performance: 20th in Southern League Premier Division, 2013–14
- Best FA Cup performance: 1st round proper, 2005–06, lost 3–1 to Aldershot Town at The Gore
- Best FA Trophy performance: 4th round, 1999–2000, lost 6–0 to Scarborough at the McCain Stadium (Replay following 1–1 draw at The Gore)
- Best FA Vase performance: Semi-final, 1982–83

== Sources ==
- Burnham at the Football Club History Database
