= Abingdon Town F.C. =

Association football club in England

Coordinates: 51°39′55.63″N 1°16′46.06″W

- Full name: Abingdon Town Football Club
- Nickname: The Abbotts
- Founded: 1870
- Ground: Culham Road, Abingdon
- Capacity: 3,000 (271 seated)
- Chairman: Andy Bone
- Manager: Jon Beames
- League: Oxfordshire Senior League Premier Division
- 2025–26: Oxfordshire Senior League Premier Division, 6th of 14
Home colours

Abingdon Town Football Club is a football club based in Abingdon, Oxfordshire, England. They are currently members of the Oxfordshire Senior League Premier Division and play at Culham Road.

== History ==
The club was established as Abingdon Football Club in 1870. In 1892 they joined the Oxford & District League. After absorbing St Michaels in 1899, they went on to win back-to-back league titles in the next two seasons. After the second title the club joined the Berks & Bucks League, but left after a single season to join the West Berks League. In 1904 they changed leagues again, this time transferring to the Reading Temperance League.

In 1919 Abingdon joined the North Berks League, going on to win the league title at the first attempt. After a second championship win in 1922–23 the club switched to the Reading & District League. In 1928 they became Abingdon Town. After a third-place finish in Division One in 1931–32 the club were promoted to the Premier Division. Although they finished bottom of the table in the next two seasons they were not relegated. They finished bottom again in 1936–37, after which they transferred into the Oxfordshire Senior League for a season (in which they also finished last), before returning to the North Berks League in 1938.

Following World War II Abingdon Town rejoined the Reading & District League in 1945. They were runners-up in 1946–47 after losing a championship play-off to Thatcham Town. However, the following season saw the club win the league. In 1950 they moved up to the Spartan League, in which they played for three seasons before becoming founder members of the Hellenic League in 1953. When the league gained a second division in 1956 the club were placed in the Premier Division and went on to win the division in its first season. They were champions again in 1958–59, also winning the Berks & Bucks Senior Cup, and retained the league title the following season.

After their back-to-back titles, Abingdon's success diminished and in 1965–66 the club finished bottom of the Premier Division and were relegated to Division One. The following season saw them finish as Division One runners-up, earning an immediate promotion back to the Premier Division. Although they went on to be runners-up in both 1970–71 and 1971–72, the club finished bottom of the division again in 1974–75, resulting in relegation back to Division One. However, another immediate return was achieved as they won Division One at the first attempt, losing only one league match all season.

Abingdon Town were Premier Division champions for a fourth time in 1986–87, and after finishing second the following season, they returned to the Spartan League, joining its Premier Division. The club won the Spartan League at the first attempt, earning promotion to Division Two South of the Isthmian League. They were Division One South champions in 1990–91 and were promoted to Division One. After seven seasons in Division One the club were relegated to Division Two at the end of the 1997–98 season. The following season they were relegated again, this time to Division Two. The club returned to Division Two when the league was restructured in 2002, although it was effectively a rename of Division Three.

Despite a seventh-place finish in Division Two in 2004–05, Abingdon Town dropped into the Premier Division of the Hellenic League. The next nine seasons saw the club struggle, finishing outside the bottom four on only three occasions. In 2013–14 the club ended the season in last place in the Premier Division, subsequently dropping two divisions into Division One of the North Berks League. The club was inactive during the 2016–17 season, but returned to the Hellenic League for the 2017–18 season, joining Division Two East, which was largely composed of reserve teams. They moved up to Division One East prior to the 2018–19 season.

Abingdon Town made headlines in December 2019 when, after conceding eight goals in the first half of a league match against rivals Abingdon United, the team refused to play the second half and instead left the ground. Abingdon Town's manager Tranell Richardson resigned the following day, claiming the team had been unable to train for three months due to lack of facilities, and accusing the club's officials of not providing enough support. Within a few days new manager, Byron O'Regan, and assistant, Chris Adams, were brought in to bring stability back to the club in the short term. In their spell at the club they raised their profile, including appearances on BBC Oxford Sports Report. Before finishing his short term tenure prior to the COVID-19 pandemic lockdown of March 2020, Byron O'Regan and his team successfully improved the quality of their squad including signing Trinidad and Tobago's Jacob Blackstock.

Ahead of the 2021–22 season, Abingdon Town withdrew from the Hellenic League after failing to reach an agreement with Culham Road's new owners. After being renamed Abingdon Abbots, they joined Division One of the Oxfordshire Senior League for the 2022–23 season. The club were runners-up in Division One in 2023–24 and were promoted to the Premier Division. They were renamed Abingdon Town ahead of the 2024–25 season.

== Ground ==
The club played at Culham Road. A stand was built in 1928 and two years later the club were able to buy the ground for £300. The stand burnt down following an Easter Monday game soon after World War II and was replaced in 1948. A covered terrace was built in 1950. The pitch was later rotated 90° and a new main stand built in 1991, with its seats taken from the original Wembley Stadium. One end of the ground has covered standing, with an open terrace at the other end. The ground has a capacity of 3,000, of which 1,771 is covered and 271 seated.

In June 2021 the ground was sold to Singaporean-based company iRama.

== Honours ==
- Isthmian League
  - Division Two South champions 1990–91
- Hellenic League
  - Premier Division champions 1956–57, 1958–59, 1959–60, 1986–87
  - Division One champions 1975–76
- Spartan League
  - Premier Division champions 1988–89
- Reading & District League
  - Champions 1947–48
- North Berks League
  - Champions 1919–20, 1922–23
- Oxford & District League
  - Champions 1899–1900, 1900–01
- Berks & Bucks Senior Cup
  - Winner 1958–59

== Records ==
- Best FA Cup performance: Fourth qualifying round, 1960–61, 1989–90, 1992–93
- Best FA Trophy performance: First round, 1992–93
- Best FA Vase performance: Fifth round, 1975–76, 1985–86, 1989–90
- Record attendance: 4,000 vs Swindon Town, Maurice Owen benefit match, 1950

== See also ==
- Abingdon Town F.C. players
- Abingdon Town F.C. managers
