= Hazells F.C. =

Hazells
- Full name: Hazells (Aylesbury) F.C.
- Founded: Unknown
- Dissolved: 1994
- Ground: Victoria Park Sports Ground, Aylesbury

Hazells (Aylesbury) Football Club was a football club based in Aylesbury, Buckinghamshire. The club was formed by staff at the Hazell, Watson and Viney printing works in the town, and competed in the Hellenic and Chiltonian Leagues between 1957 and 1994.

== History ==
There are early records of a Hazells FC competing in the Aylesbury & District Football League as early as 1923/24.

By 1928–29, the club were competing in Division 2 of the Spartan League. An article in The Bucks Herald in October 1930 described the team as "not experiencing the best luck this season", and by February 1936 the team was competing in the Aylesbury & District League. Notably, by this time, records exist of a match between Morris Motors Ladies and Hazell Ladies, showing the existence of a women's team, despite the ban on women's football that was in place at the time.

By the late 1950s, the club were familiar faces in the Hellenic League, winning the Division 1 title in 1959–60 and achieving promotion to the Premier Division, finishing in third place in their first two seasons. The club maintained top-half finishes in each season thereafter, narrowly missing out on the Premier Division title in 1966–67 on goal difference, having scored seven more goals than champions Witney Town, and conceded an extra sixteen. That season saw Witney winning their third Premier Division title in a row – a feat which remains unmatched today.

The following season, 1967–68, saw Hazells finish two points above Witney, and becoming Hellenic League Premier Division champions for the first and only time.

That success was not to last long, as Hazells struggled in the following 1968–69 season, finishing in thirteenth place out of seventeen, before ending the 1969–70 season at the bottom of the Premier Division, having amassed only four points all season. Despite their poor showing in the league, 1969–70 marked their first – and only – season competing in the FA Cup. Having beaten Ware at home in the Preliminary Round, Hazells fell to a 6-1 defeat away at Hounslow in the First Qualifying Round.

In their first season back in Division One, Hazells placed fifteenth out of twenty teams, and were assigned to the newly created Division One A for the following season.

The 1972–73 season saw renewed success for the club, narrowly winning promotion from the reformed Division One and returning to the Premier Division. The following season, however, saw Hazells yet again finishing rock bottom of the Premier Division, losing twenty-seven out of thirty games and conceding 100 goals.

The team yo-yoed between the Premier Division and Division One for much of the 1970s and 1980s, before joining the then relatively new Chiltonian League for the 1987–88 season. The following year, Hazells finished bottom of the Chiltonian Premier Division and were relegated to Division One, where they remained until the club disbanded in 1994, three years after the closure of Hazell, Watson and Viney.
