= Pinehurst F.C. =

English football club

Pinehurst F.C. was an association football club from Wiltshire in England.

They joined the Hellenic Football League in 1966–67 and remained in the league for 12 seasons, the last 11 of which they played in the Premier Division. Pinehurst left the league at the end of the 1977–78 season.

They finished as runners-up in the Premier in 1968–69, and were 3rd the season before.

In 1994–95 a team called Pinehurst were competing in Division One of the Wiltshire Football League and played at the Pinehurst School Field in Beech Avenue, Swindon. In 1995–96 they won the Division One title. By 2004–05 there was no team called Pinehurst in the Wiltshire League but there was a team called Pinehurst OB competing in the 3rd level of the league.
