= Newbury Town F.C. =

Newbury Town
- Full name: Newbury Town Football Club
- Nickname(s): Town
- Founded: 1887
- Dissolved: 1995
- Ground: Town Ground, Faraday Road, Newbury
- Capacity: 2,500
Home colours	Away colours

Newbury Town F.C. was a football club based in Newbury, England. During their long history, they twice won the Hellenic League and in 1994 they won Division 2 of the Isthmian League and reached the Quarter-finals of the national FA Vase, but within a year had ceased to exist. Since then there have been two successor clubs playing at the same venue.

== Club history ==
Newbury Town were founded in 1887 and initially played only friendly fixtures. In the 1890s they began entering the FA Cup, where they were defeated 0–14 by Southampton at the Antelope Ground in the 1894–95 season. However, during this time Newbury recorded plenty of success locally as they won the numerous Berks & Bucks Cups, including the Senior Cup in 1897–98.

After playing at several different locations within the town, the club settled at Faraday Road but all throughout their existence faced numerous problems such as lease renewals and property development, not to mention problems with the actual pitch itself.

In 1914 Newbury Town joined the Great Western Suburban League winning the league in the 1925–6 season. They remained in the league until 1927 when they joined the Hampshire League where they remained for just one season before entering the Reading League. Here the club would become a powerful force, winning the league title five times as well as the Reading Senior Cup in 1931–32. In 1952 Newbury stepped up to the now defunct Metropolitan League where they would play for seven seasons, and won the cup which was presented to the highest scoring amateur team in the league, five times. The club was managed by a former professional left back, Les Gaunt, who previously played for Leeds United and Reading.

A tough season in 1961–62 saw Newbury transfer to the Hellenic League, where they took the place of their Reserves who had joined the league as founder members in 1953. Here they soon got back on track and twice won the League Cup in 1959–60 and 1968–69.

After relocating the pitch and make numerous ground improvements, the 1970s saw Newbury's fortunes take off. They twice won the Hellenic League title in 1977–78 and 1980–81 (also finishing runners-up in 1977–78). In 1982 the club switched to the now defunct Athenian League and again enjoyed great success, winning the league title at the first attempt. During this time Newbury enjoyed several good runs in the national cup competitions. In 1979–80 they reached Round 5 of the FA Vase and the following season reached the 3rd Qualifying Round of the FA Cup.

In 1983 Newbury made a successful application to join Division 2 of the expanding Isthmian League and here they held down a comfortable mid-table position for a number of seasons. In 1993–94 Newbury had a fine season as they won promotion as champions and reached the Quarter Finals of the FA Vase where they were knocked out 0–2 by Taunton Town.

The success was short-lived, as they were relegated straight back the following season and, tragically, worse was to follow in the summer of 1995 when a severe financial crisis forced the club to withdraw from the competition and fold.

== Honours ==
- Isthmian League Division 2
  - Champions 1993/94
- Athenian League
  - Champions 1982/83
- Hellenic League Premier Division
  - Champions 1978/79 & 1980/81
- Hellenic League Cup
  - Winners 1959/60 & 1968/69
- Reading League
  - Champions 5 times
- Great Western Suburban League
  - Champions 1925/26
- Berks & Bucks Senior Cup
  - Winners
- Reading Senior Cup
  - Winners 1931/32

== Playing records ==
=== League history 1952-95 ===
Season	Division	Position	Significant events
1952/53	Metropolitan & District League	4/16	
1953/54	Metropolitan & District League	12/18	
1954/55	Metropolitan & District League	3/17	
1955/56	Metropolitan & District League	8/17	
1956/57	Metropolitan & District League	6/18	
1957/58	Metropolitan & District League	9/18	
1958/59	Metropolitan & District League	6/19	
1959/60	Metropolitan & District League	9/20	
1960/61	Metropolitan & District League	6/18	
1961/62	Metropolitan & District League	15/17	left competition
1962/63	Hellenic League Premier Division	6/16	
1963/64	Hellenic League Premier Division	14/18	
1964/65	Hellenic League Premier Division	12/18	
1965/66	Hellenic League Premier Division	11/18	
1966/67	Hellenic League Premier Division	14/18	
1967/68	Hellenic League Premier Division	14/17	
1968/69	Hellenic League Premier Division	8/17	
1969/70	Hellenic League Premier Division	10/18	
1970/71	Hellenic League Premier Division	15/18	
1971/72	Hellenic League Premier Division	10/17	
1972/73	Hellenic League Premier Division	17/17	Relegated
1973/74	Hellenic League Division 1	3/21	Promoted
1974/75	Hellenic League Premier Division	5/17	
1975/76	Hellenic League Premier Division	5/16	
1976/77	Hellenic League Premier Division	7/16	
1977/78	Hellenic League Premier Division	2/16	Runners-up, not promoted
1978/79	Hellenic League Premier Division	1/14	Champions, not promoted
1979/80	Hellenic League Premier Division	8/16	
1980/81	Hellenic League Premier Division	1/16	Champions, not promoted
1981/82	Hellenic League Premier Division	4/16	left competition
1982/83	Athenian League	1/20	Champions, promoted
1983/84	Isthmian League Division 2	16/22	
1984/85	Isthmian League Division 2 South	18/19	
1985/86	Isthmian League Division 2 South	4/20	
1986/87	Isthmian League Division 2 South	20/21	
1987/88	Isthmian League Division 2 South	18/22	
1988/89	Isthmian League Division 2 South	19/21	
1989/90	Isthmian League Division 2 South	7/21	
1990/91	Isthmian League Division 2 South	8/22	
1991/92	Isthmian League Division 2	22/22	Not relegated
1992/93	Isthmian League Division 2	9/22	
1993/94	Isthmian League Division 2	1/22	Champions, promoted
1994/95	Isthmian League Division 1	20/22	Relegated, then folded

=== FA Cup (Post War) ===
Season	Round	Opponents	Result
1945/46	Preliminary Round	H v Banbury Spencer	L 0–8
1961/62	1st Qualifying Round	A v Cowes	L 1–3
1962/63	1st Qualifying Round	A v Chichester City	W 3–2
	2nd Qualifying Round	H v Alton Town	L 1–9
1963/64	1st Qualifying Round	H v Hemel Hempstead Town	D 0-0
	Replay	A v Hemel Hempstead	L 0–6
1964/65	1st Qualifying Round	H v Abingdon Town	W 2–0
	2nd Qualifying Round	H v Oxford City	L 0–2
1965/66	1st Qualifying Round	A v Salisbury	L 0–4
1966/67	1st Qualifying Round	H v Andover	L 0–3
1977/78	1st Qualifying Round	H v Bridgwater Town	L 0–1
1978/79	Preliminary Round	A v Andover	D 1-1
	Replay	H v Andover	L 1–2
1979/80	1st Qualifying Round	H v Didcot Town	W 2–1
	2nd Qualifying Round	H v Barry Town	L 1–2
1980/81	Preliminary Round	H v Pagham	W 1–0
	1st Qualifying Round	H v Chichester City	W 2–0
	2nd Qualifying Round	A v Bognor Regis Town	W 2–1
	3rd Qualifying Round	A v Farnborough Town	L 1–4
1981/82	1st Qualifying Round	H v Burnham	W 4–3
	1st Qualifying Round	A v Camberley Town	W 2–0
	2nd Qualifying Round	H v Wealdstone	L 1–6
1982/83	Preliminary Round	A v Mangotsfield United	L 2–3
1983/84	Preliminary Round	H v Devizes Town	W 4–2
	1st Qualifying Round	A v Hungerford Town	L 1–6
1984/85	Qualifying Round	H v Slough Town	L 1–5
1985/86	Preliminary Round	H v Melksham Town	W 2–1
	1st Qualifying Round	A v AFC Totton	D 3-3
	Replay	H v AFC Totton	L 0–2
1986/87	1st Qualifying Round	H v Petersfield United	W 2–1
	2nd Qualifying Round	H v Fareham Town	L 0–5
1987/88	Preliminary Round	H Welton Rovers	D 2-2
	Replay	A v Welton Rovers	W 4–2
	1st Qualifying Round	A v Radstock Town	L 0–5
1988/89	Preliminary Round	A v Salisbury	L 2–4
1989/90	Preliminary Round	H v Bristol Manor Farm	D 2-2
	Replay	A v Bristol Manor Farm	L 1–3
1990/91	Preliminary Round	H v Eastleigh	W 2–1
	1st Qualifying Round	A v Trowbridge Town	L 0–3
1991/92	Preliminary Round	H v Horndeam	W 1–0
	1st Qualifying Round	A v Romsey Town	L 1–2
1992/93	Preliminary Round	A v Cinderford Town	L 0–3
1993/94	Preliminary Round	H v Lancing	W 6–1
	1st Qualifying Round	A v Maidenhead United	W 2–1
	2nd Qualifying Round	A v Dorchester Town	W 3–0
	3rd Qualifying Round	A v Newport IOW	L 2–4
1994/95	1st Qualifying Round	A v Fleet Town	W 1–0
	2nd Qualifying Round	A v Dorchester Town	L 2–4

=== FA Trophy ===
Season	Round	Opponents	Result
1994/95	1st Qualifying Round	H v Buckingham Town	D 0-0
	Replay	A v Buckingham Town	D 1-1
	2nd Replay	A v Buckingham Town	W 2–0
	2nd Qualifying Round	A v Forest Green Rovers	D 1-1
	”Replay"	H v Forest Green Rovers	W 2–1
	3rd Qualifying Round	A v Atherstone United	W 2–1
	1st Round	H v Rothwell Town	L 1–2

=== FA Vase ===
Season	Round	Opponents	Result
1974/75	Round 1	A v Brockenhurst	L 0–1
1975/76	Round 1	A v Winsor & Eton	L 0–2
1976/77	Preliminary Round	H v Thatcham Town	L 1–3
1977/78	Round 1	A v Sholing Sports	W 4–2
	Round 2	H v Hounslow	W 4–3
	Round 3	H v Gosport Borough	W 2–1
	Round 4	H v Burnham	L 0–1
1978/79	Round 1	A v Sholing Sports	W 1–0
	Round 2	A v Abingdon Town	W 3–1
	Round 3	A v Winsor & Eton	L 2–4
1979/80	Round 2	H v Fleet Town	W 3–1
	Round 3	H v Devizes Town	W 1–0
	Round 4	H v Almondsbury Greenway	W 2–1
	Round 5	A v Cray Wanderers	L 0–1
1980/81	Round 2	A v Farnham Town	W 1–0
	Round 3	A v Friar Lane Old Boys	L 3–4
1981/82	Round 2	A v Swanage Town & Herston	W 2–0
	Round 3	H v Brockenhurst	L 0–1
1982/83	Round 2	A v Sholing Sports	W 3–2
	Round 3	H v Eastleigh	L 2–4
1983/84	Round 2	A v Chippenham Town	W 2–1
	Round 3	H v Yate Town	W 3–1
	Round 4	H v Bristol Manor Farm	L 0–1
1984/85	Round 2	H v Exmouth Town	L 5–6
1985/86	Round 2	H v Exmouth Town	L 1–4
1986/87	Round 1	H v Supermarine	L 0–2
1987/88	Preliminary Round	H v Bashley	D 1-1
	Replay	A v Bashley	L 0–5
1988/89	Preliminary Round	H v Romsey Town	L 2–3
1989/90	Preliminary Round	A v Bicester Town	W 3–1
	Round 1	A v Headington Amateurs	D 1-1
	Replay	H v Headington Amateurs	W 1–0
	Round 2	A v Wimborne Town	W 2–0
	Round 3	A v Falmouth Town	L 1–2
1990/91	Preliminary Round	H v Bishops Cleeve	L 0–1
1991/92	Preliminary Round	H v AFC Totton	W 3–0
	Round 1	H v Eastleigh	W 3–0
	Round 2	A v Yate Town	L 0–3
1992/93	Preliminary Round	H v Romsey Town	W 6–2
	Round 1	A v Thatcham Town	L 2–4
1993/94	Preliminary Round	H Westbury United	W 4–1
	Round 1	H v Sandhurst Town	W 2–0
	Round 2	A v Chertsey Town	W 3–0
	Round 3	A v Bracknell Town	W 2–1
	Round 4	A v Canvey Island	W 2–1
	Round 5	A v Hinkley Athletic	W 3–0
	Quarter-Final	A v Taunton Town	L 0–2

== Successor clubs ==
Football soon returned to Faraday Road when in 1996 a new club, A.F.C. Newbury was formed. This new club was formed from three different local teams along with the ashes of the defunct Town club and took the place of the ambitious Ecchinswell in Division 1 of the Hampshire League and within a year had won promotion to the Wessex League where they would enjoy great success. Sadly 10 years later history would repeat itself as they too would suffer badly from financial and ground problems and after being demoted from the league's top flight they folded and withdrew from the competition early in the 2006–07 season.

Football still continues at Faraday Road today as upon taking up residence in 2006, Reading League side Old London Apprentice FC changed their name to Newbury F.C. In 2007–08 they won promotion to Division 1 East of the Hellenic League. They have since taken the previous clubs youth sides under their umbrella and are ambitious to progress further.
