= List of Gloucester City A.F.C. seasons =

Gloucester City is an English football club currently based in Gloucester. The club are currently members of the National League North and are affiliated to the Gloucestershire County FA.

== Key ==
Top scorer and number of goals scored shown in bold when he was also top scorer for the division.

Key to league record

- Lvl = Level of the league in the current league system or, pre-war calculated level.
- S = Numbers of seasons
- Pld = Games played
- W = Games won
- D = Games drawn
- L = Games lost
- GF = Goals for
- GA = Goals against
- GD = Goals difference
- Pts = Points
- Position = Position in the final league table
- Overall position = Overall club position in the English league system
- Average home attendance = for league games only

Key to cup records

- Res = Final reached round
- Rec = Final club record in the form of wins-draws-losses
- EXPR = Extra Preliminary Round
- PR = Preliminary Round
- QR1 = Qualifying Round 1
- QR2 = Qualifying Round 2
- QR3 = Qualifying Round 3
- QR4 = Qualifying Round 4
- R1 = Round 1
- R2 = Round 2
- R3 = Round 3
- R4 = Round 4
- R5 = Round 5
- R6 = Round 6
- QF = Quarter-finals
- SF = Semi-finals
- RU = Runners-up
- W = Winners

== Seasons ==
Year	League														Cup competitions					Manager
Year	Division	Lvl	Pld	W	D	L	GF	GA	GD	Pts	Position	Leading league scorer		Average attendance	FA Cup		FA Trophy		Gloucestershire Senior Cup	Manager
Year	Division	Lvl	Pld	W	D	L	GF	GA	GD	Pts	Position	Name	Goals	Average attendance	Res	Rec	Res	Rec	Gloucestershire Senior Cup	Manager
1893–94	Bristol & District League Division 1	9	18	6	1	11	32	45	-13	13	8th of 10	Percy Stout & Frank Fielding	8	278	-		-		-	Henry T. Robins
1894–95	Bristol & District League Division 1	9	22	10	4	8	64	54	+10	24	5th of 12	Percy Stout & Frank Fielding	18	250	-		-		-	Henry T. Robins
1895–96	Western League Division 1	9	20	6	4	10	29	42	-13	16	7th of 11	Frank Fielding	15	-	-		-		-	Henry T. Robins
1897–98	Gloucester & District League Division 1	14	10	8	1	1	33	7	+26	17	1st of 6	Henry Porter	10	-	-		-		-	James G. Washbourn
1898–99	Gloucester & District League Division 1	14	12	6	4	2	30	9	+21	16	2nd of 7	Henry Sherwood & Henry Porter	7	-	-		-		-	Randolph Lewis
1899–00	Gloucester & District League Division 1	14	9	7	2	0	26	11	+15	16	1st of 6	W. Shaw	11	-	-		-		-	Randolph Lewis
1900–01	Gloucester & District League Division 1	14	10	3	1	6	12	18	-6	7	4th of 6	Henry Porter & Joe Wakefield	3	-	-		-		-	Randolph Lewis
1902–03	Gloucester & District League Division 1	14	8	1	4	3	10	16	-6	6	3rd of 5	Bert Parker	5	-	-		-		-	Henry W. Arkell & Henry Sherwood
1903–04	Gloucester & District League Division 1	14	12	9	1	2	37	12	+25	19	1st of 7	Fred Rust	15	-	-		-		-	Frank R. Crawley & Henry Sherwood
1906–07	Gloucester & District League Division 1	14	6	4	0	2	19	8	+11	8	2nd of 6	Norman Squier	7	-	-		-		-	Joseph E. Palmer
1907–08	Gloucester & District League Division 1	12	14	12	1	1	61	13	+52	25	1st of 8	Ronald Turner	17	-	-		-		-	Joseph E. Palmer
1908–09	Gloucester & District League Division 1	12	14	11	3	0	48	10	+38	25	1st of 8	William Jarman	17	-	-		-		-	Joseph E. Palmer
1909–10	Gloucester & District League Division 1	12	12	4	4	4	27	24	+3	10	4th of 7	William Jarman	5	-	-		-		-	Oliver J.A. Carter
1913–14	North Gloucestershire League Division 2	13	11	1	3	7	11	30	-19	5	7th of 7	Ernest Danks	3	-	-		-		-	Henry E.W. Barry
World War I
1921–22	North Gloucestershire League Division 2	13	14	5	2	7	39	38	+1	12	5th of 8	William Jarman	10	-	-		-		-	Lemuel A. Beddis
1922–23	Gloucestershire Northern Senior League	12	30	5	3	22	43	112	-69	13	14th of 16	G. Surman	13	-	-		-		-	Lemuel A. Beddis
1923–24	Gloucestershire Northern Senior League	12	30	5	7	18	40	74	-34	17	14th of 16	G. Surman	10	-	-		-		-	Lemuel A. Beddis
1924–25	Gloucestershire Northern Senior League	12	30	5	7	18	38	75	-37	16	15th of 16	Archibald Pitt	6	-	-		-		-	Lemuel A. Beddis
1925–26	Gloucester Northern Senior League	12	30	21	6	3	104	45	+59	48	2nd of 16	Archie Edwards	24	765	-		-		-	Lemuel A. Beddis
1926–27	Gloucester Northern Senior League	12	30	7	5	18	64	98	-34	17	13th of 16	Harry Perks	9	266	-		-		-	Lemuel A. Beddis
1927–28	Gloucester Northern Senior League	12	18	9	1	8	54	32	+22	19	5th of 10	C.H. Tucker	8	-	-		-		-	Lemuel A. Beddis
1928–29	Gloucester Northern Senior League	12	24	8	3	13	38	57	-19	19	9th of 13	Leslie Marler & George Applin	4	-	PR	1-0-1	-		-	Lemuel A. Beddis
1929–30	Gloucester Northern Senior League	12	22	6	9	7	38	39	-1	21	5th of 13	W. Taylor	9	-	-		-		-	Lemuel A. Beddis
1930–31	Gloucester Northern Senior League	12	22	13	3	6	63	50	+13	29	4th of 13	Jerry Causon	22	-	-		-		-	Lemuel A. Beddis
1931–32	Gloucester Northern Senior League	12	22	9	5	8	57	45	+12	21	6th of 14	Jerry Causon	22	-	-		-		-	Maurice Hukin
1932–33	Gloucester Northern Senior League	12	24	19	1	4	74	32	+42	39	2nd of 15	Jerry Causon	28	-	EXPRR	0-1-1	-		-	Maurice Hukin
1933–34	Gloucester Northern Senior League	12	26	18	4	4	72	27	+45	40	1st of 20	Jerry Causon	25	2000	-		-		-	Maurice Hukin
1934–35	Gloucester Northern Senior League	12	28	22	2	4	92	36	+56	46	2nd of 20	Jerry Causon	31	2500	-		-		-	Maurice Hukin
1935–36	Birmingham Combination	10	36	21	6	9	99	62	+37	48	4th of 20	Albert Shelley	38	1592	-		-		-	Maurice Hukin
1936–37	Birmingham Combination	10	38	13	6	19	69	81	-12	32	12th of 20	Albert Shelley	13	1050	-		-		F	Maurice Hukin
1937–38	Birmingham Combination	10	38	15	8	15	96	85	+11	38	13th of 20	Reg Weaver	58	1055	QR2	2-0-1	-		F	Maurice Hukin
1938–39	Birmingham Combination	10	38	16	12	10	73	61	12	44	8th of 20	Reg Weaver	29	1131	QR3	2-1-1	-		F	Albert Prince-Cox; Joseph Selby Thomas
World War II
1946–47	Southern Football League	4	34	8	1	23	57	120	-63	17	17th of 18	Cyril Dean	14	1621	QR1	1-0-1	–		F	Cyril Dean
1947–48	Southern Football League	4	34	8	6	20	45	78	-33	22	16th of 18	Cyril Dean	12	1653	PR	0-0-1	–		F	Cyril Dean
1948–49	Southern Football League	4	42	12	10	20	78	100	-22	34	18th of 22	Doug Hunt	18	2643	R1	6-1-1	–		F	Douglas Hunt
1949–50	Southern Football League	4	46	14	11	21	72	101	-29	39	18th of 24	Jackie Boyd	13	2973	R1	5-2-1	–		W	Douglas Hunt
1950–51	Southern Football League	4	44	16	11	17	81	76	+5	43	12th of 24	Jimmy Robertson	13	3241	R1	1-0-1	–		W	Douglas Hunt
1951–52	Southern Football League	4	42	19	8	15	68	55	+13	46	9th of 22	Syd Asher	12	3290	QR2	1-0-1	–		F	Douglas Hunt
1952–53	Southern Football League	4	42	17	9	16	50	78	-28	43	10th of 22	Wally Pullen	16	2298	PRR	0-1-1	–		W	Jimmy Buist
1953–54	Southern Football League	4	42	16	11	15	69	77	-8	43	9th of 22	Dusty Millar	15	3600	QR2	1-0-1	–		F	Jimmy Buist
1954–55	Southern Football League	4	42	16	13	13	66	59	+7	45	8th of 22	Bob Etheridge	17	2667	QR3	2-0-1	–		W	Harry Ferrier
1955–56	Southern Football League	4	42	19	9	14	72	60	+12	47	7th of 22	Phil Friel	14	3103	QR2	1-1-1	–		W	Harry Ferrier
1956–57	Southern Football League	4	42	18	8	16	74	72	+2	44	10th of 22	Rob Coldray	16	3650	QR2	1-0-1	–		F	Harry Ferrier
1957–58	Southern Football League	4	42	17	7	18	70	70	0	41	12th of 22	Mike Johnson	16	2400	QR1	0-0-1	–		W	Harry Ferrier
Southern Football League split into two sections.
1958–59	Southern Football League; North-West	5	34	12	6	16	50	65	-15	30	13th of 18; Relegated	Rob Coldray	15	2350	QR3	2-0-1	–		F	Harry Ferrier
Southern Football League restructured. The club did not qualified to be placed to the Premier Division.
1959–60	Southern Football League; Division One	6	42	13	9	20	56	84	-28	35	17th of 22	Rob Coldray	8	2700	QR1	0-0-1	–		F	Ollie Norris
1960–61	Southern Football League; Division One	6	40	7	7	26	40	102	-62	21	21st of 21	Andy Symington; Gerry Horlick	9	716	QR1	0-0-1	–		F	Maurice Hukin
1961–62	Southern Football League; Division One	6	38	6	4	28	46	104	-58	16	19th of 20	Jimmy Weston	7	587	QR2R	1-1-1	–		F	Maurice Hukin
1962–63	Southern Football League; Division One	6	38	9	11	18	42	78	-36	29	16th of 20	Gerry Horlick	16	1313	QR3	2-0-1	–		F	Ron Humpson
1963–64	Southern Football League; Division One	6	42	17	4	21	88	89	-1	38	15th of 22	Adrian Williams	21	1287	QR2	1-1-1	–		F	Tommy Casey
1964–65	Southern Football League; Division One	6	42	19	10	13	68	65	+3	48	9th of 22	Adrian Williams	14	2266	QR2	1-0-1	–		F	Tommy Casey
1965–66	Southern Football League; Division One	6	46	14	12	20	75	98	-23	40	18th of 24	Bobby Grant	16	913	QR3R2	2-2-1	–		W	Bobby Grant
1966–67	Southern Football League; Division One	6	46	18	6	22	69	83	-14	42	13th of 24	Herbie Johnson	17	792	QR2R	1-1-1	–		F	Cyril Williams
1967–68	Southern Football League; Division One	6	42	12	9	21	54	68	-14	33	16th of 22	Eddie Bell	9	749	QR2	1-0-1	–		SF	Harold Fletcher
1968–69	Southern Football League; Division One	6	42	25	9	8	100	53	+47	59	3rd of 22; Promoted	John Stevens	31	1634	QR3R	2-1-1	–		W	Ian McIntosh
1969–70	Southern Football League; Premier Division	5	42	12	9	21	53	73	-20	33	19th of 22	John Stevens	12	1140	QR1R	0-1-1	QR3	2-1-1	F	Dick Etheridge
1970–71	Southern Football League; Premier Division	5	42	6	10	26	34	81	-47	22	22nd of 22; Relegated	Willie Ferns	6	585	QR1	0-0-1	R1	3-1-1	W	Rob Coldray
1971–72	Southern Football League; Division One North	6	34	8	8	18	46	61	-15	24	14th of 18	Ken Blackburn	8	487	QR1	0-0-1	QR1	0-0-1	F	Ian McIntosh
1972–73	Southern Football League; Division One North	6	42	18	7	17	55	64	-9	43	9th of 22	Ronnie Bird	12	371	QR1R	0-1-1	QR1	0-0-1	F	Dick Etheridge
1973–74	Southern Football League; Division One North	6	42	10	6	26	52	81	-29	26	20th of 22	Glyn Davies	12	225	QR1R	0-1-1	PR	0-0-1	F	Bobby Etheridge
1974–75	Southern Football League; Division One North	6	42	13	8	21	55	75	-20	34	17th of 22	Glyn Davies	14	315	QR2	1-0-1	PR	0-0-1	W	Bobby Etheridge
1975–76	Southern Football League; Division One North	6	42	13	9	20	49	78	-29	35	17th of 22	Keith Wood	15	296	QR1	0-0-1	QR1	1-1-1	F	Bobby Etheridge
1976–77	Southern Football League; Division One North	6	38	18	4	16	70	81	-11	40	10th of 20	John Evans	24	261	QR1	1-1-1	QR2	1-1-1	F	Colin Moulsdale
1977–78	Southern Football League; Division One North	6	38	14	8	16	68	75	-7	36	13th of 20	Doug Foxwell	21	210	QR1R	0-1-1	QR1	1-0-1	F	Bob Mursell
1978–79	Southern Football League; Division One North	6	38	18	8	12	76	59	+17	44	7th of 20	Terry Patterson	12	245	QR1	1-0-1	PRR	0-1-1	W	Bob Mursell
Alliance Premier League created, The Premier Division was disbanded as most of the clubs left to join the new league, while the divisions One were renamed.
1979–80	Southern Football League; Midland Division	6	42	10	14	18	55	68	-13	32	18th of 22	Terry Patterson	13	245	PR	0-0-1	QR1R	1-2-1	W	Bob Mursell
1980–81	Southern Football League; Midland Division	6	42	19	6	17	82	72	+10	44	13th of 22	Dave Lewis	23	423	QR2	1-0-1	R1	3-0-1	F	Bobby Campbell
1981–82	Southern Football League; Midland Division	6	42	21	9	12	64	48	+16	51	5th of 22	Dave Lewis	18	374	QR2	2-0-1	R1	3-0-1	W	Bobby Campbell
Southern Football League Premier Division recreated, the club qualified to be placed to the Premier Division.
1982–83	Southern Football League; Premier Division	6	38	13	12	13	61	57	+4	51	11th of 20	Mike Bruton	17	434	QR2	1-0-1	R1	1-0-1	W	Bob Mursell
1983–84	Southern Football League; Premier Division	6	38	13	15	10	55	50	+5	54	9th of 20	Mike Bruton	15	407	QR3	2-0-1	R1R	1-3-1	W	Bob Mursell
1984–85	Southern Football League; Premier Division	6	38	10	6	22	49	74	-25	36	18th of 20; Relegated	Kim Casey	23	405	QR3	1-0-1	R1	1-0-1	F	Tony Freely
1985–86	Southern Football League; Midland Division	7	40	15	12	13	61	57	+4	57	9th of 21	KC Truswell	14	290	QR1R2	0-2-1	QR3	0-0-1	SF	Steve Scarrott
1986–87	Southern Football League; Midland Division	7	38	19	5	14	77	59	+18	62	7th of 20	Steve Baddock	23	398	PRR	0-1-1	QR1	0-0-1	F	Steve Scarrott
1987–88	Southern Football League; Midland Division	7	42	18	14	10	86	62	+24	68	7th of 22	Chris Hyde	17	479	QR1	1-0-1	R1	3-0-1	SF	Brian Godfrey
1988–89	Southern Football League; Midland Division	7	42	28	8	6	95	37	+48	92	1st of 22; Promoted	Chris Townsend; Shaun Penny	23	765	QR3	2-0-1	QR3R	2-1-1	SF	Brian Godfrey
1989–90	Southern Football League; Premier Division	6	42	17	11	14	80	68	+12	62	9th of 22	Chris Townsend	22	686	R2R	5-2-1	QR3	2-0-1	SF	Brian Godfrey
1990–91	Southern Football League; Premier Division	6	42	23	14	5	86	49	+37	83	2nd of 22	Jason Eaton	16	947	QR4	0-0-1	R3	5-2-1	W	Brian Godfrey
1991–92	Southern Football League; Premier Division	6	42	15	9	18	67	70	-3	54	12th of 21	Jason Eaton	15	586	QR2	1-0-1	R1	0-0-1	F	Steve Millard
1992–93	Southern Football League; Premier Division	6	40	14	11	15	66	68	-2	53	13th of 21	Karl Bayliss	19	477	QR1	0-0-1	QR2R	0-3-1	W	Brian Godfrey
1993–94	Southern Football League; Premier Division	6	42	17	6	19	55	60	-5	57	10th of 22	Karl Bayliss	18	530	QR1	0-0-1	QR3	0-0-1	F	Brian Godfrey
1994–95	Southern Football League; Premier Division	6	42	22	8	12	76	48	+28	74	4th of 22	Mark Hallam	15	877	QR4R	3-1-1	QR3	2-0-1	QF	John Murphy
1995–96	Southern Football League; Premier Division	6	42	21	8	13	65	47	+18	71	4th of 22	Paul Milsom	10	821	QR2	1-0-1	R2	2-0-1	W	John Murphy
1996–97	Southern Football League; Premier Division	6	42	21	10	11	81	56	+25	73	3rd of 22	Dale Watkins	23	976	QR2	1-0-1	SFR	5-3-1	F	Leroy Rosenior
1997–98	Southern Football League; Premier Division	6	42	16	11	16	57	57	+0	59	11th of 22	Andy Mainwaring	16	616	QR4R	3-1-1	R3R	1-3-1	SF	Leroy Rosenior
1998–99	Southern Football League; Premier Division	6	42	18	11	13	57	52	+5	65	6th of 22	Adie Mings	11	586	QR4	2-0-1	R2	1-0-1	F	Leroy Rosenior; Brian Hughes
1999–00	Southern Football League; Premier Division	6	42	8	14	20	40	82	-42	38	20th of 22; Relegated	Jimmy Cox	11	497	QR3	1-1-1	R2	1-0-1	QF	Brian Hughes; Tommy Callinan
2000–01	Southern Football League; Western Division	7	42	12	11	19	76	84	-8	47	12th of 22	Jimmy Cox	20	252	QR4R	4-2-1	R1	0-0-1	QF	Tommy Callinan
2001–02	Southern Football League; Western Division	7	40	14	10	16	48	63	-15	52	14th of 21	Andy Hoskins	10	275	PR	0-0-1	R1	0-0-1	QF	Chris Burns
2002–03	Southern Football League; Western Division	7	42	22	9	11	87	58	+29	75	5th of 22	Jimmy Cox	18	298	QR2R	2-1-1	QF	6-4-1	QF	Chris Burns
2003–04	Southern Football League; Western Division	7	40	24	7	9	77	46	+31	79	2nd of 21	Andy Hoskins	28	394	QR4	4-1-1	R2	2-1-1	QF	Chris Burns
Conference North and Conference South, a new sixth tier divisions created, the club qualified to be transferred to the Premier Division.
2004–05	Southern Football League; Premier Division	7	42	12	17	13	63	61	+2	53	15th of 22	Dave Wilkinson; Jimmy Cox	11	403	QR1	0-0-1	R1	0-0-1	QF	Chris Burns
2005–06	Southern Football League; Premier Division	7	42	14	10	18	57	60	-3	52	13th of 22	Luke Corbett	12	359	QR1R	0-1-1	QR1	0-0-1	QF	Chris Burns; Tim Harris
2006–07	Southern Football League; Premier Division	7	42	15	13	14	67	70	-3	58	10th of 22	Alex Sykes	14	377	QR2	1-1-1	QR3	1-2-1	R1	Tim Harris
2007–08	Southern Football League; Premier Division	7	42	19	11	12	81	50	+31	68	6th of 22	Alex Sykes	16	302	QR2	1-0-1	R1	3-2-1	R1	Tim Harris
2008–09	Southern Football League; Premier Division	7	42	21	12	9	80	45	+35	75	3rd of 22; Promoted	Alex Sykes	21	284	QR1	0-0-1	QR2	1-0-1	F	David Mehew
2008–09	Southern Football League; Premier Division	7	Promoted after winning the play-offs.												QR1	0-0-1	QR2	1-0-1	F	David Mehew
2009–10	Conference North	6	40	12	6	22	47	59	-12	42	18th of 21	Lee Smith	18	313	QR4R	2-1-1	QR3	0-0-1	F	David Mehew
2010–11	Conference North	6	40	14	5	21	49	63	-14	47	14th of 21	Darren Edwards	15	361	QR2	0-0-1	R3	3-1-1	R2	David Mehew
2011–12	Conference North	6	42	15	7	20	53	60	-13	52	14th of 22	Darren Edwards	18	330	QR4R	2-1-1	QR3R	0-1-1	R1	David Mehew
2012–13	Conference North	6	42	16	6	20	54	63	-9	54	11th of 22	Darren Edwards	10	334	R1	3-0-1	QR3	0-0-1	R1	David Mehew
2013–14	Conference North	6	42	11	11	20	64	77	-13	44	17th of 22	Charlie Griffin	9	344	R1	3-2-1	R1	1-0-1	R1	David Mehew
2014–15	Conference North	6	42	14	10	18	63	75	-12	52	14th of 22	Charlie Griffin	9	429	QR4	2-2-1	QR3R	0-1-1	R1	David Mehew; Tim Harris
Fifth and sixth tier divisions renamed.
2015–16	National League North	6	42	12	14	16	39	49	-10	50	15th of 22	Lewis Hall; Joe Parker	5	443	QR4	2-0-1	QR3R	0-1-1	R1	Tim Harris
2016–17	National League North	6	42	18	10	14	69	61	8	64	10th of 22; Transferred	Luke Hopper	19	494	QR3R	1-1-1	QR3	0-0-1	R1	Tim Harris
2017–18	National League South	6	42	15	8	19	56	70	-14	53	14th of 22	Joe Parker	13	284	QR2	0-0-1	QR3	0-0-1	F	Tim Harris; Marc Richards
2018–19	National League South	6	42	12	11	19	35	54	-19	47	17th of 22; Transferred	Jake Jackson	8	342	QR4	2-1-1	QR3	0-0-1	R2	Chris Todd; Mike Cook
2019–20	National League North	6	30	9	6	15	39	57	-18	33	17th of 22	Joe Hanks	10	421	QR3R	1-0-1	QR3	0-0-1	R1	Mike Cook; James Rowe
2019–20	National League North	6	The regular season was cut short due to COVID-19, final league positions decided by points-per-game												QR3R	1-0-1	QR3	0-0-1	R1	Mike Cook; James Rowe
2020–21	National League North	6	18	10	5	3	36	22	+14	35	1st of 22	Matt McClure	12	– (Note: COVID-19 prevented fans from attending games)	QR2	0-0-1	R4	2-0-1	R1	James Rowe; Paul Groves
2020–21	National League North	6	The season was declared null and void due to COVID-19												QR2	0-0-1	R4	2-0-1	R1	James Rowe; Paul Groves
2021–22	National League North	6	42	10	16	16	47	60	-13	46	17th of 22	Ollie Hulbert	9	1190	QR3	1-0-1	R3	1-0-1	R1	Lee Mansell
2022–23	National League North	6	46	19	11	16	75	68	+7	68	7th of 24	Kieran Phillips	15	945	QR3	1-0-1	R3	0-0-2	R1	Steven King
2022–23	National League North	6	Lost in the play-off quarter-final.												QR3	1-0-1	R3	0-0-2	R1	Steven King
2023–24	National League North	6	46	9	9	28	49	89	-40	36	23rd of 24; Relegated	Brandon Smalley	9	918	QR2	0-0-1	R3	1-0-1	W	Tim Flowers; Mike Cook
2024–25	Southern League South	7	42	21	14	7	81	53	+28	77	4th of 22	Joe Hanks	23	1067	QR2	1-1-1	R1	0-1-1	QF	Mike Cook
2024–25	Southern League South	7	Lost in the play-off final.												QR2	1-1-1	R1	0-1-1	QF	Mike Cook
2025–26	Southern League South	7									TBD of 22				TBD		TBD			Daf Williams

== Notes ==
- Source: Gloucester City at the Football Club History Database
