= Brian Hughes =

Brian or Bryan Hughes is the name of:

- Brian Hughes (footballer, born 1937) (1937–2018), Welsh international footballer
- Brian Hughes (footballer, born 1962), former Swindon Town and Cheltenham Town footballer
- Brian Hughes (jockey) (born 1985), Irish jockey
- Bryan Hughes (born 1976), English footballer
- Brian Hughes (musician) (born 1955), smooth jazz guitarist
- Bryan Hughes (politician) (born 1969), Republican member of the Texas Senate from Mineola, Texas
- Bryan Desmond Hughes (1888–1918), Australian soldier and rugby union player
- Brian G. Hughes (1849–1924), US businessman and practical joker
- Bryan Tewell Hughes (born 1966), electronic music composer and producer of AeTopus
