= Michael Jackson (footballer, born 1980) =

English footballer

Personal information
- Date of birth: 26 June 1980 (age 46)
- Place of birth: Cheltenham, Gloucestershire, England
- Position: Midfielder

Youth career
- Charlton Rovers
- Cheltenham Town

Senior career*
Years	Team	Apps	(Gls)
1997–2002	Cheltenham Town	30	(0)
2001	→ Weston-super-Mare (loan)		
2002	Swansea City	1	(0)
2002	Bath City		
2002	Cirencester Town		
2002–2004	Weston-super-Mare		
2004–2008	Cirencester Town	145	(8)
2008–2013	Bishop's Cleeve	79	(1)
- * Club domestic league appearances and goals as of 19:27, 4 April 2010 (UTC)

Michael Jackson (born 26 June 1980) is an English former footballer who plays as a midfielder. He played in the Football League for both Cheltenham Town and Swansea City. He retired in Bishop's Cleeve in 2013.

== Career ==
Jackson played youth football for Charlton Rovers in his hometown of Cheltenham and at the age of 16 he was picked up by Cheltenham Town. He progressed through the youth team at Whaddon Road and featured for the first team in a Conference National game against Halifax Town in 1998. Jackson then featured for the Robins in the Football League.

In 2002, Jackson was sent out on loan by manager Steve Cotterill to non-league side, Weston-super-Mare. Jackson was then released by Cheltenham along with five other players.

In June 2002, after a successful trial, Jackson joined Welsh side Swansea City. Jackson made just a single appearance for Swansea as a substitute in a home win over Southend United. Jackson was released and returned to non-league football with Bath City in November 2002 when new Swansea City manager, Brian Flynn, revealed Jackson and two others were not part of his plans at the club.

As soon as Jackson joined Bath, he was loaned out to Cirencester Town to gain match fitness he had lost whilst on the sidelines at Swansea for a month. After a short spell with Bath, Jackson returned to Weston-super-Mare. This time however permanently and Jackson spent two years at Weston.

In the summer of 2004, Jackson returned permanently to Cirencester Town and was part of the Cirencester side that gained promotion to the Southern League Premier Division in April 2004. And Jackson went on to make over 100 appearances for the Centurions in a four-year spell at the club before eventually leaving in 2008 for rival Southern League side, Bishops Cleeve.

Jackson agreed a new deal with Bishop's Cleeve to keep him at the club for the 2012–13 season in June 2012. In May 2013, he became player/assistant manager to John Brough after the departure of Alex Sykes and his backroom team at the club.

Michael announced his retirement from playing in September 2013 due to work and played his last game for Bishops Cleeve against Didcot Town on 21 September
