= Meadow Park, Gloucester =

Football stadium in England

New Meadow Park
- Location of Meadow Park
- Location: Sudmeadow Road, Hempsted, Gloucester
- Coordinates: 51°51′36″N 2°15′47″W
- Owner: Eamonn McGurk and Alex Petheram
- Operator: Gloucester City A.F.C.
- Capacity: 4,000 (762 seats)
- Surface: 3G Artificial Turf

Construction
- Opened: 1986
- Renovated: 2020
- Cost: £4m
- Architects: Soldi Group and Roberts Limbrick Architects (2020 redevelopment)
- Builder: Soldi

Tenants
- Gloucester City (1986 – 2007 & 2020 –present); Truro City (2024)

Meadow Park is a football stadium in Hempsted, Gloucester. It has been home to Gloucester City A.F.C. from 1986 to 2007. It was destroyed by flooding in 2007 and was rebuilt, with the first game being held in September 2020.

== History ==
Meadow Park was not the first home of Gloucester City A.F.C., their previous venue was Horton Road Stadium from 1964 to 1986. The club officially moved to Meadow Park in 1986. In 1990, the stadium flooded after severe snowfall. It was submerged under 1.25 m (4.1 ft) of water when the snow melted, which meant the ground couldn't be used for over a month. In December 2000, the River Severn flooded and submerged the stadium in 2 m (6.6 ft) of water, and the changing rooms were also flooded and ruined. The ground was out of commission for more than six weeks, after an environmental health inspection ruled that the ground wasn't fit for use due to the contamination of the water.

On 22 July 2007, in UK-wide floods, the stadium flooded and by the following morning the water was over 2.5 m (8.2 ft) deep. The entire pitch was swamped with the clubhouse, kitchen facilities, changing rooms and shop all being flooded. Due to previous flooding incidents, the club had been unable to obtain insurance so was now faced with a large clean-up bill. The club started a fund to pay for this appealing to fans for donations. Meadow Park had been in ruin since this date, with the club playing at various other grounds instead.

On 2 March 2024 Truro played a home game here against Taunton in the National League South, following a sustained period of pitch damage following a temporary move to Taunton Town the previous month. It was later confirmed that Truro would play their remaining home matches of the season at Meadow Park. Taunton Town would later play a home match at the ground on 3 April 2024, following a waterlogged pitch at Wordsworth Drive earlier in the day; this change in venue was decided by the National League to ensure that the season would be able to conclude as scheduled.

== New Meadow Park Stadium ==
In 2007, Gloucester City Council established a "Football Task and Finish Group" who evaluated several sites in the city before deciding that building a new stadium at Meadow Park was the best viable solution. In 2011, a planning application for a new stadium and industrial land was submitted but this was refused by Gloucester City Council in 2013.

In 2014, scaled down plans for a 4,000 capacity stadium with a 1,000 seat stand were submitted and approved by the council, albeit with 45 additional conditions imposed by the council. The aim was to have it built within 12 to 18 months however this never went ahead. In September 2016, variations to address the many conditions of the original planning permission were approved. These included allowing building work to start before the footpath was widened and bicycle parking was built. However, there was still little progress made on the actual building of the stadium other than ground preparation work.

On 14 September 2018, a telephone mast obstructing the ground was taken down. In October 2018, scaled down plans for a new 3,000 seater stadium were revealed as the original plan became too expensive to fund. This included two 250-seater stands, a covered terrace for 800 fans and plans to repair the existing Arriva House and Clubhouse. It also proposed to move the existing open terrace stand currently residing at Evesham, back to Meadow Park. In January 2019, the plans were submitted to the council to include two 350-seater stands. On 2 May 2019, planning permission was granted for the amended plans with the proposed stadium having a capacity of 4,000, despite concerns voiced by Gloucestershire Constabulary regarding emergency vehicle access to the site. The club moved to secure funding through The Football Stadia Improvement Fund. In May 2019, the Football Association and National League granted the club permission to switch venues at any point in the 2019–20 season as soon as the new stadium is ready.

Final conditions for access to the Football Stadia Improvement Fund were agreed in November 2019, with construction of the new stadium commencing on 6 January 2020. To safeguard the renovated stadium from flooding in the future, the building works included raising the surface level of the pitch, stands and clubhouse 3.5 metres from the level of the old Meadow Park. The first game at the new stadium was held in September 2020, when Gloucester City's U18 team played Cirencester Town in The FA Youth Cup. The game was played behind closed doors due to ongoing government restrictions to tackle the spread of COVID-19. Gloucester City A.F.C. resumed playing their home games at Meadow Park in December 2020.

== Naming Rights ==
In March 2022, the club signed a three-year naming rights sponsorship deal with TigerTurf and the stadium was renamed the TigerTurf Stadium until the end of the 2024-25 National League season.

The club commenced the 2025/2026 Southern League season without a stadium sponsor. The club referred to the stadium as New Meadow Park on various social media posts. In October of that season the club held a raffle with the main prize being the opportunity to name the stadium. Entries cost £1,000 with all entrants getting a pitch side advertising board as a minimum. KMM Energy Solutions won the raffle and the stadium will be known as the KMM Energy Solutions Stadium for the remainder of the season. The first game with the new name was a 3–2 win over Havant & Waterlooville on November 8.

== Transport ==
The stadium is located just off the A430, about a 15-minute walk to the south of Gloucester city centre. There is a small car park at the stadium with very limited on-street parking nearby. Those travelling by car are advised to park in city car parks such as the one at Gloucester Quays or find alternative on-street parking elsewhere.

The road network near the stadium can be busy on Saturday afternoons so it is recommended that visiting supporters allow plenty of time to get to the stadium.

It is generally advisable to utilise public transport when visiting the city and stadium. The city is served by Gloucester railway station and Gloucester Transport Hub which are both convenient access points to the city for visiting supporters.

Local bus routes run near the stadium with Stagecoach Group being the primary local service provider, although it is not worth using a bus service from the centre to the stadium.
