= Neil Mustoe =

English footballer

Personal information
- Full name: Neil John Mustoe
- Date of birth: 5 November 1976 (age 49)
- Place of birth: Gloucester, England
- Position: Midfielder

Team information
- Current team: Gloucester City

Youth career
- Manchester United

Senior career*
Years	Team	Apps	(Gls)
1995–1997	Manchester United	0	(0)
1997	Wigan Athletic	0	(0)
1997–2002	Cambridge United	99	(4)
2002–2003	Gloucester City	33	(0)
2003	Stevenage Borough		
2003–2004	Yeovil Town	2	(0)
2004–2015	Gloucester City	364	(9)

International career
	England U16	5	(?)

Managerial career
- 2021–: Tuffley Rovers
- * Club domestic league appearances and goals

Neil John Mustoe (born 5 November 1976) is an English former footballer who played as a midfielder. He last played for Conference North side Gloucester City. He first signed for City at the start of the 2002–03 season but left in January 2003 to join Stevenage Borough, and soon afterwards, Yeovil Town. He re-signed for the club in August 2003.

Born in Gloucester, Mustoe signed for Manchester United on leaving school in 1993 and subsequently earned Schoolboy International honours. He won the FA Youth Cup in 1995 while at Old Trafford, and became a professional soon afterwards, but Alex Ferguson never selected him for a first-team game and he joined Wigan Athletic in December 1997, later turning out for Cambridge United for four seasons, but was released in summer 2002 as part of cost-cutting measures following the ITV Digital collapse.

He became joint-caretaker manager of non-league Gloucester City, with Adie Harris, on 5 January 2006 following the resignation of Chris Burns until the appointment of Tim Harris from Merthyr Tydfil on 11 January 2006.

Mustoe captained his home town club to win the Southern Football League play-offs with a 1–0 win over Farnborough Town to earn promotion to the Conference North in May 2009. For the 2010–11 season Mustoe was appointed first-team coach, a position he held in addition to his playing duties.

On 21 December 2021, Mustoe was announced as interim manager of Hellenic League side Tuffley Rovers.

== Honours ==
=== Club ===
- FA Youth Cup: 1994–95

=== Individual ===
- Cambridge United Player of the Year: 1998–99
