= Thomas Rust =

English cricketer

Personal information
- Full name: Thomas Henry Rust
- Born: 3 March 1881; Gloucester, Gloucestershire, England
- Died: 9 August 1962 (aged 81); Tredworth, Gloucestershire, England
- Batting: Right-handed

Domestic team information
- Years: Team
- 1914: Gloucestershire

Career statistics
Competition	First-class
Matches	1
Runs scored	2
Batting average	1.00
100s/50s	–/–
Top score	2
Balls bowled	–
Wickets	–
Bowling average	–
5 wickets in innings	–
10 wickets in match	–
Best bowling	–
Catches/stumpings	–/–
- Source: Cricinfo, 15 February 2012

Thomas Henry Rust (3 March 1881 – 9 August 1962) was an English cricketer. Rust was a right-handed batsman. He was born at Gloucester, Gloucestershire.

Rust made a single first-class appearance for Gloucestershire against Lancashire at the Spa Ground, Gloucester, in the 1914 County Championship. Batting first, Gloucestershire made 155, with Rust being run out after scoring 2 runs. Lancashire responded by making 394 in their first-innings, while Gloucestershire were dismissed for 206 in their second-innings, with Rust being dismissed for a duck by Bill Huddleston. Lancashire won the match by an innings and 33 runs.

Rust also had a distinguished local football career, playing and captaining Gloucester City 62 times from 1898 to 1907, scoring 41 goals.

He died at Tredworth, Gloucestershire on 9 August 1962.
