= Curtis Hutson =

Curtis Hutson may refer to:

- Curtis Hutson (pastor) (1934-1995), American Independent Fundamental Baptist pastor and editor
- Curtis Hutson (footballer) (born 1994), Barbadian footballer
