= Bobby McCool =

Bobby McCool may refer to:

- Bobby McCool (footballer)
- Bobby McCool (politician)
