= David Mehew =

English footballer (born 1967)

Personal information
- Full name: David Stephen Mehew
- Date of birth: 29 October 1967 (age 59)
- Place of birth: Camberley, England
- Height: 5 ft 11 in (1.80 m)
- Position: Midfielder

Senior career*
Years	Team	Apps	(Gls)
1984–1985	Leeds United	0	(0)
1985–1994	Bristol Rovers	222	(63)
1994	Exeter City (loan)	7	(0)
1994–1995	Walsall	13	(0)
1995	Northampton Town	0	(0)
- Yate Town
- Bath City
- Farnborough Town
- Rushden & Diamonds
- Forest Green Rovers
- Bath City
- Clevedon Town
- Paulton Rovers
- Brislington
- Weston-super-Mare
- Bitton
- Bristol Manor Farm
- Gloucester City

International career
1983	England U16		

Managerial career
- 2008–2014: Gloucester City
- 2015–2017: Mangotsfield United
- * Club domestic league appearances and goals

David Stephen Mehew (born 29 October 1967) is an English former professional footballer who played in the Football League for Bristol Rovers, Exeter City and Walsall. He previously managed Gloucester City and Mangotsfield United.

== Playing career ==
He began his career at Leeds United, before moving to Bristol Rovers. He had a loan spell at Exeter City and later moved on to Walsall and Northampton Town before dropping down to non-league football.

In 1999, he represented Forest Green Rovers in the FA Trophy final at Wembley. Finishing his playing career at Nicholas Wanderers with Lee Rose (UTW)

== Managerial career ==
Mehew worked as manager at Gloucester City between 2008 and 2014 having previously been assistant boss to Tim Harris at the club. He led them to promotion through the Southern Football League play-offs in May 2009 and took them into the first round proper of the FA Cup for the first time in 20 years where they lost to Football League One side Leyton Orient on 14 November 2012. On 22 February 2014, his time with the club came to an end after he was sacked following a league game with North Ferriby United.

In April 2014, he rejected a job offer to become manager at Cinderford Town. In July 2014, he was appointed as assistant manager at Mangotsfield United. However, in October 2015 it was announced that he had left his role at the club. A month later however he returned to Mangotsfield, this time as manager with Steve Elliott appointed as his assistant.

== Personal life ==
Mehew had two sons who played in the youth academy of Bristol Rovers. Tom currently plays for Chippenham Town and Olly plays for Merthyr Town.

== Honours ==
Bristol Rovers

- Football League Third Division: 1989–90
- Associate Members' Cup runner-up: 1989–90
