= Roddy Grant (footballer) =

English footballer

Personal information
- Full name: Roderick John Grant
- Date of birth: 16 September 1966 (age 60)
- Place of birth: Gloucester, England
- Position: Forward

Youth career
- Strathbrock

Senior career*
Years	Team	Apps	(Gls)
1986–1989	Cowdenbeath	64	(27)
1989–1992	St Johnstone	120	(32)
1992–1993	Dunfermline Athletic	32	(4)
1993–1995	Partick Thistle	60	(18)
1995–2000	St Johnstone	122	(34)
1999–2000	→ Ayr United (loan)	13	(2)
2000–2003	Brechin City	84	(40)
2003–2004	Peterhead	7	(0)
2004	Linlithgow Rose		
2004-2005	Pumpherston		
Total		502	(157)
- * Club domestic league appearances and goals

Roderick John Grant (born 16 September 1966) is an English former professional footballer. He played for seven clubs during a 19-year playing career, beginning as a trainee with Cowdenbeath in 1989 and closing out his professional career with Peterhead in the 2003/2004 season.

He played for East Calder C.F.C. as a child before turning professional.

Prior to becoming a full-time footballer, Grant was a stonemason. He is best known for his two spells with St Johnstone, during the former of which he scored Saints' second goal in a 3–1 win at home to Airdrie, securing promotion into the Premier Division.

Grant played in his testimonial match against Coventry on 12 November 1999.

Grant moved into junior football with Linlithgow Rose, playing for them until midway through the 2004/05 season. He finished the season with Pumpherston, where he became assistant manager to Steve Pittman at Recreation Park. In the summer of 2008 Grant gained a coaching role at Stirling Albion. Grant was appointed assistant manager at Stirling in the summer of 2010, before taking up a post with Perth & Kinross Council.

In November 2011 he was named as the administrator for Super Saints Lotto at his former club St Johnstone. Then, in July 2012, he became an associate director at the club.

Grant's father, Bobby, played for St Johnstone in the 1960s.
