= Luke Corbett =

English footballer (born 1984)

Personal information
- Full name: Luke John Corbett
- Date of birth: 10 August 1984 (age 42)
- Place of birth: Worcester, England
- Position: Forward

Senior career*
Years	Team	Apps	(Gls)
2003–2005	Cheltenham Town	1	(0)
2003	→ Cirencester Town (loan)	8	(6)
2003	→ Hednesford Town (loan)	7	(1)
2003	→ Chelmsford City (loan)	7	(2)
2004	→ Weston-super-Mare (loan)	8	(4)
2005	→ Bath City (loan)	9	(1)
2005	→ Weston-super-Mare (loan)	15	(6)
2005	Mangotsfield United	10	(1)
2005–2006	Gloucester City	33	(13)
2006–2008	Bishop's Cleeve	37	(20)
2008–2011	Leamington	133	(67)
2011–2012	Worcester City	?	(?)
2011–2012	Leamington (loan)	16	(0)
2012	Bedworth United	?	(4)
2012	Evesham United	?	(?)
2012–2013	Halesowen Town	?	(?)
2013	Evesham United	?	(?)
2015	Hanley Swan	?	(?)
- * Club domestic league appearances and goals

Luke John Corbett (born 10 August 1984) is an English footballer who plays as a striker. He is who plays for Hanley Swan.

== Career ==
Born in Worcester, he started his career at Cheltenham Town, where he made one senior appearance for the Football League outfit, before embarking on a non-league career. He signed for his boyhood club Worcester City in June 2011. He cemented this position by scoring a hattrick in a 4–0 victory over rivals Redditch United in the Worcestershire Senior Cup. However, he was unable to hold down a team place, and, after a loan spell back at Leamington, joined Bedworth United on a short-term deal in March 2012. In June, he switched to Evesham United. A brief spell with Halesowen Town followed, before he returned to Evesham in March 2013; his abrupt departure from Halesowen Town, having scored eight goals in 24 appearances for the club, had left the club's manager, John Hill, baffled.

In season 2015-16 Luke was playing for Hanley Swan in the Cheltenham Football League Division 2.
