= Geoff Morton =

English cricketer, footballer, umpire, and coach

Personal information
- Full name: Geoffrey Dalgleish Morton
- Date of birth: 22 July 1922
- Place of birth: Acton, London, England
- Date of death: 28 January 2000 (aged 77)
- Place of death: Malvern, Worcestershire, England
- Position: Goalkeeper

Senior career*
Years	Team	Apps	(Gls)
194x–1948	Chelmsford City		
1948–1951	Watford	107	(0)
1951–1952	Southend United	25	(0)
1953–1954	Gloucester City	11	(0)
1954–1955	Exeter City	6	(0)
- * Club domestic league appearances and goals

Geoffrey Dalgleish Morton (22 July 1922 – 28 January 2000) was an English professional footballer, cricketer, umpire and sports coach. He was best known for his achievements as a goalkeeper in the Football League, and as both a medium-fast bowler and umpire in first-class cricket, most notably the County Championship. He later served as a coach at Malvern College.

== Playing career ==
Morton was born in Acton, Middlesex. He won boxing competitions as a schoolboy, and also played football for his school, although not initially as a goalkeeper.

=== Football ===
British peacetime football was suspended in 1939, shortly after Morton turned 17. However, he played for Chelsea and Chelmsford City in wartime competitions. On the resumption of peacetime football, he stayed with Chelmsford, playing in the Southern League. Morton remained at the club until October 1948, when he signed for Football League Third Division South side Watford on a free transfer.

Morton made his Watford and Football League debut on 6 November 1948, in a 2–1 defeat to Exeter City. He quickly established himself as a regular in the team, missing only five of the remaining twenty-six matches. In the 1949–50 season, Morton was everpresent as Watford finished sixth in the league, and kept eight consecutive clean sheets between October and November 1949. He remained the club's first choice goalkeeper for the 1950–51 season, but financial difficulties forced the club to sell several other first team players, and the club finished 23rd out of 24 clubs in the league. Morton himself was sold to Southend United mid-way through the following season, for a fee of approximately £1,000, described as a "give-away" by the Watford Observer.

Morton played infrequently for Southend, as the club finished 8th and 16th in the Third Division South. He then played a season for Gloucester City, playing 11 times. He transferred to Exeter City at the start of 1954–55, but made only six league appearances, and retired from playing at the end of the season.

=== Cricket ===
Morton played for Middlesex as a right-arm, medium-fast bowler between 1949 and 1951, playing six minor counties matches for the Second Eleven, and two first-class matches at Lord's in the 1950 County Championship. He played a further first-class game for Marylebone Cricket Club in 1952. Morton did not take a wicket in first-class cricket, and scored one run from three innings.

After retiring as a player, Morton remained involved in cricket as an umpire, officiating a total of 13 first-class matches between 1954 and 1957. He continued to umpire at lower levels of cricket thereafter.

== Later life and death ==
Aside from cricket, Morton became a sports coach at Malvern College, where he taught for over 30 years. He died on 28 January 2000, aged 77.
