= Curtis Hutson (footballer) =

Barbadian footballer

Personal information
- Full name: Curtis Jay Jemmett-Hutson
- Date of birth: 14 August 1994 (age 32)
- Place of birth: Grangetown, Wales
- Position: Winger

Team information
- Current team: Bristol Manor Farm

Youth career
- 2007–2011: Cardiff City

Senior career*
| Years | Team | Apps | (Gls) |
| 2011–2012 | Port Talbot Town | 2 | (0) |
| 2012–2013 | Newport County | | |
| 2013–2014 | Cinderford Town | | |
| 2014–2015 | Barry Town United | | |
| 2015–2017 | Caerau (Ely) | | |
| 2017–2018 | Goytre United | | |
| 2018–2020 | Penybont | 23 | (5) |
| 2020–2021 | Barry Town United | 28 | (2) |
| 2021 | Redditch United | 13 | (2) |
| 2021–2023 | Merthyr Town | 54 | (10) |
| 2023–2024 | Pontypridd United | | |
| 2024 | Llanelli Town | | |
| 2024–2025 | Frome Town | | |
| 2025–2026 | Bishops Cleeve | | |
| 2026 | Pontypridd United | | |
| 2026– | Bristol Manor Farm | | |

International career
| 2007 | Wales U16 | 1 | (0) |
| 2023– | Barbados | 2 | (0) |
- * Club domestic league appearances and goals as of 17:06, 20 March 2023 (UTC)

Curtis Jay Jemmett-Hutson (born 14 August 1994) is a footballer who plays as a winger for Bristol Manor Farm. Born in Wales, he plays for the Barbados national team.

== Club career ==
Hutson joined Cardiff City's youth academy at the age of 13, and worked his way up their youth categories. A promising youngster, at the age of 15 he was diagnosed with epilepsy - he spent a year taking daily injections, gained weight and was prescribed lifelong medication.

He moved to Port Talbot Town in 2011, where he began his senior career. The following season, he moved to Newport County, before moving to England with Cinderford Town for a season. He returned to Wales in 2014, and had successive stints with Barry Town United, Caerau (Ely), Goytre United, Penybont and Barry Town United. At Penybont he was part of the unbeaten side that won the 2018–19 Welsh Football League Division One title. On 5 July 2021, he transferred to the English club Redditch United. He shortly after moved to the Welsh Southern Football League side on 4 November 2021.

In June 2026 he moved to Bristol Manor Farm.

== International career ==
Born in Wales, Hutson is of Barbadian descent through his father. At the age of 13, he was called up to play for the Wales U16s. He was first called up to the Barbados national team for a set of friendlies in June 2021. He debuted in a 1–0 loss to Cuba on 24 March 2023.

== Personal life ==
Hutson lost his father when he was 9 years old. He is a distant cousin of the Welsh former footballer Ryan Giggs through his mother.

== Honours ==
Penybont

- Welsh Football League Division One: 2018–19
