= Chris Burns (footballer) =

English footballer and manager

Personal information
- Date of birth: 9 November 1967 (age 58)
- Place of birth: Manchester, England
- Height: 6 ft 0 in (1.83 m)
- Position: Midfielder

Senior career*
Years	Team	Apps	(Gls)
- Brockworth Albion
- Sharpness
1988–1991	Cheltenham Town		
1991–1994	Portsmouth	90	(10)
1993	→ Swansea City (loan)	4	
1995	→ AFC Bournemouth (loan)	14	(1)
1995	Swansea City	5	
1995–1996	Northampton Town	66	(9)
1996–1999	Gloucester City	151	(23)
1999–2001	Forest Green Rovers	68	(5)
2001–2006	Gloucester City	160	(18)
2006–2008	Cinderford Town		
2008–2009	UD Horadada		
2009–2010	Cirencester Town		

Managerial career
- 2001–2006: Gloucester City (player-manager)
- Cinderford Town (player-manager)
- 2014: Bishop's Cleeve
- 2014–2018: Brockworth Albion (player-manager)
- 2020–: Stonehouse Town
- * Club domestic league appearances and goals

Chris Burns (born 9 November 1967) is an English former footballer.

Burns formerly played for UD Horadada, who compete in the Valencian Preferente in Spain, but in January 2009 left the club on mutual terms due to the economic down turn as the main board members, property developers Piensa, went into liquidation and forced Horadada to cut back dramatically.

Burns helped Portsmouth to the 1992 FA Cup semi final, but they lost on a penalty shootout to Liverpool.

Burns is currently manager of Hellenic League One West side Stonehouse Town. Burns is also signed on as a player for the Gloucestershire-based side.

In April 2014, Burns replaced John Brough as manager at Southern League side Bishop's Cleeve. However, he resigned from the role in June 2014. A month later he was named manager of Brockworth Albion.

In 2020, Burns was appointed manager of Stonehouse Town in the Hellenic League Division One West.
