= Brian G. Hughes =

American prankster

Brian G. Hughes (c. 1849–1924) was an American businessman and practical joker.

Hughes was a paper-box manufacturer and a vice-president, later president of the Dollar Savings Bank.

== Practical jokes ==
Once he "donated" a plot of ground in Brooklyn to the Board of Aldermen who planned to have it made a public park. It turned out to be a 2- x 8-foot plot of ground near 6th Avenue and 63rd Street. He also donated a mansion he claimed Marquis de Lafayette had lived in during the American War of Independence - actually a badly kept house at 147th Street and Concord Avenue in the Bronx. A local historical society tried to have him committed to an asylum for this prank.

Hughes might have been the first to drop fake diamonds in front of the Tiffany's jewelry store and watch greedy people try to grab them. This prank was later used as a film gag by the Marx Brothers. He placed empty picture frames and tools in front of the Metropolitan Museum of Art, which led to a search for apparently stolen paintings. He also distributed tickets to non-existent events.

He masqueraded as a Prince of Absdam, Cyprus and Aragon and pretended to hoist a title of Princess of the order of St Catherine of Mount Sinai to actress Lavinia Queen.

Hughes "forgot" expensive umbrellas in public places with an expectation that someone would try to take them. They were gimmicked to drop a banner that read "stolen from Brian G. Hughes" when they were opened.

Two of Hughes's hoaxes involved animal shows. He once bought an alley cat from a hobo, cleaned the animal up and entered it in a prestigious cat show as "Nicodemus, by Broomstick out of Dustpan by Sweeper, the last of the exotic Brindle breed". According to Hughes, the cat ate only chicken and ice cream. The cat won a ribbon, but the hoax was eventually exposed. Later, Hughes bought a retired trolley horse and entered it in a horse show as "Orphan Puldeca, out of Metropolitan by Electricity". The crowd was impressed by the horse's ability to respond to bells. The hoax was revealed when a judge deciphered the horse's name: Often Pulled the Car.

He claimed to have organized an expedition to South America to find a rare animal called the reetsa ("a steer" spelled backwards). According to Hughes, the animal had always avoided capture despite its habit of always walking backward. For over a month, reporters got "progress reports" from Hughes's "expedition". When he returned to New York, Hughes unveiled the animal by having it walk backward down the gangplank.

== Death ==
Hughes's obituary identified him as "the famous practical joker and banker".
