= James Rowe (footballer, born 1983) =

English footballer and manager

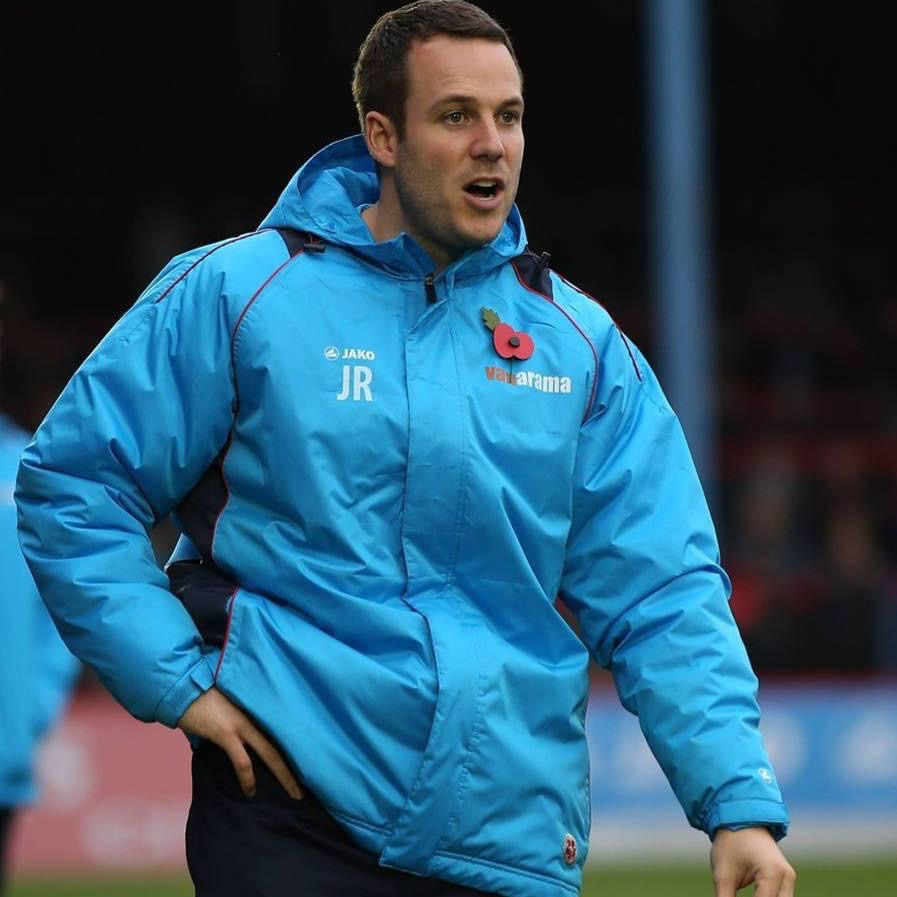
- Rowe in 2018

Personal information
- Full name: James Colvin Rowe
- Date of birth: 1983 (age 42–43)
- Place of birth: Ipswich, England
- Position: Forward

Youth career
- 1992–1995: Luton Town
- 1996–1999: Charlton Athletic

Senior career*
Years	Team	Apps	(Gls)
2001–2002	Ilkeston Town	6	(1)
2002–2004	Histon	58	(34)
2004	Heybridge Swifts		
2004	Stamford		
2005	Grantham Town		
2005	Rugby Town	3	(0)
2005	Histon		
2005–2006	Needham Market		
2006–2008	AFC Sudbury	105	(60)
2009	Leiston	22	(21)
2009–2010	Canvey Island	44	(28)
2010–2011	Leamington	28	(13)
2013	Canvey Island	4	(1)

Managerial career
- 2016–2019: Aldershot Town (assistant)
- 2019–2020: Gloucester City
- 2020–2022: Chesterfield
- 2022: AFC Fylde
- 2025: King's Lynn Town
- * Club domestic league appearances and goals

James Colvin Rowe (born 1983) is an English football manager and former player who was formerly the head coach of National League North club King's Lynn Town.

After starting his career on the books of Luton Town and Charlton as a youth player, Rowe moved down the divisions to Ilkeston Town for first team football, and subsequently played for Histon, Rugby Town, Needham Market, AFC Sudbury, Leiston, Canvey Island and Leamington.

Following retirement as a footballer, Rowe moved into management. First as an assistant with Aldershot Town, before moving on to manage Gloucester City, Chesterfield and AFC Fylde from which he resigned in September 2022.

== Early life ==
Rowe was born and grew up in Ipswich, Suffolk, where he attended St Joseph's College. He is the son of former football manager Colwyn Rowe.

In his youth he played for Luton Town and Charlton Athletic.

== Playing career ==
After being released by Charlton at age 18, Rowe joined Southern Football League Premier Division club Ilkeston Town. He subsequently joined Histon, where he scored 30 goals as an 18 year old, however, a serious knee injury interrupted Rowe's progress. In 2004, he joined Heybridge Swifts. Afterwards, he joined Stamford and Grantham Town for short spells. In July 2005 he joined Rugby Town. After being fined by the club for dissent he was released by mutual consent after three games. He returned to Histon, before joining Needham Market for the remainder of 2005–06. He signed with AFC Sudbury in 2006, where his father Colwyn played and was with them until the end of 2008.

In January 2009, he joined Leiston, where he scored 20 goals in his first 12 games. In July 2009, he joined Canvey Island. In 2010, he began working for Birmingham City in a part-time academy coaching role, which allowed him to continue to play, where he joined Leamington in 2010. He departed at the end of the season to work full-time with Birmingham. In 2013, following a gap in his playing career due to his coaching commitments, he rejoined former club Canvey Island, scoring once in four appearances.

== Managerial career ==
=== Youth coaching ===
Rowe retired from playing at age 27, moving into coaching. He joined Birmingham City, as the academy's head of education and coach for the U16 and U17 teams. He stayed at Birmingham for three years, before joining the Premier League as a coaching advisor, where he was responsible for providing technical reports on Academy teams across England and Europe. Afterwards, he joined West Ham United as assistant academy manager.

In 2015, Rowe left West Ham after having been disciplined for "poor practice" regarding young players. Following an internal investigation caused by complaints, he was ordered to undertake awareness training. He went to the Netherlands, where he attended the Johan Cruyff Institute in Amsterdam, earning a master's degree in coaching.

=== Aldershot Town (assistant) ===
In June 2016, Rowe was appointed assistant manager with National League club Aldershot Town under manager Gary Waddock, extending his contract a year later. Despite interest from League Two clubs, Waddock and Rowe remained at Aldershot, guiding them to two successive play-off positions in 2016–17 and 2017–18. Rowe left Aldershot in January 2019, by mutual consent.

=== Gloucester City ===
In November 2019, Rowe was appointed manager of sixth-tier National League North side Gloucester City, having been approached while at Aldershot 12 months earlier. After arriving at Gloucester, the team initially struggled before the season was shortly cancelled due to the COVID-19 pandemic. After making sweeping roster changes in the offseason and bringing in players whom he has previously worked with such as Akwasi Asante, they began the following season with an upset loss to ninth-tier Christchurch in the FA Cup on penalties, however, they were able to rebound quickly and began the 2020–21 National League North season with four consecutive league wins, equaling their best league start in 78 years, as well as eight wins through nine matches.

=== Chesterfield ===
In November 2020, he left Gloucester to become manager of National League club Chesterfield, signing a contract through the end of the 2022–23 season. In early 2021, his contract was extended through the summer of 2024, despite some interest from League Two clubs. On 12 April 2021, Rowe was awarded with the league's Manager of the Month award for the previous month as his side won six out of seven games, conceding zero goals in these wins. After joining the club while they were in 22nd place in the 23-team league through nine matches, Rowe ultimately guided Chesterfield to a sixth-place finish in his inaugural season, advancing to the promotion playoffs, but were defeated by Notts County. In October 2021, it was reported that Southend United made an official approach to recruit Rowe to become their new manager. Through his first 50 matches with Chesterfield, he led the club to a record of 30 wins, ten losses, and ten draws. In his first full year as manager, the club earned 101 points from 50 league games.

On 8 January 2022, Chesterfield played UEFA Champions League holders Chelsea in the third round of the FA Cup, with Chesterfield losing 5–1. According to BBC Sport, "Spirites' fans took over the entire Shed End and even as their team was predictably, and perfectly understandably, outclassed they were never silenced in support of manager James Rowe and his players."

On 24 January 2022, Rowe was suspended by Chesterfield pending an investigation into what was later disclosed as an allegation of sexual assault in November 2021. On 4 February 2022, Rowe left Chesterfield by mutual consent.

=== AFC Fylde ===
On 7 March 2022, Rowe was appointed manager of National League North side AFC Fylde, signing a three-year contract. On 28 September 2022, Rowe was charged with sexual assault, and on 29 September his resignation was accepted by the club. Fylde stated that due diligence had been done before his appointment.

=== King's Lynn Town ===
In May 2025, Rowe was appointed manager of the National League North side King's Lynn Town on a long-term agreement. On 24 September 2025, Rowe's resignation was accepted following an incident at the club's training ground. Rowe was said to have been headbutted in front of his own players.

== Personal life ==
As of 2024, Rowe has a partner, two sons and lives in Derbyshire. He has a Sports Science Master's degree from Nottingham Trent University and a UEFA A coaching license. In 2024, he completed a master's course in sports directorship, his third qualification of that level.

In November 2022, Rowe pleaded not guilty to the November 2021 allegation of sexual assault. He was found not guilty following a trial in October 2024.

In September 2025, Rowe was arrested by Norfolk Police on two counts of alleged sexual assault following his departure from King's Lynn Town. He was released on bail.

== Managerial statistics ==
As of match played 20 September 2025

Managerial record by team and tenure
Team	From	To	Record					Ref.
Team	From	To	P	W	D	L	Win %	Ref.
Gloucester City	19 November 2019	by 24 November 2020 (Note: Gloucester City A.F.C. confirmed on 24 November 2020 that Rowe had left the club and would not be taking charge of that day's game.)	24	10	5	9	41.67	(Note: Figures include one FA Cup match which Gloucester City lost on penalties; such matches are conventionally recorded as drawn.)
Chesterfield	26 November 2020	4 February 2022	64	36	16	12	56.25	(Note: Figures include two FA Trophy matches which Chesterfield won on penalties; such matches are conventionally recorded as drawn.)
AFC Fylde	7 March 2022	29 September 2022	26	15	6	5	57.69	
King's Lynn Town	23 May 2025	24 September 2025	10	4	4	2	40.00	
Total			124	65	31	28	52.42	

== Honours ==
=== Manager ===
Individual

- National League Manager of the Month: March 2021
