= Barton and Tredworth =

Area of Gloucester, England

Coordinates: 51°51′20″N 2°14′15″W

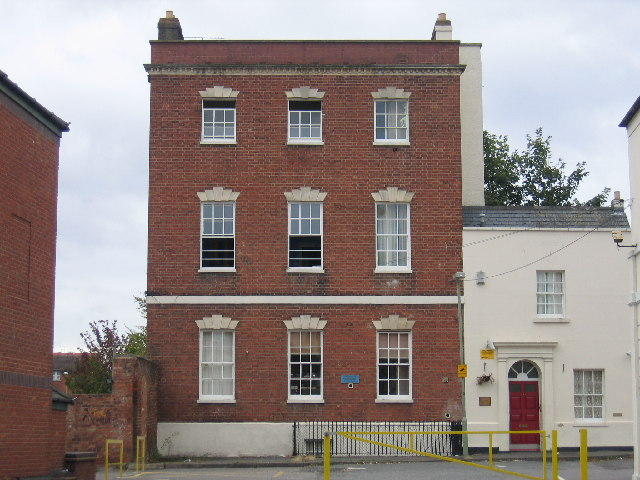
Richleigh, Barton Street, the former site of Sir Thomas Rich's School

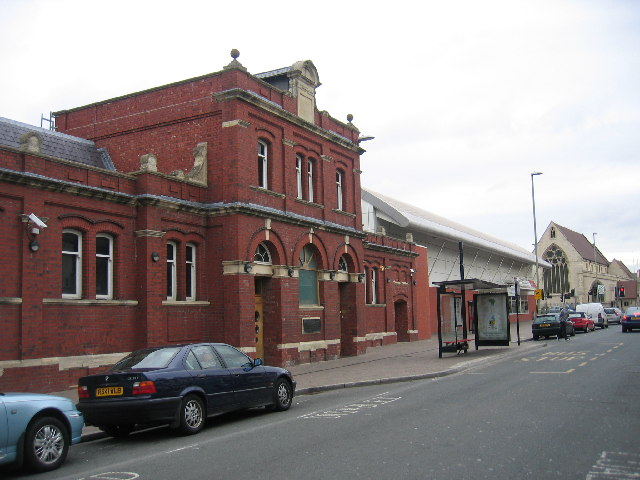
19th-century public baths, now a nightclub

Barton and Tredworth is an electoral ward of Gloucester, England that lies just outside the Eastgate of the city and covers the two districts with those names. The ward had a population of 12,006 at the 2021 census, an increase from the 10,953 recorded in 2011.

The ward is bounded in the northeast by the A4302 Metz Way, in the southeast by the railway, in the southwest by Tredworth Road, and in the northwest by Park End Road and the Trier Way inner ring road.

A variety of communities live in the area, and in 2023 it was reported that 70 languages were spoken. The ward elects three members of Gloucester City Council and is within the Gloucester constituency for Westminster elections.

A community website includes records of the memories of the people living in the area, past and present.

Barton has a tradition of electing a mock mayor.

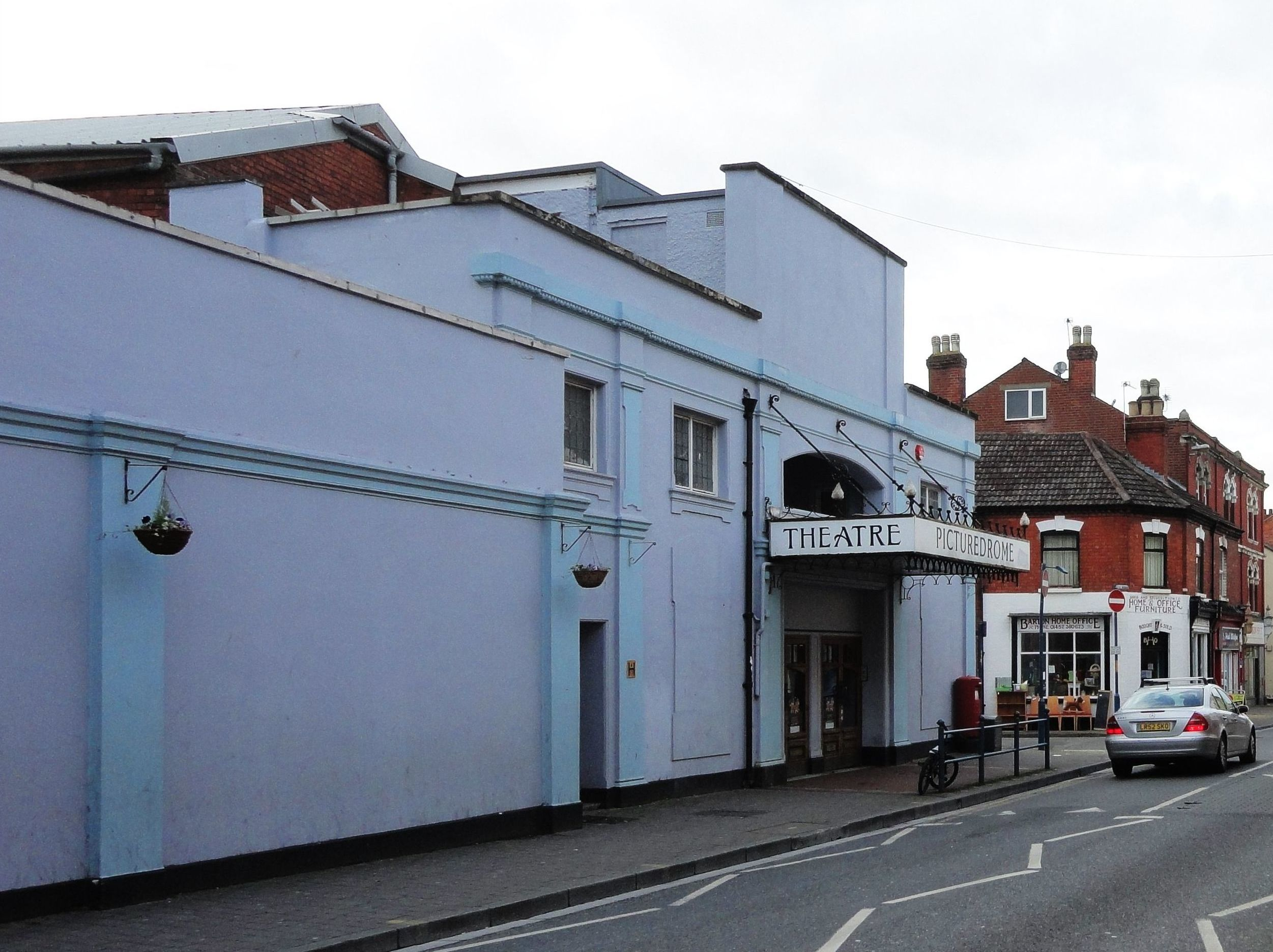
Olympus Theatre, Barton Street; opened in 1923 as the Picturedrome Cinema
