= Alex Sykes =

English footballer and manager (born 1974)

Personal information
- Date of birth: 2 April 1974 (age 52)
- Place of birth: Newcastle-under-Lyme, England
- Position: Midfielder

Team information
- Current team: Evesham United (assistant manager)

Youth career
- 1992–1993: Hereford United
- 1993–1994: Mansfield Town

Senior career*
Years	Team	Apps	(Gls)
1993–1994	Mansfield Town	2	(1)
1996–2000	Forest Green Rovers	204	(62)
2000–2002	Nuneaton Borough	46	(14)
2001	→ Forest Green Rovers (loan)	7	(2)
2002–2004	Forest Green Rovers	84	(9)
2003	→ Bath City (loan)	4	(0)
2004–2006	Bath City	50	(13)
2005	→ Gloucester City (loan)	6	(0)
2006–2009	Gloucester City	154	(60)
2009–2013	Bishop's Cleeve		(12)
2013–2016	Shortwood United		
2020–2021	Longlevens	1	(0)

International career
- England Schools under 18s
- England Futsal

Managerial career
- 2011–2013: Bishop's Cleeve
- 2013–2016: Shortwood United (joint-manager)
- 2016–2017: Shortwood United
- 2021–2023: Cinderford Town
- * Club domestic league appearances and goals

Alex Sykes (born 2 April 1974) is an English football manager and former professional footballer who played as a midfielder. He also played internationally for the England Futsal side. He is currently assistant manager of Evesham United.

== Career ==
Sykes was a product of the youth setups at both Hereford United and Mansfield Town. He had originally begun his career with Westfields who received a club record fee of £4,000 from Mansfield for his services in 1992. He made his senior debut for Mansfield in a Football League match against Walsall, scoring on his debut. He turned down the offer of a new contract from manager Andy King to attend university in Cheltenham at the University of Gloucestershire.

During this time he played for defunct Hellenic League club Endsleigh, and also for the reserves at Cheltenham Town. He signed for Forest Green Rovers in March 1996 and was part of their successful double league winning side that won back-to-back promotions into the Football Conference in 1998 under Frank Gregan.

In 1999, Sykes reached the final of the FA Trophy with Forest Green at Wembley Stadium but the club lost 1–0 against Kingstonian. He finished as top goal scorer in the competition that season and scored in the semi-final second leg against St Albans City.

He then joined fellow Conference side Nuneaton Borough, ruling out the opportunity to sign for Stevenage Borough. His first goal for Nuneaton Borough came on 28 August 2000 in a 4–2 away defeat against Morecambe. He helped the club to an FA Cup giant killing against Stoke City however he returned to Forest Green on loan in March 2001 until the end of the season. He made 7 appearances on loan back at Forest Green scoring 2 goals, the first of which again came against Morecambe in April 2001. He missed the club's 2001 FA Trophy final defeat against Canvey Island at Villa Park because he had been cup tied from playing for Nuneaton in a previous round.

Sykes returned to Nuneaton for the 2001–02 campaign but re-joined Forest Green permanently under the management of former England international Nigel Spink in January 2002. This was a swap deal with Lee Howey moving the other way. His two final goals for Nuneaton Borough came in one match on 18 September 2001 when his brace helped Nuneaton to a point in an away game against Doncaster Rovers. He made his third debut for the club in a 1–1 away draw against Dagenham & Redbridge on 19 January 2002. In November 2002, he featured in Forest Green's 0-0 FA Cup first round draw with Exeter City which was broadcast live on Match of the Day.

A loan move to Bath City in September 2003 saw Sykes gain match fitness and he joined Bath permanently in September 2004 after making his final Forest Green appearance in an away defeat against Halifax Town. He was a part of the Bath side who pulled off a cup shock beating Barnet away from home in the FA Cup first round in November 2004. That result saw Sykes feature in the second round where Bath lost 2–0 away to Football League side Peterborough United.

Sykes suffered from injury problems at Twerton Park and was loaned out to Gloucester City to play under his former manager at Forest Green, Tim Harris. He made his debut against Aylesbury United in December 2005 and played six times in his loan spell before returning to Bath. At the end of the season he was released by Bath and re-signed permanently for Gloucester.

He went on to make his second full debut against Maidenhead United in August 2006. He played a pivotal role in Gloucester's 2008–09 season as they gained promotion through the Southern League play-offs. Sykes scored 27 goals including a hat-trick at home to Mangotsfield United.

He spent a few months of the 2009–10 season with Gloucester City in the Conference North as well as a short loan spell at Shortwood United, before departing in December 2009 for Bishop's Cleeve to take on the role of player/assistant manager at Kayte Lane.

In October 2020, he came out of retirement at the age of 46 to sign for Hellenic Premier Division side Longlevens.

== Coaching ==
In May 2011, Sykes was appointed as manager of Bishop's Cleeve following the shock sacking of Paul Collicut. In his first season as manager, he led Bishop's Cleeve to the club's record high league finish of 11th in the Southern League South & West Division - the club's highest finish in its 107-year history. He also led the club to the final of the Gloucestershire Senior Cup where they lost against Bristol City at Ashton Gate. On the way to the final Bishop's Cleeve defeated the likes of Forest Green Rovers, Bristol Rovers and Cheltenham Town.

At the end of his second season as boss, in April 2013, Sykes stepped down from his role as manager at the club. Just a month later however, and it was announced that Sykes had become joint-manager at fellow Southern League club Shortwood United alongside John Evans. In October 2013, he helped lead Shortwood into the first round of the FA Cup for the first time in their history with an away fourth qualifying round replay win over Aldershot Town. The club went on to host Port Vale in a live televised clash in the first round on 11 November 2013 however suffered a 4–0 defeat. At the end of his first season as joint-boss at Shortwood, he helped lead the club to a 6th-place finish, ending the campaign just one point off the play-offs. He would eventually take sole charge of the club following the retirement of John Evans at the end of the 2015–16 season. After leading the side for the 2016–17 season, he left Shortwood in April 2017.

In January 2018, Sykes was appointed as assistant manager at Southern Premier Division side Redditch United, working under manager Tim Harris who he had played for at both Gloucester City and Forest Green Rovers. Following Harris's departure from Redditch in April 2018, Sykes also left the club.

In October 2021 he was appointed manager of Cinderford Town. In May 2023, he stepped down from his manager position and was later appointed assistant manager of Evesham United.

== International ==
Sykes is a former England Futsal international. He captained his country and scored a hat-trick against Cyprus in May 2006 in a 5–5 draw, this was England's first Futsal international where they avoided defeat. In February 2008, he participated in the Kuala Lumpur World 5's competition. In September 2013, he returned to futsal, signing for the UoG Futsal Club.

== Honours ==
As a player
Forest Green Rovers

- Southern League Premier Division champion: 1997-98
- Southern League Southern Division champion: 1996-97
- FA Trophy runner up: 1998-99

Gloucester City

- Southern League Premier Division play-off winner: 2008-09
- Gloucestershire Senior Cup runner up: 2008–09, 2009–10

Bath City

- Southern League Premier Division play-off runner up: 2005-06

As a manager

Bishop's Cleeve

- Gloucestershire Senior Cup runner up: 2011-12

Shortwood United

- Gloucestershire Senior Cup runner up: 2014-15
