= Bobby McCool (footballer) =

Scottish footballer (1942–2019)

Robert McCool
Personal information
- Date of birth: 11 August 1942
- Place of birth: Edinburgh, Scotland
- Date of death: 22 March 2019 (aged 76)
- Position: Winger

Youth career
- Rangers

Senior career*
Years	Team	Apps	(Gls)
19??–1960	Ormiston Primrose		
1960–1961	Third Lanark	3	
1961–1962	Hamilton Steelers		
1962–1965	Cheltenham Town		(30)
1965–1975	Gloucester City	296	(57)
- Bishops Cleeve
- * Club domestic league appearances and goals

Robert McCool (11 August 1942 in Edinburgh – 22 March 2019) was a Scottish footballer who played for Third Lanark, Cheltenham Town and Gloucester City.

== Playing career ==
McCool started as a junior at Rangers before joining Third Lanark in February 1960 from Ormiston Primrose. McCool made his debut for Third Lanark aged just 17 but a badly injured ankle resulted in him only making three first team appearances for the club. A spell in Canada with Hamilton Steelers was brief as he was homesick and returned to the UK. He turned down Dunfermline Athletic and Hastings United to sign for Cheltenham Town in 1962. McCool scored 30 goals in toal for Cheltenham Town. In 1965, McCool left Cheltenham Town and joined neighbours Gloucester City where he stayed until 1975, being voted player of the year twice in 1966/67 and 1967/68.

After leaving Gloucester City he briefly turned out for Bishops Cleeve.

McCool died on 22 March 2019.
