= Bobby Campbell (footballer, born 1922) =

Scottish footballer and manager

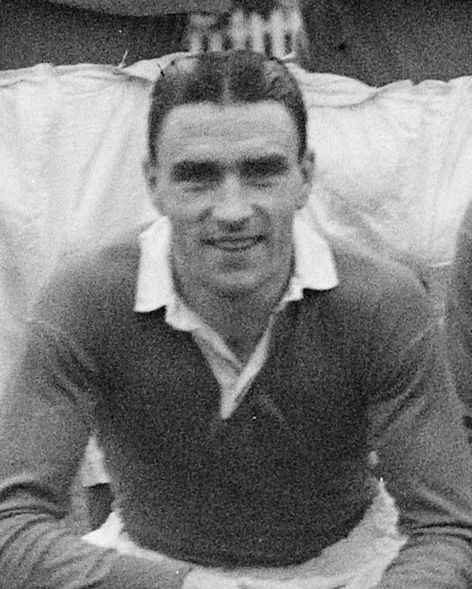
- Campbell in a Chelsea team photo, November 1947

Personal information
- Full name: Robert Inglis Campbell
- Date of birth: 28 June 1922
- Place of birth: Glasgow, Scotland
- Date of death: 4 May 2009 (aged 86)
- Place of death: Bristol, England
- Position: Winger

Senior career*
Years	Team	Apps	(Gls)
–	Glasgow Perthshire		
1941–1947	Falkirk	16	(6)
1947–1954	Chelsea	188	(36)
1954–1958	Reading	94	(12)
Total		298	(54)

International career
1947–1950	Scotland	5	(1)

Managerial career
- 1961–1962: Dumbarton
- 1977–1979: Bristol Rovers
- 1980–1982: Gloucester City
- * Club domestic league appearances and goals

Robert Inglis Campbell (28 June 1922 – 4 May 2009) was a Scottish footballer, who played during the 1940s and 1950s. He was born in Glasgow.

A winger, Campbell's playing career consisted of spells with Falkirk, Chelsea (departing after seven years at the club, one season prior to their 1954–55 Football League win) and Reading. He also played for Queens Park Rangers as a "guest" during the Second World War. He won five caps for the Scotland national team between 1947 and 1950. He scored his only Scotland goal against Switzerland in April 1950.

Upon retiring Campbell became a coach with Reading, before taking the manager's position at Dumbarton in 1961. He left Boghead Park a year later and assumed a scouting role with Bristol Rovers for the next 15 years. He was promoted to manager of the Gasheads in November 1977, leaving in December 1979. His last managerial appointment was with Gloucester City.
