= Bobby Grant (footballer, born 1940) =

Scottish footballer

Robert Grant
Personal information
- Full name: Robert Grant
- Date of birth: 25 September 1940
- Place of birth: Edinburgh, Scotland
- Date of death: February 2017 (aged 76)
- Place of death: Spain
- Position: Inside forward

Senior career*
Years	Team	Apps	(Gls)
- Ormiston Primrose
1959–1960	Rangers	1	(0)
1960–1961	Leyton Orient	0	(0)
	Stirling Albion		(0)
1961–1962	St Johnstone	3	(0)
1962–1963	Carlisle United	2	(1)
1963–1964	Chelmsford City		
1964–1965	Cheltenham Town		
1965–1967	Gloucester City		
	Queen of the South		(0)
1966–1968	Newtongrange Star		

Managerial career
- 1965–1966: Gloucester City
- * Club domestic league appearances and goals

Robert Grant (25 September 1940 – February 2017) was a Scottish footballer who played as an inside forward.

== Career ==
Grant began his career at Ormiston Primrose, before signing for Rangers in 1959. On 27 April 1960, Grant made his only appearance for Rangers, in a 4–1 defeat to away to Clyde. In 1961, Grant signed for St Johnstone, making three Scottish Football League appearances during his time at the club. In 1962, Grant moved to England, signing for Carlisle United. Grant made two English Football League appearances for the club, scoring once. After a spell at Carlisle, Grant dropped into non-league, playing for Chelmsford City and Cheltenham Town. In 1965, Grant signed for Gloucester City, taking up a player-manager role. Grant made 100 appearances in all competitions, scoring 36 times. Following the culmination of his spell at Gloucester, Grant moved back up to Scotland, playing for Queen of the South and Newtongrange Star.

== Personal life ==
Grant's son, Roddy, was also a footballer for St Johnstone.
