= Mike Cook (footballer) =

English professional footballer

Personal information
- Full name: Michael John Cook
- Date of birth: 18 October 1968 (age 58)
- Place of birth: Stroud, England
- Height: 5 ft 11 in (1.80 m)
- Position: Midfielder

Youth career
- Wolverhampton Wanderers
- ?–1985: Coventry City

Senior career*
Years	Team	Apps	(Gls)
1985–1989	Coventry City	0	(0)
1987	→ York City (loan)	6	(1)
1989–1991	Cambridge United	17	(1)
1990	→ York City (loan)	6	(0)
1990–1991	Wycombe Wanderers	?	(?)
1993–1994	Corby Town	?	(?)
2001–2003	Gloucester City	12	(0)

Managerial career
- 2004–2006: Cinderford Town
- 2019: Gloucester City
- 2020–2022: Chippenham Town
- 2023: Swindon Town Women
- 2023–2025: Gloucester City
- * Club domestic league appearances and goals

Michael John Cook (born 18 October 1968) is an English manager and former professional footballer.

In his playing career, Cook played in the Football League as a midfielder for York City and Cambridge United, after starting his career with an FA Youth Cup win with Coventry City

In December 2019 he appeared in court on allegations of dangerous driving. He pleaded guilty to careless driving in February 2020 and was banned from driving due to the number of points he had accrued.

== Career ==
Born in Stroud, Gloucestershire, Cook started his career in the youth team at Coventry City where he won an FA Youth Cup medal. After a brief spell on loan to York City he signed for Cambridge United on a free transfer in 1989.

Cook's career at the Abbey Stadium was blighted by injury; he made only 17 appearances in two seasons. His one goal for the club was a vital one however, scoring at Aldershot to help cement a play-off place at the end of the 1989–90 season. He was also a substitute at Wembley Stadium for the 1–0 win over Chesterfield in the final.

After another loan spell at York City, a spinal injury forced Cook's retirement from the professional game at the age of 22. He had spells in non-League football with Wycombe Wanderers, Corby Town, Cambridge City, and many other clubs, and worked for Cambridge United as Football in the Community officer. Cook took up a similar post at Cheltenham Town in 1999, alongside spells as assistant manager of Gloucester City and, from September 2004, as manager of Cinderford Town. After ten years with Cheltenham, Cook joined the staff of the Professional Footballers' Association in July 2009 as a regional coach educator.

On 8 January 2019 Cook became the manager of Gloucester City, replacing Chris Todd as manager. He was sacked from this role in November 2019.

In January 2020, Cook was appointed interim manager of Chippenham Town until the end of the season before being given the job on a permanent basis following a successful interim spell in March 2020 following the early curtailment of the season. Cook left the club by mutual consent on 9 April 2022.

On 19 September 2023, Cook returned as manager of Gloucester City, being appointed after the departure of previous manager Tim Flowers.

On 8 May 2025, Cook departed the club.

== Honours ==
Cambridge United

- Football League Fourth Division play-offs: 1990
