= John Brough (English footballer) =

English footballer and manager

Personal information
- Full name: John Robert Brough
- Date of birth: 8 January 1973 (age 53)
- Place of birth: Ilkeston, England
- Position: Centre back

Senior career*
Years	Team	Apps	(Gls)
1991–1992	Notts County	0	(0)
1992–1994	Shrewsbury Town	16	(1)
1994	Telford United	7	(1)
1994–1998	Hereford United	112	(7)
1998–2004	Cheltenham Town	136	(6)
2005–2006	Aldershot Town	15	(0)
2006–2007	Newport County	47	(2)
- Bishop's Cleeve

Managerial career
- 2013–2014: Bishop's Cleeve
- 2014–2016: Cinderford Town
- 2016–2018: North Leigh
- 2019–2024: Cirencester Town
- * Club domestic league appearances and goals

John Robert Brough (born 8 January 1973) is an English former professional footballer who made more than 200 appearances in the Football League for Shrewsbury Town, Hereford United and Cheltenham Town as a centre back. He recently stepped down as manager of Cirencester Town following the club's resignation from the Southern League.

== Playing career ==
Brough spent seven years with Cheltenham after joining from Hereford United at the start of season 1998–99, at the same time as Neil Grayson and David Norton. Brough made 208 appearances for Cheltenham in those seven years, scoring 14 goals. A strong centre back, Brough often found himself deployed as a successful makeshift centre forward. Brough scored the first and played a part in the second of two injury time goals that gave Cheltenham a 2–1 away victory over title rivals Rushden & Diamonds in the 1998–99 season which saw promotion to the Football League. He joined Newport County from Aldershot Town in March 2006 and was released by Newport at the end of the 2006–07 season.

== Managerial career ==
After retiring from professional football, Brough became Youth Team Manager then Youth Team Manager/Head of Youth for Cheltenham Town. In May 2013, he was appointed first team manager at Southern League side Bishop's Cleeve, replacing former boss Alex Sykes. Having served less than a season as manager at Bishop's Cleeve, he left the club to become manager at league rivals Cinderford Town in April 2014. In May 2016 he left to take over as manager at North Leigh. He left North Leigh in May 2018.

In December 2019 he was appointed manager of Cirencester Town.
