= Horton Road Stadium =

Sports venue in Gloucester, England

- Location: Horton Road, Gloucester
- Coordinates: 51°51′48″N 2°13′30″W
- Opened: c.1964
- Closed: c.1986

The Horton Road Stadium was a football and greyhound racing stadium situated in Gloucester, England.

== Origins ==
The site chosen for the construction of the stadium was on the east side of the Horton Road on allotment gardens. The Horton Road Hospital was opposite on the east side of Horton Road and there was a gasholder station situated on the south west side of the stadium.

== Opening ==
The stadium opened in c.1964 and Gloucester City A.F.C. moved into the stadium from their ground at Longlevens (not to be confused with the greyhound stadium opposite). The Longlevens football ground was redeveloped for housing.

== Football ==
The football club played at the ground from 1964 until 1986.

== Greyhound racing ==
The track was a short lived independent (unaffiliated to a governing body) greyhound racing track. The racing started on 7 March 1975 and ended on 6 July 1979.

== Speedway ==
Planning was passed for speedway in early 1967 but following protests failed to materialise. There was however an instance of three races being held in January 1967 for the purposes of the testing noise levels for the Gloucester City Planning Committee.

== Closure ==
In 1986 Gloucester AFC moved to Meadow Park. The Horton Road ground became the Swallow Park housing estate.
