= Tim Harris (footballer) =

English football manager (born 1959)

Personal information
- Full name: Timothy Harris
- Date of birth: 17 October 1959 (age 67)
- Place of birth: Dymock, Gloucestershire, England

Managerial career
- Years: Team
- 1990–1997: Cinderford Town
- 1997–2002: Newport County
- 2003–2004: Forest Green Rovers
- 2005–2006: Merthyr Tydfil
- 2006–2008: Gloucester City
- 2011: Newport County (caretaker)
- 2014–2017: Gloucester City
- 2017–2018: Redditch United
- 2018: Tamworth (Director of Football)
- 2018–2019: Hereford (Head of Football)
- 2019: Hereford (caretaker)
- 2021–2022: Worcester City

Tim Harris is an English football manager who was most recently in charge of Worcester City.

== Playing career ==
Harris was a professional football player for several clubs, including Shrewsbury Town, Newport County, Cheltenham Town, Redditch United and as a goalkeeper for Gloucester City in the late 1970s. He was an assistant manager at Gloucester City twice, and has previous experience as a manager with Forest Green Rovers, Cinderford Town, Newport County and Merthyr Tydfil.

== Coaching career ==
In 2006 Harris was appointed as First Team Manager at Gloucester City, saving them from relegation and finishing in a respectable 13th place. In 2008 Harris moved 'upstairs' and became General Manager, handing over the first team manager job to assistant David Mehew. Gloucester gained promotion to the Football Conference for the 2009–10 season, via a play-off win at Farnborough.

The following week Harris was appointed as General Manager at Newport County alongside team manager Dean Holdsworth. Newport County were champions of the Conference South for the 2009–10 season and promoted to the Conference National for the 2010–11 season. Following Dean Holdsworth's departure, Harris was appointed caretaker manager on 13 January 2011. Following the appointment of Anthony Hudson on 1 April, Harris returned to his role as Director of Football. During his reign as director County won promotion to the Football League and also moved from Newport Stadium to share with local rugby sides Newport RFC and Newport Gwent Dragons at the 8,000 capacity (for football) Rodney Parade

In February 2014, he was re-appointed as first team manager at Gloucester City, replacing David Mehew. Harris once again steered the club away from relegation. Harris resigned as team manager on 30 November 2017.

In December 2017, he was appointed manager of Southern Premier Division side Redditch United.

On 19 September 2018, Harris was appointed Head of Football at National League North side Hereford with Marc Richards subsequently taking the Head Coach role at Hereford on 3 October 2018. On 13 August 2019, Harris was appointed caretaker manager until Russell Slade was hired on 29 August 2019. Harris decided to resign on 27 November 2019.

On 4 January 2021, Harris was appointed manager of Worcester City in the Midland Football League. Harris resigned from Worcester on 15 September 2022 and subsequently joined the board of Worcester City FC on 23 September 2022 as the Director in the role of Head of Football.

== Managerial statistics ==
As of match played 25 November 2017.

Managerial record by team and tenure
Team	From	To	Record					Ref
Team	From	To	P	W	D	L	Win %	Ref
Gloucester City	27 February 2014	25 November 2017	182	62	48	72	34.1	
Total			182	62	48	72	34.1	—
