= Gloucester City A.F.C. =

Association football club in England

Gloucester City
- Full name: Gloucester City Association Football Club
- Nickname: The Tigers
- Founded: 5 March 1883; 143 years ago
- Ground: Meadow Park
- Capacity: 4,000 (762 seats)
- Chairman: Colin Taylor
- Manager: Dafydd Williams
- League: Southern League Premier Division South
- 2025–26: Southern League Premier Division South, 3rd of 22
- Website: gloucestercityafc.com
| Home colours | Away colours |

Gloucester City Association Football Club is a semi-professional association football club based in Hempsted, Gloucester, England. The club is affiliated to the Gloucestershire County Football Association and, as of the 2025-26 season, plays in the Southern League Premier Division South, at the seventh tier of the English football league system.

The club traces its history back to 1883, when a club simply named Gloucester was founded, changing its name to Gloucester City in 1902 but folded in 1910. The current club was established at that time, originally called Gloucester YMCA before becoming Gloucester City in 1925. It spent a record 70 years within the Southern Football League from 1939 until 2009, when it secured promotion to the National League system after a play-off final win against Farnborough. Since promotion, and despite its southern location, the club has spent the majority of their seasons in the National League North, with a two-year spell in the National League South from 2017 to 2019.

After playing in six different locations across the city since foundation, Gloucester City found its long-tenured home at Longlevens from 1935 to 1964, followed by Horton Road Stadium from 1964 to 1986, and at Meadow Park from 1986 to 2007. In July 2007, countrywide flooding left Meadow Park under 8 feet (2.4 m) of water. From then until 2020, the club played exiled home games at Forest Green Rovers' New Lawn stadium in Nailsworth, Cirencester Town's Corinium Stadium, Cheltenham Town's Whaddon Road, and Evesham United's Jubilee Stadium. The club finally returned to a rebuilt Meadow Park in December 2020.

== History ==
=== Formation and the early years ===
Although born in March 1883, Gloucester AFC did not take their first steps until February 1884 almost one year after birth. An advert for that very first game played by Gloucester AFC appeared in The Citizen on Friday 8 February 1884:

Football – Gloucester Association v Warmley (Bristol) Association. – This match (the first in the city under Association Rules) will be played on the ground of the Hornets F.C., Union-lane, tomorrow. Kick off 3.15 p.m. – (Advt.)

However, that first Gloucester team folded in 1886. The club re-formed in September 1889. Gloucester's first competitive game in October 1889 was a Gloucestershire FA Junior Challenge Cup 1st Round tie beating Clifton Association Reserves 10–0 at Budding's Field.

The club became members of the Bristol and District League which subsequently became the Western League. During this era the club was noted as 'The Gloucestrians' and 'The Citizens' in local media. The club were renamed 'Gloucester City' in 1902 and later merged with St. Michael's at the beginning of the 1906–07 campaign, and in the process adopted St. Michael's red kit colours. This club then folded in September 1910. A different team, Gloucester YMCA, formed at the same time and most of the players who had been with City joined Gloucester YMCA.

By 1925, this latest club had assumed the name of Gloucester City once more and had become founder members of the Gloucestershire Northern Senior League. In 1934–35, after winning both the Cup and League, City turned semi-professional, and joined the Birmingham Combination, as well as moving to a new stadium in Longlevens where the club stayed for the next 26 years.

They won the Tillotson Cup for being the best club in the Birmingham Combination, and then had former Chelsea and Wolverhampton Wanderers striker Reg Weaver break all records with his 67 goals in the 1937–38 season.

=== Southern League entry and cup success ===
In 1939, the club played in the Southern Football League for the very first time, albeit in a restricted wartime competition, as they took part in the west section.

After the war, City rejoined the Southern League and went on to become the league's longest serving members. For three consecutive seasons, 1948–51, the club reached the First Round of the FA Cup, each time losing to Football League opponents: Mansfield Town (1–4 away), Norwich City (2–3 home), and Bristol City (0–4 away). The club's all-time attendance record was set at Longlevens in 1952, when Stan Myers and Peter Price scored to beat Tottenham Hotspur 2–1 in front of 10,500 spectators, a side which included the superstars of the day such as future World Cup winner Alf Ramsey, Ted Ditchburn, Charlie Withers and Les Medley.

In the 1955–56 season Gloucester won their first cup in the Southern League. A Southern League Cup final win against Yeovil Town in which City had lost the first leg 4–1, but beat Yeovil 5–1 in the second leg. This was the club's first major honor.

=== Horton Road era ===
In 1964, the club moved grounds again, from Longlevens to the massive Horton Road Stadium, closer to the centre of Gloucester, which could possibly hold over 30,000 people if full. Although Gloucester City were promoted to the Southern Football League Premier Division in the 1968–69 season, it was generally a barren spell.

In the 1981–82 season, a sixth-place finish was enough to clinch a place in the reformed Premier Division. They were also runners-up in the League Cup, going down 1–2 to Wealdstone, who included future England captain Stuart Pearce in their ranks.

Despite Kim Casey scoring 40 goals, the club were relegated to the Midland Division in 1984–85, after three seasons in the Premier Division.

=== Meadow Park and a famous FA Cup run ===
In 1986, the club moved once more, this time to Meadow Park. The Horton Road ground became a housing estate which now boasts the names of City legends: (Stan) Myers Road, (Dicky) Etheridge Place, and (Ron) Coltman Close amongst others.

Former Aston Villa and Wales player Brian Godfrey was appointed manager in 1988.

Players such as Lance Morrison, Steve Talboys, Wayne Noble, Chris Townsend and Brian Hughes took the club to the Southern League Midland Division title in 1989, clinching the crown at home against Grantham Town. The League trophy was presented to the club at King's Lynn's The Walks Stadium on the last day of a tough campaign.

The next big achievement of the Godfrey years was the famous FA Cup run in 1989–90 which has still not been matched. Mangotsfield United (4–0), Barry Town (2–2,2–0), Folkestone (1–0), and Dorchester Town (1–0) all came and went before City suffered heartbreak in the replay against Cardiff City after being 2–0 up at Ninian Park with just five minutes to go. The club were beaten 1–0 in the replay at Meadow Park, missing out on an encounter with First Division side Queens Park Rangers.

In the winter of 1990, Gloucester saw a major snowstorm and when the thaw came the River Severn overwhelmed all local flood plains. The knock-on effect of the flood saw incredible scenes at Meadow Park as the pitch was submerged under 4 feet (1.2 m) of water, and the whole ground was out of commission for over a month. The first game back at Meadow Park, however, saw City defeat Gosport Borough 9–0.

=== Last minute promotion heartbreak and debt ===
In the1990–91 season Godfrey added several players to his squad as City challenged for the league title. The Tuesday before the end of the season Gloucester City had needed to beat VS Rugby at home to go top of the table, but could only manage a 2–2 draw, so it was all on the last day of the season at the Victoria Ground, the home of Bromsgrove Rovers.

Farnborough headed up to Atherstone needing to win, and went 0–1 down to the delight of the thousand traveling City fans. In the final minutes, substitute John Freegard got his head to a long free kick had put The Tigers ahead. In the meantime Farnborough had scored, as City fans were on the pitch celebrating the Championship and promotion to the Conference National, but all they had heard were premature radio reports from Atherstone; Farnborough had actually scored a winner three minutes before the end of the game and they were promoted instead.

In July 1991, the club became the first British football club to venture to the newly independent country of Georgia for a summer tour, playing second division side Napareuli, Mesxti and Umaglesi Liga outfit Shevardeni. The club hosted European sides at Meadow Park during this period, such as Dinamo Minsk from Belarus and Gornik Zabrze from Poland.

Into the 1991–92 season, the bombshell hit City that Chairman Les Alderman had left the club. The squad was ripped apart: major players were released for derisory sums, some went unpaid and took the club to the FA, and forced a transfer embargo. Brian Godfrey was sacked and replaced by his assistant Steve Millard. Millard only lasted three months in what was a disastrous spell. In February Godfrey was re-appointed to the hot seat and started to turn things around again. The club survived the next few seasons under the guidance of Chairman George Irvine. The club had crippling debts and were about to fold when Keith Gardner stepped in.

=== The glory years and FA Trophy run ===
Gardner appointed former Cheltenham Town boss John Murphy as the club entered the most exciting period in their history. Gardner wanted to make the whole 'Meadow Park' area into a footballing centre, with all-seater stadium, a leisure centre, ice rink and an all-weather pitch. His ambitions were matched on the field too, after seeing the club get by with local players, talent was brought in from further afield and the Tigers became a force to be reckoned with. A memorable game during the period was when Dave Porter scored the only goal in a 1–0 victory over rivals Cheltenham Town at Whaddon Road in 1994.

Murphy was dismissed in March 1996. Former West Ham United striker Leroy Rosenior took over.

Adie Mings scoring against Dagenham and Redbridge

Dale Watkins, Adie Mings and record signing David Holmes formed one of the most potent front lines in non-league football and it was no surprise to see the Tigers battling on all fronts. Despite having to play manager Leroy Rosenior in goal against Kingstonian in their first game in the FA Trophy, City managed to reach the semi-final before being beaten by Dagenham & Redbridge after a dramatic replay.

During the cup run City had to play three games a week to claw back games in hand and eventually lost out to Cheltenham Town in the race for second spot (after Champions Gresley Rovers ground was deemed ineligible for promotion).

=== Relegation and almost bankrupt ===
A diminishing playing budget and poor performances resulted in relegation. To exacerbate the situation, just before Christmas 2000, Meadow Park was struck another blow when the River Severn burst its banks for the second time in a decade. The flood water did more damage than on the previous occasion, reaching just under 7 feet (2.1 m) high and flooding the changing rooms, causing widespread damage. The club was unable to hold matches at the ground for more than six weeks. The resulting lack of revenue almost saw the club go bankrupt, and several players left the club after not being paid.

Tommy Callinan took over in a player-manager role, and left at the end of the 2000–01 season. He was followed by Chris Burns, who was tempted back from Forest Green Rovers and brought with him a number of inexperienced young players to accommodate the club's limited wage structure.

In November 2001, ex-director Colin Gardner returned to the club to take over the chairmanship. Working together with the Supporters' Club, they stabilised the financial situation. The situation on the pitch also improved, with new manager Chris Burns moulding his former City youth team into a force to be reckoned with.

=== Bouncing back ===
The 2002–03 season saw the club bounce back. Off the field, a deal was struck between the club and local entrepreneur Eamonn McGurk, who bought the ground and took on the majority of the club's debts. Financially, the club made a trading profit for the first time and were within reach of wiping out all of the historical debts. To add to the upturn, on the field Burns' young team reached the quarter finals of the FA Trophy. The run included memorable victories away at league leaders Merthyr Tydfil, then two wins at Conference sides Woking and Southport. Aylesbury United of the Isthmian League proved to be too big of a challenge, however, and City bowed out. In the league, the club achieved a fifth-placed finish.

The 2003–04 season saw further progress with the Tigers finishing second in the Western Division and gaining promotion to the Premier Division. At the end of the season, Colin Gardner stepped down as the chairman. Chris Burns resigned as manager in January 2006, Neil Mustoe took over as caretaker-manager until the permanent appointment of Tim Harris from Merthyr Tydfil was made.

=== Flooding, promotion and exile ===
In July 2007, Gloucester City's home, Meadow Park, was affected by the Gloucestershire flooding that engulfed the county. The club was hit with almost 8 miles (13 km) of water, almost submerging the crossbar. An astonishing picture, featured in The Sun, on Sky News and on the BBC, shot the club to national attention both in the media and among football supporters across the country. It caused many of the club's supporters to start a donation fund to help the club.

The club's first season in exile was at Forest Green Rovers New Lawn Stadium, despite the loss of a stadium and revenue stream the club finished a creditable 6th in the league, just outside the Playoffs.

The club's second season in exile at Cirencester Town proved to be one of the greatest in history. The club finished 3rd in the Southern Premier League thus qualifying for the Playoffs. In the Southern League Playoff semi-final Cambridge City were beaten 3–1 at the Corinium Stadium. They went on to play Farnborough in the final at Cherrywood Road and won 1–0 with Matt Rose scoring the crucial goal, ending a 70-year continuous association with the Southern Football League, and gaining promotion to Conference Football for the first time.

In a controversial decision, the F.A. placed Gloucester City in the Conference North for the 2009–10 season. The reason given was that Worcester City, despite being considerably further north than both Gloucester and Cirencester, was given a guarantee after being moved to the Conference South the previous year against its will that it would not be moved back to the North for three seasons without its consent. Worcester City refused to consent to an early move back to the North, thus forcing Gloucester to take their place. The club finished 18th in its maiden Conference North season.

Near the end of the club's maiden Conference North season, new F.A. ground regulations meant that Cirencester Town's Corinium Stadium would not be suitable for use in the following season meaning if the club failed to find a suitable new home, it would be forcibly relegated. It was announced in March 2010 that the club would be groundsharing with major rivals Cheltenham Town for the forthcoming two seasons. Gloucester City Council provided £20,000 towards helping this agreement, heralding a new era in co-operation between the club and the council, and with Cheltenham Town.

On 21 November 2010, against Chelmsford City, midfielder Tom Webb became the club's all-time appearance holder, beating Stan Myers who had broken the record 50 years previously.

In 2012–13, the club reached the FA Cup 1st Round proper for the first time in 23 years, drawing Football League One outfit Leyton Orient at home. They eventually lost 2–0 to two late goals. The club repeated this success the following season, drawing Football League Two side Fleetwood Town at home, they also lost that one 2–0.

For the 2017–18 season, the club was moved back to the National League South. Manager Tim Harris and Chairman Mike Dunstan both expressed their disappointment at the decision. Furthermore, the club was forced to play home games outside Gloucestershire for the first time in their history. After the conclusion of the groundshare deal with Cheltenham Town, the club's only viable option was to groundshare with Southern League side Evesham United, in Worcestershire, whilst construction on the new stadium continued at the old Meadow Park site.

On 30 November 2017, manager Tim Harris resigned from his position citing that the club "needs some investment, some structure and business acumen if it is to maintain any hope of returning home at this level." Harris was soon followed by Chairman Mike Dunstan, first team assistant manager Marc Richards, the kit man, the media officer and the club accountant who all cited the same reasons for leaving as Harris. Player/coach Will Morford became acting manager until 15 December 2017 when former player and assistant manager Marc Richards returned and was appointed manager, with Morford becoming player/assistant manager. Under Richards, City pushed away from the relegation zone and the club went on to mount a small playoff push earning Richards the February Manager of the Month award before finishing a respectable 14th.

On 2 October 2018, it was announced that Marc Richards was to leave the club by mutual consent. He would later join former City manager Tim Harris at Hereford F.C along with assistant manager Will Morford and the club's performance analyst. Tom Webb and Mike Green took the joint role of caretaker manager.

As the search began for a new manager, on 5 October 2018, club legend and record appearance holder Tom Webb announced his retirement from his playing career. Webb made 719 appearances for the club in a career spanning 18 years.

On 10 October 2018, the search was over and Chris Todd was announced as the new first team manager following a 3 nil FA Cup win away at Dorking Wanderers. On 3 January 2019 however, Todd left the club by mutual consent after a spell of 15 games without a win.

On 8 January 2019, City appointed former player Mike Cook as manager. He was joined by other ex-Tigers Karl Bayliss and Andy Hoskins, whilst Tom Webb and Mike Green were retained to complete the coaching staff. Results picked up and a dramatic 3–2 win against Chippenham Town confirmed Gloucester's National League status again.

On 18 April 2019, the club announced a change to the badge moving away from the Tiger logo and instead to a new logo encompassing the Gloucestershire coat of arms, Gloucester Cathedral, Gloucester Docks and the City skyline. The kit colour will also change from yellow and black back to a predominantly red kit from the 2019/2020 season onward.

On 16 November 2019, manager Mike Cook was sacked as Gloucester City manager with the club lying mid-table in the National League North. A replacement was swiftly appointed in the form of ex-West Ham United coach James Rowe, who became the first full-time appointed manager of the club.

Work began on the new stadium on 5 January 2020 with an expected completion date being the start of the 2020–21 season.

The 2019–20 season would end up becoming one of the most historic in the history of the game of football as the COVID-19 pandemic swept the world and football ground to a halt. The season was cut short in March 2020 and, at the time of the decision, City were lying in 19th position but would eventually jump up to 17th as the season was decided on points per game. City's final game in exile was a 2–1 home win at Evesham against Farsley Celtic. Meanwhile, work continued in the off season on the new stadium and it was ready in time for the 2020–21 season.

=== Return to Gloucester ===
After 13 years in exile, City returned to Gloucester in time for the 2020–21 season. Unfortunately, due to the COVID-19 pandemic, the restart of the season was thrown into doubt. Due to the National League obtaining 'Elite' status in order to complete the play-offs for the season previous, there was now an issue, as was the case with all 'Elite' sport, that spectators were not allowed to attend matches and clubs needed this revenue stream in order to survive. After a financial package was agreed with the government, the season was able to start.

The first competitive game at New Meadow Park was on 6 October 2020 as City hosted Kettering Town in a behind closed doors league game with City running away 3–1 winners and the honour of first competitive goal at the new stadium going to Alex Whittle. City flew out of the blocks at the start of the 2020–21 season recording 7 wins and 2 draws in their opening 9 league matches, which was the best start to a league campaign since the Second World War. On 24 November 2020, following interest from ex-Football League club Chesterfield, James Rowe left for the Spireites. Jake Cole took temporary charge of first team duties until Paul Groves was appointed on 8 December 2020. The National League campaign ground to a halt in February 2021 with City sitting top of the league. Following a vote amongst clubs, it was announced that step two of non-League football will cease with immediate effect after a vote of 24–19 in favour of ending the current campaign as the financial implications of the coronavirus pandemic continue to take their toll at the levels of the football pyramid below the EFL.

After a disastrous start to the 2021–22 season, including a humiliating 9–0 defeat at Chorley, Paul Groves was sacked and replaced by Gloucester-born Lee Mansell who steadied the ship and earned City a 17th-place finish. The following season, however, started badly for Mansell and he was replaced by Steven King. City finished the season in the play-off places, following a dramatic 4–3 victory over Chorley at New Meadow Park on the final day of the 2022–23 season, whereby City scored 2 goals in injury time.. This set up a play-off quarter-final at Brackley Town. The match went to penalties after the two sides were unable to be separated during normal and extra time, and the Northamptonshire side went on to win the shootout 5–3.

Following the conclusion of the season, it was announced that Steven King would leave the club citing the clubs move back to a part-time model, and ex-Blackburn Rovers goalkeeper and Premier League winner Tim Flowers was named as his replacement. Flowers lost his job in September and was replaced by a returning Mike Cook, but he was unable to turn the season around as City succumbed to relegation after 15 years in the National League.

The 2024–25 season saw City finish 4th in the Southern League South and qualify for the playoffs. City travelled to London-based Walton & Hersham in the semi-final, and prevailed on penalties setting up a playoff final away at A.F.C. Totton which City would lose 0–1. In the following days, it was announced that Mike Cook's contract would not be renewed and he was to be replaced by former assistant manager and Newport County caretaker Daf Williams.

== Grounds ==
| Dates | Ground |
|---|---|
| 1883–1895 | Buddings Field |
| 1895–1896 | Avenue Road Ground |
| 1896–1897 | Co-operative Field |
| 1897–1898 | Buddings Field (2nd) |
| 1898–1902 | Avenue Road Ground (2nd) |
| 1902–1913 | Buddings Field (3rd) |
| 1913–1925 | Llanthony Ground |
| 1925–1926 | Avenue Road Ground (3rd) |
| 1926–1927 | Buddings Field (4th) |
| 1927–1933 | Sutgrove Park |
| 1933–1936 | Bon Marche Ground |
| 1936–1964 | The Ground at Longlevens |
| 1964–1986 | Horton Road Stadium |
| 1986–2007 | Meadow Park |
| 2007–2008 | The New Lawn, Nailsworth |
| 2008–2010 | The Corinium Stadium, Cirencester |
| 2010–2017 | Whaddon Road, Cheltenham |
| 2017–2020 | Jubilee Stadium, Evesham |
| 2020–present | New Meadow Park, Gloucester |

Throughout its history, the club has played at many grounds in Gloucester, the surrounding region of Gloucestershire and Worcestershire.

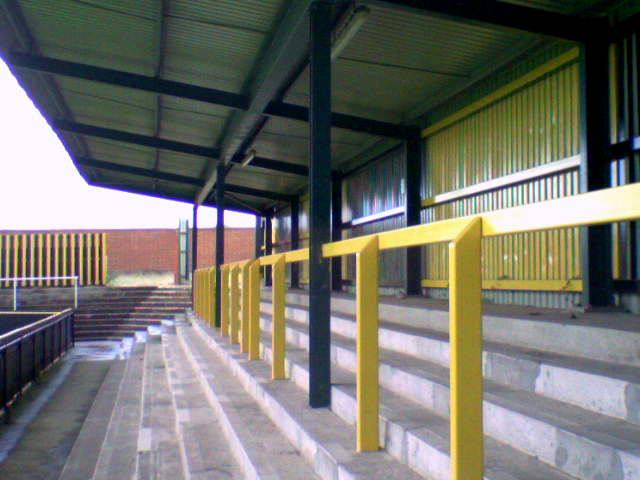
The T-End at Meadow Park

In the late 19th century, the club played at Buddings Field near the city centre for 16 non-consecutive seasons, they then moved to the Avenue Road Ground on Tuffley Avenue for another non-consecutive 6 seasons. During this period, the club also played at Co-operative Ground on India Road.

In 1910, Gloucester YMCA played at the Llanthony Ground in Hempsted for, believed to be only a stone's throw from Meadow Park. During this period the club played multiple games at Gloucester R.F.C. and the Kingsholm Stadium.

In 1928, the club moved to Sutgrove Park, which is now the site for the Ribston Hall High School. They moved once again in 1934 to the Bon Marche Ground on Estcourt Road for two seasons.

In 1935, the club moved to The Ground in Longlevens. It spent the next 26 seasons at the stadium, where the club's all-time record attendance was set: 10,500 at home to Tottenham Hotspur in a friendly.

In 1964, the club moved to the massive Horton Road Stadium, a huge bowl which if fully developed could've held over 35,000 spectators. The club stayed here until 1986, until the move to Meadow Park in Hempsted.

The club had played at Meadow Park since 1986. The ground had a total capacity of 4,500 with a 560-seat stand.

Following the floods of summer 2007, on 22 July, Meadow Park was almost 8 feet under water. A combination of a lack of insurance due to previous flooding - this being the third time in seventeen years that the stadium had been flooded - and contamination by sewage water, the club had no choice but to abandon the ground for the foreseeable future.

=== Exile from Gloucester ===
During the club's exile period away from the city, it played at Forest Green Rovers' ground The New Lawn in Nailsworth for one season. They spent the following two seasons at Cirencester Town's ground, The Corinium Stadium.

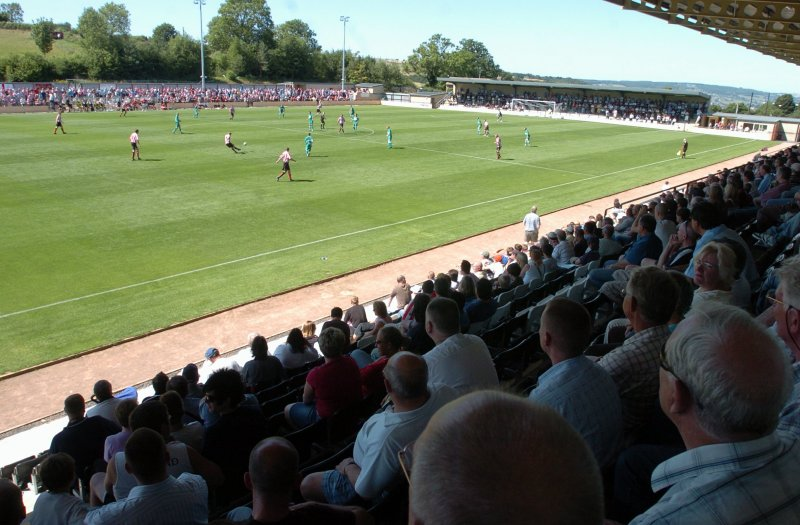
The New Lawn, home to Gloucester City during the 2007–08 season.

The club's attempts to relocate back to the city were scuppered on multiple occasions. A groundshare with Northern Senior League division two side Quedgeley Wanderers, who play around four miles outside the city boundaries in Quedgeley, was rejected in November 2007, after the Wanderers' board and the local parish rejected the proposal.

Hopes of any groundshare with Gloucester Rugby Club's Kingsholm stadium were deemed too expensive. Gloucester Rugby Club had also earlier rejected plans to move to a new purpose built 15,000 capacity community stadium in a derelict area of the city nicknamed "The Triangle" near to the railway station. Both the rugby and football club were earmarked to use the facility and it could have been extended to hold 25,000 people.

An option spoken about for a ground was at Blackbridge, a former athletics ground in an area around 3 miles outside the City centre called Podsmead. Any news regarding this possible switch soon went quiet, with the main area of concern being poor access roads and a spate of vandalism already occurring in that district.

Another option was a shared new purpose-built stadium in Javelin Park, an area in-between Gloucester and Stroud off Junction 12 of the M5 motorway. The ground was to be used by the football club and Stroud Rugby Club. However, in the end the rugby club decided not to pursue the proposal and the area is now being lined up to have an incinerator instead.

In November 2008, local MP and supporter Parmjit Dhanda spoke in the House of Commons regarding the search for a new home for the club in the city in the hopes of finding a successful outcome.

After the one season stay at Forest Green Rovers, the club moved to Cirencester Town and spent two seasons there, culminating in promotion to the Conference North.

For the 2010–11, 2011–12, 2012–13, and 2013–14 seasons, the club played its home games at rivals Cheltenham Town's Whaddon Road stadium, due to League legislation meaning Cirencester Town's Corinium Stadium was not up to a good enough standard. Not finding a stadium suitable would have meant immediate relegation for the Tigers.

Plans to return to Meadow Park were now the frontrunner for the club's return to Gloucester. On 16 February 2011, it was announced that the club would be applying for planning permission in early March 2011 for a brand new stadium at Meadow Park, incorporating flood defence measures and an adjacent business park. On 29 December 2011, Gloucester City Council formally validated plans for a new stadium in Gloucester, but the scheme collapsed in September 2012 when the Council advised it could not approve the plans without more detailed flood risk assessments. This was deemed too costly by the club and with the exile away from the City getting longer the club decided to abandon the plans.

For the 2014–15 season, the club once again played in Cheltenham. However, new plans had since been drawn up, using the same architects who designed AFC Telford United's and Forest Green Rovers' new stadium. The plans were for a "Category A" 4,000 capacity stadium. Outline planning was submitted to Gloucester City Council in June 2014.

On 7 October 2014, after seven years in exile, the club plans for a new stadium at Meadow Park were approved by Gloucester City Council subject to completing 45 planning conditions.

After a long push for a return home, confirmation that outline planning permission had been granted by the council came on 22 September 2015. This was followed by a full reserved matters application for a 3,060 capacity category B stadium being validated by the council on 26 May 2016. The plan incorporated an additional phase of work to take the stadium to over 4,000 capacity and meet FA category A requirements to enable the club to take part in the National League. Finally, the club received full planning permission from Gloucester City Council to build the stadium on 4 October 2016. Prior to construction work beginning on the new stadium, work was carried out to raise the level of the ground away from any possible future flooding.

After the conclusion of a seven-year groundshare agreement with Cheltenham Town for seasons 2017–18, 2018–19, and 2019–20, Gloucester ground-shared with Evesham United at the Jubilee Stadium, Evesham. This was the first time the club played its home fixtures outside Gloucestershire and uniquely made them the only club at National South level or higher playing outside its own County until Truro City's announcement of a groundshare at Torquay occurred in July 2018.

On 5 October 2018, the club also released revised plans for the new stadium. The new scaled down plan gave the club a view to making the project deliverable for 2020. The plans included the retention and conversion of Arriva House, the construction of two 350-seat covered stands, provision of an enlarged T-End and the existing open terraced stand currently located in at Evesham United. These amended plans were approved by Gloucester City Council in May 2019.

== Honours ==
- Southern Football League
  - Premier Division play-off winners: 2008–09
  - Premier Division runners-up: 1990–91
  - Premier Division South play-off runners-up: 2024–25
  - Midland Division champions: 1988–89
  - Western Division runners-up: 2003–04
  - Southern League Cup: 1955–56
  - Southern League Cup runners-up: 1981–82
  - Merit Cup Winners: 1968–69
- Birmingham Combination Tillotson Shield
  - Winners: 1935–36
- Gloucestershire Northern Senior League
  - Champions: 1933–34
  - Runners-up: 1925–26, 1932–33, 1934–35
- North Gloucestershire League
  - Division One champions: 1907–08,1908–09
- Gloucester and District League
  - Division One champions: 1897–98, 1899–1900, 1903–04
  - Division One runners-up: 1898–99, 1906–07
- Cheltenham and District League
  - Division One champions: 1906–07
  - Division One runners-up: 1909–10
- Mid Gloucestershire League
  - Champions: 1898–99, 1899–1900, 1900–01
- Gloucester City Hurrans Cup League [War-time League]
  - Runners-up: 1942–43
- Gloucestershire FA Senior Professional Cup
  - Winners (18 Times) : 1950, 1951, 1953, 1955, 1956, 1958, 1966, 1969, 1970, 1975, 1979, 1980, 1981, 1983, 1984, 1991, 1993, 2024.
  - Runners-up (36 Times): 1936, 1937, 1938, 1940, 1946, 1948, 1949, 1952, 1954, 1957, 1959, 1960, 1961, 1962, 1963, 1964, 1965, 1967, 1970, 1972, 1973, 1974, 1976, 1976, 1978, 1981, 1985, 1987, 1992, 1994, 1996, 1997, 1999, 2009, 2010, 2018
- Worcestershire FA Senior Professional Cup
  - Runners-up: 1983–84
- Gloucestershire FA Senior Amateur Cup
  - Winners: 1931–32
  - Runners-up: 1929–30, 1932–33
- Gloucestershire FA Junior Cup
  - Winners: 1902–03
  - Runners-up: 1892–93, 1906–07
- Godsman Cup [War-time Cup]
  - Runners-up: 1942–43
- City Cup [War-Time Cup]
  - Finalist: 1942–43
- Severn Sport Shield
  - Winners: 2018–19
  - Runners-up: 2025–26

== Club records ==
- Best League position: 1st in National League North, 2020-21 (Level 6 in Football Pyramid)
- Best FA Cup performance: Second round replay, 1989–90 v Cardiff City
- Best Welsh Cup performance: Quarter-final replay, 1958–59 v Cardiff City
- Best FA Trophy performance: Semi-final replay, 1996–97 v Dagenham & Redbridge
- Record fee paid: £25,000, Steve Fergusson, Worcester City 1990–91
- Record fee received: £25,000 Ian Hedges, AFC Bournemouth, 1989–90
- Record Attendance:
  - Longlevens: 10,500 v Tottenham Hotspur, friendly, 1952
  - Horton Road: 7,500 v Wimbledon, friendly, 1966
  - Meadow Park: 4,500 v Dagenham & Redbridge, FA Trophy Semi-Final, April 1997
- Record Victory: 16–0 v Army 'G', February 1942. (Wartime), 12–1 v Bristol Saint George, April 1934. (Non Wartime)
- Record Defeat: 0–14 v Brimscombe F.C., January 1923.

=== Player records ===
==== Most appearances ====
Currently at club in bold

| # | Name | Career | Appearances | Goals |
|---|---|---|---|---|
| 1 | (England) Tom Webb | 2000–2018 | 719 | 38 |
| 2 | (England) Stan Myers | 1950–1960 | 412 | 26 |
| 3 | (England) Neil Mustoe | 2002–2014 | 381 | 9 |
| 4 | (England) Gary Kemp | 1990–1999 | 368 | 28 |
| 5 | (England) Lee Smith | 2000–2011 | 366 | 76 |
| 6 | (England) Rob Coldray | 1954–1969 | 348 | 108 |
| 7 | (England) Frank Tredgett | 1949–1959 | 328 | 2 |
| 8 | (England) **Joe Hanks** | 2014–present | 326 | 75 |
| 9 | (England) Chris Burns | 1996–2005 | 315 | 41 |
| 10 | (Scotland) Bobby McCool | 1965–1974 | 297 | 57 |

==== Most goals ====
| # | Name | Career | Goals | Appearances | Goals/Game Ratio |
|---|---|---|---|---|---|
| 1 | (England) Jerry Causon | 1930–1936 | 209 | 196 | 1.066 |
| 2 | (England) Rob Coldray | 1954–1969 | 110 | 348 | 0.316 |
| 3 | (England) Reg Weaver | 1937–1946 | 103 | 84 | 1.226 |
| 4 | (England) Jimmy Cox | 1999–2006 | 96 | 245 | 0.392 |
| 5= | (England) Karl Bayliss | 1985–2004 | 92 | 243 | 0.379 |
| 5= | (England) Doug Foxwell | 1972–1988 | 92 | 264 | 0.348 |
| 7 | (England) John Evans | 1976–1982 | 86 | 265 | 0.325 |
| 8 | (England) Enos Drew | 1931–1938 | 84 | 252 | 0.333 |
| 9 | (England) Lee Smith | 2000–2011 | 76 | 366 | 0.208 |
| 10 | (England) **Joe Hanks** | 2014–present | 75 | 326 | 0.221 |

== Players ==
=== Current squad ===
As of 12 June 2026

Note: Flags indicate national team as defined under FIFA eligibility rules; some limited exceptions apply. Players may hold more than one non-FIFA nationality.

| No. | Pos. | Nation | Player |
|---|---|---|---|
| 1 | GK | NIR | Jared Thompson |
| 2 | DF | ENG | Daniel Leadbitter |
| 5 | DF | WAL | Ben Morgan |
| 6 | DF | ENG | Michael O'Regan |
| 7 | MF | ENG | Ed Williams |
| 9 | FW | ENG | Kieran Phillips |
| 11 | MF | WAL | Elis Watts |
| 12 | DF | ENG | Keiran Thomas |
| 13 | MF | ENG | Joe Hanks |

| No. | Pos. | Nation | Player |
|---|---|---|---|
| 14 | MF | WAL | James Waite |
| 15 | MF | ENG | Liam Cross |
| 17 | DF | ENG | Harry Emmett |
| 18 | FW | ENG | King Baidoo |
| 21 | GK | NIR | Conor Thompson |
| — | DF | WAL | Morgan Lewis |
| — | DF | ENG | Ben Nugent |
| — | MF | ENG | Jake Evans |
| — | MF | ENG | Tom Owen-Evans |

=== Out on loan ===
Note: Flags indicate national team as defined under FIFA eligibility rules; some limited exceptions apply. Players may hold more than one non-FIFA nationality.

| No. | Pos. | Nation | Player |
|---|---|---|---|
| — | MF | ENG | Finn Bell (Dual registration with Cirencester Town) |

=== Notable former players ===
For details on former players, see Category:Gloucester City A.F.C. players.

==== Former international players ====
- Nathaniel Jarvis – 13 caps, three goals, for Antigua and Barbuda.
- Curtis Jemmett-Hutson - 2 caps, for Barbados.
- Jonte Smith – 15 caps, two goals, for Bermuda.
- Hayden Turner – Two caps for Cornwall.
- Jeff Blockley – One cap for England.
- Adolf Hanson – One war-time cap for England.
- Douglas Hunt – One war-time cap for England.
- Frank Saunders – One cap for England.
- Joe Wollacott – Seven caps for Ghana.
- Jake Gosling – 12 caps, 2 goals for Gibraltar.
- Dejon Noel-Williams – Eight caps for Grenada.
- Jacob Berkeley-Agyepong – 16 caps, 1 goal, for Grenada.
- Keanu Marsh-Brown – 16 caps, 1 goal, for Guyana.
- Tré Mitford – 6 caps for Guyana.
- Theo Robinson - 7 caps, for Jamaica.
- Omar Holness - 5 caps, for Jamaica.
- Yaser Kasim - 21 caps, 3 goals, for Iraq.
- Tommy Casey – 17 caps for Northern Ireland including at 1958 World Cup.
- Shabir Khan – Nine caps, 1 goal, for Pakistan.
- Omari Sterling-James – 28 caps, four goals, for Saint Kitts and Nevis.
- Leroy Rosenior – One cap for Sierra Leone.
- Marcus Browning – Five caps for Wales.
- Trevor Ford – 38 caps for Wales.
- Brian Godfrey – Three caps for Wales.
- Dai Jones – Seven caps for Wales.
- Robert Mills-Roberts – Eight caps for Wales
- Eddie Parris – One cap for Wales, first black player to play for Wales.
- Neil Slatter – 22 caps for Wales.
- Gareth Taylor – 15 caps for Wales.
- Rod Thomas – 47 caps for Wales.
- Tony Villars – Three caps for Wales.

==== Notable other internationals ====
- Gilbert Jessop – 18 caps for England Cricket
- Grahame Parker – Two caps for England Rugby
- Frank Stout – 14 caps for England Rugby
- Percy Stout – Five caps for England Rugby

==== Notable other sportsmen ====
- (England) C.E Brown – played rugby for Gloucester RFC.
- (England) Trevor Halls – played rugby for Gloucester RFC.
- (England) Edward James – played rugby for Gloucester RFC
- (England) Arthur Jepson – Cricket Test Match Umpire and played cricket for Nottinghamshire CCC.
- (England) Don Meadows – played rugby for Gloucester RFC.
- (England) Geoffrey Morton – played cricket for Middlesex CCC.
- (England) William Murch – played cricket for Gloucestershire CCC.
- (England) Phil Neale – played cricket for Worcestershire CCC.
- (England) Trevor Powell – played rugby for Gloucester RFC.
- (England) Thomas Rust – played cricket for Gloucestershire CCC.
- (South Africa) Cyril Sewell – played cricket for Gloucestershire CCC.
- (England) Eric Stephens – played cricket for Gloucestershire CCC and rugby for Gloucester RFC.
- (England) Walter Taylor – played rugby for Gloucester RFC.
- (England) Ronald Turner – played cricket for Gloucestershire CCC.
- (England) George Sutton Watson – played cricket for Kent CCC and Leicestershire CCC.

== Management ==
=== Football Management Team ===
| Job title | Name |
|---|---|
| Manager | Dafydd Williams (Wales) |
| Assistant Manager | Kevin Phillips (England) |
| Player-Coach | Aaron Wildig (England) |
| Goalkeeper Coach | Conor Thompson (England) |
| Sports Therapist | Adam Plater (England) |
| Analyst | Sam Viner (England) |

=== Club Staff ===
| Job title | Name |
|---|---|
| Chairman | Colin Taylor (England) |
| Secretary | Chris Hill (England) |

=== Managerial history ===
Pre 1931, the term Manager was interchangeable with the term Secretary, thus the difference is noted.

==== Secretaries ====
Listed according to when they became Secretary for Gloucester City:

- 1883-1884 (England) W.H. Clarke
- 1884-1885 (England) Alfred J. Smith
- 1885-1888 (England) Herbert Benfield
- 1888-1889 (England) Algernon S. King
- 1889-1890 (England) Rev. Henry L. Brereton
- 1890-1893 (England) William H. Benfield
- 1893-1897 (England) Henry T. Robins
- 1897-1898 (England) James G. Washbourn
- 1898-1902 (England) Randolph Lewis
- 1902-1903 (England) Henry W. Arkell & (England) Henry Sherwood
- 1903-1906 (England) Frank R. Crawley & (England) Henry Sherwood
- 1906-1909 (England) Joseph E. Palmer
- 1909-1910 (England) Oliver J.A. Carter
- 1910-1911 (England) Arthur J. Hayward
- 1911-1919 (England) Henry E.W. Barry
- 1919-1920 (England) Maurice Harrison
- 1920-1931 (England) Lemuel A. Beddis

==== Managers ====
Listed according to when they became managers for Gloucester City:

(C) – Caretaker

- 1931-1938 (England) Maurice Hukin
- 1938 (England) Albert Prince-Cox
- 1938-1940 (England) Joseph Selby Thomas
- 1940-1946 (England) William S. Blunn
- 1946-1948 (England) Cyril Dean
- 1948 (England) Jack F. Whiting & (England)
- 1948-1952 (England) Douglas Hunt
- 1952-1954 (Scotland) Jimmy Buist
- 1954-1959 (Scotland) Harry Ferrier
- 1959-1960 (Northern Ireland) Ollie Norris
- 1960 (England) Frank Tredgett
- 1960 (Scotland) Phillip Friel (C)
- 1960-1962 (England) Maurice Hukin (2nd)
- 1962-1963 (England) Ron Humpston
- 1963-1965 (Northern Ireland) Tommy Casey
- 1965-1966 (Scotland) Robert Grant
- 1966-1967 (England) Cyril Williams
- 1967 (England) Dick Etheridge (C)
- 1967-1968 (England) Harold Fletcher
- 1968-1969 (Scotland) Ian McIntosh
- 1969-1970 (England) Dick Etheridge (2nd)
- 1970 (England) Rob Coldray
- 1970 (England) Dick Etheridge (3rd)
- 1970-1971 (Wales) John Preece
- 1971 (England) Dick Etheridge (4th) (C)
- 1971-1972 (Scotland) Ian McIntosh (2nd)
- 1972-1973 (England) Dick Etheridge (5th)
- 1973-1976 (England) Bobby Etheridge
- 1976-1977 (England) Colin Moulsdale
- 1977-1980 (England) Bob Mursell
- 1980 (England) Dick Etheridge (6th) (C)
- 1980-1982 (Scotland) Bobby Campbell
- 1982 (England) John Layton
- 1982-1984 (England) Bob Mursell (2nd)
- 1984-1985 (England) Tony Freely
- 1985 (England) Bobby Etheridge (2nd) (C)
- 1985 (England) Paul Richardson
- 1985-1987 (England) Steve Scarrott
- 1987-1991 (Wales) Brian Godfrey
- 1991-1992 (England) Steve Millard (C)
- 1992-1994 (Wales) Brian Godfrey (2nd)
- 1994 (England) Gary Goodwin & (England) Brian Hughes (C)
- 1994-1996 (England) John Murphy
- 1996-1998 (Sierra Leone) Leroy Rosenior
- 1998-2000 (England) Brian Hughes (2nd)
- 2000-2001 (England) Tommy Callinan
- 2001-2006 (England) Chris Burns
- 2006 (England) Neil Mustoe & (England) Adie Harris (C)
- 2006-2008 (England) Tim Harris
- 2008-2014 (England) David Mehew
- 2014-2017 (England) Tim Harris (2nd)
- 2017 (England) Will Morford (C)
- 2017-2018 (England) Marc Richards
- 2018 (England) Tom Webb & (England) Mike Green (C)
- 2018-2019 (Wales) Chris Todd
- 2019 (England) Tom Webb & (England) Mike Green (2nd) (C)
- 2019 (England) Mike Cook
- 2019-2020 (England) James Rowe
- 2020 (England) Jake Cole (C)
- 2020-2021 (England) Paul Groves
- 2021-2022 (England) Lee Mansell
- 2022-2023 (England) Steven King
- 2023 (England) Tim Flowers
- 2023-2025 (England) Mike Cook (2nd)
- 2025- (Wales) Dafydd Williams

== Rivalries ==
=== Cheltenham Town ===
The near proximity of Cheltenham to Gloucester has led to the rivalry with Cheltenham Town being competed for more than a century, in local and regional divisions. The first of these matches were played in 1898 and since then 212 matches have been contested between the clubs. However, the most recent league game between the two was in 1997 and since then, competitive matches between the clubs have stopped due to Cheltenham Town's rise up the English football league system. This could have been Gloucester City if they had defeated Salisbury City on the final day of the 1996–97 season, however City lost 3–1 and Cheltenham were promoted due to champions Gresley Rovers' ground not being to a sufficient standard for Conference football. From 2010 to 2017, Gloucester City ground-shared at Cheltenham Town's Whaddon Road stadium.

=== Forest Green Rovers ===
The rivalry between with Forest Green Rovers has only become a recent phenomenon. For the majority of both club's history, Gloucester City were in a higher league. In 1998, Forest Green Rovers achieved promotion to the Football Conference after only a couple of seasons in the Southern League. However, in 2007, Gloucester City began groundsharing at Rovers' New Lawn Stadium, which ended acrimoniously between the clubs, forcing the Tigers further into exile at Cirencester Town. In 2014, the club's met in the FA Cup; their first competitive meeting in a generation.

=== Worcester City ===
Gloucester City and Worcester City contest the Severn Derby, as the game has recently been named. The rivalry has blossomed in the 2000s due to both clubs participating in the Conference North and the close proximity between the two cathedral cities. The two sides have met 104 times during their history. However, since Worcester City's resignation from the National League due to financial problems, the clubs have not met since 2017.

=== Hereford ===
A local rivalry had existed with Hereford United until the club dissolved in 2014. The sides had met 42 times between 1939 and 1971. A new club set up called Hereford F.C. joined Midland Football League, eventually rising to meet Gloucester City in the National League North.
