= Cinderford Town A.F.C. =

English football club

Coordinates: 51°49′36.790″N 2°29′35.869″W

Cinderford Town
- Full name: Cinderford Town Association Football Club
- Nickname: The Town or The Foresters
- Founded: 1922
- Ground: Causeway Ground, Cinderford
- Capacity: 3,500 (250 seated)
- Chairman: Nick Simonds
- Manager: Stephen Cleal
- League: Hellenic League Premier Division
- 2024–25: Southern League Division One South, 22nd of 22 (relegated)
Home colours	Away colours

Cinderford Town Association Football Club is a football club based in Cinderford in Gloucestershire, England. Affiliated to the Gloucestershire County FA, they are currently members of the Hellenic League Premier Division and play at the Causeway Ground.

== History ==
The modern club was formed in 1922 and joined the Gloucestershire Northern Senior League. They were runners-up in 1935–36 and 1937–38, before winning the league in 1939–39. They subsequently joined the Bristol Charity League, but the league closed down two weeks into the 1939–40 season due to World War II. After the war the club joined Division Two of the Western League. After winning Division Two in 1956–57 they were promoted to Division One. However, the club left the league at the end of the 1958–59 season.

Cinderford subsequently rejoined the Gloucestershire Northern Senior League, and were champions in 1960–61 and runners-up in the next two seasons. They joined the Western Division of the Warwickshire Combination in 1963, and were both League Cup winners and Western Division champions in 1964–65, after which they moved up to the Premier Division of the West Midlands (Regional) League in 1965. In 1968–69 the club reached the League Cup final, drawing 1–1 with Kidderminster Harriers, with the league declaring them joint winners. In 1969 the club transferred to the Gloucestershire County League, finishing as runners-up in their first season, and again in 1971–72 and 1973–74. In 1974 they joined Division One of the Midland Combination, which became the Premier Division in 1983. They won the League Cup in 1982–83, beating Bridgnorth Town in the final. However, they returned to the Gloucestershire County League at the end of the 1983–84 season. In 1990 the club joined Division One of the Hellenic League, which they won at the first attempt, earning promotion to the Premier Division. After winning the Premier Division, the Premier Division Cup and the Floodlit Cup in 1994–95, the club were promoted to Division One South of the Southern League.

The 1995–96 season saw Cinderford reach the first round of the FA Cup for the first time. After beating Bromsgrove Rovers 2–1, they lost 3–0 at Gravesend & Northfleet in a second round replay. The club were transferred to the Division One Midlands in 1998, and back to the renamed Division One Western in 1999. In 2000–01 the club won the Gloucestershire Senior Cup, beating Bristol City 1–0 in the final. They were moved back to the Division One Midlands in 2006, before returning to Division One South & West in two years later. In 2015–16 they won the division and were promoted to the Premier Division. The club initially tried to refuse promotion due to concerns about increased costs, but this was rejected by the Football Association.

In 2016–17 Cinderford finished bottom of the Premier Division and were relegated to Division One West. In 2018–19 the club finished fifth in the renamed Division One South, qualifying for the promotion play-offs. After beating Cirencester Town 2–1 in the semi-finals, they lost 3–1 to Yate Town in the final. They finished second-from-bottom of the division in 2022–23 and were relegated to the Premier Division of the Hellenic League. The following season saw them finish fifth in the Premier Division, before beating Corsham Town in the play-off semi-finals and then winning the play-off final against Royal Wootton Bassett Town 4–0 to earn promotion back to Division One South of the Southern League.

== Ground ==
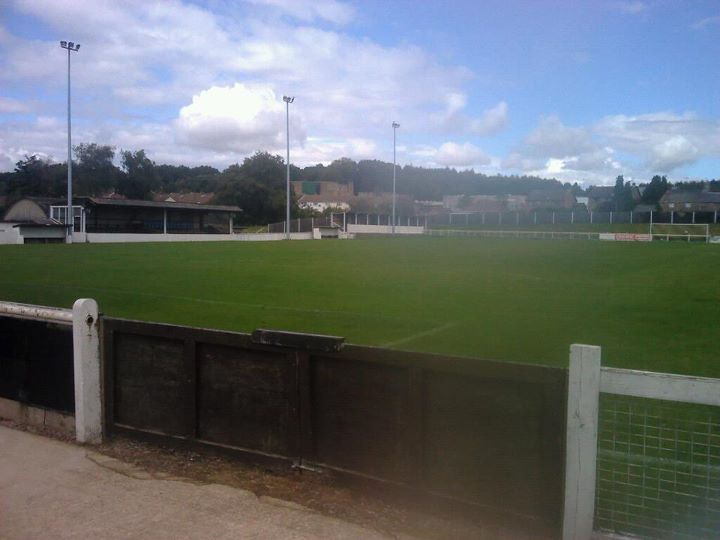
The Causeway Ground

The club initially played at the Royal Oak ground behind the eponymous public house, before moving to Mousel Barn in 1932. When the club started playing again after World War II they discovered that the ground had been sold off. Two years later they bought three fields on the Causeway, where the Causeway Ground was subsequently built. A stand was erected using a converted tool shed, and two new stands were built in 1949.

Floodlights were installed in 1991 and officially inaugurated with a friendly match against Birmingham City. During the 1993–94 season the 18-foot slope from corner to corner was rectified, with the club playing at Worrall Hill while the work was carried out, around five miles from Cinderford. The levelling of the pitch meant banking was created behind one goal and along the side of the pitch opposite the main stand. The ground currently has a capacity of 3,500, of which 250 is seated and 1,000 covered.

== Management ==
Position	Name
Chairman	Nick Simonds
Manager	Matthew Driscoll
Assistant manager	Sooty Cleal
Coach	
Physiotherapist	Vacant
Kit Manager	Phil Tompkins
Head of Youth	Rich Wilkins
Under 18's Manager	Rich Wilkins

== Honours ==
- Southern League
  - Division One South & West champions 2015–16
- Western League
  - Division Two champions 1956–57
- Hellenic League
  - Premier Division champions 1994–95
  - Premier Division Cup winners 1994–95
  - Floodlit Cup winners 1994–95
  - Division One champions 1990–91
- Warwickshire Combination
  - Western Division champions 1964–65
  - League Cup winners 1964–65
- West Midlands (Regional) League
  - League Cup winners 1968–69 (joint)
- Midland Combination
  - League Cup winners 1982–83
- Gloucestershire Northern Senior League
  - Champions 1938–39, 1960–61
- Gloucestershire Senior Cup
  - Winners 2000–01

== Records ==
- Best league performance: 1st in Southern League Division One South & West, 2015–16
- Best FA Cup performance: Second round, 1995–96
- Best FA Trophy performance: Second round, 2000–01, 2001–02, 2003–04
- Best FA Vase performance: Third round, 1991–92, 2025–26
- Record attendance: 4,850 vs Minehead, Western League Division Two, 1957
- Biggest victory: 13–0 vs Cam Mills, 1938–39
- Heaviest defeat: 10–0 vs Sutton Coldfield, 1978–79
- Most appearances: Russell Bowles, 528

== Previous managers ==
Name	From	To
Jimmy Rogers	1962	
Tim Harris	1990	1997
Chris Price	1997	
Mike Cook	2004	2006
Keith Knight	2007	2007
Paul Weeks	2009	2014
Steve Peters	2011	2014
David Bird (Caretaker)	2014	2014
John Brough	2014	2016
Chris Burns / Allan Gough	2016	2016
Brian Burke / Rich Wilkins (Caretakers)	2016	2016
Paul Michael	2016	2020
Stephen Cleal	2020	2021
Alex Sykes	2021	2023

== See also ==
- Cinderford Town A.F.C. players
- Cinderford Town A.F.C. managers
