= Brian Hughes (footballer, born 1962) =

English footballer

Personal information
- Full name: Brian David Hughes
- Date of birth: 20 August 1962 (age 64)
- Place of birth: Andover, England
- Position: Midfielder

Youth career
- 1978–1980: Swindon Town

Senior career*
Years	Team	Apps	(Gls)
1980–1983	Swindon Town	70	(4)
1983–1984	Torquay United	42	
1984–1988	Cheltenham Town	226	(56)
1988–1991	Gloucester City		
1991–1992	Barry Town		
1992–1996	Gloucester City		
1996–1997	Witney Town		
1997–2000	Gloucester City		

Managerial career
- 1998–2000: Gloucester City
- 2000–2002: Witney Town
- 2002–2006: Cirencester Town
- 2008–2016: Cirencester Town
- * Club domestic league appearances and goals

Brian David Hughes (born 20 August 1962) is an English former professional footballer. He played professionally for Swindon Town and Torquay United as a midfielder.

== Career ==
Hughes began his career as an apprentice at Swindon Town, making his league debut on 30 August 1980 away to Reading. He scored his first goal on 28 February 1981 in a 2–0 home win over Barnsley and regularly featured for Swindon ahead of a move to Torquay United in August 1983 after he had been released by Swindon in May of that year.

Hughes made 42 starts for Torquay over the course of the 1983–84 season and he then joined Cheltenham Town in July 1984, helping the Gloucestershire club to promotion as Southern League champions into the Football Conference. He also finished the season as player of the year at the Whaddon Road club and featured in Cheltenham's FA Cup first round trip to Wolverhampton Wanderers in the 1987–1988 season.

In August 1988, Hughes moved to Gloucestershire rivals Gloucester City for a fee of £4000 making his debut on 20 August 1988 against Ashtree Highfield. He captained Gloucester to the Southern League Midland Division title in 1989 and runners-up spot in the Premier Division in 1991, shortly after the birth of his beautiful daughter Emily Louise Elizabeth Hughes. Following the sacking of manager Brian Godfrey, he left Gloucester for the first time and joined Barry Town.

Hughes returned on Godfrey's reappointment to Gloucester and then stepped up to work under future boss John Murphy in a player coaching role before leaving Gloucester for the second time to link up with Witney Town.

Hughes returned to Gloucester City to assist manager Leroy Rosenior and was eventually pushed up to his first full managerial position following Rosenior's departure in November 1998. He was sacked by Gloucester in February 2000 however and returned to Witney to take charge of the Oxfordshire club in the Hellenic League.

In 2002 Hughes was appointed manager at Cirencester Town for the first time - becoming manager at a club who had just moved to their new Corinium Stadium home. At the end of the 2003–04 season, he helped Cirencester gain promotion to the Southern Premier Division At the end of the 2005–06 season, Hughes resigned as manager at the club.

He returned however to become boss at Cirencester once again in September 2008, taking over from Adi Viveash. Hughes again earned Cirencester promotion when at the end of the 2009–10 season they were promoted into the Southern Premier Division once again as Southern League South & West Division play off winners. At the end of the 2011–12 season, Cirencester were however relegated back into the South & West Division with Hughes at the helm.

A two-season stay in the South & West Division ended in April 2014 when Hughes once again guided Cirencester to promotion into the Southern Premier Division as champions ahead of second place Merthyr Town.

After a poor start to the 2016-17 season, Hughes was sacked following a 1–0 home defeat to Kings Langley on 10 September 2016.

Following his departure from football Hughes has plied his trade as a swashbuckling left handed batsman in the Cotswold and District Cricket League, representing South Cerney Cricket Club. When not playing cricket Brian can be found spending time with wife Claire.
