= 1989–90 Hellenic Football League =

The 1989–90 Hellenic Football League season was the 37th in the history of the Hellenic Football League, a football competition in England.

== Premier Division ==
Hellenic Football League Premier Division
- Season: 1989–90
- Champions: Newport
- Promoted: Newport
- Relegated: Supermarine
- Matches: 306
- Goals: 925 (3.02 per match)

The Premier Division featured 14 clubs which competed in the division last season, along with four new clubs:

- Almondsbury Picksons, promoted from Division One
- Headington Amateurs, promoted from Division One
- Newport, reformed club after Newport County folded
- Ruislip Park, joined after Ruislip from the Southern Football League left the league.

Also, Penhill changed name to Swindon Athletic.

=== League table ===
Pos	Team	Pld	W	D	L	GF	GA	GD	Pts	Promotion or relegation
1	Newport	34	23	6	5	71	28	+43	75	Promoted to the Southern Football League
2	Shortwood United	34	20	7	7	81	39	+42	67	
3	Abingdon United	34	20	7	7	66	33	+33	67	
4	Sharpness	34	16	9	9	76	59	+17	57	Resigned from the league
5	Fairford Town	34	17	6	11	59	42	+17	57	
6	Bicester Town	34	15	11	8	43	30	+13	56	
7	Almondsbury Picksons	34	15	9	10	60	41	+19	54	
8	Kintbury Rangers	34	14	8	12	37	45	−8	50	
9	Pegasus Juniors	34	14	6	14	47	62	−15	48	
10	Swindon Athletic	34	12	11	11	48	36	+12	47	
11	Rayners Lane	34	12	6	16	43	45	−2	42	
12	Headington Amateurs	34	9	14	11	43	44	−1	41	
13	Moreton Town	34	11	8	15	55	65	−10	41	
14	Wantage Town	34	10	10	14	52	58	−6	40	
15	Didcot Town	34	11	6	17	54	48	+6	39	
16	Bishop's Cleeve	34	7	9	18	33	61	−28	30	
17	Supermarine	34	6	5	23	25	72	−47	23	Relegated to Division One
18	Ruislip Park	34	2	6	26	32	117	−85	12	Resigned from the league

Source: fchd
Rules for classification: 1) points; 2) goal difference; 3) number of goals scored.

== Division One ==
Hellenic Football League Division One
- Season: 1989–90
- Champions: Carterton Town
- Promoted: Carterton Town; Milton United
- Matches: 240
- Goals: 731 (3.05 per match)

Division One featured 13 clubs which competed in the division last season, along with three new clubs:

- Milton United, joined from the North Berks League
- Viking Sports, relegated from the Premier Division
- Wallingford Town, relegated from the Premier Division

=== League table ===
Pos	Team	Pld	W	D	L	GF	GA	GD	Pts	Promotion or relegation
1	Carterton Town	30	24	4	2	72	16	+56	76	Promoted to the Premier Division
2	Milton United	30	21	3	6	77	22	+55	66	Promoted to the Premier Division
3	Cheltenham Town reserves	30	19	2	9	78	56	+22	59	Resigned from the league
4	Kidlington	30	18	3	9	52	34	+18	57	
5	Chipping Norton Town	30	15	8	7	44	26	+18	53	
6	Purton	30	14	8	8	55	36	+19	50	
7	Wootton Bassett Town	30	13	8	9	52	35	+17	47	
8	Wallingford Town	30	9	12	9	37	37	0	39	
9	Viking Sports	30	11	5	14	30	43	−13	38	
10	Highworth Town	30	9	7	14	44	50	−6	34	
11	Cirencester Town	30	8	10	12	38	53	−15	34	
12	Clanfield	30	7	9	14	31	57	−26	30	
13	Easington Sports	30	7	4	19	33	68	−35	25	
14	Lambourn Sports	30	5	7	18	27	60	−33	22	
15	The Herd	30	4	9	17	27	62	−35	21	
16	Cheltenham Saracens	30	3	7	20	34	76	−42	16	

Source: fchd
Rules for classification: 1) points; 2) goal difference; 3) number of goals scored.
