= 1986–87 Hellenic Football League =

The 1986–87 Hellenic Football League season was the 34th in the history of the Hellenic Football League, a football competition in England.

== Premier Division ==
Hellenic Football League Premier Division
- Season: 1986–87
- Champions: Abingdon Town
- Promoted: Hounslow
- Relegated: Wantage Town
- Matches: 306
- Goals: 931 (3.04 per match)

The Premier Division featured 16 clubs which competed in the division last season, along with two new clubs, promoted from Division One:

- Penhill
- Viking Sports

=== League table ===
Pos	Team	Pld	W	D	L	GF	GA	GD	Pts	Promotion or relegation
1	Abingdon Town	34	26	6	2	85	27	+58	84	
2	Hounslow	34	25	2	7	73	42	+31	77	Promoted to the Southern Football League
3	Shortwood United	34	20	6	8	79	38	+41	66	
4	Viking Sports	34	17	4	13	67	51	+16	55	
5	Sharpness	34	15	6	13	72	52	+20	51	
6	Abingdon United	34	14	9	11	49	37	+12	51	
7	Morris Motors	34	11	14	9	43	40	+3	47	
8	Moreton Town	34	13	8	13	47	49	−2	47	
9	Penhill	34	12	10	12	50	49	+1	46	
10	Yate Town	34	11	12	11	53	46	+7	45	
11	Supermarine	34	12	5	17	37	51	−14	41	
12	Pegasus Juniors	34	10	10	14	53	56	−3	40	
13	Rayners Lane	34	9	12	13	35	45	−10	39	
14	Bicester Town	34	8	11	15	31	50	−19	35	
15	Fairford Town	34	9	8	17	39	77	−38	35	
16	Wallingford Town	34	10	4	20	42	64	−22	34	
17	Thame United	34	9	7	18	50	84	−34	34	
18	Wantage Town	34	5	6	23	26	73	−47	21	Relegated to Division One

Source: fchd
Rules for classification: 1) points; 2) goal difference; 3) number of goals scored.

== Division One ==
Hellenic Football League Division One
- Season: 1986–87
- Champions: Bishop's Cleeve
- Promoted: Bishop's Cleeve; Didcot Town
- Matches: 306
- Goals: 960 (3.14 per match)

Division One featured twelve clubs which competed in the division last season, along with six new clubs:

- Almondsbury Greenway, relegated from the Premier Division
- Carterton Town, joined from the Witney and District League
- Cheltenham Saracens, joined from the Cheltenham League
- Cheltenham Town reserves, transferred from the Midland Combination Division One
- Chipping Norton Town, joined from the Oxfordshire Senior League
- Purton, joined from the Wiltshire League

=== League table ===
Pos	Team	Pld	W	D	L	GF	GA	GD	Pts	Promotion or relegation
1	Bishop's Cleeve	34	23	3	8	62	34	+28	72	Promoted to the Premier Division
2	Cheltenham Town reserves	34	21	8	5	73	32	+41	71	
3	Didcot Town	34	19	8	7	71	36	+35	65	Promoted to the Premier Division
4	Clanfield	34	18	9	7	64	32	+32	63	
5	Kidlington	34	19	6	9	72	44	+28	63	
6	Purton	34	16	8	10	76	44	+32	56	
7	Lambourn Sports	34	15	8	11	68	55	+13	53	
8	Highworth Town	34	14	10	10	65	53	+12	52	
9	Badminton Picksons	34	12	10	12	57	66	−9	46	Merged into Almondsbury Picksons
10	Carterton Town	34	13	7	14	41	50	−9	46	
11	Cirencester Town	34	12	7	15	38	50	−12	43	
12	Easington Sports	34	12	6	16	53	69	−16	42	
13	Chipping Norton Town	34	9	6	19	47	66	−19	33	
14	Cheltenham Saracens	34	10	3	21	35	84	−49	33	
15	Hazells	34	7	9	18	36	55	−19	30	Transferred to the Chiltonian League
16	Kintbury Rangers	34	7	9	18	37	60	−23	30	
17	Almondsbury Greenway	34	7	8	19	32	56	−24	29	
18	Avon Bradford	34	7	5	22	33	74	−41	26	

Source: fchd
Rules for classification: 1) points; 2) goal difference; 3) number of goals scored.
