= 1987–88 Hellenic Football League =

The 1987–88 Hellenic Football League season was the 35th in the history of the Hellenic Football League, a football competition in England.

== Premier Division ==
Hellenic Football League Premier Division
- Season: 1987–88
- Champions: Yate Town
- Matches: 306
- Goals: 913 (2.98 per match)

The Premier Division featured 16 clubs that competed in the division last season, along with two new clubs, promoted from Division One:

- Bishop's Cleeve
- Didcot Town

=== League table ===
| Pos | Team | Pld | W | D | L | GF | GA | GD | Pts | Promotion or relegation |
|---|---|---|---|---|---|---|---|---|---|---|
| 1 | Yate Town | 34 | 25 | 7 | 2 | 73 | 20 | +53 | 82 | |
| 2 | Abingdon Town | 34 | 22 | 8 | 4 | 76 | 31 | +45 | 74 | Transferred to the Spartan League |
| 3 | Shortwood United | 34 | 20 | 8 | 6 | 78 | 45 | +33 | 68 | |
| 4 | Abingdon United | 34 | 17 | 11 | 6 | 58 | 36 | +22 | 62 | |
| 5 | Didcot Town | 34 | 13 | 12 | 9 | 55 | 47 | +8 | 51 | |
| 6 | Penhill | 34 | 14 | 9 | 11 | 47 | 44 | +3 | 51 | |
| 7 | Sharpness | 34 | 13 | 11 | 10 | 63 | 48 | +15 | 50 | |
| 8 | Fairford Town | 34 | 12 | 10 | 12 | 44 | 38 | +6 | 46 | |
| 9 | Thame United | 34 | 11 | 13 | 10 | 54 | 54 | 0 | 46 | Transferred to the South Midlands League |
| 10 | Bicester Town | 34 | 12 | 8 | 14 | 42 | 43 | −1 | 44 | |
| 11 | Viking Sports | 34 | 11 | 8 | 15 | 44 | 64 | −20 | 41 | |
| 12 | Moreton Town | 34 | 11 | 5 | 18 | 41 | 57 | −16 | 38 | |
| 13 | Rayners Lane | 34 | 9 | 8 | 17 | 42 | 64 | −22 | 35 | |
| 14 | Morris Motors | 34 | 8 | 11 | 15 | 36 | 63 | −27 | 35 | Resigned from the league |
| 15 | Supermarine | 34 | 8 | 9 | 17 | 46 | 58 | −12 | 33 | |
| 16 | Bishop's Cleeve | 34 | 7 | 11 | 16 | 42 | 70 | −28 | 32 | |
| 17 | Pegasus Juniors | 34 | 9 | 3 | 22 | 46 | 61 | −15 | 30 | |
| 18 | Wallingford Town | 34 | 5 | 6 | 23 | 26 | 69 | −43 | 21 | |

Source: fchd
Rules for classification: 1) points; 2) goal difference; 3) number of goals scored.

== Division One ==
Hellenic Football League Division One
- Season: 1987–88
- Champions: Wantage Town
- Promoted: Wantage Town; Kintbury Rangers
- Matches: 240
- Goals: 738 (3.08 per match)

Division One featured 14 clubs which competed in the division last season, along with two new clubs:

- The Herd, joined from the Cheltenham League
- Wantage Town, relegated from the Premier Division

Also, Almondsbury Greenway changed name to Almondsbury Picksons.

=== League table ===
| Pos | Team | Pld | W | D | L | GF | GA | GD | Pts | Promotion or relegation |
|---|---|---|---|---|---|---|---|---|---|---|
| 1 | Cheltenham Town reserves | 30 | 20 | 6 | 4 | 70 | 23 | +47 | 66 | |
| 2 | Wantage Town | 30 | 17 | 7 | 6 | 55 | 29 | +26 | 58 | Promoted to the Premier Division |
| 3 | Kintbury Rangers | 30 | 16 | 9 | 5 | 48 | 26 | +22 | 57 | Promoted to the Premier Division |
| 4 | Almondsbury Picksons | 30 | 16 | 7 | 7 | 51 | 33 | +18 | 55 | |
| 5 | Lambourn Sports | 30 | 15 | 5 | 10 | 53 | 52 | +1 | 50 | |
| 6 | Kidlington | 30 | 13 | 7 | 10 | 51 | 45 | +6 | 46 | |
| 7 | Highworth Town | 30 | 12 | 6 | 12 | 52 | 57 | −5 | 42 | |
| 8 | Clanfield | 30 | 13 | 2 | 15 | 51 | 59 | −8 | 41 | |
| 9 | Cirencester Town | 30 | 11 | 7 | 12 | 43 | 51 | −8 | 40 | |
| 10 | Carterton Town | 30 | 10 | 9 | 11 | 46 | 54 | −8 | 39 | |
| 11 | Chipping Norton Town | 30 | 8 | 11 | 11 | 49 | 45 | +4 | 35 | |
| 12 | Purton | 30 | 9 | 8 | 13 | 40 | 39 | +1 | 35 | |
| 13 | The Herd | 30 | 9 | 7 | 14 | 47 | 47 | 0 | 34 | |
| 14 | Cheltenham Saracens | 30 | 7 | 4 | 19 | 22 | 54 | −32 | 25 | |
| 15 | Easington Sports | 30 | 5 | 10 | 15 | 26 | 60 | −34 | 25 | |
| 16 | Avon Bradford | 30 | 3 | 7 | 20 | 34 | 64 | −30 | 16 | Resigned from the league |

Source: fchd
Rules for classification: 1) points; 2) goal difference; 3) number of goals scored.
