= 1985–86 Hellenic Football League =

The 1985–86 Hellenic Football League season was the 33rd in the history of the Hellenic Football League, a football competition in England.

== Premier Division ==
Hellenic Football League Premier Division
- Season: 1985–86
- Champions: Sharpness
- Relegated: Almondsbury Greenway
- Matches: 306
- Goals: 960 (3.14 per match)

The Premier Division featured 16 clubs which competed in the division last season, along with two new clubs, promoted from Division One:

- Pegasus Juniors
- Yate Town

=== League table ===
Pos	Team	Pld	W	D	L	GF	GA	GD	Pts	Promotion or relegation
1	Sharpness	34	24	4	6	88	41	+47	76	
2	Shortwood United	34	23	2	9	79	43	+36	71	
3	Hounslow	34	20	6	8	83	44	+39	66	
4	Abingdon Town	34	19	8	7	60	36	+24	65	
5	Supermarine	34	21	2	11	56	48	+8	65	
6	Rayners Lane	34	18	7	9	65	48	+17	60 (Note: Rayners Lane were deducted one point.)	
7	Abingdon United	34	17	8	9	46	33	+13	59	
8	Yate Town	34	15	8	11	57	44	+13	53	
9	Moreton Town	34	15	8	11	51	40	+11	53	
10	Thame United	34	13	8	13	51	54	−3	47	
11	Pegasus Juniors	34	13	5	16	56	64	−8	44	
12	Wallingford Town	34	12	5	17	45	56	−11	41	
13	Fairford Town	34	8	8	18	39	49	−10	32	
14	Morris Motors	34	7	10	17	30	44	−14	31	
15	Bicester Town	34	9	3	22	46	79	−33	30	
16	Wantage Town	34	7	6	21	40	65	−25	27	
17	Almondsbury Greenway	34	7	3	24	34	82	−48	24	Relegated to Division One
18	Maidenhead Town	34	5	5	24	34	90	−56	20	Resigned to the Chiltonian League

Source: fchd
Rules for classification: 1) points; 2) goal difference; 3) number of goals scored.

== Division One ==
Hellenic Football League Division One
- Season: 1985–86
- Champions: Viking Sports
- Promoted: Viking Sports; Penhill
- Matches: 240
- Goals: 875 (3.65 per match)

Division One featured 13 clubs which competed in the division last season, along with three new clubs:

- Clanfield, relegated from the Premier Division
- Didcot Town, relegated from the Premier Division
- Penhill, joined from the Wiltshire League

=== League table ===
Pos	Team	Pld	W	D	L	GF	GA	GD	Pts	Promotion or relegation
1	Viking Sports	30	22	5	3	100	37	+63	71	Promoted to the Premier Division
2	Penhill	30	22	4	4	78	24	+54	70	Promoted to the Premier Division
3	Bishop's Cleeve	30	17	6	7	72	45	+27	57	
4	Didcot Town	30	16	7	7	78	42	+36	55	
5	Highworth Town	30	15	6	9	61	38	+23	51	
6	Kidlington	30	13	8	9	52	48	+4	47	
7	Clanfield	30	11	8	11	53	56	−3	41	
8	Hazells	30	8	12	10	38	46	−8	36	
9	Badminton Picksons	30	8	10	12	39	62	−23	34	
10	Lambourn Sports	30	8	9	13	43	56	−13	33	
11	Pressed Steel	30	9	6	15	44	62	−18	33	Resigned from the league
12	Cirencester Town	30	8	8	14	52	54	−2	32	
13	Avon Bradford	30	6	13	11	38	62	−24	31	
14	Easington Sports	30	8	4	18	50	81	−31	28	
15	Kintbury Rangers	30	4	10	16	38	67	−29	22	
16	AFC Aldermaston	30	5	4	21	39	95	−56	19	Resigned from the league

Source: fchd
Rules for classification: 1) points; 2) goal difference; 3) number of goals scored.
