= 1988–89 Hellenic Football League =

The 1988–89 Hellenic Football League season was the 36th in the history of the Hellenic Football League, a football competition in England.

== Premier Division ==
Hellenic Football League Premier Division
- Season: 1988–89
- Champions: Yate Town
- Promoted: Yate Town
- Relegated: Wallingford Town; Viking Sports
- Matches: 272
- Goals: 778 (2.86 per match)

The Premier Division featured 15 clubs which competed in the division last season, along with two new clubs, promoted from Division One:

- Kintbury Rangers
- Wantage Town

=== League table ===
Pos	Team	Pld	W	D	L	GF	GA	GD	Pts	Promotion or relegation
1	Yate Town	32	26	5	1	75	16	+59	83	Promoted to the Southern Football League
2	Sharpness	32	21	8	3	77	31	+46	71	
3	Abingdon United	32	18	6	8	54	26	+28	60	
4	Fairford Town	32	15	7	10	45	40	+5	52	
5	Pegasus Juniors	32	15	6	11	60	55	+5	51	
6	Bicester Town	32	14	8	10	70	40	+30	50	
7	Moreton Town	32	12	10	10	51	47	+4	46	
8	Didcot Town	32	12	10	10	38	36	+2	46	
9	Penhill	32	13	4	15	41	36	+5	43	
10	Bishop's Cleeve	32	12	5	15	32	54	−22	41	
11	Shortwood United	32	11	7	14	40	47	−7	40	
12	Wantage Town	32	9	9	14	42	57	−15	36	
13	Rayners Lane	32	8	7	17	41	60	−19	31	
14	Supermarine	32	8	5	19	29	57	−28	29	
15	Kintbury Rangers	32	6	8	18	24	51	−27	26	
16	Wallingford Town	32	6	8	18	31	64	−33	26	Relegated to Division One
17	Viking Sports	32	6	7	19	28	61	−33	25	Relegated to Division One

Source: fchd
Rules for classification: 1) points; 2) goal difference; 3) number of goals scored.

== Division One ==
Hellenic Football League Division One
- Season: 1988–89
- Champions: Almondsbury Picksons
- Promoted: Almondsbury Picksons; Headington Amateurs
- Matches: 210
- Goals: 677 (3.22 per match)

Division One featured 13 clubs which competed in the division last season, along with two new clubs:

- Headington Amateurs, joined from the Oxfordshire Senior League
- Wootton Bassett Town, joined from the Wiltshire League

=== League table ===
Pos	Team	Pld	W	D	L	GF	GA	GD	Pts	Promotion or relegation
1	Almondsbury Picksons	28	20	4	4	66	20	+46	64	Promoted to the Premier Division
2	Headington Amateurs	28	19	5	4	49	19	+30	62	Promoted to the Premier Division
3	Lambourn Sports	28	14	7	7	53	40	+13	49	
4	Highworth Town	28	12	8	8	52	41	+11	44	
5	Wootton Bassett Town	28	11	7	10	50	41	+9	40	
6	Purton	28	11	7	10	37	42	−5	40	
7	Cheltenham Town reserves	28	12	3	13	53	50	+3	39	
8	Easington Sports	28	9	12	7	41	43	−2	39	
9	Chipping Norton Town	28	11	6	11	45	49	−4	39	
10	Clanfield	28	9	8	11	49	55	−6	35	
11	Kidlington	28	10	5	13	41	57	−16	35	
12	Cheltenham Saracens	28	6	10	12	33	45	−12	28	
13	The Herd	28	8	4	16	44	62	−18	28	
14	Carterton Town	28	7	5	16	36	54	−18	26	
15	Cirencester Town	28	3	5	20	28	59	−31	14	

Source: fchd
Rules for classification: 1) points; 2) goal difference; 3) number of goals scored.
