= 1990–91 Hellenic Football League =

The 1990–91 Hellenic Football League season was the 38th in the history of the Hellenic Football League, a football competition in England.

== Premier Division ==
Hellenic Football League Premier Division
- Season: 1990–91
- Champions: Milton United
- Relegated: Wantage Town
- Matches: 306
- Goals: 954 (3.12 per match)

The Premier Division featured 14 clubs which competed in the division last season, along with four new clubs:

- Banbury United, relegated from Southern Football League
- Carterton Town, promoted from Division One
- Milton United, promoted from Division One
- Hounslow, demoted from the Southern Football League

=== League table ===
Pos	Team	Pld	W	D	L	GF	GA	GD	Pts	Promotion or relegation
1	Milton United	34	20	11	3	66	26	+40	71	
2	Fairford Town	34	22	5	7	69	38	+31	71	
3	Bicester Town	34	19	6	9	70	37	+33	63	
4	Didcot Town	34	18	8	8	65	30	+35	62	
5	Headington Amateurs	34	18	8	8	54	34	+20	62	
6	Shortwood United	34	18	5	11	77	60	+17	59	
7	Abingdon United	34	17	6	11	57	37	+20	57	
8	Banbury United	34	17	4	13	58	51	+7	55	
9	Hounslow	34	16	5	13	63	47	+16	53	Merged with Feltham (Isthmian League Division Two South) to create Feltham & Hounslow Borough in 1991-92 Isthmian League Division Three
10	Almondsbury Picksons	34	13	9	12	57	58	−1	48	
11	Kintbury Rangers	34	12	8	14	54	57	−3	44	
12	Carterton Town	34	10	7	17	49	62	−13	37	
13	Rayners Lane	34	10	6	18	34	63	−29	36	
14	Pegasus Juniors	34	8	7	19	46	68	−22	31	
15	Bishop's Cleeve	34	9	8	17	43	79	−36	35	
16	Swindon Athletic	34	6	10	18	31	64	−33	28	
17	Moreton Town	34	5	7	22	30	73	−43	22	
18	Wantage Town	34	4	8	22	31	70	−39	20	Relegated to Division One

Source: fchd
Rules for classification: 1) points; 2) goal difference; 3) number of goals scored.

== Division One ==
Hellenic Football League Division One
- Season: 1990–91
- Champions: Cinderford Town
- Promoted: Cinderford Town; Cirencester Town
- Matches: 240
- Goals: 778 (3.24 per match)

Division One featured 13 clubs which competed in the division last season, along with three new clubs:

- Cinderford Town, joined from the Gloucestershire County League
- North Leigh, joined from the Witney and District League
- Supermarine, relegated from the Premier Division

Also, The Herd changed name to Cirencester United.

=== League table ===
Pos	Team	Pld	W	D	L	GF	GA	GD	Pts	Promotion or relegation
1	Cinderford Town	30	24	3	3	94	22	+72	75	Promoted to the Premier Division
2	Cirencester Town	30	22	5	3	66	21	+45	71	Promoted to the Premier Division
3	Purton	30	18	6	6	66	28	+38	60	
4	North Leigh	30	18	3	9	83	43	+40	57	
5	Wallingford Town	30	17	5	8	61	35	+26	56	
6	Viking Sports	30	15	10	5	53	20	+33	55	Transferred to the Combined Counties League
7	Highworth Town	30	15	4	11	45	49	−4	49	
8	Wootton Bassett Town	30	11	8	11	32	36	−4	41	
9	Cirencester United	30	11	7	12	48	51	−3	40	
10	Easington Sports	30	10	7	13	52	51	+1	37	
11	Clanfield	30	9	8	13	43	44	−1	35	
12	Kidlington	30	6	8	16	36	56	−20	26	
13	Supermarine	30	7	5	18	29	53	−24	26	
14	Cheltenham Saracens	30	6	7	17	31	44	−13	25	
15	Chipping Norton Town	30	4	1	25	12	122	−110	13	
16	Lambourn Sports	30	2	3	25	27	103	−76	9	

Source: fchd
Rules for classification: 1) points; 2) goal difference; 3) number of goals scored.
