= 1991–92 Hellenic Football League =

The 1991–92 Hellenic Football League season was the 39th in the history of the Hellenic Football League, a football competition in England.

== Premier Division ==
Hellenic Football League Premier Division
- Season: 1991–92
- Champions: Shortwood United
- Relegated: Bishop's Cleeve; Carterton Town
- Matches: 306
- Goals: 1,005 (3.28 per match)

The Premier Division featured 16 clubs which competed in the division last season, along with two new clubs, promoted from Division One:

- Cinderford Town
- Cirencester Town

=== League table ===
Pos	Team	Pld	W	D	L	GF	GA	GD	Pts	Promotion or relegation
1	Shortwood United	34	25	4	5	83	44	+39	79	
2	Cirencester Town	34	23	9	2	73	23	+50	78	
3	Almondsbury Picksons	34	19	7	8	63	38	+25	64	
4	Milton United	34	18	9	7	67	44	+23	63	
5	Cinderford Town	34	16	9	9	57	41	+16	57	
6	Abingdon United	34	17	5	12	54	40	+14	56	
7	Didcot Town	34	16	6	12	70	48	+22	54	
8	Swindon Athletic	34	15	9	10	61	44	+17	54	
9	Bicester Town	34	12	12	10	44	42	+2	48	
10	Banbury United	34	14	5	15	55	55	0	47	
11	Fairford Town	34	12	9	13	72	55	+17	45	
12	Headington Amateurs	34	10	9	15	48	59	−11	39	
13	Pegasus Juniors	34	11	5	18	66	68	−2	38	
14	Kintbury Rangers	34	9	8	17	47	59	−12	35	
15	Rayners Lane	34	9	8	17	50	75	−25	35	
16	Moreton Town	34	7	4	23	38	100	−62	25	
17	Carterton Town	34	6	6	22	32	74	−42	24	Relegated to Division One
18	Bishop's Cleeve	34	2	6	26	25	96	−71	12	Relegated to Division One

Source: fchd
Rules for classification: 1) points; 2) goal difference; 3) number of goals scored.

== Division One ==
Hellenic Football League Division One
- Season: 1991–92
- Champions: Wollen Sports
- Promoted: Wantage Town; Wollen Sports
- Matches: 272
- Goals: 956 (3.51 per match)

Division One featured 13 clubs which competed in the division last season, along with four new clubs:

- Tuffley Rovers, joined from the Gloucestershire County League
- Wantage Town, relegated from the Premier Division
- Wollen Sports
- Yarnton

=== League table ===
Pos	Team	Pld	W	D	L	GF	GA	GD	Pts	Promotion or relegation
1	Wollen Sports	32	26	4	2	96	28	+68	82	Promoted to the Premier Division
2	Wantage Town	32	23	6	3	83	32	+51	75	Promoted to the Premier Division
3	Tuffley Rovers	32	20	8	4	95	34	+61	68	
4	North Leigh	32	20	4	8	84	38	+46	64	
5	Cheltenham Saracens	32	15	7	10	70	45	+25	52	
6	Purton	32	14	7	11	48	40	+8	49	
7	Chipping Norton Town	32	13	6	13	54	56	−2	45	
8	Highworth Town	32	11	7	14	53	54	−1	40	
9	Cirencester United	32	11	7	14	49	55	−6	40	
10	Lambourn Sports	32	11	7	14	52	74	−22	40	
11	Yarnton	32	11	6	15	42	60	−18	39	
12	Wootton Bassett Town	32	10	8	14	45	59	−14	38	
13	Easington Sports	32	12	0	20	42	80	−38	36	
14	Kidlington	32	7	9	16	48	70	−22	30	
15	Wallingford Town	32	8	5	19	40	78	−38	29	
16	Clanfield	32	5	10	17	35	66	−31	25	
17	Supermarine	32	3	3	26	20	87	−67	12	Merged with Swindon Athletic

Source: fchd
Rules for classification: 1) points; 2) goal difference; 3) number of goals scored.
