= 1989–90 Southern Football League =

The 1989–90 Southern Football League season was the 87th in the history of the league, an English football competition.

Dover Athletic won the Premier Division but were not promoted due to ground grading issues and a place in the Football Conference was taken by runners-up Bath City. Four bottom clubs were relegated to the Southern and Midland divisions, while champions and runners-up of lower divisions get a places in the next Premier Division season. Banbury United, Hounslow, Sandwell Borough and Sheppey United left the league.

== Premier Division ==
The Premier Division consisted of 22 clubs, including 17 clubs from the previous season and five new clubs:

- Two clubs promoted from the Midland Division:
  - Atherstone United
  - Gloucester City
- Two clubs promoted from the Southern Division:
  - Chelmsford City
  - Gravesend & Northfleet
- Plus:
  - Weymouth, relegated from the Football Conference

=== League table ===
Southern Football League Premier Division
- Season: 1989–90
- Champions: Dover Athletic
- Promoted: Bath City
- Relegated: Alvechurch; Ashford Town (Kent); Corby Town; Gosport Borough
- Matches: 462
- Goals: 1,302 (2.82 per match)

Pos	Team	Pld	W	D	L	GF	GA	GD	Pts	Promotion or relegation
1	Dover Athletic	42	32	6	4	87	27	+60	102	
2	Bath City	42	30	8	4	81	28	+53	98	Promoted to the Football Conference
3	Dartford	42	26	9	7	80	35	+45	87	
4	Burton Albion	42	20	12	10	64	40	+24	72	
5	VS Rugby	42	19	12	11	51	35	+16	69	
6	Atherstone United	42	19	10	13	60	52	+8	67	
7	Gravesend & Northfleet	42	18	12	12	44	50	−6	66	
8	Cambridge City	42	17	11	14	76	56	+20	62	
9	Gloucester City	42	17	11	14	80	68	+12	62	
10	Bromsgrove Rovers	42	17	10	15	56	48	+8	61	
11	Moor Green	42	18	7	17	62	59	+3	61	
12	Wealdstone	42	16	9	17	55	54	+1	57	
13	Dorchester Town	42	16	7	19	52	67	−15	55	
14	Worcester City	42	15	10	17	62	63	−1	54 (Note: Worcester City were deducted one point.)	
15	Crawley Town	42	13	12	17	53	57	−4	51	
16	Waterlooville	42	13	10	19	63	81	−18	49	
17	Weymouth	42	11	13	18	50	70	−20	46	
18	Chelmsford City	42	11	10	21	52	72	−20	43	
19	Ashford Town (Kent)	42	10	7	25	43	75	−32	37	Relegated to the Southern Division
20	Corby Town	42	10	6	26	57	77	−20	36	Relegated to the Midland Division
21	Alvechurch	42	7	5	30	46	95	−49	26	Relegated to the Midland Division
22	Gosport Borough	42	6	5	31	28	93	−65	23	Relegated to the Southern Division

Source: fchd.com rsssf.com
Rules for classification: 1) points; 2) goal difference; 3) number of goals scored.

== Midland Division ==
The Midland Division consisted of 22 clubs, including 17 clubs from the previous season and five new clubs:

- Three clubs relegated from the Premier Division:
  - Bedworth United
  - Leicester United
  - Redditch United
- Plus:
  - Barry Town, transferred from the Welsh Football League
  - Racing Club Warwick, promoted from the Midland Football Combination

Also, at the end of the previous season Forest Green Rovers was renamed Stroud and Ashfield Hightree was renamed Sandwell Borough.

=== League table ===
Southern Football League Midland Division
- Season: 1989–90
- Champions: Halesowen Town
- Promoted: Halesowen Town; Rushden Town
- Relegated: Banbury United; Sandwell Borough
- Matches: 462
- Goals: 1,393 (3.02 per match)

Pos	Team	Pld	W	D	L	GF	GA	GD	Pts	Promotion or relegation
1	Halesowen Town	42	28	8	6	100	49	+51	92	Promoted to the Premier Division
2	Rushden Town	42	28	5	9	82	39	+43	89	Promoted to the Premier Division
3	Nuneaton Borough	42	26	7	9	81	47	+34	85	
4	Tamworth	42	22	8	12	82	70	+12	74	
5	Barry Town	42	21	8	13	67	53	+14	71	
6	Spalding United	42	20	7	15	73	63	+10	67	
7	Sutton Coldfield Town	42	18	10	14	72	69	+3	64	
8	Stourbridge	42	17	12	13	73	61	+12	63	
9	Dudley Town	42	18	9	15	69	64	+5	63	
10	Stroud	42	16	13	13	75	62	+13	61	
11	Leicester United	42	17	5	20	66	77	−11	56	
12	Bridgnorth Town	42	13	14	15	68	73	−5	53	
13	King's Lynn	42	16	5	21	57	69	−12	53	
14	Grantham Town	42	14	10	18	57	63	−6	52	
15	Bedworth United	42	14	9	19	50	60	−10	51	
16	Hednesford Town	42	11	14	17	50	62	−12	47	
17	Bilston Town	42	11	14	17	40	54	−14	47	
18	Redditch United	42	11	13	18	57	64	−7	46	
19	Racing Club Warwick	42	11	11	20	45	66	−21	44	
20	Willenhall Town	42	9	9	24	37	66	−29	36	
21	Banbury United	42	9	9	24	46	83	−37	34 (Note: Banbury United were deducted two points.)	Relegated to the Hellenic League
22	Sandwell Borough	42	6	12	24	46	79	−33	30	Relegated to the Midland Football Combination

Source: fchd.com rsssf.com
Rules for classification: 1) points; 2) goal difference; 3) number of goals scored.

== Southern Division ==
The Southern Division consisted of 22 clubs, including 18 clubs from the previous season and four new clubs:

- Bashley, promoted from the Wessex League
- Fareham Town, relegated from the Premier Division
- Hythe Town, promoted from the Kent League
- Yate Town, promoted from the Hellenic League

Also, at the end of the previous season Thanet United reverted name to Margate.

=== League table ===
Southern Football League Southern Division
- Season: 1989–90
- Champions: Bashley
- Promoted: Bashley; Poole Town
- Relegated: Sheppey United
- Matches: 462
- Goals: 1,315 (2.85 per match)

Pos	Team	Pld	W	D	L	GF	GA	GD	Pts	Promotion or relegation
1	Bashley	42	25	7	10	80	47	+33	82	Promoted to the Premier Division
2	Poole Town	42	23	8	11	85	60	+25	77	Promoted to the Premier Division
3	Buckingham Town	42	22	10	10	67	46	+21	76	
4	Dunstable	42	20	14	8	56	38	+18	74	
5	Salisbury	42	21	9	12	72	50	+22	72	
6	Hythe Town	42	20	12	10	69	48	+21	72	
7	Trowbridge Town	42	20	9	13	79	64	+15	69	
8	Hastings Town	42	20	9	13	64	54	+10	69	
9	Bury Town	42	18	12	12	76	62	+14	66	
10	Baldock Town	42	18	11	13	69	52	+17	65	
11	Burnham	42	17	11	14	77	52	+25	62	
12	Fareham Town	42	14	14	14	49	53	−4	56	
13	Yate Town	42	16	6	20	53	52	+1	54	
14	Witney Town	42	16	6	20	54	56	−2	54	
15	Canterbury City	42	14	10	18	52	52	0	52	
16	Margate	42	12	15	15	46	45	+1	51	
17	Folkestone Town	42	14	9	19	61	83	−22	51	Club folded
18	Andover	42	13	11	18	54	70	−16	50	
19	Hounslow	42	11	5	26	39	82	−43	38	Resigned to the Hellenic League
20	Erith & Belvedere	42	8	11	23	34	73	−39	35	
21	Corinthian	42	6	10	26	44	93	−49	28	
22	Sheppey United	42	6	7	29	35	83	−48	25	Relegated to the Kent League

Source: fchd.com rsssf.com
Rules for classification: 1) points; 2) goal difference; 3) number of goals scored.

== See also ==
- Southern Football League
- 1989–90 Isthmian League
- 1989–90 Northern Premier League
