= 1990–91 Southern Football League =

The 1990–91 Southern Football League season was the 88th in the history of the league, an English football competition.

Farnborough Town won the Premier Division and earned promotion to the Football Conference, having been relegated from the Conference the year before. Weymouth, who finished bottom of the Premier Division, were relegated to the Southern Division, whilst Rushden Town, despite finishing fourteenth, were relegated to the Midland Division as their ground did not meet the Premier Division criteria. The champions of the Midland and Southern divisions both failed to win promotion, meaning that only the second-placed clubs, Corby Town and Trowbridge Town were promoted.

== Premier Division ==
The Premier Division consisted of 22 clubs, including 17 clubs from the previous season and five new clubs:

- Two clubs promoted from the Midland Division:
  - Halesowen Town
  - Rushden Town
- Two clubs promoted from the Southern Division:
  - Bashley
  - Poole Town
- Plus:
  - Farnborough Town, relegated from the Football Conference

=== League table ===
Southern Football League Premier Division
- Season: 1990–91
- Champions: Farnborough Town
- Promoted: Farnborough Town
- Relegated: Weymouth
- Matches: 462
- Goals: 1,304 (2.82 per match)

Pos	Team	Pld	W	D	L	GF	GA	GD	Pts	Promotion or relegation
1	Farnborough Town	42	26	7	9	79	43	+36	85	Promoted to the Football Conference
2	Gloucester City	42	23	14	5	86	49	+37	83	
3	Cambridge City	42	21	14	7	63	43	+20	77	
4	Dover Athletic	42	21	11	10	56	37	+19	74	
5	Bromsgrove Rovers	42	20	11	11	68	49	+19	71	
6	Worcester City	42	18	12	12	55	42	+13	66	
7	Burton Albion	42	15	15	12	59	48	+11	60	
8	Halesowen Town	42	17	9	16	73	67	+6	60	
9	VS Rugby	42	16	11	15	56	46	+10	59	
10	Bashley	42	15	12	15	56	52	+4	57	
11	Dorchester Town	42	15	12	15	47	54	−7	57	
12	Wealdstone	42	16	8	18	57	58	−1	56	
13	Dartford	42	15	9	18	61	64	−3	54	
14	Rushden Town	42	14	11	17	64	66	−2	53	Demoted to the Midland Division
15	Atherstone United	42	14	10	18	55	58	−3	52	
16	Moor Green	42	15	6	21	64	75	−11	51	
17	Poole Town	42	12	13	17	56	69	−13	49	
18	Chelmsford City	42	11	15	16	57	68	−11	48	
19	Crawley Town	42	12	12	18	45	67	−22	48	
20	Waterlooville	42	11	13	18	51	70	−19	46	
21	Gravesend & Northfleet	42	9	7	26	46	91	−45	34	
22	Weymouth	42	4	12	26	50	88	−38	24	Relegated to the Southern Division

Source: fchd.com rsssf.com
Rules for classification: 1) points; 2) goal difference; 3) number of goals scored.

== Midland Division ==
The Midland Division consisted of 22 clubs, including 18 clubs from the previous season and four new clubs:

- Two clubs relegated from the Premier Division:
  - Alvechurch
  - Corby Town
- Plus:
  - Hinckley Town, promoted from the West Midlands (Regional) League
  - Newport, promoted from the Hellenic League

=== League table ===
Southern Football League Midland Division
- Season: 1990–91
- Champions: Stourbridge
- Promoted: Corby Town
- Relegated: Spalding United; Willenhall Town
- Matches: 462
- Goals: 1,395 (3.02 per match)

Pos	Team	Pld	W	D	L	GF	GA	GD	Pts	Promotion or relegation
1	Stourbridge	42	28	6	8	80	48	+32	90	
2	Corby Town	42	27	4	11	99	48	+51	85	Promoted to the Premier Division
3	Hednesford Town	42	25	7	10	79	47	+32	82	
4	Tamworth	42	25	5	12	84	45	+39	80	
5	Nuneaton Borough	42	21	11	10	74	51	+23	70 (Note: Nuneaton Borough were deducted four points.)	
6	Barry Town	42	20	7	15	61	48	+13	67	
7	Newport	42	19	6	17	54	46	+8	63	
8	King's Lynn	42	17	9	16	53	62	−9	60	
9	Grantham Town	42	17	7	18	62	56	+6	58	
10	Redditch United	42	16	10	16	66	75	−9	58	
11	Hinckley Town	42	16	9	17	72	68	+4	57	
12	Sutton Coldfield Town	42	15	11	16	56	65	−9	56	
13	Bedworth United	42	15	9	18	57	73	−16	54	
14	Bilston Town	42	14	9	19	69	79	−10	51	
15	Leicester United	42	14	10	18	65	77	−12	51 (Note: Leicester United were deducted one point.)	
16	Racing Club Warwick	42	12	13	17	56	65	−9	49	
17	Bridgnorth Town	42	13	9	20	62	74	−12	48	
18	Stroud	42	11	14	17	51	64	−13	47	
19	Dudley Town	42	11	13	18	48	73	−25	46	
20	Alvechurch	42	10	8	24	54	92	−38	38	
21	Willenhall Town	42	10	10	22	58	69	−11	37 (Note: Willenhall Town were deducted three points.)	Relegated to the West Midlands (Regional) League
22	Spalding United	42	8	9	25	35	70	−35	33	Relegated to the United Counties League

Source: fchd.com rsssf.com
Rules for classification: 1) points; 2) goal difference; 3) number of goals scored.

== Southern Division ==
The Southern Division consisted of 22 clubs, including 17 clubs from the previous season and five new clubs:

- Two clubs relegated from the Premier Division:
  - Ashford Town (Kent)
  - Gosport Borough
- Plus:
  - Folkestone Town, elected to replace the defunct Folkestone
  - Newport (Isle of Wight), promoted from the Wessex League
  - Sudbury Town, promoted from the Eastern Counties League

=== League table ===
Southern Football League Southern Division
- Season: 1990–91
- Champions: Buckingham Town
- Promoted: Trowbridge Town
- Relegated: Corinthian
- Matches: 420
- Goals: 1,238 (2.95 per match)

Pos	Team	Pld	W	D	L	GF	GA	GD	Pts	Promotion or relegation
1	Buckingham Town	40	25	8	7	73	38	+35	83	
2	Trowbridge Town	40	22	12	6	67	31	+36	78	Promoted to the Premier Division
3	Salisbury	40	22	11	7	63	39	+24	77	
4	Baldock Town	40	21	9	10	66	52	+14	72	
5	Ashford Town (Kent)	40	22	5	13	82	52	+30	71	
6	Yate Town	40	21	8	11	76	48	+28	71	Transferred to the Midland Division
7	Hastings Town	40	18	11	11	66	46	+20	65	
8	Hythe Town	40	17	9	14	55	44	+11	59 (Note: Hythe Town were deducted one point.)	
9	Andover	40	16	6	18	69	76	−7	54	
10	Margate	40	14	11	15	52	55	−3	53	
11	Burnham	40	12	16	12	57	49	+8	52	
12	Bury Town	40	15	5	20	58	74	−16	50	
13	Sudbury Town	40	13	10	17	60	68	−8	49	
14	Newport (Isle of Wight)	40	13	9	18	56	62	−6	48	
15	Gosport Borough	40	12	11	17	47	58	−11	47	
16	Witney Town	40	12	11	17	57	75	−18	47	
17	Dunstable	40	9	15	16	48	63	−15	42	
18	Canterbury City	40	12	6	22	60	83	−23	42	
19	Erith & Belvedere	40	10	6	24	46	73	−27	36	
20	Fareham Town	40	9	9	22	46	74	−28	36	
21	Corinthian	40	5	12	23	34	78	−44	27	Relegated to the Kent League
22	Folkestone Town	0	0	0	0	0	0	0	0	Folded mid-season, record expunged

Source: fchd.com rsssf.com
Rules for classification: 1) points; 2) goal difference; 3) number of goals scored.

== See also ==
- Southern Football League
- 1990–91 Isthmian League
- 1990–91 Northern Premier League
