= Great Western Combination =

- Founded: 1939
- Folded: 1964
- Country: England
- Most championships: Ernest Turner's Sports (3)

The Great Western Combination was a football league in south-central England.

== History ==
The league was established in 1939, initially as a wartime competition as many other leagues had been abandoned following the outbreak of World War II. Its original membership was amateur clubs from the area west of London. Although it ceased in 1945, it was re-established in 1946 and a second division was added in 1947; this became the reserve division in 1956. The league folded at the end of the 1963–64 season.

== Champions ==
Season	Champions	
1939–40	Hayes	
1940–41	Oxford City	
1941–42	Oxford City	
1942–43	Grenadier Guards	
1943–44	Windsor Works	
1944–45	Wycombe Wanderers	
1946–47	Binfield	
Season	Division One champions	Division Two champions
1947–48	Uxbridge	Harefield United
1948–49	Maidenhead United Reserves	RAF Halton
1949–50	Slough Centre	Hemel Hempstead Rovers
1950–51	Harefield United	Flackwell Heath
1951–52	Tring Town	Wingate
1952–53	Tring Town	Bell Punch
1953–54	Wokingham Town	Hestairco
Season	Premier Division champions	Division One champions
1954–55	Jackson's Sports	Chalvey
1955–56	Ernest Turner's Sports	Loudwater United
Season	Premier Division champions	Reserve Division champions
1956–57	Vickers Sports	
1957–58	Flackwell Heath	
1958–59	Southall Corinthians	
1959–60	Southall Corinthians	
1960–61	Ernest Turner's Sports	
1961–62	AEC	
1962–63	Flackwell Heath	
1963–64	Ernest Turner's Sports	

== Member clubs ==
Member clubs during the league's existence included:

- AEC (1958–1964)
- Amersham Town (1949–1956)
- Aylesbury Town Corinthians (1958–1964)
- Aylesbury United Reserves (1946–1951)
- BEA (London) (1954–1964)
- BEA (Northholt) (1949–1954)
- Bell Punch (1948–1959)
- Berkhamsted Town (1946–1951)
- Binfield (1946–1951)
- Blue Circle (1955–1956)
- Bracknell Town (1958–1962)
- British Oxygen (1954–1955)
- Broomwade (1955–1960)
- Bucks NALGO (1950–1951)
- Burnham (1947–1964)
- Cavendish (1955–1960)
- Chalfont St Peter (1948–1958)
- Chalvey (1954–1959)
- Chelsea Mariners (1955–1956)
- Chesham United (1939–1945)
- Chesham United Reserves (1946–1948)
- Croxley Wanderers (1951–1953)
- Eastcote (1951–1953)
- Ernest Turner's Sports (1951–1964)
- Flackwell Heath (1950–1964)
- Ford Sports (1951–1952)
- Gerrard's Cross (1954–1956)
- Grenadier Guards (1941–1943)
- Hanwell Association (1954–1958)
- Harefield United (1947–1964)
- Harrow Town (1948–1950)
- Harrow Town Reserves (1947–1951)
- Hayes (1939–1940)
- Hazells (1949–1955)
- Hemel Hempstead Rovers (1947–1955)
- Hemel Hempstead Town (1949–1950)
- Henley Town (1939–1940, 1952–1955)
- Henley Town Reserves (1951–1952)
- Hestairco Sports (1952–1955)
- High Duty Alloys (1940–1947)
- Huntley & Palmers (1948–1949)
- Huntley & Palmer Reserves (1947–1948)
- Jackson' Sports (1949–1957)
- Kodak (1959–1964)
- Loudwater United (1955–1962)
- Lyons Club (1948–1950)
- Lyons Club Reserves (1947–1948)
- Maidenhead North Town (1954–1956)
- Maidenhead United (1939–1945)
- Maidenhead United Reserves (1946–1949)
- Marlow (1939–1945)
- Marlow Reserves (1947–1955)
- Mill End Sports (1949–1951)
- Oxford City (1940–1945)
- Pinner (1946–1951)
- Princes Risborough (1953–1954)
- Queensborough (1958–1964)
- RAF Halton (1948–1952)
- RAF High Wycombe (1943–1945)
- Reading Aerodrome (1953–1957)
- Reading Reserves (1940–1945)
- Rickmansworth Town Reserves (1954–1956)
- Rootes Athletic (1954–1955)
- Royal Ascot (1955–1958)
- Ruislip Gardens (1952–1955)
- Ruislip (1946–1949)
- Ruislip Manor Reserves (1947–1949)
- Ruislip Town (1949–1952, 1954–1956, 1961–1964)
- Seer Green (1958–1964)
- Slough (1939–1940)
- Slough Centre (1942–1950)
- Slough Centre Reserves (1947–1951)
- Slough United (1943–1945)
- Southall Corinthians (1951–1964)
- Staines Town Reserves (1953–1956)
- Stokenchurch Reserves (1954–1955)
- Terriers Athletic (1963–1964)
- Tring Town (1948–1954)
- Twickenham Town (1953–1954)
- Uxbridge Reserves (1946–1948)
- Uxbridge (1939–1945)
- Vickers Sports (1952–1957)
- Vickers Sports Reserves (1955–1956)
- Wendover (1948–1950)
- Willesden Reserves (1949–1951)
- Windsor & Eton (1939–1945)
- Windsor & Eton Reserves (1946–1945)
- Windsor Works (1942–1948)
- Wingate Reserves (1951–1952)
- Wokingham Town (1951–1956)
- Wycombe Redfords (1939–1948)
- Wycombe Wanderers 'A' (1948–1949)
- Wycombe Wanderers Reserves (1947–1948)
- Wycombe Wanderers (1939–1945)
- Yiewsley (1944–1951)
