= Ruislip F.C. =

Coordinates: 51.587011°N 0.44276699°W

- Full name: Ruislip Football Club
- Founded: 1936
- Dissolved: 1990
- Ground: New Pond Farm, Ruislip; Breakspear Road, Ruislip

Ruislip Football Club was a semi-professional football club based in Ruislip, West London. They played in the Southern League during the 1980s.

== History ==
Ruislip F.C. was formed on 16 June 1936 after a vote to create the new football club was carried following an open meeting at the Ruislip Boy's Club. Mr E. Smith of the Boys Club was elected as its first chairman. The club was established from a successful Ruislip Boy's Club side which had been champions of the Harrow and District League Division IV in the 1934–35 season and Division III champions in the 1935–36 season.

Ruislip F.C.'s first game was a friendly against Pinner Reserves at Pinner on 29 August 1936. The club's home ground was the Number 1 pitch at the New Pond Farm Playing Field in Ruislip situated approximately 400 yards north of Ruislip Gardens London Underground station.

In the 1936–37 season Ruislip F.C. finished runners-up in the Harrow and District League Division One gaining promotion to the Premier Division. The club were champions of the Premier Division in the 1937–38 season. Ruislip were intending to play in both the Premier Division of the Harrow League and the Middlesex County League for the 1939–40 season. However, with the coming of the war in September 1939 the club did not compete again until 1946.

After the war the club joined the Great Western Combination League for the start of the 1946–47 season. They opened the season at their new ground at Breakspear Road against Chesham United on 14 September 1946, winning 4–1.

In May 1949 the Middlesex F.A. granted permission for Ruislip Football Club to change their name to Ruislip Town. In June 1949 the club were re-elected to Division One of the Great Western Combination for the 1949–50 season after finishing bottom of the league in the previous season. They remained in the league until the 1951–52 season. From 1952 to 1954, the club competed in the Parthenon League. They returned to the Great Western Combination for the 1954–55 and 1955–56 seasons. In 1956 Ruislip Town joined the Hellenic League, becoming founder members of the newly formed Division One. In 1961 Ruislip Town left the Hellenic League and again rejoined the Great Western Combination League for the league's remaining three seasons.

In the 1966–67 season Ruislip Town joined the inaugural Middlesex League Premier Division and played in the league until the end of the 1976–77 season. They rejoined the Hellenic League for the 1977–78 season. At the end of the 1979–80 the club once against left the Hellenic League and rejoined the Middlesex League. However, the 1980–81 season saw the club lose all but one of their twenty-six league games and they left the league.

In October 1981 the club merged with junior club Coteford F.C. with Coteford completing their 1981–82 season in the West Middlesex Combination League. The club was renamed back to Ruislip Football Club, after which they returned to the Middlesex League Premier Division for the 1982–83 season. They finished second-from-bottom of the Premier Division in their first season and ended the 1983–84 season in last place. The league then became the Middlesex County League. Despite only finishing eleventh in the league's inaugural season, Ruislip moved up to the Southern Division of the Southern League. In the 1985–6 season Ruislip achieved their highest league position finishing eighth. However, they finished bottom of the Southern Division in the 1988–89 season and left the league.

Merger talks began with Bromley Park Rangers, a founder member of the Chiltonian League who were based in Hillingdon in May 1989. The two clubs were amalgamated in June 1989 to form Ruislip Park. The new club joined the Premier Division of the Hellenic League for the 1989–90 season. The club was disbanded at the end of the season. The club's ground was taken over by a refounded Hillingdon Borough, which joined the Premier Division of the Spartan League for the 1990–91 season.

== Ground ==
The club played at New Pond Farm playing fields from 1936 to 1939 and at Breakspear Road from 1946, which was renamed the Middlesex Stadium in 1990.

== Honours ==
- Harrow and District League
  - Premier Division champions 1937–38

== Records ==
- Best FA Cup performance: First qualifying round, 1988–89
- Best FA Vase performance: First round, 1988–89

== See also ==
- Ruislip F.C. players
