= 1991–92 Southern Football League =

The 1991–92 Southern Football League season was the 89th in the history of the league, an English football competition.

Bromsgrove Rovers won the Premier Division to earned promotion to the Football Conference. Wealdstone, Poole Town, Fisher Athletic (who had just been relegated from the Conference) and Gravesend & Northfleet were all relegated from the Premier Division, whilst Solihull Borough (in their first season in the Southern League), Hastings Town, Hednesford Town and Weymouth were all promoted to the Premier Division, the former two as champions. Only two clubs, Alvechurch and Gosport Borough, were relegated from the Southern League, whilst Hythe Town folded and Rushden Town merged with United Counties League club Irthlingborough Diamonds to form Rushden & Diamonds.

== Premier Division ==
The Premier Division consisted of 22 clubs, including 19 clubs from the previous season and three new clubs:

- Corby Town, promoted from the Midland Division
- Fisher Athletic, relegated from the Football Conference
- Trowbridge Town, promoted from the Southern Division

=== League table ===
Southern Football League Premier Division
- Season: 1991–92
- Champions: Bromsgrove Rovers
- Promoted: Bromsgrove Rovers
- Relegated: Fisher Athletic; Gravesend & Northfleet; Poole Town; Wealdstone
- Matches: 462
- Goals: 1,320 (2.86 per match)

Pos	Team	Pld	W	D	L	GF	GA	GD	Pts	Promotion or relegation
1	Bromsgrove Rovers	42	27	9	6	78	34	+44	90	Promoted to the Football Conference
2	Dover Athletic	42	23	15	4	66	30	+36	84	
3	VS Rugby	42	23	11	8	70	44	+26	80	
4	Bashley	42	22	8	12	70	44	+26	74	
5	Cambridge City	42	18	14	10	71	53	+18	68	
6	Dartford	42	17	15	10	62	45	+17	66	
7	Trowbridge Town	42	17	10	15	69	51	+18	61	
8	Halesowen Town	42	15	15	12	61	49	+12	60	
9	Moor Green	42	15	11	16	61	59	+2	56	
10	Burton Albion	42	15	10	17	59	61	−2	55	
11	Dorchester Town	42	14	13	15	66	73	−7	55	
12	Gloucester City	42	15	9	18	67	70	−3	54	
13	Atherstone United	42	15	8	19	54	66	−12	53	
14	Corby Town	42	13	12	17	66	81	−15	51	
15	Waterlooville	42	13	11	18	43	56	−13	50	
16	Worcester City	42	12	13	17	56	59	−3	49	
17	Crawley Town	42	12	12	18	62	67	−5	48	
18	Chelmsford City	42	12	12	18	49	56	−7	48	
19	Wealdstone	42	13	7	22	52	69	−17	46	Relegated to the Southern Division
20	Poole Town	42	10	13	19	46	77	−31	43	Relegated to the Southern Division
21	Fisher Athletic	42	9	11	22	53	89	−36	38	Relegated to the Southern Division
22	Gravesend & Northfleet	42	8	9	25	39	87	−48	33	Relegated to the Southern Division

Source: fchd.com rsssf.com
Rules for classification: 1) points; 2) goal difference; 3) number of goals scored.

== Midland Division ==
The Midland Division consisted of 22 clubs, including 19 clubs from the previous season and three new clubs:

- Rushden Town, relegated from the Premier Division
- Solihull Borough, promoted from the Midland Combination
- Yate Town, transferred from the Southern Division

At the end of the season Stroud reverted name to Forest Green Rovers, while Rushden Town merged into new club Irthlingborough Diamonds, who took over place in the Midland Division.

=== League table ===
Southern Football League Midland Division
- Season: 1991–92
- Champions: Solihull Borough
- Promoted: Hednesford Town; Solihull Borough
- Relegated: Alvechurch
- Matches: 462
- Goals: 1,436 (3.11 per match)

Pos	Team	Pld	W	D	L	GF	GA	GD	Pts	Promotion or relegation
1	Solihull Borough	42	29	10	3	92	40	+52	97	Promoted to the Premier Division
2	Hednesford Town	42	26	13	3	81	37	+44	91	Promoted to the Premier Division
3	Sutton Coldfield Town	42	21	11	10	71	51	+20	74	
4	Barry Town	42	21	6	15	88	56	+32	69	
5	Bedworth United	42	16	15	11	67	63	+4	63	
6	Nuneaton Borough	42	17	11	14	68	53	+15	62	
7	Tamworth	42	16	12	14	66	52	+14	60	
8	Rushden Town	42	16	12	14	69	63	+6	60	Merged into Rushden & Diamonds
9	Stourbridge	42	17	8	17	85	62	+23	59	
10	Newport	42	15	13	14	72	60	+12	58	
11	Yate Town	42	14	15	13	65	64	+1	57	
12	Bilston Town	42	15	10	17	56	67	−11	55	
13	Grantham Town	42	11	17	14	59	55	+4	50	
14	King's Lynn	42	13	11	18	61	68	−7	50	
15	Hinckley Town	42	14	8	20	61	87	−26	50	
16	Leicester United	42	12	13	17	56	63	−7	49	
17	Bridgnorth Town	42	12	12	18	61	74	−13	48	
18	Racing Club Warwick	42	11	14	17	45	61	−16	47	
19	Stroud	42	14	4	24	66	88	−22	46	
20	Redditch United	42	12	8	22	52	92	−40	44	
21	Alvechurch	42	11	10	21	54	88	−34	43	Relegated to the West Midlands (Regional) League
22	Dudley Town	42	8	9	25	41	92	−51	33	

Source: fchd.com rsssf.com
Rules for classification: 1) points; 2) goal difference; 3) number of goals scored.

== Southern Division ==
The Southern Division consisted of 22 clubs, including 18 clubs from the previous season and four new clubs:

- Braintree Town, promoted from the Eastern Counties League
- Havant Town, promoted from the Wessex League
- Sittingbourne, promoted from the Kent League
- Weymouth, relegated from the Premier Division

=== League table ===
Southern Football League Southern Division
- Season: 1991–92
- Champions: Hastings Town
- Promoted: Hastings Town; Weymouth
- Relegated: Gosport Borough
- Matches: 462
- Goals: 1,297 (2.81 per match)

Pos	Team	Pld	W	D	L	GF	GA	GD	Pts	Promotion or relegation
1	Hastings Town	42	28	7	7	80	37	+43	91	Promoted to the Premier Division
2	Weymouth	42	22	12	8	64	35	+29	78	Promoted to the Premier Division
3	Havant Town	42	21	12	9	67	46	+21	75	
4	Braintree Town	42	21	8	13	77	58	+19	71	
5	Buckingham Town	42	19	15	8	57	26	+31	69 (Note: Buckingham Town were deducted three points.)	
6	Andover	42	18	10	14	73	68	+5	64	
7	Ashford Town (Kent)	42	17	12	13	66	57	+9	63	
8	Sudbury Town	42	18	9	15	70	66	+4	63	
9	Sittingbourne	42	19	10	13	63	41	+22	61 (Note: Sittingbourne were deducted six points.)	
10	Burnham	42	15	14	13	57	55	+2	59	
11	Baldock Town	42	16	10	16	62	67	−5	58	
12	Salisbury	42	13	16	13	67	51	+16	55	
13	Hythe Town	42	15	10	17	61	62	−1	55	Club folded
14	Margate	42	13	16	13	49	56	−7	55	
15	Newport (Isle of Wight)	42	13	10	19	58	63	−5	49	
16	Dunstable	42	12	12	18	55	67	−12	48	
17	Bury Town	42	14	4	24	52	94	−42	46	
18	Witney Town	42	11	12	19	55	76	−21	45	
19	Fareham Town	42	12	8	22	45	71	−26	44	
20	Erith & Belvedere	42	11	10	21	44	67	−23	43	
21	Canterbury City	42	8	14	20	43	69	−26	38	
22	Gosport Borough	42	6	9	27	32	65	−33	27	Relegated to the Wessex League

Source: fchd.com rsssf.com
Rules for classification: 1) points; 2) goal difference; 3) number of goals scored.

== See also ==
- Southern Football League
- 1991–92 Isthmian League
- 1991–92 Northern Premier League
