= 1988–89 Southern Football League =

The 1988–89 Southern Football League season was the 86th in the history of the league, an English football competition.

Merthyr Tydfil won the Premier Division and earned promotion to the Football Conference, whilst Coventry Sporting, Wellingborough Town, Mile Oak Rovers, Tonbridge and Ruislip left the league at the end of the season.

== Premier Division ==
The Premier Division consisted of 22 clubs, including 16 clubs from the previous season and six new clubs:

- Two clubs promoted from the Midland Division:
  - Merthyr Tydfil
  - Moor Green
- Two clubs promoted from the Southern Division:
  - Dover Athletic
  - Waterlooville
- Two clubs relegated from the Football Conference:
  - Bath City
  - Wealdstone

=== League table ===
Southern Football League Premier Division
- Season: 1988–89
- Champions: Merthyr Tydfil
- Promoted: Merthyr Tydfil
- Relegated: Fareham Town; Leicester United; Redditch United; Bedworth Town
- Matches: 462
- Goals: 1,369 (2.96 per match)

Pos	Team	Pld	W	D	L	GF	GA	GD	Pts	Promotion or relegation
1	Merthyr Tydfil	42	26	7	9	104	58	+46	85	Promoted to the Football Conference
2	Dartford	42	25	7	10	79	33	+46	82	
3	VS Rugby	42	24	7	11	64	43	+21	79	
4	Worcester City	42	20	13	9	72	49	+23	73	
5	Cambridge City	42	20	10	12	72	51	+21	70	
6	Dover Athletic	42	19	12	11	65	47	+18	69	
7	Gosport Borough	42	18	12	12	73	57	+16	66	
8	Burton Albion	42	18	10	14	79	68	+11	64	
9	Bath City	42	15	13	14	66	51	+15	58	
10	Bromsgrove Rovers	42	14	16	12	68	56	+12	58	
11	Wealdstone	42	16	10	16	60	53	+7	58	
12	Crawley Town	42	14	16	12	64	56	+8	58	
13	Dorchester Town	42	14	16	12	56	61	−5	58	
14	Alvechurch	42	16	8	18	56	59	−3	56	
15	Moor Green	42	14	13	15	58	70	−12	55	
16	Corby Town	42	14	11	17	55	59	−4	53	
17	Waterlooville	42	13	13	16	61	63	−2	52	
18	Ashford Town (Kent)	42	13	13	16	59	76	−17	52	
19	Fareham Town	42	15	6	21	43	68	−25	51	Relegated to the Southern Division
20	Leicester United	42	6	11	25	46	87	−41	29	Relegated to the Midland Division
21	Redditch United	42	5	7	30	36	105	−69	22	Relegated to the Midland Division
22	Bedworth United	42	4	7	31	36	102	−66	19	Relegated to the Midland Division

Source: fchd.com rsssf.com
Rules for classification: 1) points; 2) goal difference; 3) number of goals scored.

== Midland Division ==
The Midland Division consisted of 22 clubs, including 17 clubs from the previous season and five new clubs:

- Two clubs relegated from the Premier Division:
  - Nuneaton Borough
  - Willenhall Town
- Plus:
  - Ashtree Highfield, promoted from the Midland Combination
  - Spalding United, promoted from the United Counties League
  - Tamworth, promoted from the West Midlands League

Also, at the end of the season Forest Green Rovers was renamed Stroud and Ashfield Hightree was renamed Sandwell Borough.

=== League table ===
Southern Football League Midland Division
- Season: 1988–89
- Champions: Gloucester City
- Promoted: Atherstone United; Gloucester City
- Relegated: Mile Oak Rovers; Wellingborough Town
- Matches: 462
- Goals: 1,361 (2.95 per match)

Pos	Team	Pld	W	D	L	GF	GA	GD	Pts	Promotion or relegation
1	Gloucester City	42	28	8	6	95	37	+58	92	Promoted to the Premier Division
2	Atherstone United	42	26	9	7	85	38	+47	87	Promoted to the Premier Division
3	Tamworth	42	26	9	7	85	45	+40	87	
4	Halesowen Town	42	25	10	7	85	42	+43	85	
5	Grantham Town	42	23	11	8	66	37	+29	80	
6	Nuneaton Borough	42	19	9	14	71	58	+13	66	
7	Rushden Town	42	19	8	15	71	50	+21	65	
8	Spalding United	42	17	13	12	72	64	+8	64	
9	Dudley Town	42	16	13	13	73	62	+11	61	
10	Sutton Coldfield Town	42	18	7	17	56	56	0	61	
11	Willenhall Town	42	16	12	14	65	71	−6	60	
12	Forest Green Rovers	42	12	16	14	64	67	−3	52	
13	Bilston Town	42	15	7	20	63	71	−8	52	
14	Ashtree Highfield	42	12	15	15	57	62	−5	51	
15	Hednesford Town	42	12	15	15	49	57	−8	51	
16	Banbury United	42	10	14	18	53	74	−21	44	
17	Bridgnorth Town	42	12	7	23	59	77	−18	43	
18	Stourbridge	42	11	10	21	37	65	−28	43	
19	King's Lynn	42	7	13	22	31	67	−36	34	
20	Coventry Sporting	42	6	13	23	39	91	−52	31	Club folded
21	Wellingborough Town	42	5	15	22	39	72	−33	30	Relegated to the United Counties League
22	Mile Oak Rovers	42	5	10	27	46	98	−52	25	Relegated to the Midland Combination

Source: fchd.com rsssf.com
Rules for classification: 1) points; 2) goal difference; 3) number of goals scored.

== Southern Division ==
The Southern Division consisted of 22 clubs, including 18 clubs from the previous season and four new clubs:

- Two clubs relegated from the Premier Division:
  - Chelmsford City
  - Witney Town
- Two clubs transferred from the Midland Division:
  - Buckingham Town
  - Trowbridge Town

At the end of the season Thanet United reverted name to Margate.

=== League table ===
Southern Football League Southern Division
- Season: 1988–89
- Champions: Chelmsford City
- Promoted: Chelmsford City; Gravesend & Northfleet
- Relegated: Tonbridge
- Matches: 462
- Goals: 1,414 (3.06 per match)

Pos	Team	Pld	W	D	L	GF	GA	GD	Pts	Promotion or relegation
1	Chelmsford City	42	30	5	7	106	38	+68	95	Promoted to the Premier Division
2	Gravesend & Northfleet	42	27	6	9	70	40	+30	87	Promoted to the Premier Division
3	Poole Town	42	24	11	7	98	48	+50	83	
4	Bury Town	42	25	7	10	75	34	+41	82	
5	Burnham	42	22	13	7	78	47	+31	79	
6	Baldock Town	42	23	5	14	69	40	+29	74	
7	Hastings Town	42	21	11	10	75	48	+27	74	
8	Hounslow	42	21	6	15	75	60	+15	69	
9	Salisbury	42	20	5	17	79	58	+21	65	
10	Trowbridge Town	42	19	7	16	59	52	+7	64	
11	Folkestone	42	17	8	17	62	65	−3	59	
12	Corinthian	42	13	13	16	59	69	−10	52	
13	Canterbury City	42	14	8	20	52	60	−8	50	
14	Witney Town	42	13	11	18	61	71	−10	50	
15	Dunstable	42	11	14	17	42	57	−15	47	
16	Buckingham Town	42	12	10	20	56	79	−23	46	
17	Erith & Belvedere	42	11	10	21	48	63	−15	43	
18	Andover	42	11	9	22	56	90	−34	42	
19	Sheppey United	42	10	8	24	50	90	−40	38	
20	Thanet United	42	7	15	20	47	95	−48	36	
21	Tonbridge	42	7	6	29	50	98	−48	27	Relegated to the Kent Football League
22	Ruislip	42	6	8	28	47	112	−65	26	Club folded

Source: fchd.com rsssf.com
Rules for classification: 1) points; 2) goal difference; 3) number of goals scored.

== See also ==
- Southern Football League
- 1988–89 Isthmian League
- 1988–89 Northern Premier League
