= Steve Abbley =

English footballer

Personal information
- Full name: Stephen George Abbley
- Date of birth: 19 March 1957 (age 69)
- Place of birth: Liverpool, Lancashire, England
- Position: Right wing

Team information
- Current team: Circencester Town (Chairman)

Senior career*
Years	Team	Apps	(Gls)
–1979	Parks	–	(–)
1979–1982	Swindon Town	23	(0)
- Cheltenham Town
1988-1990	Wycombe Wanderers	63	(1)
- Tonbridge
- Gloucester City
- Trowbridge Town
- Cirencester Town
- * Club domestic league appearances and goals as of 19:23, 22 July 2009 (UTC)

Steve Abbley (born 19 March 1957 in Liverpool) is a former footballer who spent the majority of his career in Non-League football. Abbley was a professional with Swindon Town. Currently, he is chairman of Cirencester Town.

Stephen George Abbley started his career with Non-League club Parks F.C. before joining Swindon Town as a 22-year-old in October 1979.

Abbley operated on the right side of Swindon's defence, but could also play on the left. However, Abbley struggled to break into the Swindon first team throughout his career in Wiltshire.

The Liverpudlian appeared in only five league fixtures during his first season at the club. His Town debut came as a late in the 2–0 loss at Blackburn Rovers in March 1980. His first win occurred in the 3–0 home win against Gillingham, Abbley was booked in a heated game which also saw future Manchester United captain Steve Bruce sent-off for two bookable offences.

During Abbley's second season at Swindon he could only muster three appearances in the first team.

Steve Abbley's third and final season in professional football was his best for first team appearances, making 15 outings including the 5–0 loss at rivals Oxford United and made his final league appearance in the 2–0 defeat at Fulham. However, despite making more outings for the first team Swindon were relegated into the Fourth Division.

After his release from Swindon, Abbley dropped into Non-League football playing for future league teams Cheltenham Town and Wycombe Wanderers.

Since retiring, Abbley has become chairman of Southern Football League club Cirencester Town, helping them move into their Corinium Stadium in 2002.
