= Gloucestershire Northern Senior League =

Association football league in England

- Founded: 1922
- Country: England
- Divisions: 2
- Number of clubs: 32
- Feeder to: Gloucestershire County League
- Promotion to: Gloucestershire County League
- Relegation to: Cheltenham Association League Division One; North Gloucestershire League Premier Division; Stroud and District League Division One
- League cup: Reg Davis Memorial Cup
- Current champions: Longlevens Reserves (2025-26)
- Website: Official Website

The Gloucestershire Northern Senior League is a football competition based in England founded in 1922. The league is affiliated to the Gloucestershire County FA. It has two divisions, Division One and Division Two. This league is a feeder to the Gloucestershire County League. The Cheltenham League, Stroud and District League and North Gloucestershire League are feeders to the GNSL.

== History ==
The league was formed in 1922 and the founder members included Cheltenham Town, Gloucester City and Forest Green Rovers.

A number of clubs in the NSL have played in the Gloucestershire County League or higher but have dropped back into lower tier football. Notable clubs include:

- Harrow Hill joined the County League in 1982/83 and gained promotion to the Hellenic Football League.
- Stonehouse Town were original members of the County League and competed in the competition for 20 years until 1988. From 1947 until 1960 the club played in the Western Football League.

Among the clubs that have left the Gloucestershire Northern Senior League and now compete at a higher level are:

- Bishop's Cleeve
- Brimscombe & Thrupp
- Cheltenham Town
- Cinderford Town
- Cirencester Town
- Forest Green Rovers
- Gloucester City
- Longlevens
- Lydney Town
- Newent Town
- Shortwood United
- Slimbridge
- Tuffley Rovers

== Champions ==
| Season | Division One | Division Two |
|---|---|---|
| 1956–57 | Lydbrook Athletic | Cirencester Town |
| 1957–58 | Lydbrook Athletic | Synwell Rovers |
| 1958–59 | Lydbrook Athletic | Bream |
| 1959–60 | Lydbrook Athletic | Hoffman Athletic |
| 1960–61 | Cinderford Town | Wotton Rovers |
| 1961–62 | Lydbrook Athletic | Cirencester Town |
| 1962–63 | Sharpness | Shortwood United |
| 1963–64 | Harrow Hill | Dursley Town |
| 1964–65 | Harrow Hill | Bream |
| 1965–66 | Sharpness | Cheltenham Town Reserves |
| 1966–67 | Cirencester Town | Matson Athletic |
| 1967–68 | Cirencester Town | Bishops Cleeve |
| 1968–69 | Bishops Cleeve | Charlton Kings |
| 1969–70 | Bishops Cleeve | Forest Green Rovers Reserves |
| 1970–71 | Viney St Swithins | Cope Chat |
| 1971–72 | Harrow Hill | Wilton Rovers |
| 1972–73 | Bishops Cleeve | Newent Town |
| 1973–74 | Viney St Swithins | Charlton Kings reserves |
| 1974–75 | St Marks C.A. | Matson Athletic |
| 1975–76 | Matson Athletic Reserves | Forest Green Rovers Reserves |
| 1976–77 | Forest Green Rovers Reserves | Bymacks |
| 1977–78 | Chalford | Hilldene Athletic |
| 1978–79 | St Marks C.A. | Wilton Rovers Reserves |
| 1979–80 | Lydney Town | Frampton United reserves |
| 1980–81 | St Marks C.A. | Shortwood United Reserves |
| 1981–82 | Harrow Hill | Brimscombe & Thrupp |
| 1982–83 | Wotton Rovers | Viney St. Swithins |
| 1983–84 | St Marks C.A. | Berkeley Town |
| 1984–85 | Brimscombe & Thrupp | ICI Fibres |
| 1985–86 | ICI Fibres | Smiths Athletic |
| 1986–87 | ICI Fibres | Worrall Hill |
| 1987–88 | Tuffley Rovers | Longlevens |

| Season | Division One | Division Two |
|---|---|---|
| 1988–89 | Berkeley Town | Cam Bulldogs |
| 1989–90 | St Marks C.A. | ICI Fibres |
| 1990–91 | Dowty Dynamos | Shortwood United Reserves |
| 1991–92 | Smiths Athletic | Endsleigh |
| 1992–93 | Endsleigh | Brockworth |
| 1993–94 | Broadwell Amateurs | Stonehouse Freeway |
| 1994–95 | Brockworth | Lydney Town |
| 1995–96 | Dursley Town | Tuffley Rovers Reserves |
| 1996–97 | Viney St Swithins | Whitminster |
| 1997–98 | Whitminster | Lydbrook Athletic |
| 1998–99 | Tuffley Rovers Reserves | Kingswood |
| 1999–2000 | Whitminster | Bourton Rovers |
| 2000–01 | Sharpness | Bredon |
| 2001–02 | Wotton Rovers | Longlevens |
| 2002–03 | Kings Stanley | Warden Hill United |
| 2003–04 | Warden Hill | Bourton Rovers |
| 2004–05 | Lydney Town | Brimscombe & Thrupp |
| 2005–06 | Berkeley Town | Tuffley Rovers |
| 2006–07 | Tuffley Rovers | Slimbridge Reserves |
| 2007–08 | Slimbridge | Gala Wilton |
| 2008–09 | Longlevens | Stonehouse Town |
| 2009–10 | Sharpness | Leonard Stanley |
| 2010–11 | Brockworth Albion | Frampton United |
| 2011–12 | Shortwood United Reserves | Cheltenham Civil Service |
| 2012–13 | Gala Wilton | Ruardean Hill Rangers |
| 2013–14 | Cam Bulldogs | FC Barometrics |
| 2014–15 | Broadwell Amateurs | Charlton Rovers |
| 2015–16 | Sharpness | Bibury |
| 2016–17 | Ruardean Hill Rangers | Chalford |
| 2017–18 | Charlton Rovers | Welland |
| 2018–19 | Sharpness | Woolaston |
| 2019-20 | N/A | N/A |
| 2020-21 | N/A | N/A |
| 2021-22 | Cheltenham Civil Service | Stonehouse Town Reserves |
| 2022-23 | Chalford | Tewkesbury Town |
| 2023-24 | Chalford | Whaddon United |
| 2024-25 | Tewkesbury Town | Falcons |
| 2025-26 | Longlevens Reserves | Hardwicke |

== Members 2026–27 ==
=== Division One ===
- Barnwood United
- Bredon
- Brockworth Albion
- Charfield
- Cheltenham Civil Service
- Dursley Town
- English Bicknor
- Falcons
- Gala Wilton
- Hardwicke
- Lydney Town Reserves
- Smiths Barometrics
- Stonehouse Town Reserves
- Whaddon United
- Wickwar Wanderers

=== Division Two ===
- Blakeney
- Bream Amateurs
- Fintan
- Frampton United Res
- Harrow Hill
- Huntley
- Kings Stanley
- Lydbrook Athletic
- Minchinhampton
- Mushet & Coalway United
- Old Richians
- Painswick
- Tewkesbury Town Reserves
- Tuffley Rovers Reserves
- Viney St Swithins
- Winchcombe Town

== League committee ==
| Position | Name |
|---|---|
| President | Colin Peake |
| President Elec | Nick Oram |
| Chair | Roger Sansom |
| Vice Chair | Sandra Major |
| General Secretary | John Green |
| Treasurer | David Purser |
| Assistant Secretary | Jeremy Lewis |
| Referees Secretary | Colin Ward |

=== Committee Members 2026 ===
- Mike Bollands
- Phil Comfort
- Paul Cowmeadow
- John Green
- Marc Lane
- Jeremy Lewis
- Sandra Major
- Nick Oram
- Colin Peake
- David Purser
- Tom Reason
- Roger Sansom
- Kelly Staddon
- Justin Tapfield
- Adrian Thomas
- Colin Ward

Club Delegate Allocations 2026-27
| Club | Delegate |
|---|---|
| Barnwood United | Mike Bollands |
| Blakeney | Justin Tapfield |
| Bream Amateurs | Paul Cowmeadow |
| Bredon | Mike Bollands |
| Brockworth Albion | Adrian Thomas |
| Charfield | Adrian Thomas |
| Cheltenham Civil Service | Mike Bollands |
| Dursley Town | Adrian Thomas |
| English Bicknor | Tom Reason |
| Falcons | Adrian Thomas |
| Fintan | Paul Cowmeadow |
| Frampton United; | Marc Lane |
| Gala Wilton | Kelly Staddon |
| Hardwicke | Tom Reason |
| Harrow Hill | Justin Tapfield |
| Huntley | Phil Comfort |
| Kings Stanley | Paul Cowmeadow |
| Lydbrook Athletic | Justin Tapfield |
| Lydney Town | Tom Reason |
| Minchinhampton | Marc Lane |
| Mushet & Coalway United | Paul Cowmeadow |
| Painswick | Phil Comfort |
| Old Richians | Phil Comfort |
| Smiths Barometrics | Tom Reason |
| Stonehouse Town | Mike Bollands |
| Tewkesbury Town | Marc Lane |
| Tuffley Rovers | Justin Tapfield |
| Viney St Swithins | Marc Lane |
| Whaddon United | Kelly Staddon |
| Wickwar Wanderers | Kelly Staddon |
| Winchcombe Town | Phil Comfort |

== League officers roll of honour ==
League President
| Year | President |
|---|---|
| 1922-1940 | Sir Stanley W Tubbs |
| 1946-1962 | W J Pepworth |
| 1962-1976 | W R Fream |
| 1976-1983 | A Fryer |
| 1983-1986 | A Ruck |
| 1986-1995 | H J Morgan |
| 1995-1998 | A D Bushell |
| 1998-2001 | R R Davis |
| 2001-2004 | E J George |
| 2004-2007 | F W Trueman |
| 2007-2010 | C Timbrell |
| 2010-2013 | R A Sanson |
| 2013-2016 | C Starkey |
| 2016-2017 | D R Purser |
| 2017-2023 | W J Phillips |
| 2023- | C Peake |

League Chair
| Year | Chair |
|---|---|
| 1922-1923 | W J Pepworth |
| 1923-1935 | F C Ford |
| 1935-1937 | S W Smith |
| 1937-1939 | H F Midwinter |
| 1946-1950 | W H Lewis |
| 1950-1952 | W R Fream |
| 1952-1965 | A J Hicks |
| 1965-1976 | E G Smith |
| 1976-1986 | H J Morgan |
| 1986-1997 | R R Davis |
| 1997-2017 | W J Phillips |
| 2017- | R A Sansom |

League Vice Chair
| Year | Vice Chair |
|---|---|
| 1922-1923 | F C Ford |
| 1923-1924 | D Rowles |
| 1924-1926 | EJ Vaisey |
| 1926-1927 | W H Lewis |
| 1927-1935 | S W Smith |
| 1935-1939 | W H Lewis |
| 1946-1950 | W R Fream |
| 1950-1952 | A J Hicks |
| 1952-1965 | E G Smith |
| 1965-1975 | J Ruck |
| 1975-1976 | H J Morgan |
| 1976-1986 | R R Davis |
| 1986-1997 | E J George |
| 1997-2016 | C Starkey |
| 2016-2017 | R A Sansom |
| 2017-2022 | N D Oram |
| 2022- | Mrs S Major |

League General Secretary
| Year | General Secretary |
|---|---|
| 1922-1924 | Lieutenant J Orgee DSC |
| 1924-1926 | F F J Goddard |
| 1926-1929 | W R Fream |
| 1946-1947 | F F J Goddard |
| 1947 | AW Manby |
| 1947-1949 | SM Evans |
| 1979 | W J Phillips |
| 1979-1991 | C J Peake |
| 1991-1997 | W N Pember |
| 1997- | J M Green |

League Treasurer
| Year | Treasurer |
|---|---|
| 1922-1923 | E F Davy |
| 1923-1924 | Lieutenant J Orgee DSC |
| 1924-1935 | S W Smith |
| 1935-1952 | A J Hicks |
| 1952-1970 | D N Perry |
| 1970-1987 | E J George |
| 1987-1990 | A N Hardacre |
| 1990- | D R Purser |

League Assistant Secretary
| Year | Assistant Secretary |
|---|---|
| 1979-1991 | W N Pember |
| 1991-1997 | J M Green |
| 1997-2000 | R C Green |
| 2000-2002 | Position vacant |
| 2002-2008 | Mrs B Summers |
| 2008-2010 | J Thomas |
| 2010-2017 | D J Birt |
| 2017- | J Lewis |
