= 1990–91 Kent Football League =

Association football league season

The 1990–91 Kent Football League season (known as the Winstonlead Kent League for sponsorship reasons) was the twenty-fifth in the history of the Kent Football League, a football competition featuring teams based in and around the county of Kent in England.

The League structure comprised two divisions: Division One and Division Two with the latter known as the Reserves Section (reserves teams were not permitted in Division One). Additionally there were two league cup competitions: the Challenge Cup for the Division One clubs and another for the teams in Division Two.

== Division One ==
Kent Football League Division One
- Season: 1990–91
- Champions: Sittingbourne
- Promoted: Sittingbourne
- Matches: 420
- Goals: 1,264 (3.01 per match)

The league featured twenty-one clubs, twenty of which competed in the previous season together with one additional club:

- Sheppey United, relegated from the Southern League

The league was won by Sittingbourne, the only Kent League winning club (as of 2024) to be unbeaten over the season; it was their third Kent League title and they were subsequently promoted to the Southern Football League.

At the end of the season both bottom clubs, Metropolitan Police (Hayes) and Sheppey United, were re-elected to continue their membership of the division.

=== League table ===
| Pos | Team | Pld | W | D | L | GF | GA | GD | Pts | Season End Notes |
|---|---|---|---|---|---|---|---|---|---|---|
| 1 | Sittingbourne | 40 | 32 | 8 | 0 | 87 | 19 | +68 | 104 | Promoted to the Southern League Southern Division |
| 2 | Cray Wanderers | 40 | 27 | 11 | 2 | 91 | 33 | +58 | 92 | |
| 3 | Herne Bay | 40 | 24 | 11 | 5 | 83 | 28 | +55 | 83 | |
| 4 | Tonbridge (Note: Tonbridge were deducted one point and one goal - the deducted goal has been reinstated in the table) | 40 | 24 | 8 | 8 | 73 | 34 | +39 | 79 (Note: Tonbridge were deducted one point.) | |
| 5 | Deal Town | 40 | 23 | 8 | 9 | 88 | 43 | +45 | 77 | |
| 6 | Faversham Town | 40 | 20 | 10 | 10 | 62 | 33 | +29 | 70 | |
| 7 | Whitstable Town | 40 | 20 | 8 | 12 | 67 | 44 | +23 | 68 | |
| 8 | Alma Swanley | 40 | 18 | 9 | 13 | 60 | 53 | +7 | 63 | |
| 9 | Slade Green | 40 | 16 | 10 | 14 | 65 | 49 | +16 | 58 | |
| 10 | Ramsgate | 40 | 16 | 9 | 15 | 60 | 63 | −3 | 57 | |
| 11 | Tunbridge Wells | 40 | 16 | 6 | 18 | 71 | 79 | −8 | 54 | |
| 12 | Chatham Town | 40 | 13 | 9 | 18 | 61 | 71 | −10 | 48 | |
| 13 | Darenth Heathside (Note: Darenth Heathside were deducted one goal - the deducted goal has been reinstated in the table) | 40 | 12 | 9 | 19 | 45 | 68 | −23 | 45 | |
| 14 | Beckenham Town | 40 | 12 | 7 | 21 | 37 | 54 | −17 | 43 | |
| 15 | Crockenhill (Note: Crockenhill were deducted one point and one goal - the deducted goal has been reinstated in the table) | 40 | 10 | 11 | 19 | 48 | 89 | −41 | 40 (Note: Crockenhill were deducted one point.) | |
| 16 | Thames Polytechnic | 40 | 10 | 7 | 23 | 49 | 76 | −27 | 37 | |
| 17 | Greenwich Borough | 40 | 10 | 5 | 25 | 49 | 77 | −28 | 35 | |
| 18 | Danson | 40 | 7 | 13 | 20 | 41 | 80 | −39 | 34 | |
| 19 | Kent Police | 40 | 8 | 9 | 23 | 51 | 77 | −26 | 33 | |
| 20 | Metropolitan Police (Hayes) | 40 | 5 | 10 | 25 | 37 | 89 | −52 | 25 | Re-elected |
| 21 | Sheppey United | 40 | 6 | 4 | 30 | 39 | 105 | −66 | 22 | Re-elected |

Source: "Winstonlead Kent League: Final Table: Division 1". Kentish Gazette. 17 May 1991. p. 67 – via British Newspaper Archive. (Note: The source table is net of the goal deductions to Crockenhill, Darenth Heathside and Tonbridge; and the 'Goals Against' total for Tonbridge and Greenwich Borough have both had one added for consistency to the table's 'Goals For' figures)
Rules for classification: 1) points; 2) goal difference; 3) number of goals scored.

=== Challenge Cup ===
The 1990–91 Kent Football League Challenge Cup was won by Faversham Town for the second occasion, their first being twenty seasons previously.

The competition, contested by all twenty-one clubs in Division One, comprised five single match tie rounds (with the first round featuring five ties) culminating in the final which was played on a neutral ground (at Whitstable Town F.C. this season).

==== Quarter-finals, Semi-finals and Final ====
Quarter-finals
Ramsgate | 0
Darenth Heathside | 2
Alma Swanley | 1
Slade Green | 0
Tunbridge Wells | 2 (Note: After extra time, score at 90 minutes: 1–1) | 2 (Note: Replay: after extra time, score at 90 minutes: 2–2)
Chatham Town | 2 | 4
Faversham Town | 7
Danson | 1

Semi-finals
Darenth Heathside | 0 (Note: After extra time, score at 90 minutes: 0–0)
Alma Swanley | 1
Chatham Town | 1
Faversham Town | 2

Final
Alma Swanley | 0
Faversham Town | 1

==== Second Round ====
- Ramsgate 2 – 1 Deal Town
- Darenth Heathside 3 – 2 Sittingbourne
- Alma Swanley 4 – 2 Whitstable Town
- Slade Green 2 – 1 Tonbridge
- Tunbridge Wells 6 – 0 Beckenham Town
- Metropolitan Police (Hayes) 1 – 3 Chatham Town
- Faversham Town 6– 0 Thames Polytechnic
- Herne Bay 0 – 1 Danson

==== First Round ====
- Ramsgate 4 – 0 Crockenhill
- Darenth Heathside 3 – 0 Cray Wanderers
- Alma Swanley 1 – 0 Kent Police
- Replay: Alma Swanley 3 – 1 Kent Police
- Herne Bay 3 – 0 Sheppey United
- Greenwich Borough 1 – 4 Danson
- Byes for the other eleven clubs

Sources:

- Final: "Results, Fixtures, Tables: Results: Saturday: Winstonlead Kent League Division 1 Cup final". Kentish Gazette. 3 May 1991. p. 71 – via British Newspaper Archive.
- Semi-finals: "Senior soccer details: Results: Saturday: Winstonlead Kent League: Division One Cup, semi-finals". Kent Messenger. 15 March 1991. p. 70 – via British Newspaper Archive.
- Quarter-finals: "Senior soccer details: Results: Saturday: Winstonlead Kent League: Division One Cup, third round". Kent Messenger. 8 February 1991. p. 71 – via British Newspaper Archive.; "Senior soccer details: Results: Tuesday: Winstonlead Kent League Cup, third round replay". Kent Messenger. 8 March 1991. p. 70 – via British Newspaper Archive.
- Second Round: "Results, Fixtures, Tables: Results: Saturday: Winstonlead Kent League: Division 1 Cup, second round". Kentish Gazette. 16 November 1990. p. 78 – via British Newspaper Archive.; "Results, Fixtures, Tables: Results: Tuesday: Winstonlead Kent League Cup, second round". Kentish Gazette. 23 November 1990. p. 78 – via British Newspaper Archive.
- First Round: "Results, Fixtures, Tables: Results: Saturday: Winstonlead Kent League: Division 1 Cup, first round". Kentish Gazette. 28 September 1990. p. 79 – via British Newspaper Archive.; "Results, Fixtures, Tables: Results: Monday: Winstonlead Kent League: Division 1 Cup, first round replay". Kentish Gazette. 9 November 1990. p. 70 – via British Newspaper Archive.

== Reserves Section ==
The letter "R" following team names indicates a club's reserves team.

Division Two featured reserves teams (which were not permitted in Division One) from clubs from Kent and the adjacent area whose first team played in Division One and other higher ranked leagues. There was a League Cup competition for the teams in the section.

=== Division Two ===
Kent Football League Division Two
- Season: 1990–91
- Champions: Canterbury City R
- Matches: 240
- Goals: 894 (3.73 per match)

The league featured sixteen reserves teams, fifteen of which had competed in the division the previous season together with one additional club:

- Deal Town R, returning after a one season absence.

The division was won by Canterbury City R.

==== League table ====
| Pos | Team | Pld | W | D | L | GF | GA | GD | Pts |
|---|---|---|---|---|---|---|---|---|---|
| 1 | Canterbury City R | 30 | 20 | 5 | 5 | 84 | 41 | +43 | 65 |
| 2 | Ashford Town R | 30 | 17 | 7 | 6 | 65 | 28 | +37 | 58 |
| 3 | Hastings Town R | 30 | 17 | 7 | 6 | 64 | 36 | +28 | 58 |
| 4 | Dover Athletic R (Note: Dover Athletic R were deducted three points and three goals – the deducted goals have been reinstated in the table) | 30 | 18 | 5 | 7 | 64 | 33 | +31 | 56 (Note: Dover Athletic R were deducted three points) |
| 5 | Fisher Athletic R | 30 | 16 | 6 | 8 | 70 | 42 | +28 | 54 |
| 6 | Cray Wanderers R | 30 | 16 | 4 | 10 | 58 | 41 | +17 | 52 |
| 7 | Sittingbourne R (Note: Sittingbourne R were deducted three points and two goals – the deducted goals have been reinstated in the table) | 30 | 12 | 10 | 8 | 72 | 45 | +27 | 43 (Note: Sittingbourne R were deducted three points) |
| 8 | Thames Polytechnic R | 30 | 12 | 7 | 11 | 48 | 38 | +10 | 43 |
| 9 | Herne Bay R | 30 | 11 | 8 | 11 | 59 | 58 | +1 | 41 |
| 10 | Whitstable Town R | 30 | 9 | 9 | 12 | 46 | 48 | −2 | 36 |
| 11 | Beckenham Town R | 30 | 8 | 10 | 12 | 50 | 49 | +1 | 34 |
| 12 | Margate R | 30 | 9 | 4 | 17 | 50 | 72 | −22 | 31 |
| 13 | Deal Town R | 30 | 9 | 2 | 19 | 54 | 74 | −20 | 29 |
| 14 | Faversham Town R (Note: Faversham Town R were deducted one point and one goal – the deducted goal has been reinstated in the table) | 30 | 8 | 4 | 18 | 46 | 100 | −54 | 27 (Note: Faversham Town R were deducted one point) |
| 15 | Ramsgate R | 30 | 6 | 7 | 17 | 37 | 67 | −30 | 25 |
| 16 | Sheppey United R (Note: Sheppey United R were deducted two goals – the deducted goals have been reinstated in the table) | 30 | 3 | 3 | 24 | 27 | 122 | −95 | 12 |

Source: "Winstonlead Kent League: Final Table: Division 1". Kentish Gazette. 17 May 1991. p. 67 – via British Newspaper Archive. (Note: The source table is net of the goal deductions to Dover Athletic R, Faversham Town R, Sheppey United R and Sittingbourne R)
Rules for classification: 1) points; 2) goal difference; 3) number of goals scored.

=== Division Two Cup ===
The 1990–91 Kent Football League Division Two Cup was won by Fisher Athletic R, the only Division 2 Cup win for the club that had won four divisional titles in the 1980s.

The competition, contested by all sixteen clubs in the division, comprised four single match tie rounds culminating in the final

==== Quarter-finals, Semi-finals and Final ====
Quarter-finals
Whitstable Town R | 2
Hastings Town R | 1
Ramsgate R | 2
Beckenham Town R | 3
Sittingbourne R | 0
Herne Bay R | 1
Fisher Athletic R | 4
Canterbury City R | 1

Semi-finals
Whitstable Town R | 1
Beckenham Town R | 5
Herne Bay R | 0 (Note: After extra time) | 1 (Note: Replay: after extra time) | 3p (Note: Penalty shots)
Fisher Athletic R | 0 | 1 | 4p

Final
Beckenham Town R | 1
Fisher Athletic R | 2

==== First Round ====
- Sheppey United R 2 – 8 Whitstable Town R
- Deal Town R 1 – 2 Hastings Town R
- Ramsgate R 2 – 1 Cray Wanderers R
- Dover Athletic R 1 – 3 Beckenham Town R
- Sittingbourne R 1 – 0 (Thames Polytechnic R
- Herne Bay R v Margate R
- Faversham Town R 0 – 4 Fisher Athletic R
- Ashford Town R 0 – 2 Canterbury City R

Sources:

- Final: "Soccer Details: Results: Monday: Winstonlead Kent League: Division 2 Cup final". Kentish Express. 9 May 1991. p. 33 – via British Newspaper Archive.
- Semi-finals: "All The Weekend Details: Winstonlead Kent League: Division 2 Cup, Semi-finals". Kent Evening Post. 8 April 1991. p. 31 – via British Newspaper Archive.; "All The Weekend Details: Winstonlead Kent League: Division 2 Cup, Semi-final replay". Kent Evening Post. 15 April 1991. p. 31 – via British Newspaper Archive.
- Quarter-finals: "Reserves book place in semis". Whitstable Times. 14 March 1991. p. 28 – via British Newspaper Archive.; "All The Weekend Details: Winstonlead Kent League: Division 2 Cup". Kent Evening Post. 18 March 1991. p. 35 – via British Newspaper Archive.; "Soccer Details: Results: Tuesday: Winstonlead Kent League Division 2 Cup, third round(sic)". Kentish Express. 21 March 1991. p. 45 – via British Newspaper Archive.; "Soccer Details: Results: Saturday: Winstonlead Kent League: Division 2 Cup, third round(sic)". Kentish Express. 28 March 1991. p. 45 – via British Newspaper Archive.
- First Round: "Results, Fixtures, Tables: Results: Saturday: Winstonlead Kent League: Division 2 Cup, second round(sic)". Kentish Gazette. 16 November 1990. p. 78 – via British Newspaper Archive.; "Results, Fixtures, Tables: Results: Tuesday: Winstonlead Kent League: Division 2 Cup, second round(sic)". Kentish Gazette. 16 November 1990. p. 78 – via British Newspaper Archive.; "Results, Fixtures, Tables: Results: Saturday: Winstonlead Kent League: Division 2 Cup, second round(sic)". Kentish Gazette. 23 November 1990. p. 78 – via British Newspaper Archive.
