= 1987–88 West Midlands (Regional) League =

Football league season

The 1987–88 West Midlands (Regional) League season was the 88th in the history of the West Midlands (Regional) League, an English association football competition for semi-professional and amateur teams based in the West Midlands county, Shropshire, Herefordshire, Worcestershire and southern Staffordshire.

== Premier Division ==
West Midlands League Premier Division
- Season: 1987–88
- Champions: Tamworth
- Promoted: Tamworth
- Matches: 306
- Goals: 992 (3.24 per match)

The Premier Division featured 18 clubs which competed in the division last season, along with one new club promoted from Division One:

- Westfields

=== League table ===
| Pos | Team | Pld | W | D | L | GF | GA | GD | Pts | Promotion or relegation |
|---|---|---|---|---|---|---|---|---|---|---|
| 1 | Tamworth | 34 | 27 | 3 | 4 | 98 | 31 | +67 | 57 | Promoted to the Southern League |
| 2 | Oldbury United | 34 | 25 | 6 | 3 | 91 | 39 | +52 | 56 | |
| 3 | Lye Town | 34 | 22 | 8 | 4 | 65 | 27 | +38 | 52 | |
| 4 | Gresley Rovers | 34 | 20 | 10 | 4 | 74 | 36 | +38 | 50 | |
| 5 | Chasetown | 34 | 22 | 4 | 8 | 74 | 40 | +34 | 48 | |
| 6 | Halesowen Harriers | 34 | 18 | 6 | 10 | 66 | 40 | +26 | 42 | |
| 7 | Malvern Town | 34 | 15 | 6 | 13 | 59 | 47 | +12 | 36 | |
| 8 | Wednesfield Social | 34 | 14 | 7 | 13 | 43 | 43 | 0 | 35 | |
| 9 | Rushall Olympic | 34 | 13 | 7 | 14 | 43 | 44 | −1 | 33 | |
| 10 | Hinckley Athletic | 34 | 11 | 9 | 14 | 58 | 58 | 0 | 31 | |
| 11 | Harrisons | 34 | 13 | 5 | 16 | 54 | 61 | −7 | 31 | |
| 12 | Blakenall | 34 | 11 | 7 | 16 | 42 | 49 | −7 | 29 | |
| 13 | Tividale | 34 | 11 | 5 | 18 | 40 | 68 | −28 | 27 | |
| 14 | Westfields | 34 | 10 | 6 | 18 | 60 | 64 | −4 | 26 | |
| 15 | Tipton Town | 34 | 7 | 9 | 18 | 38 | 56 | −18 | 23 | |
| 16 | GKN Sankeys | 34 | 7 | 7 | 20 | 46 | 73 | −27 | 21 | Resigned from the league |
| 17 | Wolverhampton United | 34 | 4 | 4 | 26 | 25 | 88 | −63 | 12 | Demoted to Division One |
| 18 | Oldswinford | 34 | 1 | 1 | 32 | 16 | 128 | −112 | 3 | |
| 19 | Brereton Social | 0 | 0 | 0 | 0 | 0 | 0 | 0 | 0 | Club folded, record expunged |

Source: nonleaguematters
Rules for classification: 1) points; 2) goal difference; 3) number of goals scored.
