= 1991–92 West Midlands (Regional) League =

The 1991–92 West Midlands (Regional) League season was the 92nd in the history of the West Midlands (Regional) League, an English association football competition for semi-professional and amateur teams based in the West Midlands county, Shropshire, Herefordshire, Worcestershire and southern Staffordshire.

== Premier Division ==
West Midlands League Premier Division
- Season: 1991–92
- Champions: Gresley Rovers
- Promoted: Gresley Rovers
- Matches: 342
- Goals: 1,028 (3.01 per match)

The Premier Division featured 17 clubs which competed in the division last season, along with two new clubs:

- Cradley Town, promoted from Division One
- Willenhall Town, relegated from the Southern Football League

=== League table ===
Pos	Team	Pld	W	D	L	GF	GA	GD	Pts	Promotion or relegation
1	Gresley Rovers	36	24	7	5	83	37	+46	79	Promoted to the Southern League
2	Paget Rangers	36	20	5	11	81	44	+37	65	
3	Stourport Swifts	36	18	10	8	62	45	+17	64	
4	Blakenall	36	17	10	9	67	49	+18	61	
5	Chasetown	36	17	10	9	47	31	+16	61	
6	Rocester	36	17	8	11	64	52	+12	59	
7	Oldbury United	36	17	7	12	61	47	+14	58	
8	Rushall Olympic	36	16	9	11	61	38	+23	57	
9	Lye Town	36	14	11	11	51	34	+17	53	
10	Halesowen Harriers	36	13	11	12	63	52	+11	50	
11	Willenhall Town	36	14	6	16	56	63	−7	48	
12	Pelsall Villa	36	12	11	13	52	58	−6	47	
13	West Bromwich Town	36	11	11	14	41	60	−19	44	
14	Cradley Town	36	12	7	17	39	56	−17	43	
15	Hinckley Athletic	36	9	7	20	36	56	−20	34	
16	Malvern Town	36	8	9	19	39	79	−40	33	Demoted to Division One
17	Wednesfield	36	8	8	20	43	69	−26	32	
18	Westfields	36	6	12	18	48	74	−26	30	
19	Oldswinford	36	7	5	24	34	84	−50	26	

Source: nonleaguematters
Rules for classification: 1) points; 2) goal difference; 3) number of goals scored.
