= Cheltenham Association Football League =

Association football league in England

- Founded: 1900
- Country: England
- Divisions: 3
- Number of clubs: 39
- Feeder to: Gloucestershire Northern Senior League
- Promotion to: Gloucestershire Northern Senior League Division Two
- Current champions: FC Wickhamford (2025–26)
- Website: cheltenhamleague.co.uk

The Cheltenham Association Football League is a football competition based in England and has a total of three divisions. Its top division, the Premier Division, is a feeder to the Gloucestershire Northern Senior League.

The Cheltenham League is affiliated to the Gloucestershire County FA.

== Background ==
The Cheltenham Association Football League is based in and around Cheltenham, providing league football for teams in a 50-mile radius of the town. The league originally began with Division One in 1900, and was won by St Paul's United. A second division was formed in 1903, and a third in 1906. More divisions continued to be instated, with seven divisions being active from 1958-1971. A senior cup also began in 1924, which is still played today.

The league system now has 3 divisions, The Premier Division, Division One, and Division Two, comprising a total of 35 teams. The Premier Division is a feeder league for the Gloucestershire Northern Senior League. The league system also hosts two cup tournaments each season.

Among the clubs that have left the Cheltenham League and now compete at a higher level are:

- Bishop's Cleeve, Southern League Division One South
- Cheltenham Town, EFL League Two
- Cirencester Town, Hellenic League Premier Division
- Cheltenham Saracens, Hellenic League Division One
- Evesham United, Southern League Premier Division South
- Gloucester City, Southern League Premier Division South

The Herd are another side that progressed from the Cheltenham League to the Hellenic Football League and in more recent years were known as Cirencester United, but the club has now disbanded.

== Member clubs 2026–27 ==
- Premier Division
- Bibury First
- Bishops Cleeve A
- Cheltenham Civil Service Reserves
- FC Lakeside 1st
- FC Wickhamford Firsts
- Mickleton Rangers 1st
- Montpellier (Cheltenham) 1st
- Shurdington Rovers 1st
- Southside Star First
- Whaddon United Reserves
- Division One
- AFC Cheltenham 1st
- AFC Worcester Forge
- Bredon Reserves
- Charlton Rovers Firsts
- Cheltenham Saracens A
- Cheltenham United First
- Falcons Reserves
- Hanley Swan Firsts
- Kings First
- Leckhampton Rovers First
- Tewkesbury Town Saturday Development
- Welland Reserves
- Division Two
- Bibury Reserves
- Bishops Cleeve B
- Cheltenham Saracens B
- FC Lakeside 2nds
- Leckhampton Rovers 2nd
- Montpellier (Cheltenham) Reserves
- Prestbury Rovers First
- St Pauls United 1st
- Tredworth Tigers 1st
- Whaddon United 3rds
- Winchcombe Town Reserves

== Champions ==
=== Division One ===
Year	Division 1 Champions
1900–01	St Paul's United
1901–02	St Paul's United
1902–03	St Paul's United
1903–04	Charlton Rangers
1904–05	St Paul's United
1905–06	St Paul's United
1906–07	Gloucester City
1907–08	Tewkesbury
1908–09	Tewkesbury
1909–10	Evesham United
1910–11	Cheltenham Town
1911–12	Evesham United
1912–13	Evesham United
1913–14	Cheltenham Town
1915–20	No competition due to First World War
1920–21	Tewkesbury
1921–22	Tewkesbury
1922–23	Ashton-Under-Hill
1923–24	Ashton-Under-Hill
1924–25	Sunningend
1925–26	Leckhampton
1926–27	Alderton
1927–28	Cirencester Town
1928–29	St Paul's College
1929–30	Cirencester Town
1930–31	Moreton Town
1931–32	Bishop's Cleeve
1932–33	Broadway Athletic
1933–34	Broadway Athletic
1934–35	Bishop's Cleeve
1935–36	Charlton Kings
1936–37	Charlton Kings
1937–38	Charlton Kings
1938–39	Sunningend
1939–45	No competition due to Second World War
1945–46	1st Infantry Hold Battalion
1946–47	Moreton Town
1947–48	Charlton Kings
1948–49	Cirencester Town
1949–50	Bourton Rovers
1950–51	Tewkesbury YMCA
1951–52	Smiths Athletic
1952–53	Rotol
1953–54	Moreton Town
1954–55	Cirencester Town
1955–56	Cirencester Town
1956–57	Smiths Athletic
1957–58	Smiths Athletic
1958–59	St Marks CC
1959–60	Cheltenham Town Colts
1960–61	Broadway United
1961–62	Bishop's Cleeve
1962–63	St Marks CC
1963–64	Bishop's Cleeve
1964–65	Tewkesbury YMCA
1965–66	Bishop's Cleeve
1966–67	Bishop's Cleeve
1967–68	Moreton Town
1968–69	Tewkesbury YMCA
1969–70	St Marks CC

Year	Division 1 Champions
1970–71	St Marks CC
1971–72	Winchcombe Town
1972–73	Brockworth
1973–74	Whaddon United
1974–75	Whaddon United
1975–76	Whaddon United
1976–77	The Herd
1977–78	Borough United
1978–79	Borough United
1979–80	Campden Town
1980–81	Borough United
1981–82	Bishop's Cleeve
1982–83	Borough United
1983–84	The Herd
1984–85	Borough United
1985–86	Borough United
1986–87	Borough United
1987–88	Borough United
1988–89	Borough United
1989–90	Borough United
1990–91	Endsleigh
1991–92	Brockworth
1992–93	Bourton Rovers
1993–94	Crescent United
1994–95	Eagle Star
1995–96	Cheltenham Civil Service
1996–97	Tewkesbury YMCA
1997–98	Woodmancote
1998–99	Bourton Rovers
1999–2000	Bredon
2000–01	Christchurch Nomads
2001–02	Warden Hill United
2002–03	Bishop's Cleeve Reserves
2003–04	Newton Heath
2004–05	Gala Wilton
2005–06	Star
2006–07	Hatherley Rangers
2007–08	Winchcombe Town
2008–09	FC Barometrics
2009–10	Moreton Rangers
2010–11	Real Whaddon
2011–12	Real Whaddon
2012–13	Bibury
2013–14	Charlton Rovers
2014–15	Whaddon United
2015–16	FC Lakeside
2016–17	Falcons
2017–18	Cheltenham Civil Service
2018–19	Andoversford
2019–20	Not Completed due to COVID-19
2020–21	Not Completed due to COVID-19
2021–22	Cheltenham Civil Service Reserves
	(Div-One South)
2021–22	Whaddon United (Div-One North)
2022–23	AFC Kempsey
2023–24	Montpellier Firsts
2024–25	Montpellier
2025–26	Shurdington Rovers

=== Divisions Two to Six (recent champions) ===
Season	Division Two	Division Three	Division Four	Division Five	Division Six
2000–01	Dynamos	Newton Heath	Phoenix United	Warden Hill United Reserves	
2001–02	Smiths Athletic Reserves	Bishop's Cleeve 'A'	Warden Hill United Reserves	Northway Reserves	
2002–03	Newton Heath	Warden Hill Reserves	Northway Reserves	Naunton Park	
2003–04	Rowanfield United	St Marks Reserves	Charlton Rovers	Tewkesbury YMCA Reserves	
2004–05	Bishop's Cleeve 'A'	Gala Wilton Reserves	Tewkesbury YMCA Reserves	Tewkesbury Dynamos	
2005–06	Cheltenham Civil Service Reserves	High Tech Rangers	AC Olympia	Tewkesbury Town	
2006–07	Finlay Rovers	Whaddon United	Tewkesbury Town	Churchdown Panthers	
2007–08	Whaddon United	Winchcombe Town Reserves	Tewkesbury Rovers	FC Barometrics Reserves	
2008–09	Whaddon United Reserves	Broadway United	Churchdown Panthers	Cheltenham & Gloucester	Cheltenham Saracens 'C'
2009–10	Real Whaddon	Gloucester Elmleaze	Cheltenham & Gloucester	Cheltenham Saracens 'B'	FC Lakeside
2010–11	Falcons	Smiths Athletic Reserves	RSG	FC Lakeside	Cheltonians
2011–12	Bibury	Hanley Swan	FC Lakeside	Welland	Newlands Athletic
2012–13	Gala Wilton Reserves	FC Lakeside	Priors	Pittville United	Hatherley
2013–14	Churchdown Panthers	Cheltenham Patriots	Shurdington Rovers Reserves	Northway	FC Lakeside Reserves
2014–15	Cheltenham Civil Service Reserves	Welland	Northway	FC Lakeside Reserves	Malvern Vale
2015–16	Welland	Shurdington Rovers	Bredon Reserves	Apperley Reserves	
2016–17	Andoversford	FC Barometrics Thirds	Cheltenham Civil Service Fourths	St Pauls United	
2017–18	Cheltenham Civil Service Reserves	St Pauls United	Prestbury Rovers Reserves		
2018–19	AFC Renegades	Malvern Vale	FC Lakeside Reserves		
2019–20	Not Completed – COVID-19	Not Completed – COVID-19	Not Completed – COVID-19		
2020–21	Not Completed – COVID-19	Not Completed – COVID-19	Not Completed – COVID-19		
2021–22	Whaddon United (Div-One North)	Kempsey Corinthians	Montpellier		

Season	Premier Division	Division One	Division Two	Division Three
2022–23	Whaddon United	AFC Kempsey	Montpellier	Montpellier Reserves
2023-24	AFC Kempsey	Montpellier Firsts	Bredon Reserves	
2024-25	Fintan	Montpellier	Shurdington Rovers	
2025-26	Tewkesbury Town Reserves	Shurdington Rovers	AFC Worcester Forge	

== List of recent play-off winners ==
Season	Division Two	Division Three	Division Four
2017–18	FC Barometrics Reserves	AFC Renegades	Malvern Vale Academy
2018–19	Bredon Reserves	Leckhampton Rovers	Malvern Cave

== Cup winners ==
Senior Charities Cup
Year	Winners
1924-25	Ashton-Under-Hill
1925-26	Leckhampton
1926-27	Alderton Lead
1927-28	Leckhampton
1928-29	Bishops Cleeve
1929-30	Moreton Town
1930-31	Broadway Athletic
1931-32	Naunton Park United
1932-33	Cheltenham Town
1933-34	Broadway Athletic
1934-35	Moreton Town
1935-36	All Saints Old Boys
1936-37	Bishop's Cleeve
1937-38	Charlton Kings
1938-39	Charlton Kings
1946-47	Broadway United
1947-48	Charlton Kings
1948-49	Cirencester Town
1949-50	Cirencester Town
1950-51	Cheltenham Town Colts
1951-52	Cheltenham YMCA
1952-53	Tewkesbury YMCA
1953-54	Moreton Town
1954-55	St Marks CC
1955-56	Cirencester Town
1956-57	Smiths Athletic
1957-58	Cheltenham Town Colts
1958-59	Broadway United
1959-60	Cheltenham Town Colts
1960-61	Dowty Staverton
1961-62	St Marys CC
1962-63	Bishops Cleeve
1963-64	Shipton Oliffe
1964-65	Bishops Cleeve
1965-66	St Marks CC
1966-67	Bishops Cleeve
1967-68	St Marks CC
1968-69	Tewkesbury YMCA
1969-70	St Marks CC
1970-71	Bourton Rovers
1971-72	Prestbury
1972-73	Bishops Cleeve
1973-74	Glos City YMCA
1974-75	Whaddon United
1975-76	Broadway United
1976-77	The Herd
1977-78	Brockworth
1978-79	Borough United
1979-80	Campden Town
1980-81	Campdent Town
1981-82	Bishop's Cleeve
1982-83	Borough United
1983-84	Borough United
1984-85	Borough United
1985-86	Crescent United
1986-87	The Herd
1987-88	Brockworth
1988-89	Borough United
1989-90	Borough United
1990-91	St Marks CA II
1991-92	Brockworth
1992-93	Northleach Town
1993-94	Crescent United
1994-95	AFC Innsworth
1995-96	Campden Town
1996-97	Tewkesbury YMCA
1997-98	Campden Town
1998-99	Bourton Rovers
1999-2000	Bredon
2000-01	Winchcombe Town
2001-02	Tewkesbury YMCA
2002-03	Newton Heath
2003-04	Newton Heath
2004-05	Hatherley Rangers
2005-06	Winchcombe Town
2006-07	Endsleigh
2007-08	FC Barometrics
2008-09	Endsleigh
2009-10	Kings
2010-11	Whaddon United
2011-12	Real Whaddon
2012-13	Upton Town
2013-14	FC Lakeside
2014-15	Whaddon United
2015-16	Churchdown Panthers
2016-17	Dowty Dynamos
2017-18	Cheltenham Civil Service
2018-19	Tewkesbury Town
2019-20	Cancelled - Covid
2020-21	Cancelled - Covid
2021-22	AFC Kempsey
2022-23	AFC Kempsey
2023-24	Winchcombe Town
2024-25	Cheltenham United
2025-26	Shurdington Rovers

Junior Charities Cup
Year	Winners
1924-25	St Marks
1925-26	Andoversford
1926-27	Charlton St Marys
1927-28	Gotherington
1928-29	Broadway Athletic
1929-30	Broadway Athletic
1930-31	Ashton-Under-Hill
1931-32	Outcasts
1932-33	Dumbleton
1933-34	Hayles United
1934-35	Bishop's Cleeve II
1935-36	Andoversford
1936-37	Ryeworth
1937-38	Post Office
1938-39	Alderton
1946-47	Cheltenham YMCA
1947-48	St Paul's United
1948-49	Bredon
1949-50	Andoversford
1950-51	Co-op Employees
1951-52	Winchcombe Town II
1952-53	Andoversford
1953-54	Victory Club
1954-55	The Rovers
1955-56	RAOC
1956-57	Shipton Oliffe
1957-58	Gloster Aircraft
1958-59	Alstone Dynamos
1959-60	Blockley
1960-61	Brockworth
1961-62	Gloster Aircraft/Telehoist (joint)
1962-63	St Marks CA II
1963-64	St Marks CA II
1964-65	Rissington United
1965-66	Tewkesbury YMCA II
1966-67	Willersey
1967-68	St Paul's Rangers
1968-69	St Peters Rangers
1969-70	Prestbury Rovers
1970-71	Cheltenham YMCA
1971-72	Borough United
1972-73	Toddngton & District
1973-74	Winchcombe Town II
1974-75	Tewkesbury
1975-76	Shurdington Rovers
1976-77	Bourton Rovers
1977-78	Lynworth United
1978-79	Cheltenham Rovers
1979-80	Tewkesbury YMCA
1980-81	Eagle Star
1981-82	Brockworth
1982-83	Telehoist
1983-84	Tirley Rovers
1984-85	Dowty Electrics
1985-86	Smiths Athletic III
1986-87	Prestbury Rovers
1987-88	Endsleigh
1988-89	Newtown Wanderers
1989-90	Woodmancote II
1990-91	Endsleigh II
1991-92	Smiths Athletic III
1992-93	Brockworth II
1993-94	Endsleigh
1994-95	Shipton Oliffe
1995-96	Winchcombe Town
1996-97	Winchcombe Town
1997-98	FC Staverton
1998-99	Gas Green
1999-2000	Newton Heath
2000-01	Phoenix United
2001-02	Andoversford
2002-03	Newton Heath Res
2003-04	Charlton Rovers
2004-05	Naunton Park
2005-06	Woodmancote
2006-07	Whaddon United
2007-08	Tewkesbury Rovers
2008-09	Tewkesbury Rovers
2009-10	Hanley Swan
2010-11	Tewkesbury Town
2011-12	Real Whaddon
2012-13	Upton Town
2013-14	Cheltenham Patriots
2014-15	Leckhampton Rovers
2015-16	Bredon Reserves
2016-17	Bredon Reserves
2017-18	Tewkesbury Town
2018-19	Bishops Cleeve A
2019-20	Cancelled - Covid
2020-21	Malvern Vale
2021-22	Whaddon United
2022-23	Bishops Cleeve A
2023-24	Bishops Cleeve A
2024-25	Whaddon United Reserves
2025-26	Bishops Cleeve A

Minor Charities Cup
Year	Winners
1963-64	Tewkesbury YMCA II
1964-65	Rowanfield United
1965-66	St Marks CA II
1966-67	Weston United
1967-68	Leonard Stace Sports
1968-69	Brockworth II
1969-70	Cheltenham United Services
1970-71	Bourton Rovers II
1971-72	Toddington & District
1972-73	Gas Green Youth
1973-74	Kings School Old Boys
1974-75	Blockley II
1975-76	Campden Town II
1976-77	Guiting Power
1977-78	Rowanfield United II
1978-79	Shipton Oliffe II
1979-80	Kingsditch Rovers
1980-81	Telehoist
1981-82	Tirley Rovers
1982-83	Broadway United II
1983-84	Andoversford II
1984-85	Arle II
1985-86	Endsleigh
1986-87	Woodpeckers Athletic
1987-88	Endsleigh
1988-89	Eagle Star II
1989-90	Winchcombe Town II
1990-91	Cheltenham Saracens III
1991-92	Dowty Sports
1992-93	Boddington
1993-94	Hatherley Rangers
1994-95	Crescent United II
1995-96	Crescent United II
1996-97	Cleeve United
1997-98	Winchcombe Town II
1998-99	Whitbread Flowers
1999-2000	Cheltenham Civil Service III
2000-01	Warden Hill United II
2001-02	St Marks III
2002-03	Charlton Rovers
2003-04	Belmore Jags II
2004-05	AC Olympia
2005-06	Tewkesbury Town
2006-07	Sherborne Harriers
2007-08	C & G
2008-09	C & G
2009-10	Cheltenham Saracens IV
2010-11	AC Olympia Reserves
2011-12	Welland
2012-13	Dowty Dynamos
2013-14	FC Lakeside Reserves
2014-15	FC Lakeside Reserves
2015-16	Apperley Reserves
2016-17	St Pauls United
2017-18	AFC Renegades
2018-19	FC Lakeside Reserves
2019-20	Cancelled - Covid
2020-21	AFC Cheltenham
2021-22	AFC Kempsey
2022-23	Montpellier 1sts XI
2023-24	Kings
2024-25	Montpellier
2025-26	Mickleton Rangers

== Trophy winners ==
Senior Trophy Cup
=== Year ===	Winners
2015-16	Churchdown Panthers
2016-17	Tewkesbury Town
2017-18	Cheltenham Civil Service
2018-19	Brockworth Albion Reserves

Primary Trophy Cup
=== Year ===	Winners
2015-16	FC Lakeside Reserves
2016-17	Kings FC Reserves
2017-18	Cheltenham Civil Service III
2018-19	Prestbury Rovers Reserves

Bill Meadows Memorial Trophy
Year	Winners
1992-93	Bourton Rovers
1993-94	Woodmancote
1994-95	Eagle Star
1995-96	Not Awarded
1996-97	M.Barnfield
1997-98	C.Lewis
1998-99	P.Daly
1999-2000	A.Stiley
2000-01	M.Huck
2001-02	P.Langley
2002-03	A.Hann
2003-04	M.Huck
2004-05	G.Pearson
2005-06	A.Hann
2006-07	A.Richards
2007-08	A.Johnson
2008-09	L.Beames

== League officers history ==
League Presidents
Year	President
1933-1934	Sir Walter Preston
1936-1939	Mr A.C. White
1939-1945	Mr D.L.Lipson MP
1945-1959	Mr H.F. Midwinter
1959-1984	Mr J.B.Ingram
1984-1991	Mr W.H.Meadows
1991-2004	Mr R.J. Lawrence
2004-2006	Mr A.C.D. Barrett
2006-2012	Mr J.W.V. Crowther
2012- present	Mr P.G.Cook

League Chairmen
Year	Chairman
1899-1937	Mr A.C.White
1937-1945	Mr H.F.Midwinter
1945-1946	Mr H.C. Ward
1946-1982	Mr J.B. Ingram
1982-1986	Mr A Birt
1986-2012	Mr P.G.Cook
2012-	Mr N Oram

League Vice-Chairman
Year	Vice-chairman
1906-1907	Mr E D Ricketts
1907-1909	Mr W Henry
1910-1914	Mr H Parker
1919-1920	Mr H C Ward
1920-1931	Mr F E Eager
1927-1929	Mr E Featherstone
1927-1937	Mr H F Midwinter
1927-1931	Mr F Minett
1927-1931	Mr W S Butler
1929-1931	Mr H C Ward
1929-1931	Mr P E Close
1937-1945	Mr H C Ward
1945-1946	Mr J B Ingram
1946-1951	Mr J K Armstrong
1951-1971	Mr W Allen
1962-1967	Mr A E Errington
1971-1973	Mr A Merrett
1973-1982	Mr A Birt
1982-1986	Mr P G Cook
1967-1984	Mr W H Meadows
1986-2004	Mr A C D Barrett
1989-2008	Mr J W V Crowther
2004-2017	Mr R Attwood
2008-	Mr T R Onions
2015-	Mr B Hill

League Secretaries
Year	=== Secretary ===
1899-1900	Mr G T Clarke
1900-1905	Mr W J Lawrence
1905-1907	Mr F S Compton
1907-1909	Mr H C Ward
1909-1912	Mr C A Morgan
1912-1914	Mr C W Barrett
1914-1914	Mr T D Owen
1919-1920	Mr C A Morgan / Mr P E Close
1920-1922	Mr J E Green
1922-1925	Mr H C Ward
1925-1929	Mr P E Close
1929-1932	Mr H G A Knight
1932-1933	Mr P E Close
1933-1946	Mr J B Ingram
1946-1953	Mr A Daft
1953-1959	Mr A E Errington
1959-1984	Mr W H Meadows
1984-1994	Mr R McBeth
1994-1997	Mr R J D Price
1997-2002	Mr M J Simpson
2002-2004	Mr P H Jurd
2004-2010	Mr N D Oram
2010-	Mr I Hamilton

League Assistant Secretaries
Year	Assistant Secretary
1924-1932	Mr F Hobbs
1951-1953	Mr A E Errington
1953-1956	Mr L Sumner
1956-1965	Mr R L J Hamblin
1965-1967	Mr R E Hogg
1967-1986	Mr P G Cook
1994-1997	Mr M J Simpson
1999-2001	Mr R Cottle
2001-2004	Mr P H Jurd
2004-2019	Mr J Hunt (fixtures)
2012-	Mr T Holmes (Disciplinary / Rule Infringement)

League Referee's Secretaries
Year	Referee's Secretary
1904-1905	Mr C W Tyler
1906-1925	Mr P E Close
1928-1932	Mr F Hobbs
1932-1935	Mr E C Hinks
1935-1949	Mr A E Errington
1949-1962	Mr J P De La Mar
1962-1972	Mr A G S Wilcox
1972-1982	Mr J W V Crowther
1982-1991	Mr B J Didcote
1991-1994	Mr R McBeth
1994-2010	Mr A Stiley
2010-2012	Mr C Williams
2012-2016	Mr P Daly
2016-2019	Mr I Swales
2019-	Mr M Pates

League Registration Secretaries
Year	Registration Secretary
1909-1911	Mr W Haden
1912-1914	Mr H C Ward
1919-1920	Mr P E Close
1920-1921	Mr J G Ayres
1922-1924	Mr F Minett
1924-1928	Mr P H Brown
1928-1953	Mr W Allen
1953-1964	Mr A Merrett
1964-1972	Mr A Birt
1972-1986	Mr A G S Wilcox
1986-1994	Mr R J D Price
1994-1995	Mr I Hamilton
1995-2003	Mr G Barnickle
2003-2007	Mr T R Onions
2007-	Mr P Tustain

League Treasurers
Year	Treasurer
1899-1905	Mr W J Lawrence
1905-1907	Mr F S Compton
1909-1912	Mr C A Morgan
1920-1929	Mr H C Ward
1929-1930	Mr C H Denley
1930-1931	Mr F Eager
1931-1947	Mr P E Close
1947-1959	Mr W H Meadows
1959-1966	Mr A E Errington
1966-1997	Mr A C D Barrett
1997-2001	Mr R J D Price
2001-2009	Mr L G Fisher
2009-2018	Mr M Neave
2018-	Mr I Smith
