= Pinner F.C. =

Pinner
- Full name: Pinner Football Club
- Founded: 1892
- Dissolved: 1961
- Ground: The Croft, Pinner

Pinner Football Club was a football club based in Pinner, England.

== History ==
Founded in 1892, Pinner spent their formative years in the Middlesex Senior League and the London League, joining the Spartan League in 1927. In 1938, Pinner won the Spartan League Division Two. Following World War II, Pinner entered the FA Cup for the first time in 1945, losing 2–1 against Wealdstone in the preliminary round. In 1952, Pinner left the Spartan League, joining the Southern Amateur League until they folded in 1961.

== Ground ==
The club initially played at Cuckoo Hill Road in Pinner, before moving to The Croft in 1957.

== Records ==
- Best FA Cup performance: Preliminary round, 1945–46, 1947–48
