= Dunstable F.C. =

English football club

Coordinates: 51°53′34″N 0°32′21″W

Dunstable
- Full name: Dunstable Football Club
- Founded: 2026
- Ground: Creasey Park, Dunstable
- Capacity: 3,065
- Chairman: Simon Bullard & Matt Carrington
- Manager: Micky Nathan & Steve O'Reilly
- League: Spartan South Midlands League Premier Division

Dunstable Football Club is a football club based in Dunstable, Bedfordshire, England. Affiliated with the Bedfordshire County Football Association, they are currently members of the Spartan South Midlands League Premier Division and play at Creasey Park.

== History ==
The club was established in 2026 by a merger of AFC Dunstable and Dunstable Town and was placed in the Premier Division of the Spartan South Midlands League; Dunstable Town had been playing in the division prior to the merger, while AFC Dunstable were in Division One Central of the Southern League at the end of the 2025–26 season and would likely have been relegated to the same division.

== Ground ==
Both predecessor clubs had played at Creasey Park, originally the home ground of Dunstable Town and named after Wally Creasey, one of the first directors of the club. When the new club was established it continued playing at Creasey Park.

== Records ==
- Best FA Cup performance: First qualifying round, 2026–27
- Best FA Vase performance: First round, 2026–27
