= Viking Greenford F.C. =

Viking Greenford
- Full name: Viking Greenford Football Club
- Founded: 1945
- Dissolved: 2003
- Ground: Avenue Park, Greenford
- 2002–03: Combined Counties League, 24th

Viking Greenford Football Club were a football club based in Greenford, Middlesex, England. They played at Avenue Park.

== History ==
The club was founded by the teenage Roy Bartlett, father of professional player Gordon Bartlett, in 1945 as Viking, growing out of a works team at the Associated Equipment Company factory in Southall where Roy had been employed during the war. An adventurous football romantic with an indefatigable appetite for planning and organisation, Roy believed in football's ability to bridge geographic and political distances. He was also quick to recognise the new opportunities for adventure that new and enterprising tour operators could offer working-class boys like himself, and the club eventually became one of the most prolific touring clubs in English amateur football history.

Their first match was played at Ravenor Park in Greenford against 342 Squadron Air Training Corps and resulted in a 13–0 defeat. They subsequently joined the Ealing Youth League, and in 1948 the club played their first overseas fixture, a 6–3 defeat to S.K. Furness of Belgium. This maiden voyage made Viking the first English youth club to play in Europe following the Second World War.

The 1950s saw them join and progress through five divisions of the Dauntless League. They then joined the Amateur Football Alliance and were admitted to the Nemean League, by which time they had become Viking Sports after gaining affiliated teams from different sports. In 1953, the club hosted their first foreign visitors, Fleurbaix of France, at nearby Southall FC’s Western Road ground. Having finished as runners-up in Division Two in 1963–64, the club were promoted to Division One. Their first season in Division One saw them finish as runners-up, and in 1965–66 they were league champions. In 1966 they moved to Avenue Park in Greenford.

In 1969 the club joined the Premier Division of the Middlesex League. They finished as runners-up in 1978–79, and after a sixth-place finish the following season, the club joined Division One of the Hellenic League. In 1985–86 they won Division One, earning promotion to the Premier Division. However, they were relegated back to Division One after finishing bottom of the Premier Division in 1988–89. In 1989 a disastrous arson attack by vandals destroyed the clubhouse and dressing rooms at Avenue Park.

In 1991 the club transferred to the Combined Counties League, and in 1999 renamed themselves Viking Greenford.

After finishing bottom of the league in 2002–03 and unable to finance themselves for the following season, the club folded. Their last manager was former Wimbledon FC and Leyton Orient midfielder Steve Parsons.,

During their history the club played numerous friendly matches against European clubs on a regular basis, with a total of 92 matches at home and abroad. A tour of the Soviet Union in 1965 included a match against FC Desna Chernihiv at their Yuri Gagarin Stadium, which they lost 10–1. One match against Stade Portelois drew a crowd of 3,000 to Griffin Park. A club trip to Czechoslovakia in 1968 unexpectedly coincided with the sudden Soviet invasion of the country following the Prague Spring, and the team were forced to make a 300-mile dash in their coach for the border with Austria, in order to avoid becoming trapped in the country.

Former players who appeared for Viking Greenford and later went on to notable professional careers at the highest level include Alan Devonshire and Les Ferdinand.

== Honours ==
- Hellenic League
  - Division One champions 1985–86
- Nemean League
  - Division One champions 1965–66

== Records ==
- Best FA Cup performance: Second qualifying round, 1993–94
- Best FA Vase performance: Second round, 1991–92
- Best FA Youth Cup performance: Second round proper (last 64), 1996–97
