= Sharpness A.F.C. =

Association football club in England

Sharpness
- Full name: Sharpness Football Club
- Founded: 1900
- Ground: Hamfields Leisure
- League: Hellenic League Division One
- 2025–26: Gloucestershire County League, 1st of 17 (promoted)
- Website: sharpnessafc.co.uk
Home colours	Away colours

Sharpness Football Club is a football club based in Berkeley, Gloucestershire, England. They are currently members of the Hellenic League Division One.

== History ==
Originally formed in 1900, Sharpness spent much of their history in the Gloucestershire Northern Senior League (GNSL), and in 1968 were founder members of the Gloucestershire County League (GCL). In 1984 they joined the Hellenic League, but in 1990 the expense of ground-sharing with Forest Green Rovers forced Sharpness to resign from the Hellenic League. They again played in the GNSL before being promoted to the GCL in 2019.

In 2026, the club was admitted into the Hellenic League Division One.

== Ground ==
The original ground, known as The Port, was in Sharpness, Gloucestershire on land that was leased at a rent of £1.00 per year. In 1988 Sharpness were forced to leave The Port when the landlord (British Waterways) required the land for development. For three seasons the club shared The Lawn Ground with Forest Green Rovers, then played at Berkeley Vale School before moving to Hamfields Leisure Centre (close to Berkeley nuclear power station) in 2019.

== Records ==
- FA Cup
  - Second Qualifying Round 1985–86, 1986–87
- FA Vase
  - Fifth Round 1984–85
