= Bishop's Cleeve F.C. =

English football club

Coordinates: 51°56′15″N 2°3′29″W

Bishops Cleeve
- Full name: Bishops Cleeve Football Club
- Nickname: The Mitres
- Founded: 1905
- Ground: Kayte Lane, Bishop's Cleeve
- Capacity: 1,500
- Chairman: Clive Rawlings
- Manager: Paul Collicutt
- League: Southern League Division One South
- 2025–26: Southern League Division One South, 6th of 22
Home colours	Away colours

Bishops Cleeve Football Club is a semi-professional football club based in Bishop's Cleeve, near Cheltenham, Gloucestershire, England. They are currently members of the Southern League Division One South and play at Kayte Lane. Nicknamed 'the Mitres', the club are affiliated to the Gloucestershire County FA.

== History ==
Formed in 1905, the club initially played in the Cheltenham League. They won Division Two in 1924–25 and again in 1930–31. After being promoted to Division One, they won the league title in 1931–32 and 1934–35. After World War II they won Division Two in 1958–59, before going on to win Division One in 1961–62 and 1963–64. Following back-to-back titles in 1965–66 and 1966–67, the club moved up to Division Two of the Gloucestershire Northern Senior League. They won Division Two at the first attempt, and after earning promotion to Division One, went on to win back-to-back titles in 1968–69 and 1969–70. A third Division One title was won in 1972–73.

In 1983 Bishops Cleeve moved up to Division One of the Hellenic League. They won the division in 1986–87, earning promotion to the Premier Division. They won the Premier Division Cup in 1987–88, but were relegated back to Division One after finishing bottom of the Premier Division in 1991–92. League restructuring in 2000 saw them placed in Division One West, and after finishing as runners-up in 2000–01, they were promoted back to the Premier Division. In 2005–06 the club finished as Premier Division runners-up, earning promotion to Division One Midlands of the Southern League. They were transferred to Division One South & West in 2008. After finishing bottom of the division in 2017–18, the club were relegated to the Premier Division of the Hellenic League. In 2021–22 they won the Hellenic League title, earning promotion back to Division One South of the Southern League.

The 2024–25 season saw Bishops Cleeve finish third in Division One South, qualifying for the promotion play-offs. They went on to lose 3–2 after extra time to Malvern Town in the semi-finals.

== Ground ==
The club originally played at a ground on Stoke Road. It was redeveloped in the early 1970s, and was officially reopened by FA Secretary Ted Croker in 1971. However, by the 1990s the club were required to leave Stoke Road to maintain their Hellenic League status, resulting in them spending several seasons groundsharing at Moreton Town, Wollen Sports, Forest Green Rovers and Evesham United. Permission was given for a new ground at Kayte Lane in 1997 and following a new stand and floodlights being installed, the club returned to the town in 2002. A new clubhouse was completed in 2004. It has a capacity of 1,500.

During refurbishments in 2021–22, including the installation of an artificial pitch and new floodlights, the club played at Evesham United's Jubilee Stadium.

== Coaching staff ==
Name	Position
Manager	Paul Collicutt
Coach	Gary Baines
Coach	Tommy Callinan
Coach	Patrick Cleal
Coach	Matt Jeynes
Coach	Edward Ward
Physio	Alice Major
Source: Bishops Cleeve FC

== Honours ==
- Hellenic League
  - Premier Division champions 2021–22
  - Premier Division Cup winners 1987–88
  - Division One champions 1986–87
- Gloucestershire Northern Senior League
  - Division One champions 1968–69, 1969–70, 1972–73
  - Division Two champions 1967–68
- Cheltenham League
  - Division One champions 1931–32, 1934–35, 1961–62, 1963–64, 1965–66, 1966–67
  - Division Two champions 1924–25, 1930–31, 1958–59
  - Senior Charities Cup winners 1928–29, 1936–37, 1962–63, 1964–65, 1966–67

== Records ==
- Best FA Cup performance: Fourth qualifying round, 2005–06
- Best FA Trophy performance: First round, 2025–26
- Best FA Vase performance: Third round, 2005–06
- Record attendance: 1,365 vs Hereford, Southern League Division One South & West, 27 December 2016
- Most appearances: John Skeen
- Most goals: Kevin Slack

== See also ==
- Bishop's Cleeve F.C. players
- Bishop's Cleeve F.C. managers
