= Cirencester Town F.C. =

Association football club in England

Coordinates: 51.71175°N 1.944542°W

Cirencester Town
- Full name: Cirencester Town Football Club
- Nickname: The Centurions
- Founded: 1889
- Ground: Corinium Stadium, Cirencester
- Capacity: 4,500 (550 seated)
- Chairman: Steve Abbley
- Manager: James Mortimer-Jones
- League: Hellenic League Premier Division
- 2024–25: Hellenic League Premier Division, 15th of 20
Home colours	Away colours

Cirencester Town Football Club is a football club based in Cirencester, Gloucestershire, England. Affiliated to the Gloucestershire County FA, the club are currently members of the Hellenic League Premier Division and play at the Corinium Stadium.

== History ==
The club was established in October 1889. They played in the Cheltenham League, winning the Division One title in 1927–28 and again in 1929–30. They joined the Gloucestershire Northern Senior League in 1935, but left after two season. Returning to the Cheltenham League, they were Division One champions again in 1948–49, before winning back-to-back titles in 1954–55 and 1955–56. In 1957 they rejoined the Gloucestershire Northern Senior League, but left again after finishing second-from-bottom in 1960–61. However, they returned for the 1962–63 season. They left the league again at the end of the 1963–64 season, but returned in 1965 and were runners-up in 1965–66, before going on to win back-to-back titles in 1966–67 and 1967–68.

In 1968 Cirencester were founder members of the Gloucestershire County League, but after a single season in the new league they moved up to the Premier Division of the Hellenic League. They were relegated to Division One at the end of the 1971–72 season, but were promoted back to the Premier Division after winning Division One in 1973–74. The club returned to Division One after finishing bottom of the Premier Division in the 1977–78 season.

The 1990–91 season saw the club finish as Division One runners-up, earning promotion to the Premier Division. They were Premier Division runners-up the following season, and won the league in 1995–96, earning promotion to Division One South of the Southern League. The season also saw them win the Gloucestershire Senior Cup, beating Endsleigh 2–1 in the final. The division was renamed Division One West in 1999, and after finishing third in 2003–04, the club were promoted to the Premier Division.

The next few years saw Cirencester becoming a yo-yo club as they were relegated in 2007–08 and then promoted in 2009–10 after finishing fifth and winning the promotion play-offs, beating AFC Totton 3–2 in the semi-final and Bridgwater Town 4–3 in the final. They were relegated again at the end of the 2011–12 season after finishing bottom of the Premier Division, but returned to the division after winning Division One South & West in 2013–14. They won the Gloucestershire Senior Cup again in 2014–15, beating Shortwood United in the final. In 2018–19 the club were runners-up in Division One South, qualifying for the promotion play-offs. However, they lost 2–1 to Cinderford Town in the semi-finals. The club finished third in 2021–22 season, going on to lose 4–1 to Winchester City in the play-off semi-finals. They were then transferred to Division One Central of the Southern League. At the end of the 2023–24 season, in which they had finished sixth in the division, the club were voluntarily relegated to the Premier Division of the Hellenic League.

=== Development team ===
The Development Team, born out of the previous season's Under-16s team, began in the 2009–10 season playing in the Uhlsport Hellenic League Reserve Division 2 West, and won the division title convincingly to be promoted to the Reserve Division 1. After a restructuring of the Hellenic League they were allocated to Division 2 West which they won and were promoted to Division 1 West where they finished fourth in their first season. This team continues to provide a solid platform for younger players to develop and progress to the first team.

== Ground ==
The club has played at the Corinium Stadium since moving from the Smithfield ground in 2002. The ground has also been used by Gloucester City (2008–2010) and Wootton Bassett Town. It has a capacity of 4,500, of which 550 is seated and 1,250 covered.

== Honours ==
- Southern League
  - Division One South & West champions 2013–14
- Hellenic League
  - Premier Division champions 1995–96
  - Division One champions 1973–74
- Gloucestershire Northern Senior League
  - Champions 1966–67, 1967–68
- Cheltenham League
  - Division One champions 1927–28, 1929–30, 1948–49, 1954–55, 1955–56
  - Senior Charities Cup winners 1948–49, 1949–50, 1955–56
- Gloucestershire Senior Cup
  - Winners 1995–96, 2015–16

== Records ==
- Highest league position: 7th in the Southern League Premier Division, 2004–05
- Best FA Cup performance: Fourth qualifying round, 2001–02, 2003–04
- Best FA Trophy performance: Third round, 2002–03
- Best FA Vase performance: Third round: 1975–76, 1976–77
- Record attendance: 2,600 vs Fareham Town, 1969
- Record transfer fee paid: £4,000 to Gloucester City for Lee Smith

== See also ==
- Cirencester Town F.C. players
- Cirencester Town F.C. managers
