= Arsenal F.C. Under-21s and Academy =

English association football youth system

Arsenal Under-21s and Academy
- Full name: Arsenal Football Club (Under-21s and Academy)
- Nicknames: Hale End; The Young Gunners
- Founded: 1887; 139 years ago
- Ground: Meadow Park
- Capacity: 4,502
- Academy director: Pascal De Maesschalck
- Head coach: David Horseman (U21)
- League: Professional Development League (Division 1)
Home colours	Away colours	Third colours

Arsenal Football Club Academy, also known as Hale End, is the youth system of Arsenal Football Club based in Hale End, London, England. The academy teams play in the Professional Development League, the highest level of youth football in England. The club also competes in the FA Youth Cup and UEFA Youth League competitions. Former player Per Mertesacker served as the academy manager between 2018 and 2026.

Arsenal Under-21s, previously referred to as the Reserves, is the highest level squad within the setup. They train at the Arsenal Training Centre and play the majority of their home games at Meadow Park, which is the home of Boreham Wood FC. On occasion they also play at Arsenal's Emirates Stadium. Senior players occasionally play in the reserve side, as in the case when they are recovering from injury.

Arsenal's Academy is one of England's most successful, winning seven FA Youth Cups together with six Premier Academy League titles altogether. Numerous international players have graduated from the academy and reserve teams.

== History ==
=== Under-21 team (previously reserve team) ===
==== Early years (1887–1919) ====
Since Arsenal were based in Plumstead as Royal Arsenal F.C., they had a reserve side which was at first set up in 1887. The club initially played friendlies and cup competitions, winning the 1889–90 Kent Junior Cup. In 1895–96, the club which was renamed Woolwich Arsenal in 1891, had their reserves join the Kent League, winning the title the next season but leaving circa 1900. They later joined the London League where they won three titles during the 1900s.

From 1900–01 to 1902–03, the reserves played in the West Kent League, winning the league title in every season they featured within such. As they were at a level higher than their local opponents, in 1903 the team moved to South Eastern League, playing there until 1914–15 when football was suspended due to the First World War. Concurrent to this period, the reserves also entered in the London League First Division in the 1906–07, 1907–08, 1908–09, 1913–14 and 1914–15 seasons. The club went on to omit the "Woolwich" from their title in 1913, so as to be known only as "Arsenal".

==== The Football Combination (1919–1939) ====
Following the end of World War I in 1918, Arsenal Reserves took the first team's place in the London Combination league which was renamed the Football Combination in the summer of 1939. For the 1926–27 season, the competition was expanded to include teams as far afield as Portsmouth, Swansea, Southend and Leicester. During the inter-war period Arsenal's reserves matched the first team's success, winning the League South A title of 1940 and 1943 as well as being the London league champions of 1942. Additionally, from 1931 onwards the club's reserves were entered into the London Challenge Cup, winning it twice in 1933–34 and as well in 1935–36.

To give opportunities to younger players, Arsenal created an 'A' team in 1929. Initially the 'A' team entered the London Professional Mid-Week League and were champions in 1931–32. They then competed in the league until the 1933–34 footballing season. Wherein, during the summer of 1934, Arsenal had taken on Kent side Margate as their nursery team. Arsenal had agreed to send promising youngsters to Margate to give them experience in the Southern Football League and were given first choice on any Margate players. The two clubs thus enjoyed being within this relationship which had lasted for four years before Arsenal broke it off in 1938. Afterwards, Arsenal entered the reserve team in the Southern League in its own right with home games being played at Enfield F.C.'s stadium at Southbury Road. The club eventually finished in 6th place in the league season of 1938–39.

At the start of the 1939–40 season the reserves played two Football Combination games and one Southern League game before football was partly suspended due to the outbreak of the Second World War.

==== The Football Combination (1945–1999) ====
For the 1946–47 season, the Football Combination resumed but the league was split into two divisions with the winners of each division playing in a final to decide the champions. A new competition was introduced – the Football Combination Cup. This was the same teams that played in the Football Combination but divided into 4 groups with the winners of each group playing in semi-finals and a final. This format continued until the end of the 1954–55 season. From 1955–56 the Football Combination continued generally as a normal league format, occasionally consisting of two divisions with promotion and relegation. The Football Combination Cup was discontinued but re-instated for seasons 1965–66 to 1969–70 inclusive and 1996–97. The reserves continued to be entered in the London FA Challenge Cup until the 1973–74 season, with the exception of 1961–62 when the first team were entered.

The 'A' team was resurrected at the start of the 1948–49 season when a team was entered in the Eastern Counties League, Eastern Counties League Cup and East Anglian Cup, winning the Eastern Counties League in 1954–55, after which they left the league (stating that it was so strong that they needed to enter a more competitive team, which would be more expensive), but continued to play in the East Anglian Cup for the next two seasons. In addition, the 'A' team was also entered in the London Professional Mid-Week League from 1949–50 to 1957–58, winning a second time in 1952–53. During the summer of 1958, the 'A' team was entered into the Metropolitan League, Metropolitan League Cup and Metropolitan League Professional Cup. This proved a very successful venture until the mid-1960s. Towards the end of the 1960s, the 'A' team struggled against strong amateur teams and the club declined to enter a team after the close of the 1968–69 season.

==== 1999–present ====
In 1999 they left the Combination to become founding members of the Premier Reserve League. They never won the competition, although they did finish as runners-up in the 2001–02 and 2010–11 seasons. At the end of the 2011–12 season they finished 3rd in Reserve League South, in what would be the competition's final season. Players from the reserve team have also been used extensively in the League Cup since the 1997–98 season. At the beginning of the 2012–13 season Arsenal's reserve and academy structure received a major overhaul. The reserve team left the Premier Reserve League and joined the Professional Development League for the competition's inaugural season. Fundamentally, replacing the reserves with an Under-21 team that has the allowance of three over-age outfield players and one goalkeeper per match day.

At the beginning of the 2014–15 season Arsenal's academy coaching structure received a major change with Andries Jonker being appointed as head of academy on 1 July 2014, along with several key changes with in key coaching roles throughout the academy. In his time in charge of the academy, he instigated many changes, such as changes to the way the players were educated within the club, therefore helping them spend more time on site with their fellow players. He was also a key part in the new Hale End facility being built, with three pitches for the academy teams to make use of. In 2016 with the rebranding of the Premier League the reserve team continued to play in the Professional Development League, but it would now be named the Premier League 2. On 27 February 2017, it was announced the Andries Jonker would leave his role as head of academy to join VfL Wolfsburg as head coach, alongside former Arsenal player Freddie Ljungberg as assistant coach.

=== Academy (previously Youth) ===
==== Arsenal Youth (1954–1998) ====
Arsenal have occasionally operated a youth team as far back as 1893–94, and there had been an established third team known as Arsenal 'A' for young players from 1929 to 1969.

The club have played in the FA Youth Cup since the 1954–55 season and then entered into the South East Counties Youth Football League simultaneously. The following season the league competition was renamed as the South East Counties League. Arsenal also featured from 1955 into another tournament known as the South East Counties League Cup wherein they stayed within while excluding the 1968 and 1969 seasons to the 1997–98 English footballing season. Arsenal's Academy altogether was victorious in the Counties League in 1956, 1965, 1972 and 1991. Arsenal's youths also played in the London Minor FA Challenge Cup from 1955 to 1956. In 1960 they rejoined the competition where they stayed until 1967 and was also successful in the Southern Junior Floodlit Cup which they won in 1956, 1972, 1975 and 1999.

Arsenal thus became, of youth teams in the country, the winners of seven South East Counties League titles and six South East Counties League Cups of which included three "doubles".

==== Arsenal Academy (1998–present) ====
The youth team became founder members of the FA Premier Youth League in 1997–98. The league was initially a single division and Arsenal won the inaugural title. The following season this was renamed the Premier Academy League and split into Under-19 and Under-17 sections, with the new FA Academy system formally changing Arsenal's youth team to Academy status. Arsenal entered teams in both sections, winning the U17 title in 1999–00 and the U19 title in 2001–02 as well as two more FA Youth Cups in 2000 and 2001.

Since 2004–05, the FA Premier Academy League has consisted of only a single section for Under-18s, although an Under-16 section is played with no league table being recorded. Arsenal U18s have won their division group (Group A) three times, in 2007–08, 2008–09 and 2009–10. They went on to win the academy play-off semi-final and final in 2008–09 and 2009–10 to become Premier Academy League champions. In 2009 they completed their first double by also winning the 2008–09 FA Youth Cup, having beaten Liverpool 6–2 on aggregate in the final.

Arsenal got to fourth place of the NextGen Series in 2013 and got to the quarterfinals of the newly created UEFA Youth League in 2014. In 2016, Arsenal's U21s won the semifinal of the Professional Development League's Division 2 playoffs 2–1 against Blackburn Rovers. In the final Arsenal beat Aston Villa by 3 goals to 1 at the Emirates Stadium so as to become playoff champions.

In April 2017, Arsenal's Under 13 team defeated Sunderland to lift the inaugural Premier League National Cup as champions. As well, in June 2017, Arsenal's Under-14s won the 2016-17 Premier League Albert Phelan Cup. On 7 July 2017, it was announced that Per Mertesacker, who retired from football at the end of the 2017–18 season, would take up the role of Arsenal Academy's manager thereafter.

== Current squad ==
=== Under-21s ===
Note: Flags indicate national team as defined under FIFA eligibility rules; some limited exceptions apply. Players may hold more than one non-FIFA nationality.

No.	Pos.	Nation	Player
37	MF	NED	Demiane Agustien
38	DF	WAL	Brayden Clarke
40	DF	ENG	Jaden Dixon
43	FW	ENG	Andre Harriman-Annous
44	MF	ENG	Ife Ibrahim
45	MF	ENG	Theo Julienne
47	MF	ENG	Louie Copley
48	GK	DEN	Lucas Martin Nygaard
50	GK	ENG	Remy Mitchell
51	FW	SCO	Evan Mooney

No.	Pos.	Nation	Player
52	DF	ENG	Josh Ogunnaike
53	FW	NIR	Ceadach O'Neill
55	GK	ENG	Jack Porter
57	DF	ENG	Elijah Upson
59	FW	ENG	Archie Stevens
60	DF	ENG	Marcell Washington
61	FW	SRB	Louis Zečević-John
62	DF	ENG	Habeeb Ogunneye
63	FW	GIB	James Scanlon
64	FW	ENG	Igor Tyjon

==== Out on loan ====
Note: Flags indicate national team as defined under FIFA eligibility rules; some limited exceptions apply. Players may hold more than one non-FIFA nationality.

No.	Pos.	Nation	Player
42	GK	ENG	Khari Ranson (on loan to Billericay Town until 8 Dec 2026)
46	FW	NED	Ismeal Kabia (on loan to St Mirren until 30 June 2027)
58	FW	ENG	Charles Sagoe Jr (on loan to Kalmar until 31 December 2026)

==== Signed a pre-contract ====
Note: Flags indicate national team as defined under FIFA eligibility rules; some limited exceptions apply. Players may hold more than one non-FIFA nationality.

No.	Pos.	Nation	Player
—	FW	GEO	Andria Bartishvili (joining July 2027)
—	MF	IRL	Victor Ozhianvuna (joining January 2027)
—	FW	ECU	Edwin Quintero (joining August 2027)
—	MF	ECU	Holger Quintero (joining August 2027)

=== Under-18s ===
These players can also play with the Under-21s and the senior squad.

==== Second-year scholars ====
Note: Flags indicate national team as defined under FIFA eligibility rules; some limited exceptions apply. Players may hold more than one non-FIFA nationality.

No.	Pos.	Nation	Player
70	FW	ESP	Gabriel Arteta
71	FW	ENG	Brando Bailey-Joseph
72	FW	ENG	Marley Frohock
73	DF	SCO	Callan Hamill
74	MF	ENG	Maalik Hashi
75	DF	ENG	Josiah King
76	GK	POL	Remi Łupiński
77	MF	ENG	Teshaun Murisa

No.	Pos.	Nation	Player
78	DF	ENG	Abraham Owusu-Gyasi
79	MF	ENG	Bowen Phillips
81	MF	ENG	Saurap Sampang
82	DF	POL	Patrick Stachow
83	DF	ENG	Joshua Tahou
84	GK	ENG	Jack Talbot
89	DF	ENG	Marli Salmon

==== First-year scholars ====
Note: Flags indicate national team as defined under FIFA eligibility rules; some limited exceptions apply. Players may hold more than one non-FIFA nationality.

No.	Pos.	Nation	Player
56	FW	ENG	Max Dowman
65	FW	ENG	Mylo Bernard
66	FW	ENG	Vincent Joseph
80	MF	WAL	Axel Donczew
85	DF	ENG	Hakeem Abubakar
87	DF	ENG	Elyon Mbala
88	DF	NIR	Daniel McCarron

No.	Pos.	Nation	Player
90	FW	ENG	Emerson Nwaneri
91	FW	ENG	Jayden Oba
92	MF	ENG	Theo Odaji-Ukueku
93	DF	ENG	Angelinou Pedro
94	MF	ENG	Charlie Purdy
95	FW	ENG	Joshua Sesay

==== Schoolboys (U15/16s) ====
Note: Flags indicate national team as defined under FIFA eligibility rules; some limited exceptions apply. Players may hold more than one non-FIFA nationality.

No.	Pos.	Nation	Player
86	DF	ENG	Zach van der Straaten
96	FW	ENG	Jaden Maghoma
98	FW	ENG	Luis Muñoz
99	GK	ENG	Charlie Phillips
—	DF	ENG	Israel Aduba
—	MF	NGR	Emmanuel Ahaneku
—	FW	ENG	Leo Aliadiere
—	MF	ROU	Robert Asavetei
—	DF	NGR	Onye Asiegbu
—	GK	NIR	Phoenix Blayney
—	MF	CMR	Mikael Bonaventure-Yetna
—	DF	ENG	Travis Chilard-Martin
—	DF	ENG	Keyaan Davison
—	MF	ENG	Blake Day-King
—	GK	ENG	Rafe Dowling
—	DF	ENG	Jax Egbuson

No.	Pos.	Nation	Player
—	FW	GAM	Bubacarr Jallow
—	FW	ENG	Kayden Joseph
—	MF	NGR	Noah Laditan
—	GK	ITA	Max Lo Presti
—	DF	ENG	Beau Luton
—	FW	SCO	Fletcher McBryde
—	DF	ENG	Nasrat Ghulam Nabi
—	FW	ENG	Jake Obiora
—	DF	ENG	Ezra Okafor
—	FW	ENG	Kyron Raymond-Callender
—	DF	ENG	Hudson Sando
—	FW	ENG	Reiss Tweneboa-Kudoa
—	DF	UGA	Isaiah Swaibu-Matthews
—	GK	ENG	Kendrick van Djoy
—	DF	ENG	Frankie Wyatt

== Current staff ==
Head Coaches:

(Belgium) Pascal De Maesschalck	Academy Director
(England) Luke Hobbs	Head of Coaching
(England) David Horseman	U21 Head Coach
(Wales) Adam Birchall	U18 Head Coach
(England) Adam Pilling	U17 Head Coach
(Jamaica) Michael Donaldson	U16 Head Coach
(England) Craig Smith	U15 Head Coach
(England) Simon Copley	U14 Head Coach
	U13 Head Coach
(England) Kieron Lewis	U12 Head Coach
(England) Lewis Goater	U11 Head Coach
(England) Jhovan Bruce de Rouche	U10 Head Coach
(England) Jack Kennedy	U9 Head Coach

Other Key Staff:

(England) Will Oldham	Head of Operations
(England) Perry Stewart	Head of Performance
(England) Jordan McCann	Technical Lead Coach
(Barbados) Matt Joseph	Coach Developer
(Republic of Ireland) Ken Gillard	Professional Development Phase Lead Coach
(England) Reece Ottley	Head of Goalkeeping
(England) Lee Herron	Head of Recruitment
(England) Steve Brown	Lead Talent ID Coordinator
(England) Chris Perkins	Head of UK Emerging Talent
(England) Conan Watson	Emerging Talents Network Lead
(England) George Buckley	Lead Football Analyst

== Managerial History ==
=== Academy Managers ===
since being granted Academy status

- (Republic of Ireland) Liam Brady (1996–2014)
- (Netherlands) Andries Jonker (2014–2017)
- (England) Luke Hobbs (interim) (2017–2018)
- (Germany) Per Mertesacker (2018–2026)
- (Belgium) Pascal De Maesschalck (as Academy Director) (2026— )

=== Reserve and U21 team managerial history ===
- (England) Joe Shaw (1928–1945)
- (England) Don Howe (1966–1968)
- (England) Brian Whitehouse (1969-1971)
- (England) Steve Burtenshaw (1972-73)
- (England) Terry Burton (1979–1983)
- (England) Tommy Coleman (1983–1986)
- (England) Terry Burton (1986–1987)
- (Scotland) Stewart Houston (1987–1990)
- (England) George Armstrong (1990–2000)
- (Wales) Eddie Niedzwiecki (2000–2004)
- (England) Neil Banfield (2004–2012)
- (England) Terry Burton (2012–2013)
- (England) Steve Gatting (2013–2018)
- (Sweden) Freddie Ljungberg (2018–2019)
- (England) Steve Bould (2019–2021)
- (Seychelles) Kevin Betsy (2021–2022)
- (Turkey) Mehmet Ali (2022–2025)
- (England) Max Porter (2025–2026)

== Honours ==
Reserves

- Football & London Combination: 18

1922–23, 1926–27, 1927–28, 1928–29, 1929–30, 1930–31, 1933–34, 1934–35, 1936–37, 1937–38, 1938–39, 1946–47, 1950–51, 1962–63, 1968–69, 1969–70, 1983–84, 1989–90

- Football Combination Cup: 3

1952–53, 1967–68, 1969–70

- London FA Challenge Cup: 7

1933–34, 1935–36, 1953–54, 1954–55, 1957–58, 1962–63, 1969–70

- Kent League: 1

1896–97

- West Kent League: 3

1900–01, 1901–02, 1902–03

- London League First Division: 3

1901–02, 1903–04, 1906–07

- Kent Junior Cup: 1

1889–90

- London Professional Mid-Week League: 2

1931–32, 1952–53

- Eastern Counties League: 1

1954–55

- Metropolitan League: 3

1958–59, 1960–61, 1962–63

- Metropolitan League Cup: 2

1960–61, 1965–66

- Metropolitan League Professional Cup: 2

1960–61, 1961–62

Academy

- Professional Development League & Premier Academy League: 6 (record)

1997–98 (U18), 1999–00 (U17), 2001–02 (U19), 2008–09 (U18), 2009–10 (U18), 2015–16 (Play-Off Winners) (U21)

- FA Youth Cup: 7

1965–66, 1970–71, 1987–88, 1993–94, 1999–00, 2000–01, 2008–09

- Premier League National Cup: 1

2016–17

- South East Counties League: 4

1955–56, 1964–65, 1971–72, 1990–91

- South East Counties League Cup: 6

1959–60, 1960–61, 1961–62, 1963–64, 1970–71, 1979–80

- Southern Junior Floodlit Cup: 5

1962–63, 1965–66, 1984–85, 1990–91, 1997–98

- London Minor FA Cup: 1

1966–67

- NextGen Series: 2012–13 Fourth place

== Academy graduates ==
This is a list of former Arsenal F.C. academy or Arsenal 'A' graduates who have gone on to represent their country at full international level since the Second World War. Players who are still at Arsenal, or play at another club on loan from Arsenal, are highlighted in bold.

Left Academy before 1980

- (England) Leslie Compton
- (England) Charlie George
- (England) Ray Kennedy
- (England) Arthur Milton
- (England) John Radford
- (England) Graham Rix
- (England) Len Shackleton
- (England) Lionel Smith
- (England) Peter Storey
- (Northern Ireland) Terry Neill
- (Northern Ireland) Sammy Nelson
- (Northern Ireland) Pat Rice
- (Republic of Ireland) Liam Brady
- (Republic of Ireland) John Devine
- (Republic of Ireland) David O'Leary
- (Republic of Ireland) Frank O'Neill
- (Republic of Ireland) Frank Stapleton
- (Scotland) Alex Forsyth
- (Wales) Ray Daniel
- (Wales) Mal Griffiths
- (Wales) Jack Kelsey
- (Wales) Tom Walley

Left Academy between 1980 and 1989

- (Cyprus) Nikodimos Papavasiliou
- (England) Tony Adams
- (England) Kevin Campbell
- (England) Andy Cole
- (England) Martin Keown
- (England) Paul Merson
- (England) David Rocastle
- (England) Michael Thomas
- (Northern Ireland) Colin Hill
- (Northern Ireland) Steve Morrow
- (Republic of Ireland) Niall Quinn
- (Wales) Andy Marriott

Left Academy between 1990 and 1999

- (Barbados) Matt Joseph
- (England) Ashley Cole
- (England) Ian Selley
- (England) Ray Parlour
- (England) Jermaine Pennant
- (England) Steve Sidwell
- (Iceland) Stefán Gíslason
- (Iceland) Valur Gíslason
- (Jamaica) Narada Bernard
- (Republic of Ireland) Graham Barrett
- (Republic of Ireland) Pat Scully
- (Scotland) Paul Dickov
- (Scotland) Richard Hughes
- (Wales) Rhys Weston

Left Academy between 2000 and 2009

- (Antigua and Barbuda) Anton Blackwood
- (Australia) Neil Kilkenny
- (Cyprus) Georgios Efrem
- (Cyprus) Valentinos Sielis
- (Democratic Republic of the Congo) Peggy Lokando
- (Denmark) Nicklas Bendtner
- (England) David Bentley
- (England) Jay Bothroyd
- (England) Kieran Gibbs
- (England) Harry Kane
- (England) Jack Wilshere
- (Faroe Islands) Ingi Højsted
- (Ghana) Quincy Owusu-Abeyie
- (Guyana) Keanu Marsh-Brown
- (Mexico) Carlos Vela
- (Northern Ireland) Dean Shiels
- (Norway) Håvard Nordtveit
- (Poland) Wojciech Szczęsny
- (Republic of Ireland) Keith Fahey
- (Republic of Ireland) Anthony Stokes
- (Senegal) Armand Traoré
- (Sierra Leone) Albert Jarrett
- (Spain) Cesc Fàbregas
- (Sweden) Sebastian Larsson
- (Switzerland) Johan Djourou
- (Togo) Gilles Sunu
- (Trinidad and Tobago) Gavin Hoyte
- (Trinidad and Tobago) Justin Hoyte
- (Turkey) Colin Kazim-Richards
- (United States) Frank Simek
- (Wales) James Lawrence
- (Wales) Hal Robson-Kanu

Left Academy between 2010 and 2019

- (Algeria) Ismaël Bennacer
- (Argentina) Emiliano Martínez
- (Bolivia) Samuel Galindo
- (Cape Verde) Kristopher Da Graca
- (China) Nico Yennaris
- (Colombia) Ian Poveda
- (Cyprus) Kostas Pileas
- (Democratic Republic of the Congo) Benik Afobe
- (England) **Eberechi Eze**
- (England) Ainsley Maitland-Niles
- (England) Eddie Nketiah
- (England) **Bukayo Saka**
- (England) Emile Smith Rowe
- (Finland) Glen Kamara
- (Germany) Serge Gnabry
- (Ghana) Emmanuel Frimpong
- (Grenada) Regan Charles-Cook
- (Grenada) Reice Charles-Cook
- (Guyana) Anthony Jeffrey
- (Guyana) Bayli Spencer-Adams
- (Haiti) Yassin Fortuné
- (Jamaica) Isaac Hayden
- (Kosovo) Alban Bunjaku
- (Montserrat) Jernade Meade
- (Netherlands) Donyell Malen
- (Nigeria) Semi Ajayi
- (Nigeria) Alex Iwobi
- (Nigeria) Kelechi Nwakali
- (Nigeria) Nathan Tella
- (Northern Ireland) Daniel Ballard
- (North Macedonia) Dejan Iliev
- (Poland) Krystian Bielik
- (Romania) Vlad Dragomir
- (Rwanda) Alfred Mugabo
- (Spain) Héctor Bellerín
- (Sweden) Kristoffer Olsson
- (Turkey) Oğuzhan Özyakup
- (United States) Yunus Musah

Left Academy between 2020 and 2029

- (Albania) Maldini Kacurri
- (Canada) Marcelo Flores
- (Denmark) Mika Biereth
- (England) **Myles Lewis-Skelly**
- (Estonia) Karl Hein
- (Jamaica) Omari Hutchinson
- (Nigeria) Ryan Alebiosu
- (Nigeria) Arthur Okonkwo
- (Northern Ireland) **Ceadach O'Neill**
- (Republic of Ireland) Mark McGuinness
- (Romania) Cătălin Cîrjan
- (Tunisia) Omar Rekik
- (United States) Folarin Balogun
