= List of German fashion designers =

This is a List of German fashion designers.

== A ==
- Torsten Amft
- Iris von Arnim

== B ==
- Barbara Becker
- Gunda Beeg
- Maria Bogner
- Willy Bogner Jr.
- Willy Bogner Sr.
- Hugo Boss

== C ==
- Gregor Clemens

== E ==
- Barbara Engel
- Susanne Erichsen
- Escada

== F ==
- Prince Egon von Fürstenberg

== G ==
- Robert Geller
- Eva Gronbach

== H ==
- Otto Ludwig Haas-Heye
- Uli Herzner
- Mafalda von Hessen
- Claudia Hill
- Wolfgang Joop

== K ==
- Heidi Klum
- Guido Maria Kretschmer

== L ==
- Karl Lagerfeld
- Frank Leder
- Sonja de Lennart
- Philippa Lindenthal
- Gina-Lisa Lohfink
- Papis Loveday
- Otto Lucas

== M ==
- Tomas Maier
- Michael Michalsky
- Rudolph Moshammer
- Anna Muthesius

== O ==
- Heinz Oestergaard

== P ==
- Philipp Plein

== R ==
- Christian Roth

== S ==
- Boris Bidjan Saberi
- Donaldson Sackey
- Jil Sander
- Alex Stenzel

== T ==
- Thea Tewi

== W ==
- John Weitz
- Bernhard Willhelm
- Tilmann Wröbel
- Noah Wunsch
- Gerhard Weber
