= Saberi =

Saberi (Persian: صابری) is a Persian surname. Notable people with the surname include:

- Ali Saberi (born 1973), Iranian lawyer and disability rights activist
- Boris Bidjan Saberi (born 1978), menswear designer based in Barcelona
- Kioumars Saberi Foumani (1941–2004), Iranian satirist, writer, and teacher
- Pari Saberi (born 1932), Iranian drama and theatre director
- Roxana Saberi, (born 1977) American freelance journalist and pageant winner
