= Phil America =

American artist

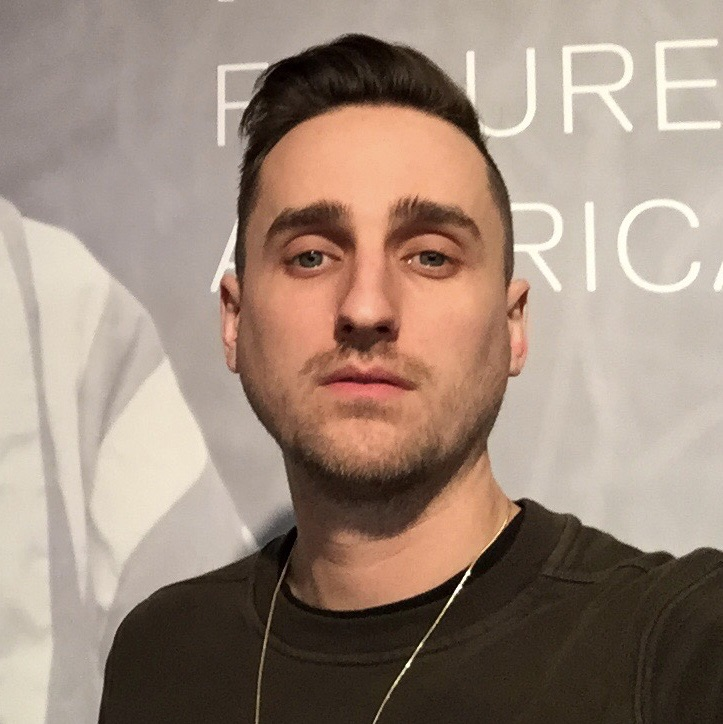
- Known for: Conceptual artworks
- Movement: Contemporary art

Phil America is an American artist who creates conceptual artworks mixed with design and photography.

His work has been shown in solo and group exhibitions in the US, Bangkok, Seoul and other cities around the world. He has created temporary installations at an abandoned platform beneath a New York City subway station, and on the Mexico–United States barrier as well as other works in public space.

== Work ==
Dating back to his roots in graffiti, America has created art in public space as well as documenting it in his books. In 2013 he created a fabricated living quarters in a suburb in Bangkok, later showing it in a local museum. He later created what he calls "illegal galleries" in a number of places, including on the Mexico–United States barrier, in an abandoned New York City Metropolitan Transportation Authority station and at a Los Angeles swap meet.

In 2014 America spoke at a TEDx conference on the language of art and the importance of using art to make positive social changes in the world, amongst other topics.

In 2016 he lived in a museum as a part of one of his installations that was first installed illegally in a tent city in San Jose where he lived for one month.

Also in 2016 his work was unveiled as one of the permanent art installations at Golden 1 Center, the Sacramento Kings' new arena. The work consists of hundreds of cut-up player worn basketball shoes and forms a large Kings logo.

In 2018, America collaborated with fashion designer Boris Bidjan Saberi on their Spring / Summer 2018 collection.

== Exhibitions ==
=== Installations ===
- 2016: Player Edition, Golden 1 Center (Sacramento Kings NBA arena), Sacramento, USA
- 2016: Abandoned platform beneath Nevins Street station, Metropolitan Transportation Authority, New York City
- 2017: Bright Stars, Mexico–United States barrier

=== Solo exhibition ===
- 2016: Failure of the American Dream, Contemporary Art Museum of Raleigh, Raleigh, USA
- 2016: Design of Memories, Dongdaemun Design Plaza, Seoul, South Korea
- 2013: Above The Law, Montana Gallery, Lisbon, Portugal

=== Group exhibitions ===
- 2014: Journey of Voices, Bangkok Art and Culture Centre, Bangkok, Thailand
- 2017: Drinkin, Smokin', & West Coastin', Think Tank Gallery, Los Angeles, USA
- 2017: Contemporary Landscape, CICA Museum (Czong Institute for Contemporary Art), Seoul, South Korea
