= Forest Green Rovers F.C. =

Association football club in Nailsworth, England

Forest Green Rovers
- Full name: Forest Green Rovers Football Club
- Nicknames: The Green; Green Army; Black and White Army
- Short name: Rovers; Forest Green; FGR
- Founded: 25 October 1889; 137 years ago
- Ground: The New Lawn
- Capacity: 5,147 (2,000 seated)
- Owner: Dale Vince
- Manager: Jonathan Gould (caretaker)
- League: National League
- 2025–26: National League, 7th of 24
- Website: www.fgr.co.uk
Home colours	Away colours

Forest Green Rovers Football Club is a professional association football club based in Nailsworth, Gloucestershire, England. The team competes in the National League, the fifth level of the English football league system.

Formed in October 1889, the club became founder members of the Mid Gloucestershire League five years later. Competing in various local league competitions for much of the 20th century, they won a multitude of league titles: the Dursley and District League (1902–03), the Stroud and District Football League (1911–12 and 1920–21), the Stroud Premier League (1934–35, 1935–36 and 1936–37), the North Gloucestershire League (1920–21 and 1921–22), and the Gloucestershire Northern Senior League (1937–38, 1949–50 and 1950–51). They became founder members of the Gloucestershire County League in 1968, before they were moved up to the Premier Division of the Hellenic League seven years later.

Forest Green won the Hellenic League in the 1981–82 season and lifted the FA Vase after beating Rainworth Miners Welfare in the final at Wembley. They spent the next 13 years in the Midland Division of the Southern League, and briefly competed under the name Stroud F.C. Reverting to the name Forest Green Rovers, the club won successive Southern League Southern Division and Premier Division titles in 1996–97 and 1997–98, winning promotion into the Conference. Reaching the 1999 FA Trophy final, which they lost, they became the first club to reach the finals of both the FA Vase and FA Trophy. They also reached the 2001 FA Trophy final, which again they lost. Twice reprieved from relegation from the Conference National due to the demotion of other clubs, the club was transformed following investment from green energy industrialist Dale Vince in 2010.

Under Vince's chairmanship Forest Green became the world's first vegan football club in 2015, and the New Lawn was installed with numerous eco-friendly innovations. Investment in the playing squad saw the club compete for promotion into the English Football League, which they achieved with victory in the 2017 National League play-offs, having been beaten in the semi-finals in 2015 and in the 2016 final. Forest Green were then promoted to League One in 2022 for the first time in their history, following an EFL League Two title win. They were relegated after one season, and suffered a successive relegation back to non-League in the following year, ending their seven-year spell in the Football League. They have played their home games at The New Lawn since 2006, when they moved from their original home at The Lawn Ground.

== History ==
=== Local and county leagues ===
The club was established in 1889 by E. J. H. Peach, representing the Forest Green area of Nailsworth. The name Rovers was adopted in 1893, and the following year the club were founder member of the Mid-Gloucestershire League. Their first home league match on 6 October was a 1–1 draw with Brimscombe, and the club went on to finish the 1894–95 season in third place. Nailsworth had become an urban district in 1894 and there was an effort to ensure the town was represented by a football team. As a result, the club was renamed Nailsworth Association Football Club and many members of the original team were replaced by players from Nailsworth, although they continued to play at the original Lawn Ground in Forest Green. However, the club withdrew from the league during the 1896–97 season.

The club was re-established in 1898 under the Forest Green Rovers name, and absorbed Nailsworth Thursday shortly afterwards. They joined both Division One of the Mid-Gloucestershire League and also the Dursley and District League for the 1899–1900 season. The Mid-Gloucestershire League folded in 1901, with Forest Green left playing in the Dursley and District League. In 1902–03, they joined the new Stroud and District League, also continuing in the Dursley and District League. In the Stroud and District League, they finished as runners-up to Brimscombe, whilst in the Dursley and District League they finished joint top of the table with Stonehouse after being awarded the points from an unplayed match against Chalford. As a result, a play-off match was held to decide the championship, with over 1,000 spectators watching Forest Green win 2–1 in extra time. In 1906–07, they finished bottom of the Stroud and District League with zero points (although they had won one game, they had two points deducted for fielding an ineligible player). They withdrew from the Dursley and District League in 1908.

In 1911 Forest Green merged with Nailsworth to form Nailsworth and Forest Green United, continuing to play at the Lawn Ground and in the Stroud and District League; the new club won the league, losing only one match all season. They entered a team into the Dursley and District League in 1912–13, but withdrew from the Stroud and District League after only four matches. After World War I the club rejoined the league and the 1919–20 season saw them finish joint top of the table with Chalford and Stonehouse. The league subsequently held a draw to decide the championship, with Forest Green drawn against Stonehouse in a semi-final, with the winner to play Chalford for the title. However, Stonehouse beat Forest Green 3–2 in the semi-final match. In 1920 the club also entered a team into the North Gloucestershire League and went on to win both leagues, as well as the Northern Junior Cup. They repeated the double league championship the following season. They were founder members of the Gloucestershire Northern Senior League in 1922, but left the league at the end of the 1922–23 season to return to the Stroud and District League.

Forest Green finished as runners-up in 1924–25 and 1925–26, before rejoining the Gloucestershire Northern Senior League in 1926. They went on to finish as runners-up in 1926–27 before leaving the league again to play in the new Stroud Premier League. After finishing fourth in the league, the club returned to the Northern Senior League at the end of the season, although they also kept a team in the Stroud Premier League. The club withdrew from the Stroud Premier League in 1930, the league for a third time in 1934, rejoining the Stroud Premier League. They were Stroud Premier League champions for three successive seasons in 1934–35, 1935–36 and 1936–37, before re-entering the Northern Senior League in 1937. They went on to win the league title in 1937–38. After finishing as runners-up in 1948–49, they won successive league titles in 1949–50 and 1950–51. Although the club finished as runners-up in 1952–53, they were relegated to Division Two at the end of the 1954–55 season. However, they were Division Two champions the following season, and were promoted back to Division One. Forest Green were amongst the founders of the Gloucestershire County League in 1968, where they played until moving up to the Premier Division of the Hellenic League in 1975 under the management of Peter Goring.

=== Regional leagues ===
Forest Green's first season in the Hellenic League Premier Division saw them finish fourth. Although they then spent two seasons in lower mid-table, a third-place finish in 1978–79 was the start of a successful four years, culminating in the 1981–82 season, in which they won the Hellenic League and reached the final of the FA Vase. At Wembley they defeated Rainworth Miners Welfare 3–0 to win the trophy. At the end of the season the club were promoted to the Midland Division of the Southern League. Although they finished third in their first season in the new league, the next six seasons were spent in mid-table.

In 1989, the club was renamed Stroud Football Club. Another season in mid-table was followed by two in which they finished in the bottom five. They also participated in the Welsh Cup for four seasons, reaching the quarter finals in 1990–91 where they were defeated by the eventual runners-up Wrexham. After reverting to their original name, the club continued to struggle in the league until they were transferred to the Southern Division in 1995. After finishing eighth under Frank Gregan in 1995–96, they won the division the following season, earning promotion to the Premier Division of the Southern League. The 1997–98 season saw them win the Southern League Premier Division, securing a second successive promotion and entry to the Football Conference.

=== Conference League ===
Chart of FGR's final table positions in the league system since 1998-99.

In Forest Green's first season in the Conference, they finished twelfth, as well as reaching the final of the FA Trophy, becoming the first team to play in the final of both the FA Vase and the FA Trophy. However, they lost 1–0 to Kingstonian. The following season saw another first as the club reached the first round of the FA Cup for the first time; after beating Guiseley 6–0 in the first round, they lost 3–0 at home to Torquay United in the second. In November 2000 Gregan was replaced as manager by former England international Nigel Spink; the club reached the FA Trophy final again at the end of the season, losing 1–0 to Canvey Island.

In 2004–05 Forest Green finished in the relegation zone, but were reprieved after Northwich Victoria were demoted due to issues with their stadium. In 2007–08 the club defeated Football League opposition in the FA Cup for the first time, beating Rotherham United 3–0 in a first round replay, before losing 3–2 at Swindon Town. The following season saw them reach the third round of the Cup for the first time, beating Team Bath and then Rochdale to set a third round tie at home to Derby County which they lost 4–3 in front of a record crowd of 4,836. Another third round appearance in 2009–10 ended with a 2–1 defeat at Notts County.

The 2009–10 season saw Forest Green finish in the relegation zone, but another reprieve from relegation was won when Salisbury City were expelled for breaking financial rules. The club was then taken over by Ecotricity founder Dale Vince; Vince set out plans to make the club more eco-friendly, including removing red meat from players' diets, stopping selling meat products in the ground and treating the pitch with organic fertiliser.

Forest Green finished fifth in the Conference in 2014–15, qualifying for the promotion play-offs; they went on to lose 3–0 on aggregate to Bristol Rovers in the semi-finals. The following season saw them finish as runners-up in the renamed National League, their highest-ever league position; in the subsequent play-offs they defeated Dover Athletic 2–1 in the semi-finals, before losing 3–1 to Grimsby Town in the final at Wembley. A third consecutive play-off campaign was secured with a third-place finish in 2016–17. After beating Dagenham & Redbridge 3–1 in the semi-finals, the club defeated Tranmere Rovers by the same score line in the final at Wembley, earning promotion to League Two. This made Nailsworth the smallest town ever to host a Football League club and ended a 19 season long run in the National League without promotion, the longest consecutive period since promotion to the English Football League began.

=== Football League ===
==== League Two debut and play-off campaigns (2017–2021) ====
In their debut season within the English Football League (2017–18), the club narrowly avoided relegation, securing their status with two games to spare. The 2018–19 season saw them finish fifth in League Two, securing a play-off campaign. They went on to lose 2–1 to Tranmere Rovers in the play-off semi-finals.

In the 2020–21 season, the club sacked their then manager Mark Cooper after they had failed to secure a win in six matches; losing four consecutively. Jimmy Ball stepped in to lead the team until the end of the season. They finished sixth within the league, leading to another play-off campaign. This campaign saw them lose 5–4 on aggregate to Newport County.

==== League Two title and promotion (2021–22) ====
Following the 2020–21 campaign, the club hired Rob Edwards as their head coach in June of 2021, leaving his role as England U16 Head Coach and U20 Assistant for the FA. He was joined by Richie Kyle as assistant coach.

The club began the 2021–22 season with a strong start; winning seven of their opening ten league matches. This placed them top of the league, a position they would hold until round 42 of the competition. At one point, they were 14 points ahead of the team in second position. However following game week 42, Forest Green were caught and overtaken by Exeter City, who had climbed up the table after a club-record 11 successive home league wins between October and April. With just four games remaining, Exeter City were on 80 points, and Forest Green on 79.

Forest Green went on to win their next game against Oldham Athletic, then draw against Bristol Rovers. Not only did this secure an automatic promotion spot to League One, but also resulted in them being equal on points with Exeter City going into the last two games. At the time, Forest Green had a better goal difference by 13 goals.

In the penultimate game of the season, Forest Green lost 3–1 against Harrogate Town, while Exeter City drew 1–1 against Northampton Town. This resulted in Forest Green falling a point behind Exeter City, meaning that going into the final game, an Exeter City victory against Port Vale would win the league no matter the score in the Forest Green game against Mansfield Town. However, the opportunity to win the league on the final day was still present for Forest Green; provided Exeter City drew or lost, and Forest Green won or drew their match against Mansfield. A draw would only win them the league if Exeter lost (but not drew themselves also) due to Forest Green's superior goal difference.

Both games on the final day kicked-off at the same time, with Forest Green playing away at Mansfield Town, and Exeter City playing at home against Port Vale. At the end of the first half, Forest Green were losing 1–0 following a goal from Mansfield's Matthew Longstaff. In the Exeter City game, Port Vale were leading 1–0 following a goal from James Wilson. As things stood going into the second halves, Exeter were winning the league by one point, although a draw or win for Forest Green would win the league (assuming the result in the Exeter game remained the same). As the games progressed, Ebou Adams scored in the 64th minute in the Forest Green game to make it 1–1. Mansfield then restored their lead with a goal from Jordan Bowery in the 78th minute, making it 2–1 to the home side. Just two minutes later, Forest Green equalised again with a goal from Josh March. All the while, it was still 1–0 in the Exeter City game, meaning as it stood in the last twenty minutes of regular time, Forest Green would win the league on goal difference. As both games progressed to their end, neither result changed, crowning Forest Green as the League Two champions for the first and only time in their history, and also the first time they had ever been promoted to League One. Manager Rob Edwards said after the game that it was "surreal" and "incredible" to finish top of the league.

At the EFL awards of April 2022, Rob Edwards was named League Two Manager of the Season. Rovers' players Kane Wilson, Nicky Cadden, and Matty Stevens, were all also named in the "Football Manager Sky Bet League Two Team of the Season". In the 2022 PFA League Two Team of the Year, Forest Green had five players included, with Wilson, Cadden, and Stevens named again alongside Ebou Adams and Jamille Matt.

==== Consecutive Relegations (2022–2024) ====
After their success in 2021–22, manager Rob Edwards announced he was leaving the club and joining Watford. At the time, chairmen Vince was publicly unhappy, saying that negotiations between Edwards and Watford took place "behind our backs." He also said that "It takes a bit of the shine off winning promotion. If there's any karma in football they'll [Watford] languish in the Championship and we'll meet them there in a few years' time." To replace Edwards, Ian Burchnall was hired as head coach to lead the team into the 2022–23 season.

Having won just five of their opening twenty-eight league matches in the 2022–23 season, Burchnall was sacked as head coach and replaced by Duncan Ferguson. Despite this appointment, Rovers were relegated back to League Two after finishing in 24th position.

Before the 2023–24 season commenced, Duncan Ferguson left the club in July 2023, and was replaced by Hannah Dingley, who stepped in as caretaker coach. Dingley was the first woman to have taken charge of a men's professional football team.

Dingley was soon replaced by David Horseman, who led the team at the start of the 2023–24 season. He was sacked in December 2023, and replaced by Troy Deeney, who at the time was a player at the club. Deeney was also sacked just 29 days following his appointment after publicly criticising his players and not winning a match during his six game tenure. He was replaced by Steve Cotterill. At the end of the season, Rovers finished in the relegation zone again in League Two after finishing 24th, thus suffering the indignity of back-to-back relegations into the National League, ending their seven-year spell in the Football League.

=== National League ===
Returning to the National League for the 2024–25 season, Forest Green finished third in the table with 22 wins, 17 draws and seven defeats, managed by Steve Cotterill. This earned the club a home play-off fixture versus Southend United, which Southend won on penalties after the match was tied at 2–2 after extra time.

Cotterill left the club on 24 June 2025. On 1 July 2025, Robbie Savage was appointed first team manager, joining from Macclesfield.

In the 2025–26 season, Forest Green finished in seventh position with 81 points, earning them a play-off quarter-final match away against Boreham Wood. Forest Green lost 1–0 after extra time.

== Green credentials ==
In 2018 Forest Green Rovers became the first football club in the world to be certified carbon neutral under the United Nations Framework Convention on Climate Change (UNFCCC) initiative Climate Neutral Now.

The United Nations has recognised Forest Green Rovers as the world's first carbon-neutral football club and it was described by FIFA as the "greenest team in the world".

In September 2020, Spain and Arsenal fullback Héctor Bellerín became the second-largest shareholder in the club.

On 2 August 2021, Forest Green Rovers announced a new partnership with clean energy and electric vehicle YouTube channel, Fully Charged and named their pitch accordingly to The Fully Charged New Lawn.

In 2023, Forest Green Rovers were ranked first among all English Football League clubs for environmental sustainability by Sport Positive Leagues, achieving a high score across the organisation.

== Colours and crest ==
The previous club badge was very similar to the FC Barcelona badge. The flag of St. George appeared on both badges, showing his links to England as well as Catalonia. Rovers' home kit for many years was a black and white striped shirt with black shorts.

In May 2011, the club released a consultation for supporters inviting opinions on the club's decision to change its badge. The new badge was used from the beginning of the 2011–12 season.

On 2 July 2012, it was announced that the club would change its home strip from its traditional black and white stripes to a lime green shirt with black shorts and socks. The decision to move away from the traditional black and white stripes proved controversial with many supporters. The away strip was also changed to an all-white kit with the dates '1899–2012' near the neckline of the kit to indicate the years when the club first played in an all-white kit and the decision to bring it back in 2012.

In the summer of 2014 the home strip was changed to lime green and black stripes on the front, with a plain green back, green shorts and black and green striped socks in order to align with sponsor Ecotricity's marketing colours. On 19 August 2014, the new away strip was announced, which would be a modern version of the traditional home strip of black and white striped shirt, black shorts and red socks.

In 2021, the team became the first in the world to play in a football kit made from a composite material consisting of recycled plastic and coffee grounds.

== Rivalries ==
Gloucestershire rivals Shortwood are seen as the club's local neighbours within the non-league divisions. Cheltenham Town are seen as the club's main rivals. Fixtures between the two sides are humorously named El Glosico, a play-on-words of the famous El Clásico fixture.

In the non-League pyramid, the club maintains local rivalries with Gloucester City, and Bath City. Smaller rivalries also developed with Bristol Rovers, Newport County and Swindon Town during Forest Green's Football League years.

== Stadium ==
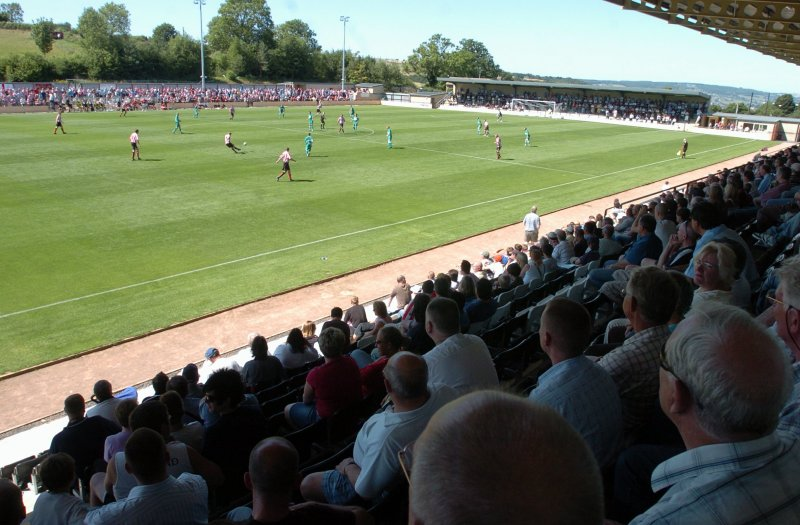
The New Lawn

The club initially played at a ground 'at the top of the hill' in Forest Green known as the Lawn Ground. They moved to a ground in Nailsworth in 1924, but returned to the Lawn in 1927 after it was upgraded with a boundary wall and entrance gates. At the start of the 2006–07 season the club moved to the New Lawn.

The Sustainability in Sport terrace is at the north end of the ground. This terrace was the location for away fans and had previously housed home supporters which it has reverted to. A decision by the club at the end of the 2012–13 season saw the areas in which home and away fans were housed at the ground switched with home fans reverting to the EESI Stand at the opposite end of the ground which was converted from seating to a standing terrace. Subsequently, away fans have been accommodated in the West side of the ground. The East Stand is the largest-capacity stand at the ground and is a seated stand that contains seven boxes, the 'Green Man' public house, gym, dance studio and conference and leisure facilities. The western side of the ground is an open terrace now the area for away fans with a small covered seating area. Although the stadium can hold 5,147 fans, the highest league attendance recorded at the venue so far was 3,781 in a Conference Premier fixture against Bristol Rovers. However, the highest all-time attendance was 4,836 for an FA Cup third round tie at home to Championship side Derby County. The usual attendance was between 1,000 and 1,800 for National League fixtures. In June 2011, the club began work on making the stadium environmentally friendly following the arrival of new owner and green energy entrepreneur Dale Vince. This included developing an entirely organic pitch. In December 2011, 180 solar panels were installed on the roof of the EESI stand, helping the club generate 10% of the electricity needed to run the stadium. In April 2012, Forest Green introduced the first robot lawn mower to be used by a British football club on to its playing surface. This followed a previous robot mower that had been in service at the club's former ground. The Etesia robot mower – known as a 'mow bot' – uses GPS technology to guide it round the pitch without the need for human intervention and gathers power from the solar panels at the stadium. In December 2012, the club beat 200 other nominees to first prize in the Institute of Groundsmanship awards in the sustainability and environmental category for its organic pitch and the environmental aspects at The New Lawn.

=== Eco Park ===
On 3 November 2016, the club announced the winning design for a proposed 5,000 seat new stadium to be built within the Eco Park complex beside Junction 13 of the M5 in Gloucestershire, 1.5 miles west of the town of Stonehouse (and 8.5 miles northwest of their spiritual home of Nailsworth). The design is for a stadium made almost entirely of wood, including the roof cantilevers. It will be able to be increased in size to 10,000 capacity depending on the club's success. The plans were initially rejected by the planning authorities in June 2019 but revised plans were approved later that year. The English Football League gave their consent to the stadium in February 2021. It is intended that the new stadium will have the lowest carbon footprint of any stadium in the world. Vince hoped that the club would be able to play games at the stadium within "three or four years".

== Club mascot: "Neville, The Green Devil" ==
The club has one mascot named "Neville the Green Devil". He is a large, green devil who wears the full FGR kit. He can regularly be seen within the stadium during matches meeting fans and taking photos alongside them.

== Current squad ==
As of 20 November 2026

Note: Flags indicate national team as defined under FIFA eligibility rules; some limited exceptions apply. Players may hold more than one non-FIFA nationality.

No.	Pos.	Nation	Player
1	GK	ENG	Ethan Ross
2	DF	ENG	Tre Pemberton
3	DF	ENG	Neil Kengni
4	MF	ENG	Jayden Clarke
5	DF	ENG	Kyle Ajayi
6	MF	ENG	Tate Campbell
7	MF	SCO	Kyle McAllister
8	MF	ENG	Nick Haughton
9	FW	YEM	D'Mani Mellor
10	FW	WAL	Ricardo Rees
11	MF	ENG	James Berry (on loan from Wycombe Wanderers)
12	GK	IRL	Luke McNicholas
13	GK	IRL	Fiachra Pagel
15	DF	WAL	Gabe Kircough
16	MF	ENG	Joshua Osude
17	MF	WAL	Oli Ewing
18	MF	ENG	Bryan Ifeanyi

No.	Pos.	Nation	Player
19	FW	ENG	Jose Marquez
20	MF	ENG	Sean Etaluku
21	FW	GRN	Kairo Mitchell
22	DF	ENG	Max Robson
23	DF	NGR	Emeka Obi
24	DF	SCO	Tom McIntyre
25	MF	SKN	Kyle Kelly (on loan from Liverpool)
26	DF	COD	Filozofe Mabete (on loan from Swindon Town)
27	DF	ENG	Freddie Sass
29	DF	GHA	Kelvin Abrefa (on loan from Reading)
30	MF	ENG	Adeteye Gbadehan
31	FW	NIR	Will Grigg
32	DF	ENG	Ryan Rydel (on loan from Stockport County)
33	FW	NED	Mees Rijks (on loan from Bristol Rovers)
38	MF	ENG	Akai Bonnick
45	MF	ENG	Jesse Aldridge
TBC	FW	IRL	Sean Patton (on loan from Reading)

=== Out on loan ===
Note: Flags indicate national team as defined under FIFA eligibility rules; some limited exceptions apply. Players may hold more than one non-FIFA nationality.

No.	Pos.	Nation	Player
14	FW	ENG	Omari Patrick (on loan at Southend)
—	DF	WAL	Cian Harries (on loan at Kidderminster Harriers)

== Coaching staff ==
As of 3 Oct 2026

- Manager: Post Vacant
- Assistant Manager: Post Vacant
- First team coach: (England) Yan Klukowski
- Goalkeeping coach: (England) Jonathan Gould
- Head of academy: Post Vacant

== Managerial history ==
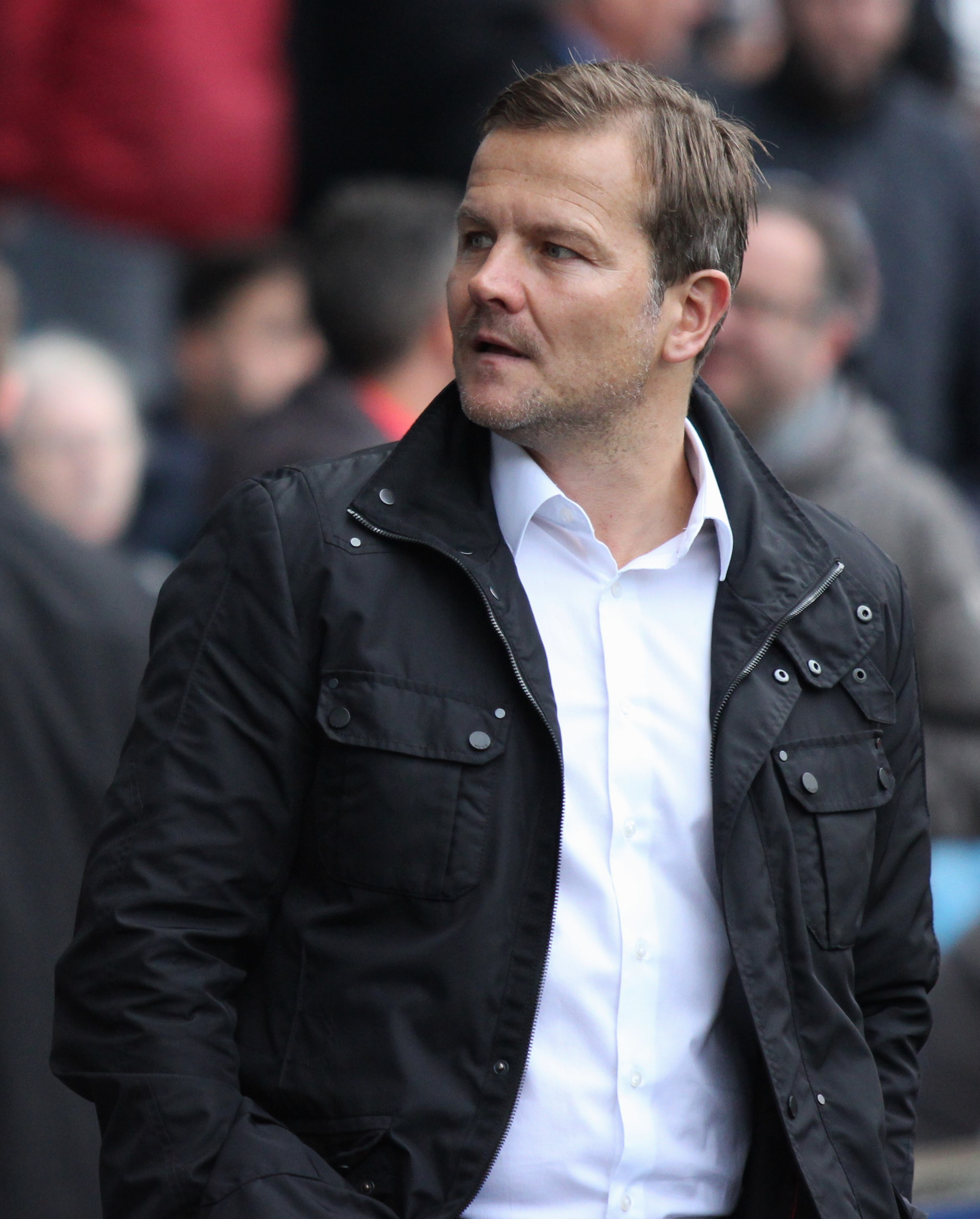
Mark Cooper is a former manager.

Dates	Names
1955–1956	(England) Bill Thomas
1957–1958	(England) Eddie Cowley
1958–1960	(England) Don Cowley
1966–1967	(England) Jimmy Sewell
1967–1968	(England) Alan Morris
1968–1979	(England) Peter Goring
1979–1980	(England) Tony Morris
1980–1982	(England) Bob Mursell
1982	(England) Roy Hillman
1983–1987	(England) Steve Millard
1987–1990	(England) John Evans
1990	(England) Jeff Evans
1990–1991	(England) Bobby Jones
1991–1992	(England) Tim Harris
1992	(England) Glenn Thomas
1992–1994	(England) Pat Casey
1994–2000	(England) Frank Gregan
2000–2001	(England) Nigel Spink and Dave Norton
2001–2002	(England) Nigel Spink
2002–2003	(England) Colin Addison
2003–2004	(England) Tim Harris
2004–2005	(England) Alan Lewer
2005–2006	(England) Gary Owers
2006	(England) Paul Wanless
2006–2009	(Northern Ireland) Jim Harvey
2009	(England) David Brown
2009–2013	(England) Dave Hockaday
2013	(England) Gary Seward
2013	(England) Scott Bartlett
2013–2016	(England) Adrian Pennock
2016	(England) Scott Bartlett
2016–2021	(England) Mark Cooper
2021	(England) Jimmy Ball
2021–2022	(Wales) Rob Edwards
2022–2023	(England) Ian Burchnall
2023	(Scotland) Duncan Ferguson
2023	(Wales) Hannah Dingley
2023	(England) David Horseman
2023–2024	(England) Troy Deeney
2024–2025	(England) Steve Cotterill
2025–2026	(Wales) Robbie Savage
2026	(England) Jonathan Gould

== Popular culture ==
The 2023 Jilly Cooper novel Tackle! is centred on the fictional side Searston Rovers, which is based on Forest Green Rovers.

== Records ==
- Best league position: 24th in League One, 2022–23
- Best FA Cup performance: Third round, 2008–09, 2009–10, 2022–23
- Best EFL Cup performance: Second round, 2018–19, 2019–20, 2021–22, 2022–23
- Best Welsh Cup performance: Quarter-finals, 1990–91
- Record attendance: 4,836 vs. Derby County, FA Cup third round, 3 January 2009
- Biggest victory: 18–1 vs. Dursley, Stroud League, March 1946
- Heaviest defeat: 10–0 vs. Gloucester City, Mid-Gloucestershire League, 13 January 1900
- Most appearances: 295 - Alex Sykes
- Most goals: 73 - Alex Sykes
- Longest-serving manager: 11 years - Peter Goring
- Record transfer fee paid: £25,000 to Bury for Adrian Randall
- Record transfer fee received: £350,000 from Hibernian for Christian Doidge

=== International capped players ===
Bold denotes player still actively playing international football

Player	Country	Caps whilst at club	Total Caps
Tony Daley	**(England)** England	0	7
Nigel Spink	**(England)** England	0	1
Leon Cort	Guyana	0	6
Alan McLoughlin	Republic of Ireland	0	43
Kayode Odejayi	Nigeria	0	1
Jefferson Louis	**(Dominica)** Dominica	0	1
Jonny Hayes	Republic of Ireland	0	4
Christian Edwards	Wales	0	1
Guy Ipoua	Cameroon	0	1
Joe O'Cearuill	Republic of Ireland	0	2
Craig Rocastle	Grenada	0	12
Omar Koroma	(The Gambia) Gambia	0	2
**Reece Styche**	**Gibraltar**	1	**29**
Abdul Majeed Waris	**(Ghana)** Ghana	0	33
Malvin Kamara	**(Sierra Leone)** Sierra Leone	0	1
Jake Thomson	**(Trinidad and Tobago)** Trinidad and Tobago	0	2
Donaldson Sackey	**(Togo)** Togo	0	1
**Wes Burns**	**Wales**	0	**3**
Nathaniel Jarvis	**(Antigua and Barbuda)** Antigua and Barbuda	0	13
Al Bangura	**(Sierra Leone)** Sierra Leone	0	3
David Pipe	Wales	0	1
**Dale Eve**	**Bermuda**	3	**28**
**Keanu Marsh-Brown**	**Guyana**	0	**15**
**Anthony Jeffrey**	**Guyana**	0	**7**
**Kieffer Moore**	**Wales**	0	**28**
**Ethan Pinnock**	**Jamaica**	0	**5**
**Curtis Tilt**	**Jamaica**	0	**2**
Jake Gosling	Gibraltar	0	12
Omar Bugiel	Lebanon	1	24
**Robert Sánchez**	**Spain**	0	**2**
Carl Winchester	Northern Ireland	0	1
George Williams	Wales	0	7
**Ebou Adams**	**(The Gambia) Gambia**	4	**11**
**Joe Wollacott**	**Ghana**	0	**11**
Dylan McGeouch	Scotland	0	2

In November 2022, former Forest Green Rovers players, Kieffer Moore and Robert Sánchez were named in the Wales and Spain squads respectively for the 2022 World Cup. They are the first and only former Rovers players to play in a World Cup.

== Honours ==
Forest Green Rovers's honours include the following:

League

- League Two (level 4)
  - Champions: 2021–22
- National League (level 5)
  - Play-off winners: 2017
- Southern League (level 6)
  - Champions: 1997–98
- Southern League Southern (level 7)
  - Champions: 1996–97
- Hellenic League
  - Champions: 1981–82

Cup

- FA Trophy
  - Runners-up: 1998–99, 2000–01
- Conference League Cup
  - Runners-up: 2008–09
- FA Vase
  - Winners: 1981–82

Minor

- Gloucestershire Senior Cup
  - Winners: 1984–85, 1985–86, 1986–87, 2015–16
- Gloucestershire Northern Senior League
  - Champions: 1937–38, 1949–50, 1950–51, 1976–77
  - Division Two champions: 1955–56, 1969–70, 1975–76
- Gloucestershire Northern Amateur Cup
  - Winners: 1920–21, 1926–27, 1945–46, 1971–72, 1975–76, 1977–78
- Stroud and District League
  - Champions: 1911–12, 1920–21, 1921–22, 1934–35, 1935–36, 1936–37, 1945–46, 1953–54, 1958–59
  - Division Two champions: 1938–39
  - Division Three champions: 1920–21, 1921–22, 1925–26,
- North Gloucestershire League
  - Champions: 1920–21, 1921–22
  - Division Two champions: 1921–22
- Dursley and District League
  - Champions: 1902–03, 1931–32, 1934–35, 1935–36, 1936–37
- Severn League
  - Champions: 1931–32, 1938–39
- Stroud Charity Cup
  - Winners: 1922–23, 1926–27, 1929–30, 1932–33, 1935–36, 1936–37, 1937–38, 1945–46, 1952–53, 1957–58, 1958–59, 1969–70, 1970–71, 1971–72, 1972–73, 1973–74
- Berkeley Hospital Cup
  - Winners: 1969–70, 1970–71, 1974–75
- David Russell Memorial Trophy
  - Winners: 1987–88
