= Hannah Dingley =

Welsh football coach (born 1983)

Personal information
- Date of birth: 19 July 1983 (age 43)
- Place of birth: St Albans, England

Managerial career
- Years: Team
- 2019–2024: Forest Green Rovers academy
- 2023: Forest Green Rovers (caretaker)

Hannah Dingley (born 19 July 1983) is a Welsh football coach and administrator who has served as Girls' Head of Academy at Manchester City since May 2025.

Prior to working with Manchester City, Dingley has served as the academy manager of National League club Forest Green Rovers. She was the first woman to have been in charge of a professional men's team, and the only in English football. She has also been in the role of Head of Women's and Girls Football with the Football Association of Ireland.

== Early life and education ==
Born in St Albans, Dingley was raised in Carmarthenshire, Wales, moving there at the age of four as her parents were from the area. As a youth, football was her passion and a "strong part of her family culture". As her school did not have a girls' team, she played for the local boys' club. She began coaching men's teams at aged 17. She attended Loughborough University and coached teams there, including boys' university teams and men's non-league football. She also undertook work experience at Swansea City.

Dingley earned a Bachelor of Science (BSc) in Sport and Exercise Science and Masters of Science (MSc) in Coaching from Loughborough. In a work experience role with Swansea City, Dingley would observe manager Jan Mølby training the team and during match days. This experience strengthened Dingley's desire to work in a managerial role in football.

Dingley holds a UEFA Pro Licence.

== Career ==
It frustrates me that female coaches might think the female game might be their only opportunity in the game. There are lots of opportunities in the men's game, academy football is massive. I was told I got the job because I was the best person for it.

— Hannah Dingley

Dingley worked as a course leader at Loughborough College in Sport & Exercise Science at the University of Wolverhampton in Sports Coaching Practice. She began her professional coaching career in 2011 with the Notts County under-9 boys team and Lincoln Ladies, later choosing to work exclusively with the ladies team.

In 2013 while working as a coach for Gresley, Dingley was subjected to verbal abuse by Northwich Victoria manager Lee Ashcroft, resulting in Ashcroft receiving a 10 match ban for using abusive and/or insulting words. She also worked at Shepshed Dynamo and Leicester Nirvana.

In 2013, she joined Burton Albion as an academy coach. From 2016 to 2019, she was a coach for their senior men's team.

In 2019, Dingley was hired as an academy manager at Forest Green Rovers, making her the first woman to take charge of a men's academy team in England. In 2021, she launched a girls' academy for Forest Green.

On 4 July 2023, she was appointed caretaker manager of Forest Green following the sacking of Duncan Ferguson. This move made Dingley the first woman to take charge of a men's senior English professional football team. Of the new role, Dingley said, "I've coached men for 20-odd years. This isn't different to me and I've never had a problem with players. They just want good coaching and a good programme." Forest Green owner Dale Vince noted, "It was a very simple decision. Hannah was the most qualified person at the club for the job. Nothing else came into frame."

She left her role as Rovers' caretaker manager on 17 July 2023, being replaced on a permanent basis by David Horseman. She returned to her role as the head of the academy.

In April 2024, the Football Association of Ireland announced that Dingley was to be appointed to the role of Head of Women's and Girls' Football from May. She resigned from her position in May 2025 after a year in the role, to join Manchester City as Girls' Head of Academy.
