= The Lawn Ground =

Former football ground in Forest Green, England

Coordinates: 51°41′54″N 2°14′0″W

- Interactive map of The Lawn Ground
- Location: Forest Green, Gloucestershire
- Capacity: 5,141 (2,000 seated)
- Surface: Grass
- Record attendance: 4,788 (Forest Green vs. Bristol Rovers, League One, 11 March 2023)

Construction
- Built: n/a (initially open field)
- Opened: 1890
- Expanded: 1950s (first stand); 1996 (Trevor Horsley Stand, terracing, amenities); 2001–2002 (Barnfield Terrace)
- Closed: 2006
- Demolished: 2006

Tenants
- Forest Green Rovers; Forest Green Rovers Ladies

The Lawn Ground was located in Nailsworth, Gloucestershire, England, and was, from 1890 to 2006, home to the English football club Forest Green Rovers. The Lawn Ground also hosted local cup finals as well as being home to Forest Green's Ladies and youth sides.

The ground was located at the top of a steep hill in the hamlet of Forest Green and had a total capacity of 5,141 people. Forest Green matches drew approximately 1,000 spectators on average at the Lawn Ground. The ground's record attendance is 3,002 for a match between Forest Green and St Albans City, in a FA Trophy semi-final on 18 April 1999.

Until the 1950s, the Lawn was little more than an open field, but the Rovers' success required upgrades to the stadium. At this point, terraces were constructed for fans and a "famously partial leveling of the pitch" occurred.

In 1996, the Trevor Horsley Stand, named after the chairman of the club, Trevor Horsley, was constructed for over £200,000. This stand seated 300 and included three hospitality boxes, underground changing rooms, a board room, function room, bar, a health suite and offices. It also featured a quirky watermill behind the stand. Aside from the Trevor Horsley Stand, the rest of the ground, about 80 percent, was terraced.

The biggest terrace stand was the covered Barnfield Terrace. The terrace was built during 2001 and 2002 to increase the ground's capacity, and Forest Green fans paid to have their names engraved onto bricks inside that stand. The Barnfield Terrace was sponsored by Rockwool. When the club left the ground at the end of the 2005–2006 season, the stand was transferred brick by brick to their new ground.

Other sections of the Lawn Ground included the Nympsfield Road Terrace which was located behind a goal at the northern end of the ground.

The Lawn Ground was demolished and turned into housing after the club moved into the new, modern The New Lawn Stadium, which now hosts all their matches. Forest Green began playing at the new stadium which is only a few hundred yards from the old Lawn, from the start of the 2006–2007 season.
