= David Horseman =

English football coach

Personal information
- Date of birth: 26 December 1983 (age 42)

Team information
- Current team: Arsenal (under-21s head coach)

Managerial career
- Years: Team
- 2019–2023: Southampton B
- 2023: Forest Green Rovers
- 2024: Bristol Rovers (caretaker)

David Horseman (born 26 December 1983) is an English football coach who is the Under-21s Head Coach at Arsenal.

== Career ==
Horseman joined Southampton in August 2019 after coaching Bristol City and Watford. He managed Southampton B, but was also involved with their first team.

On 17 July 2023, he was appointed as head coach of Forest Green Rovers, replacing caretaker manager Hannah Dingley. He said he was "incredibly proud" to take up the role. After winning only two of their first seven games, Horseman said the players had to deal with their nerves. On 20 December 2023, Forest Green Rovers parted ways with him by mutual consent.

On 1 July 2024, Horseman was appointed first-team coach at League One side Bristol Rovers. In December 2024, following the sacking of manager Matt Taylor, Horseman was appointed caretaker manager alongside fellow first-team coach Lee Cattermole. He remained with the club after Iñigo Calderón was appointed manager on 26 December, although Cattermole left the club. He departed the club following relegation at the end of the 2024–25 season.

In September 2025, Horseman joined the academy of Arsenal in the role of Elite Player Development Coach. He was appointed Under-21s Head Coach in August 2026.

== Managerial statistics ==
As of match played 26 December 2024

Managerial record by team and tenure
Team	From	To	Record				
Team	From	To	P	W	D	L	Win %
Forest Green Rovers	17 July 2023	20 December 2023	29	7	6	16	24.1
Bristol Rovers (caretaker)	16 December 2024	26 December 2024	2	0	1	1	0.0
Total			31	7	7	17	22.6
