= 1990–91 Welsh Cup =

Football competition in Wales

The 1990–91 Welsh Cup winners were Swansea City. The final was played at the National Stadium in Cardiff in front of an attendance of 11,840

== Fourth round ==
Tie no	Home team	Score	Away team
1	Aberystwyth Town	1–3	Hereford United
2	Ammanford Town	0–5	Wrexham
3	B.P Llandarcy	0–5	Stroud
4	Bangor City	4–1	Lex XI
5	Caernarfon Town	1–2	Abergavenny Thursdays
6	Barry Town	3–1	Cheltenham Town
7	Merthyr Tydfil	0–1	Swansea City
8	Newport	0–1	Colwyn Bay

== Quarter-finals ==
Tie no	Home team	Score	Away team
1	Barry Town	1–1	Bangor City
Replay	Bangor City	0–1	Barry Town
2	Colwyn Bay	1–1	Swansea City
Replay	Swansea City	1–0	Colwyn Bay
3	Bangor City	0–0	Hereford United
Replay	Hereford United	0–0	Bangor City
Hereford win 4–3 on penalties
4	Stroud	1–2	Wrexham

== Semi-finals – 1st leg ==
Tie no	Home team	Score	Away team
1	Barry Town	2–2	Swansea City
2	Wrexham	1–1	Hereford United

== Semi-finals – 2nd leg ==
Tie no	Home team	Score	Away team
1	Swansea City	1–0	Barry Town
2	Hereford United	1–2	Wrexham

== Final ==
19 May 1991
15:00

Swansea City	2–0	Wrexham
Penney; Raynor

Cardiff Arms Park, Cardiff
Attendance: 11,840
Referee: K Burge (South Wales)

Swansea City	Wrexham
