= Edwin Quintero =

Ecuadorian footballer (born 2009)

Personal information
- Full name: Edwin Josué Quintero Preciado
- Date of birth: 15 August 2009 (age 17)
- Place of birth: Esmeraldas, Ecuador
- Height: 1.73 m (5 ft 8 in)
- Positions: Right winger; midfielder

Team information
- Current team: Independiente del Valle
- Number: 56

Youth career
- Independiente del Valle

Senior career*
Years	Team	Apps	(Gls)
2026–	Independiente del Valle	11	(1)

International career^{‡}
2024	Ecuador U15	6	(1)
2025–	Ecuador U17	12	(3)
- * Club domestic league appearances and goals as of 09:48, 20 October 2026 (UTC) ‡ National team caps and goals as of 09:48, 20 October 2026 (UTC)

Edwin Josué Quintero Preciado (born 15 August 2009) is an Ecuadorian professional footballer who plays as a right-winger for Ecuadorian Serie A club Independiente del Valle. He will join English side Arsenal in August 2027, alongside his brother, Holger Quintero.

== Early and personal life ==
Born in the Esmeraldas Province of Ecuador, Quintero is the twin brother of fellow footballer Holger Quintero.

== Club career ==
Having joined the academy of Independiente del Valle at a young age, Quintero represented Independiente del Valle at the Albion Tournament in Uruguay in February 2025, where he and his brother both scored in the semi-final against Brazilian side Internacional. His performances at youth level reportedly drew interest from English club Arsenal, as well as German and Spanish sides Bayern Munich and Sevilla, respectively. In early December 2025, it was announced that Arsenal had agreed to sign him and his brother Holger, with the deal valid when they turn 18 in August 2027.

== International career ==
Called up to the Ecuador under-17 side for the 2025 South American U-17 Championship, Quintero scored two goals against Bolivia in Ecuador's 2–1 win.

== Style of play ==
A right-winger, also capable of playing in midfield, Quintero has drawn stylistic comparisons to Brazil's record goal-scorer Neymar.

== Honours ==
Independiente del Valle

- LigaPro Serie A: 2026
