= Tilmann Wröbel =

Franco-German fashion designer

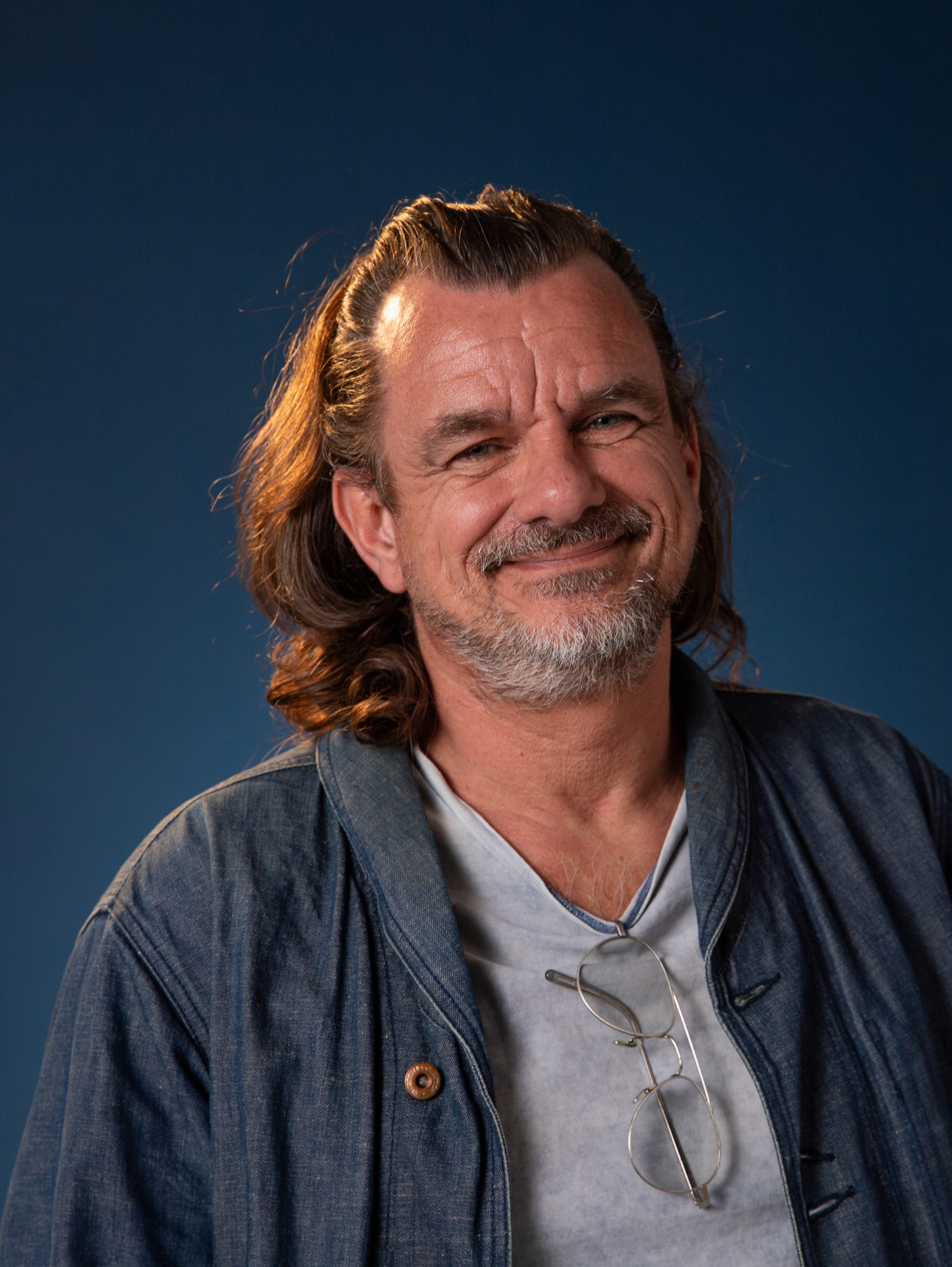
- Tilmann Wröbel in 2024
- Born: 22 July 1964; Düsseldorf, Germany
- Occupation: Fashion designer

Tilmann Wröbel is a Franco-German fashion designer born in 1964 in Düsseldorf, Germany. He is currently working and living in both Biarritz, France and Düsseldorf, Germany.

== Biography ==
=== Background in Haute Couture ===
In the '80s, Tilmann Wröbel arrived in Paris and enrolled at the Chambre Syndicale de la Couture Parisienne as a student fashion designer. During his studies, he demonstrated an exceptional skill-set that set him apart from his classmates.

After his first year, he was already working at Christian Dior's Haute Couture as a long-term intern. Thanks to a school project (a retrospective about André Courrèges and his work) Courrèges offered him a position. Tilmann went back to school to graduate, working at Nina Ricci's Haute Couture studio, located on avenue Montaigne, while he studied.

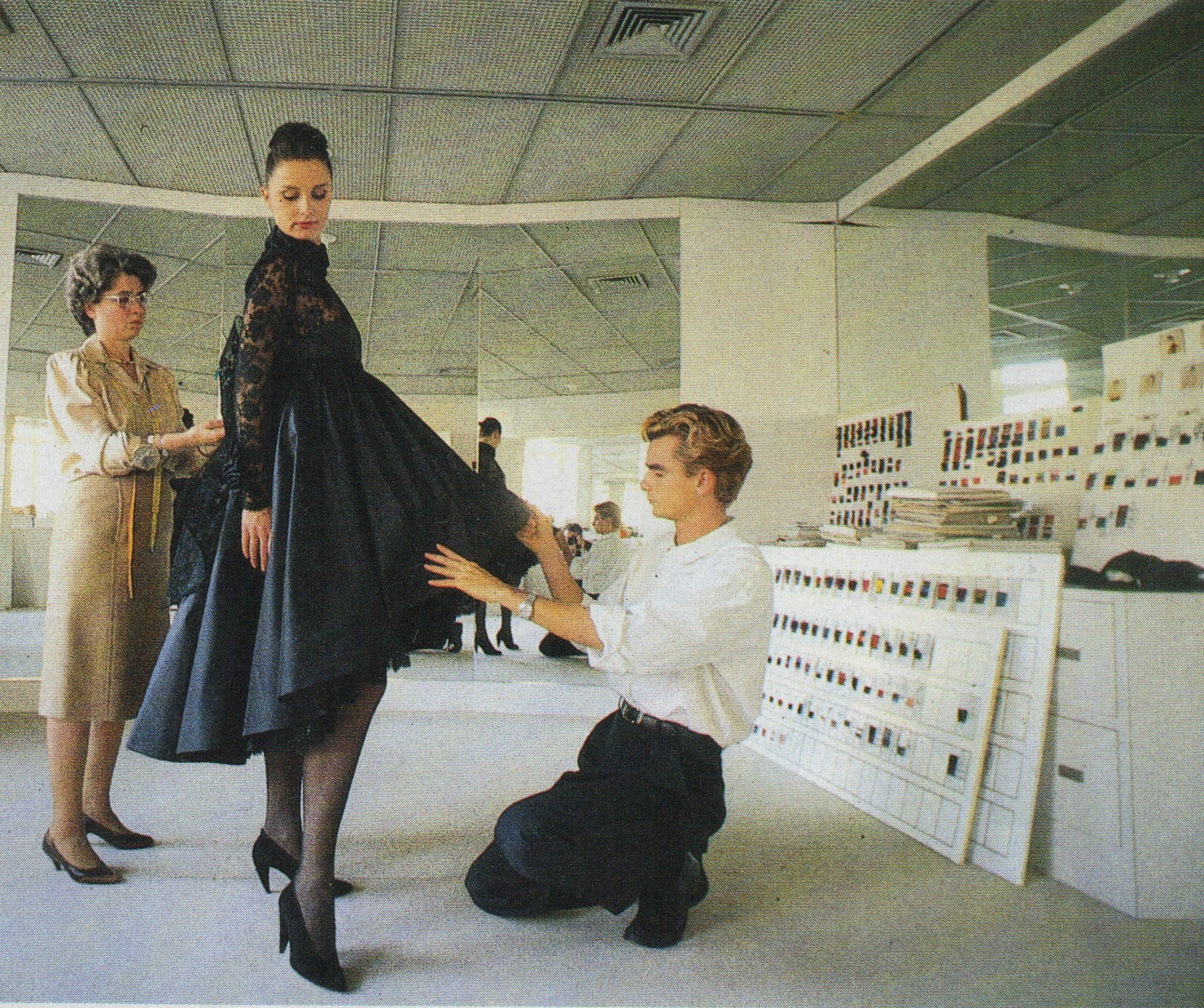
This photo, taken in the '80s, shows Tilmann Wröbel when he was competing for the Colbert Prize. This photo first appeared in Femme Magazine.

In 1985 Tilmann was awarded with the Comité Colbert prize for his Nina Ricci Haute Couture project. He was also finalist at the Concours des jeunes créateurs Air France Yomiuri Shimbun.

=== From Haute Couture, to Sportswear & Denim ===
In 1988, Tilmann was member of the board of directors of the French Skateboard Federation and referee for every championship. His passion for skateboard culture lead him to work with Etnies and Homeboy in 1989, designing apparel ranges for both brands. In 1990, he co-founded the first French indoor skate-park.

In 1994, he joined French denim brand Chipie. The next year, he was appointed head designer for the brand. During his time with Chipie, Tilmann worked with Jean Elbaz, Christian Sansat, and other international denim experts.

Between 1997 and 2007, he designed surfwear and streetwear for the Quiksilver group.

In 2007, he started working as an independent designer for the Quiksilver Group and founded his own consultancy, Monsieur-T. - The Denim Lifestyle Studio.

Wröbel has worked with Monsieur-T. as Denim Consultant for international Brands such as Lee Cooper, Japan Blue, Pull-In and Zadig & Voltaire as much as for fairs such as the International Denim Trade Show BLUEZONE by Munich Fabric Start.

In 2019, Wröbel was named one of the Rivet 50, an index of the 50 most influential people in the denim voted by the global industry. He was recognized for his "luxury-meets-streetwear" approach to denim design.

Since 2020, Tilmann Wröbel has been a regular contributor to Inside Denim, a global publication on the denim industry, reporting on denim factories around the world, industry issues and supporting the editorial team with his insight and experience in the industry.

In 2021-2022, Tilmann Wröbel contributed as a professional expert from the denim sector to a linguistic research project focused on English borrowings and English-influenced neologisms in the terminology of women’s ready-to-wear fashion in France. Thanks to his expertise and his knowledge of the field, Tilmann Wröbel has provided fundamental information on this sector, which is clearly dominated by specific brands. Beyond information on the denominative choices made by brands, his contribution has shed light on behaviors of belonging and distinction in terms of terminology choices, which helped the researcher to compare them with Bourdieusian theories on the legitimate language and the symbolic value of language (Pierre Bourdieu, Ce que parler veut dire, 1982, Fayard).

In 2022 Tilmann Wrobel, in partnership with Greek denim tailor Themis Goudroubis, launched his own denim brand, HANDZ. The brand, which combines the strengths of the worlds of heritage and couture denim, addresses an underserved segment of the heritage denim market: women. Their gender-fluid fits have been extremely well received in the world of heritage denim, which led to a in-depth profile on Denimhunters in 2024.

During the process of rebooting the Kaporal brand, which emphasised the brands roots and identity in DENIM, Tilmann Wrobel was appointed creative director of the Marseille-based brand in July 2023.

== Media ==
- Wirajuda, Tunggul (3 April 2014). "Behind the Love for Jeans, the Versatility of Denim". thejakartaglobe.com.
- "Meet The Denim Expert: Tilmann Wröbel • GEEKSBIBLE ±". geeksbible.com. 18 April 2014.
- "Meet Tilmann Wrobel, Denim Expert from Paris". freemagz.com (in Indonesian). 25 June 2014.
- "Tilmann Wröbel (Monsieur-T.): "Aujourd'hui, la marque qui ne connaît …". FashionMag.com (in French). 3 July 2013.
- Mirande, Yves (19 April 2012). "Dress code : comment s'habille-t-on chez Monsieur-T ?". lentreprise.lexpress.fr (in French).
- Westerman, Anna. "Nadel & Pen, offers luxurious hand sewn tailored jeans : Flux Magazine". fluxmagazine.com (in French).
- "Nadel & Pen : quand le blue jean devient haute couture". masculin.com. 18 October 2011.
- Martin-Bernard, Frédéric (21 November 2012). "Denim d'initiés". Madame Figaro (in French).
- Bickenbach, Linda-Luise (9 November 2012). "Jeans-Unikate von "Nadel & Pen"". luxus.welt.de (in German).
- Gerads, Andreas (19 September 2013). "Jeans, genäht in reiner Handarbeit". stilmagazin.com (in German).
- Szabo, Bryan (19 September 2024). "Brand Profile of Handz Jeans, the Gender-Fluid Selvedge Brand". Denimhunters.
