= Frank Leder =

German fashion designer (born 1974)

- Born: 25 September 1974 (age 51)
- Education: Central Saint Martins College of Art and Design
- Awards: 2002 Deutsche Bank Pyramid Award

Frank Leder (born 25 September 1974 in Nuremberg, Germany) is a German fashion designer. His work focuses on his German cultural heritage.

== Biography ==
Frank Leder studied at Central Saint Martins College of Art and Design in London, where he was awarded an MA with distinction. He developed his brand while still in College, establishing himself in London with forward thinking Fashion Shows as well as contributing as Art Director and Stylist to Fashion Magazines like i-D and Sleazenation. Through these works, Leder dealt with his position in the fashion industry in an intellectual way. His work often breaks with the idea of a traditional method of presentation by proposing a different viewpoint. Showing from 2000 to 2002 at London Fashion Week, he switched to the Men's Fashion Week in Paris, after moving 2002 to Berlin.

2002 Frank Leder was awarded the Deutsche Bank Pyramid Award in England. 2003 saw the launch of Frank Leder's Womenswear Line.

The leitmotif of Frank Leder's work are themes related to German culture and history. All of his collections are characterized by recurring thematic concepts and integration of German cultural elements, often creating a storyline which work on different levels of perception. The garments are rooted in German history, using references from workwear to traditional men's tailoring, but combining those images with contemporary cuts and unusual, but accessible and design elements, making them adapted to contemporary fashion contexts. Themes of his collections deal with the course of his father's life, traditional German societies like fighting students and small town firemen brigades, German working-class people like miners, bakers and butchers, military themes like submarine men, or Germany's colonial past. In combining a mischievous curiosity with a nod to tradition and a healthy sense of humor, Leder's work is associated with a distinct style in contemporary fashion.

Developing the visual presentation of his work, Leder has collaborated with German photographer Gregor Hohenberg. Whether staging a show for the blind or inviting buyers and press to view his collection in his father's hometown in Bohemia.

The collections are completely produced in Germany, using mainly fabrics from German companies. Traditional German fabrics are sourced, like Deutschleder or Schladminger, which have become signature pieces. The buttons Leder uses on his garments are mainly vintage, antique buttons from the 1920 or 1930's.

Frank Leder garments are worn by artists, actors and musicians. Leder currently works with a variety of these artists who appear regularly as models in his publications.

== Other work ==
Leder likes to work with those people on a wide scale of subjects, one cooperation resulting in the label Raw Power with fellow designer Michael Ellis from 2000 to 2006 and with Austrian singer/songwriter Florian Horwath which led to the project called The Essence starting in 2005.

The work of The Essence is manifested through travels, exhibitions and selected offered items in a context between art and fashion. The Essence should be understood as a field of experimentation and conceptional exploration into topics ranging from art to design, resulting in items of jewellery, clothes and art works, which find their place in fashion shops as well as art galleries.

As well as designing annually two men's and womenswear collections, Leder also designs limited furniture pieces, design objects and interiors for selected clients. Leder's work has been featured in various gallery exhibitions around the globe, and is also regularly featured in various design publications and fashion magazines, making him one of the most well known German designers of his generation. Frank Leder is also a guest lecturer at universities in Germany.
