= South East Counties League =

- Organising body: FA
- Founded: 1954
- First season: 1954–55
- Folded: 1998
- Country: England
- Last champions: Luton Town (1st title)
- Most championships: Tottenham Hotspur (13 titles)

The South East Counties League (SECL) was a football league for the youth teams of clubs from Southern England.

The competition grew out of the Middlesex Youth Invitation Cup set up in the 1950s by the Middlesex FA and was formerly known as the South East Counties Youth Football League. For many years it was the top level of youth football in the region, a second division was added in 1964 this more often than not included teams from division one, these teams putting out their younger youth players. There was also a League Cup called "Division One League Cup" which was, in 1986, superseded by the "South East Counties League Cup". The setup of the FA Premier Youth League, a nationwide competition for the top clubs, in 1997 took many of the top clubs away. The SECL continued for another season with some clubs putting out their youth reserve teams,.

However, in 1998, the Premier Youth League was expanded and renamed the FA Premier Academy League, while a second tier of nationwide youth football, the Football League Youth Alliance was founded, absorbing the remaining teams, meaning the South East Counties League was abandoned.

== List of winners ==
Season	Winners	Runners-up
1954–55	Chelsea	Fulham
1955–56	Arsenal	Chelsea
1956–57	Chelsea	Arsenal
1957–58	Chelsea	Charlton Athletic
1958–59	Chelsea	Bexleyheath & Welling
1959–60	Chelsea	Arsenal
1960–61	Chelsea	Arsenal
1961–62	Chelsea	Arsenal
1962–63	Chelsea	Queens Park Rangers
1963–64	Queens Park Rangers	Chelsea
1964–65	Arsenal	Queens Park Rangers
1965–66	Queens Park Rangers	Arsenal
1966–67	Charlton Athletic	Ipswich
1967–68	Queens Park Rangers	Chelsea
1968–69	Millwall	Ipswich
1969–70	Tottenham Hotspur	Millwall
1970–71	Tottenham Hotspur	Arsenal
1971–72	Arsenal	Tottenham Hotspur
1972–73	Tottenham Hotspur	Arsenal
1973–74	Chelsea	Leyton Orient
1974–75	Ipswich	Tottenham Hotspur
1975–76	Ipswich	Southend United
1976–77	Ipswich	Chelsea
1977–78	Queens Park Rangers	Ipswich
1978–79	Tottenham Hotspur	Ipswich
1979–80	Norwich City	Queens Park Rangers
1980–81	Tottenham Hotspur	Watford
1981–82	Queens Park Rangers	West Ham United
1982–83	Norwich City	Queens Park Rangers
1983–84	Chelsea	Norwich City
1984–85	West Ham United	Ipswich
1985–86	Tottenham Hotspur	Chelsea
1986–87	Tottenham Hotspur	Watford
1987–88	Tottenham Hotspur	Watford
1988–89	Tottenham Hotspur	Arsenal
1989–90	Tottenham Hotspur	Chelsea
1990–91	Arsenal	Tottenham Hotspur
1991–92	Tottenham Hotspur	Arsenal
1992–93	Tottenham Hotspur	Millwall
1993–94	Queens Park Rangers	Tottenham Hotspur
1994–95	Tottenham Hotspur	Chelsea
1995–96	West Ham United	Tottenham Hotspur
1996–97	Norwich City	Chelsea
1997–98	West Ham United	Portsmouth
1998–99	Luton Town	Leyton Orient
