= Anton Blackwood =

Footballer (born 1991)

Personal information
- Full name: Anton Raenel Jopseph Blackwood
- Date of birth: 18 August 1991 (age 35)
- Place of birth: London, England
- Height: 5 ft 11 in (1.80 m)
- Position: Right-back

Youth career
- Arsenal

Senior career*
Years	Team	Apps	(Gls)
2009–2010	Tottenham Hotspur	0	(0)
2011	Aveley	1	(0)
2012	St Albans City	1	(0)
2012–2013	Barton Rovers		
2013	Thurrock		
2014–2015	Cheshunt		
2015–2017	Haringey Borough		

International career
2012	Antigua and Barbuda	2	(0)
- * Club domestic league appearances and goals

Anton Raenel Jopseph Blackwood (born 18 August 1991) is a former professional footballer who most recently worked as a coach for Tottenham Hotspur. He is a former Antigua and Barbuda international.

== Club career ==
Born in London, Blackwood's early career was at Arsenal, before he was released in 2009. He then joined Tottenham Hotspur on a one-year contract.

He played one league game for Aveley in October 2011, then moved to St Albans City in February 2012, and Barton Rovers in September 2012. In February 2013 he trialled with American club Tampa Bay Rowdies.

At the start of the 2013–14 season Blackwood signed for Thurrock. He was released at the turn of 2013. In the summer of 2014 he was signed by Cheshunt, and by Haringey Borough in the summer of 2015.

== International career ==
Blackwood made his debut for the Antigua and Barbuda national team on 29 February 2012 in a friendly match against Trinidad & Tobago. He was injured and had to be substituted after 16 minutes of the match.

== Coaching career ==
After a spell coaching at Tottenham Hotspur as part of the club's global development programme, Blackwood began coaching Tottenham's women's team and on 4 August 2023 was appointed women's first team transitional coach, helping the young players with their progression to senior level. Blackwood left the club in January 2025.
