= Holger Quintero =

Ecuadorian footballer (born 2007)

Personal information
- Full name: Holger Jamil Quintero Preciado
- Date of birth: 15 August 2009 (age 17)
- Place of birth: Ecuador
- Height: 1.72 m (5 ft 8 in)
- Position: Midfielder

Team information
- Current team: Independiente del Valle
- Number: 57

Youth career
- Independiente del Valle

Senior career*
Years	Team	Apps	(Gls)
2026–	Independiente del Valle	2	(0)

International career^{‡}
2024	Ecuador U15	4	(0)
2024–2026	Ecuador U17		
- * Club domestic league appearances and goals as of 09:48, 20 October 2026 (UTC) ‡ National team caps and goals as of 09:48, 20 October 2026 (UTC)

Holger Jamil Quintero Preciado (born 15 August 2009) is an Ecuadorian professional footballer who plays as a midfielder for Ecuadorian Serie A club Independiente del Valle. He will join English side Arsenal in August 2027, alongside his brother, Edwin Quintero.

== Early life ==
Quintero was born on 15 August 2009 in Ecuador. He is the twin brother of Ecuadorian footballer Edwin Quintero.

== Club career ==
As a youth player, Quintero joined the youth academy of Ecuadorian side Independiente del Valle. During the summer of 2027, he will join the youth academy of English side Arsenal.

== Style of play ==
Quintero plays as a midfielder. Known for his speed, he is also known for his dribbling ability.

== Honours ==
Independiente del Valle

- LigaPro Serie A: 2026
