= Donaldson Sackey =

Togolese footballer (born 1988)

Personal information
- Full name: Donaldson Nukunu Sackey
- Date of birth: 30 September 1988 (age 38)
- Place of birth: Lomé, Togo
- Height: 1.81 m (5 ft 11 in)
- Position: Striker

Youth career
- Hertha BSC

Senior career*
Years	Team	Apps	(Gls)
2008–2010	Tennis Borussia Berlin		
2010	Compostela		
2010–2011	FC Oss	0	(0)
2011	Oststeinbeker SV	2	(0)
2011–2012	Forest Green Rovers		
2012–2013	Stockport Sports		
2013	Cray Wanderers		

International career
2011	Togo	1	(0)
- * Club domestic league appearances and goals

Donaldson Nukunu Sackey (born 30 September 1988) is a Togolese entrepreneur, fashion designer, architect, and former international footballer who played as a striker.

== Early and personal life ==
Born in Lomé, Togo, and raised in Germany, Sackey also holds German citizenship.

== Football career ==
Sackey spent his early career in Germany, Spain and Netherlands, playing for Hertha BSC, Tennis Borussia Berlin, Compostela, FC Oss and Oststeinbeker SV. After playing for English club Forest Green Rovers, he signed for Stockport Sports in August 2012, before moving to Cray Wanderers in April 2013.

He made his international debut for Togo in 2011.

== Fashion career ==
Sackey began as a model for various brands and was voted Top Model of the Year in 2013 by Fashion Odds magazine. Sackey founded the CPxArt fashion brand with his partner Sainey Sidibeh. Their work has included the 'Wu Wear' for the hip hop group Wu Tang Clan.

== Education ==
Sackey finished his Architecture Course at Harvard Graduate School of Design in 2018.
