= Narada Bernard =

Jamaican-English footballer (born 1981)

Personal information
- Full name: Narada Michael Bernard
- Date of birth: 30 January 1981 (age 45)
- Place of birth: Bristol, England
- Position: Left-back

Youth career
- Tottenham Hotspur
- –1999: Arsenal

Senior career*
Years	Team	Apps	(Gls)
1999–2000	Arsenal	0	(0)
2000–2003	AFC Bournemouth	29	(0)
2003	Woking	8	(0)
2003–2004	Torquay United	1	(0)
2004	Welling United	1	(1)
2004–2005	Farnborough Town		(0)
2005	Dover Athletic	29	(1)
2005	Hemel Hempstead Town	6	(0)
2005	Fisher Athletic	0	(0)
2005–2006	Weymouth	30	(1)
2006–2007	Maidenhead United		
2007	→ Bishop's Stortford (loan)		
2007–2008	Bishop's Stortford	19	(0)
2008–2009	Margate	8	(0)
2009	St Albans City		
Total		125	(2)

International career
2004	Jamaica	1	(0)
- * Club domestic league appearances and goals

Narada Michael Bernard (born 30 November 1981) is a Jamaican-English former professional footballer, who played as a left-back. Bernard, who was capped for the Jamaica national team, is currently a personal trainer and was recently mentioned on That Peter Crouch Podcast.

== Career ==
Narada Bernard began his career with Tottenham Hotspur before moving, as a trainee, to local rivals Arsenal, turning professional in August 1999. He played alongside Ashley Cole in the reserves for Arsenal, but failed to break into the first team.

He moved to AFC Bournemouth on a free transfer in 2000, signing a two-year contract. His time at Bournemouth was disrupted by injuries and he was released at the end of the 2002–03 season having played 38 first team games. He had an unsuccessful trial with Kidderminster Harriers in July 2003.

Bernard signed for Woking in August 2003, joining Torquay United in November 2003. At Torquay he trained alongside former Arsenal youth team colleagues Lee Canoville and Jo Kuffour, but played only once for the first team (as a late substitute for Canoville in the 1–1 draw at home to York City on 13 December) before being released by Torquay manager Leroy Rosenior in January 2004.

On 2 June 2004 Bernard made his only appearance for Jamaica in a 1–0 defeat against the Republic of Ireland in the Unity Cup at the Valley when he came on as late substitute for Deon Burton.

Bernard joined Welling United in September 2004. He had a further unsuccessful trial with Kidderminster Harriers in December 2004. He moved to Barnet and then to Farnborough Town in January 2005, but played just 4 games before being released in March 2005 when he joined Dover Athletic. He spent August 2005 with Yeading and in December 2005 was playing for Hemel Hempstead Town. In 2006 Bernard was playing for Fisher Athletic, and moved to Rushden & Diamonds in January 2007, before leaving only a few weeks later to join up with ex-Bournemouth colleague Jason Tindall at Weymouth. He signed a new one-year deal at Weymouth at the start of July 2007. In February 2008 Bernard joined Maidenhead United.

In January 2009 Bernard joined Hertfordshire club Bishop's Stortford on a one-month loan deal. The move was made permanent later that month. In August 2009 he signed for Isthmian League Premier Division Margate, making his debut at home to Dartford on 18th of that month.
