= Christian Roth =

American fashion designer

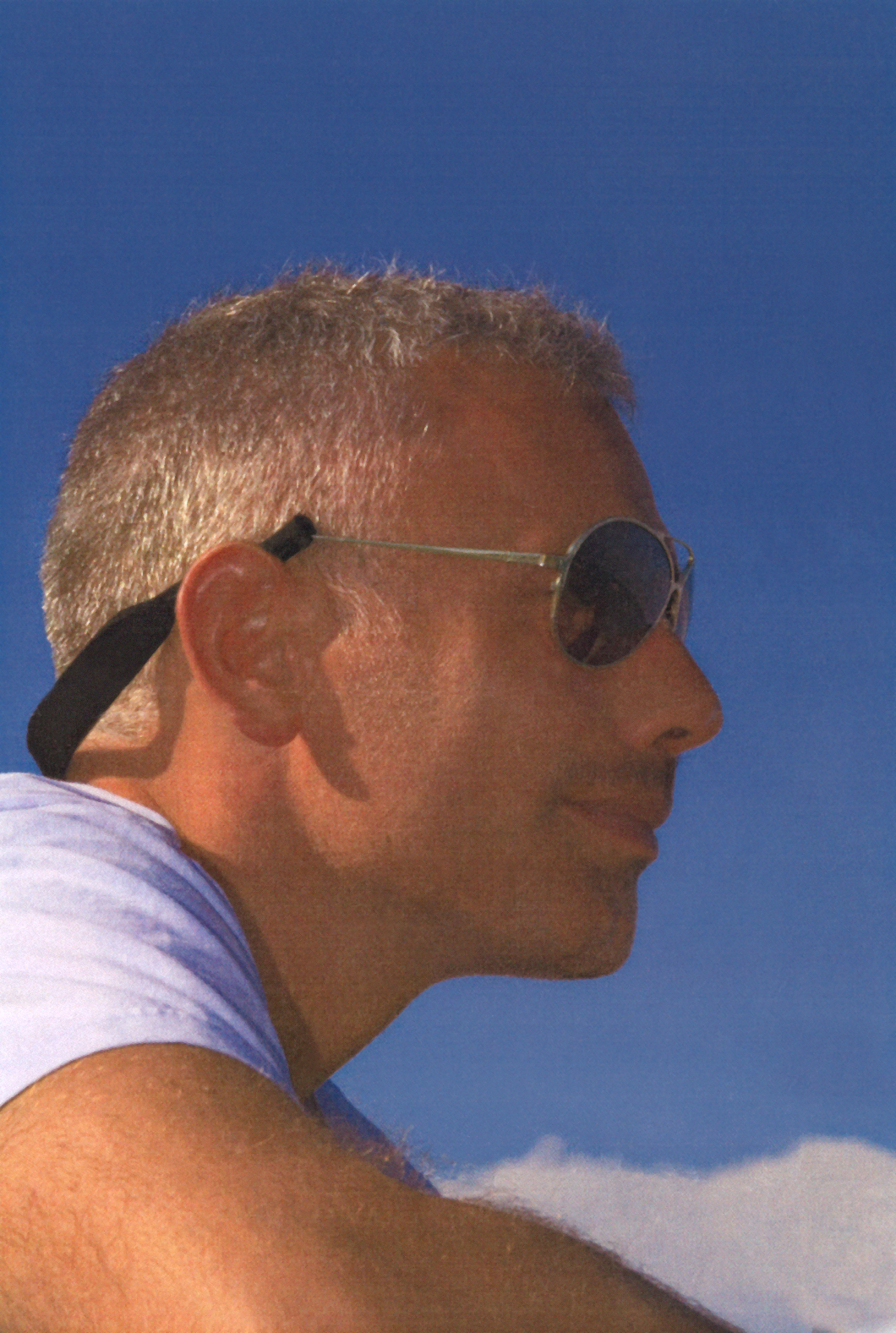
- Occupation: Fashion Designer
- Known for: Designer Eyewear
- Labels: Christian Roth; Optical Affairs
- Website: https://opticalaffairs.com

Christian Roth (born in Hanover, Germany) is a designer of luxury eyewear, co-founder with Eric Domege of the eponymous brands Christian Roth and Optical Affairs.

== Biography ==
Roth is the son to Dr. Fritz-Jürgen and Sabine Roth, geb. von Prittwitz und Gaffron, and recalls receiving a pair of Ray-Bans from his father at age 14 as a defining moment in discovering his passion for eyewear. In 1980, He started his career in West Berlin as an assistant to the late fashion photographer Rico Puhlmann. In 1978, he met French-born Eric Domege in Paris and together they founded Optical Affairs in 1983 after making a hit at Peter Kea's fashion show. A company focused exclusively on creative eyewear design was a novelty back then. Their design eyewear was depicted on the covers of Women's Wear Daily and Vogue.

During the 1980s, the duo's colorful designs gained interest and support from Andy Warhol's Factory.

In 1990, Roth and the brand were inducted into the Council of Fashion Designers of America. Roth was the first eyewear designer to join the CFDA.

In 1996, the duo sold the Christian Roth brand to an investment house. Roth and Domege lived almost 20 years in Monaco, and bought back their brand's trademarks during a silent auction after the new owner went out of business in 1998.

In 1998, Roth and Domege formed a partnership with the Charmant Group to produce and distribute Christian Roth eyewear worldwide. In 2002, the pair was honored by the art world with the inclusion of their designs from the 1980s and 1990s in the "Taking Eyeglasses Seriously" exhibition at the Triennale di Milano. From 2000 to 2004, they collaborated with designer Michael Kors on his eyewear collections. The pair has also worked with Karl Lagerfeld on his line of fashion eyewear from 2007 to 2011.

In 2010, Christian Roth ended its 12-year licensing deal with Charmant. In 2011, Christian Roth granted Korean-based eyewear firm BCD Korea, Co. Ltd the license the produce and distribute Christian Roth eyewear throughout Asia. In 2012, Christian Roth and Eric Domege founded the firm Optical Affairs Company and launched their e-commerce website christian-roth.com. On October 6, 2014, The Council of Fashion Designers of America has created a new committee, The Eyewear Designers of the Council of Fashion Designers of America CFDA, (edCFDA), which aims to boost the profile of the eyewear sector. Christian Roth was acting as the group's spokesman from 2014 to 2024. In 2015, DITA Group acquired Christian Roth Eyewear.

== Brand ==
Christian Roth eyewear products do not show the brand's name.

Christian Roth is the official sunglasses supplier of Haas F1 Team Driver Romain Grosjean.

== Personal life ==
Roth married his partner, Eric Domege, on January 9, 2015, in Miami Beach, Florida.

== See also ==
- Gentle Monster
- Ray-Ban
