= Boris Bidjan Saberi =

German menswear designer

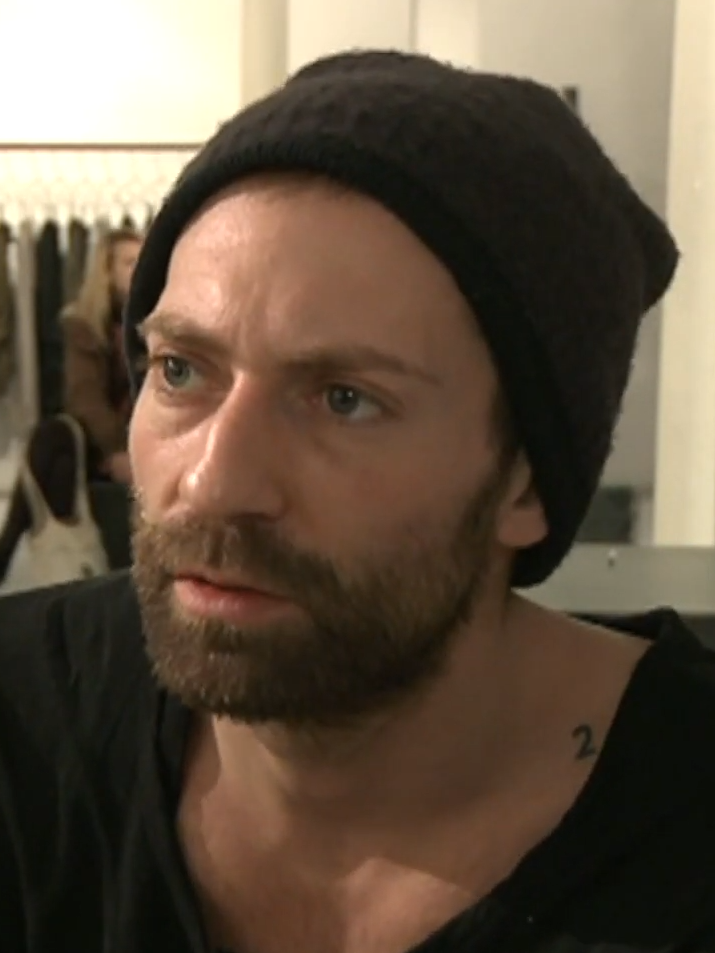
- Saberi in a 2019 interview with BBC Persian
- Born: 11 September 1978; Munich, West Germany
- Occupation: Fashion designer

Boris Bidjan Saberi is a German menswear designer based in Barcelona. His work is noted for its wide range of references, including skate culture, streetstyle, hip-hop, and clothing from the Middle East.

== Early life ==
Saberi was born in Munich on 11 September 1978 to a German mother and Persian father. His parents both worked in fashion, running their own label, and introduced their son to the industry early on. He studied fashion design in Barcelona, graduating in 2006.

== Career ==
While still a student, Saberi launched his first label, a leather accessory line called 'UCANFUCKW' in 2003 or 2004. After graduation, he launched his eponymous label in 2006. While he lives and works in Spain, Saberi has regularly presented his collections at Paris Fashion Week, though he debuted in Barcelona. The avant garde nature, sombreness, and elegant "schlampigkeit" (sloppiness) of his work has led to comparisons with Ann Demeulemeester and Rick Owens.

In 2013, Saberi launched a secondary line called 11 by Boris Bidjan Saberi. This line features more streetwear with a sporty appearance and is generally targeting a lower price point than the products in his main line.

In 2017, he was listed as one of HypeBeast's HB100, their annual list of the most influential creators in the industry.

== Projects ==
Saberi has collaborated with fellow designers such as the eyewear designer Linda Farrow, and the Barcelona-based artisan Miguel Munoz Wilson of 'Munoz Vrandecic.'

In 2014, the brand collaborated with Reebok to create the Instapump Fury for Reebok's 20th anniversary.

In 2016, Saberi Collaborated with Geza Schoen, a Berlin-based perfumer and creator of the Eccentric Molecules line. It is inspired by the scents often found in Saberi's own atelier and has notes of vegetable tanned horse skin, which the brand is known for using in their garments.

In 2017, released a collaboration of eye-wear pieces with Dita. Also, Saberi began an ongoing collaboration with sports equipment manufacturing company Salomon to create shoes for the Boris Bidjan Saberi's 2017 Spring Summer collection and 11 By Boris Bidjan Saberi lines.

In 2018, 11 by Boris Bidjan Saberi collaborated with American artist Phil America for their Spring/Summer 2018 collection.

== Collections ==
- 2007 - Spring/Summer 2008 collection titled "Net" (Barcelona)
- 2008 - Fall/Winter 2008-2009 collection titled "Kefien Liberty" (Paris)
- 2008 - Spring/Summer 2009 collection titled "Desert Storm" (Paris)
- 2009 - Fall/Winter 2009-2010 collection titled “Back Towards“ (Paris)
- 2009 - Spring/Summer 2010 collection titled "Straight Strength" (Paris)
- 2010 - Fall/Winter 2010-2011 collection titled "Primitive Sculpture" (Paris)
- 2010 - Spring/Summer 2011 collection titled "Mechanism" (Paris)
- 2011 - Spring/Summer 2011 collection titled "Kendoism" (Paris)
- 2011 - Fall/Winter 2011 collection titled "Blood" (Paris)
- 2012 - Fall/Winter 2012-2013 collection titled "Glacierism" (Paris)
- 2012 - Spring/Summer 2013 collection titled "Classicism" (Paris)
- 2013 - Fall/Winter 2013-2014 collection titled "Science Fiction" (Paris)
- 2013 - Launch of 11 - by Boris Bidjan Saberi - Fall/Winter 2013-2014 - titled "1" (Paris)
- 2014 - Spring/Summer 2014 collection titled "Sailorism"
- 2014 - Fall/Winter 2014-2015 collection titled "STRUCTURISM"
- 2015 - Spring/Summer 2015 collection titled "SYMBIOSISM"
- 2015 - Fall/Winter 2015-2016 collection titled "HEIMAT"
- 2015 - Spring/Summer 2016 collection titled "SUBSPHERE"
- 2016 - Fall/Winter 2016-2017 collection titled "SQUADRON"
- 2016 - Spring/Summer 2017 collection titled "POST HUMANISM"
- 2017 - Fall/Winter 2017-2018 collection titled "ANCHORISM"
- 2017 - Spring/Summer 2018 collection titled "ARCANISM"
- 2018 - Fall/Winter 2018-2019 collection titled "PAGANISM"
- 2018 - Spring/Summer 2019 collection titled "BRUTALISM"
