= 2023–24 Essex Senior Football League =

The 2023–24 season was the 53rd in the history of the Essex Senior Football League, a football competition in England.

The allocations for Steps 5 and 6 this season were announced by The Football Association on 15 May 2023. Beginning from this season, a four team play-off system was introduced at Step 5 (this league) to guarantee a second promotion place to Step 4, replacing the inter-step play-off. Solely for this season, there was only one club relegated from this league.

The league featured 14 clubs which competed in the division last season, along with six new clubs.

- Promoted from the Eastern Counties League:
  - Frenford
  - Sporting Bengal United
- Relegated from the Isthmian League:
  - Coggeshall Town
  - Great Wakering Rovers
  - Hullbridge Sports
  - Tilbury

== League table ==
Essex Senior Football League
- Season: 2023–24
- Champions: Tilbury
- Promoted: Tilbury; Sporting Bengal United
- Relegated: Coggeshall Town
- Matches: 380
- Goals: 1,306 (3.44 per match)
- Top goalscorer: Kane Gilbert (30 goals)

Pos	Team	Pld	W	D	L	GF	GA	GD	Pts	Promotion, qualification or relegation
1	Tilbury (C, P)	38	27	5	6	79	27	+52	86	Promotion to the Isthmian League
2	Woodford Town	38	23	8	7	85	50	+35	77	Qualification for the play-offs (Note: Four teams play for one spot and promotion to Step 4.)
3	Romford	38	24	5	9	87	53	+34	77	Qualification for the play-offs
4	Barking	38	20	10	8	78	47	+31	70	Qualification for the play-offs
5	Sporting Bengal United (O, P)	38	21	7	10	80	57	+23	70	Qualification for the play-offs
6	Great Wakering Rovers	38	20	7	11	80	47	+33	67	
7	Saffron Walden Town	38	18	7	13	62	57	+5	61	
8	Stanway Rovers	38	18	6	14	73	50	+23	60	
9	Little Oakley	38	15	10	13	66	57	+9	55	
10	Halstead Town	38	15	9	14	73	68	+5	54	
11	Athletic Newham	38	16	4	18	58	59	−1	52	
12	Hullbridge Sports	38	14	7	17	52	58	−6	49	
13	West Essex	38	11	9	18	67	76	−9	42	
14	Buckhurst Hill	38	13	3	22	50	71	−21	42	
15	Takeley	38	9	13	16	59	76	−17	40	
16	White Ensign	38	10	10	18	52	70	−18	40	
17	FC Clacton	38	10	10	18	56	82	−26	40	
18	Frenford	38	9	8	21	52	83	−31	35	
19	Ilford	38	9	5	24	57	112	−55	32	
20	Coggeshall Town (R)	38	4	5	29	40	106	−66	17	Relegation to the Eastern Counties League

Source: Essex Senior League
Rules for classification: 1) Points; 2) Goal difference; 3) Number of goals scored; 4) Number of matches won; 5) Head-to-head results
(C) Champions; (O) Play-off winners; (P) Promoted; (R) Relegated

=== Play-offs ===
Semi-finals
2	Woodford Town	1 (4)
5	Sporting Bengal United	1 (5)
3	Romford	1
4	Barking	0

Final
3	Romford	1
5	Sporting Bengal United	3

==== Semifinals ====
3 May 2024	Romford	1–0	Barking	Corringham
19:45	Newby 45+3'	Report		Stadium: Rookery Hill; Attendance: 195; Referee: Brian Taylor

3 May 2024	Woodford Town	1–1 (a.e.t.) (4–5 p)	Sporting Bengal United	Woodford
19:45	Jewers 44'	Report	Gregory 53'	Stadium: Ashton Playing Fields; Attendance: 200

==== Final ====
6 May 2024	Romford	1–3	Sporting Bengal United	Corringham
15:00		Report		Stadium: Rookery Hill; Attendance: 424; Referee: George Barker

== Stadia and locations ==
Locations of the Essex Senior League clubs
Greater London Essex Senior League football clubs

Club	Location	Stadium	Capacity
Athletic Newham	Plaistow	Terence McMillan Stadium	2,000
Barking	Barking	Mayesbrook Park	2,500
Buckhurst Hill	Buckhurst Hill	Roding Lane	
Coggeshall Town	Coggeshall	West Street	2,000
FC Clacton	Clacton-on-Sea	Austin Arena	3,000 (200 seated)
Frenford	Ilford	The Jack Carter Centre	2,000
Great Wakering Rovers	Great Wakering	Burroughs Park	2,500
White Ensign	Great Wakering	Burroughs Park	2,500
Halstead Town	Halstead	Rosemary Lane	
Hullbridge Sports	Hullbridge	Lower Road	1,500
Ilford	Ilford	Cricklefield Stadium	3,500 (216 seated)
Little Oakley	Little Oakley	Memorial Ground	
Romford	Corringham	Rookery Hill	3,500
Saffron Walden Town	Saffron Walden	Catons Lane	2,000
Sporting Bengal United	Mile End	Mile End Stadium (groundshare with Tower Hamlets)	2,000 (439 seated)
Stanway Rovers	Stanway	Hawthorns	1,500 (100 seated)
Takeley	Takeley	Station Road	2,000
Tilbury	Tilbury	Chadfields	4,000
West Essex	Walthamstow	Wadham Lodge	3,500
Woodford Town	Woodford	Ashton Playing Fields	

== Statistics ==
=== Attendances ===
Team	Average	Highest	Lowest
Halstead Town	270	512 vs Tilbury	122 vs Frenford
Tilbury	196	425 vs Frenford	130 vs Barking
Saffron Walden Town	193	311 vs Romford	91 vs Stanway Rovers
Woodford Town	152	252 vs Buckhurst Hill	69 vs Great Wakering Rovers
Romford	144	424 vs Sporting Bengal United	67 vs Sporting Bengal United
Stanway Rovers	121	197 vs Saffron Walden Town	68 vs Little Oakley
Great Wakering Rovers	112	218 vs Romford	81 vs Halstead Town
West Essex	104	218 vs Little Oakley	53 vs White Ensign
Takeley	100	204 vs Saffron Walden Town	33 vs Romford
FC Clacton	93	171 vs Stanway Rovers	67 vs Buckhurst Hill
Hullbridge Sports	92	190 vs Great Wakering Rovers & Tilbury	51 vs Buckhurst Hill
Ilford	86	220 vs Halstead Town	40 vs Stanway Rovers
Barking	85	154 vs West Essex	47 vs Halstead Town
Little Oakley	83	150 vs FC Clacton	61 vs Ilford
Buckhurst Hill	80	248 vs Woodford Town	43 vs Little Oakley
White Ensign	75	194 vs Great Wakering Rovers	41 vs FC Clacton
Coggeshall Town	70	109 vs White Ensign	41 vs Sporting Bengal United
Frenford	60	125 vs Romford & Woodford Town	36 vs Athletic Newham
Sporting Bengal United	44	90 vs Tilbury	25 vs Stanway Rovers
Athletic Newham	21	65 vs Tilbury	9 vs Little Oakley
