= Billy Knott =

English footballer (born 1992)

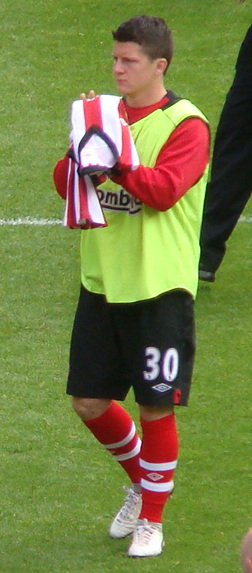
- Knott in 2011.

Personal information
- Full name: Billy Steven Knott
- Date of birth: 28 November 1992 (age 33)
- Place of birth: Canvey Island, England
- Height: 1.73 m (5 ft 8 in)
- Position: Midfielder

Team information
- Current team: Bowers & Pitsea

Youth career
- Concord Rangers
- 2003–2007: West Ham United
- 2007–2010: Chelsea
- 2010–2011: Sunderland

Senior career*
Years	Team	Apps	(Gls)
2011–2014	Sunderland	1	(0)
2012	→ AFC Wimbledon (loan)	20	(3)
2012–2013	→ Woking (loan)	20	(8)
2013–2014	→ Wycombe Wanderers (loan)	17	(1)
2014	→ Port Vale (loan)	18	(2)
2014–2016	Bradford City	64	(3)
2016–2017	Gillingham	17	(1)
2017	→ Lincoln City (loan)	13	(1)
2017–2018	Lincoln City	14	(1)
2018	→ Rochdale (loan)	4	(0)
2018–2019	Concord Rangers	11	(1)
2019–2020	Chelmsford City	26	(0)
2020–2021	Bowers & Pitsea	5	(5)
2020–2021	→ Billericay Town (loan)	7	(0)
2021	Canvey Island	2	(0)
2021–2022	Great Wakering Rovers	3	(0)
2022–2023	Bowers & Pitsea	6	(0)
2022	→ Southend Manor (dual-registration)	6	(0)
2023	Erith Town	1	(0)
2023	Margate	1	(0)
2023–2025	Concord Rangers	36	(1)
2025	Barking	1	(0)
2025	Saffron Walden Town	13	(2)
2025–2026	Hullbridge Sports	14	(3)
2026–	Bowers & Pitsea	3	(0)

International career
2007	England U16	1	(0)
2008	England U17	6	(1)
2011	England U20	4	(0)
- * Club domestic league appearances and goals as of 13:50, 8 November 2026 (UTC)

Billy Steven Knott (born 28 November 1992) is an English footballer who plays as a midfielder for Isthmian League North Division club Bowers & Pitsea.

He has represented England at under-16, under-17 and under-20 level. He joined Sunderland after being released from the Chelsea Academy in 2011. He played one game for the club and spent periods on loan at AFC Wimbledon, Woking, Wycombe Wanderers, and Port Vale. He joined Bradford City in May 2014 and remained with the club for two seasons before he joined Gillingham in June 2016. He joined Lincoln City on loan in January 2017 and joined the club permanently after he helped Lincoln to the 2016–17 National League title. He joined Rochdale on loan in January 2018 before transferring to Concord Rangers in June 2018. He switched to Chelmsford City in March 2019 and joined Bowers & Pitsea in September 2020. He later played for Billericay Town, Canvey Island, Great Wakering Rovers, Southend Manor, Erith Town, Margate, Concord Rangers, Barking, Saffron Walden Town, Hullbridge Sports, and Bowers & Pitsea.

== Club career ==
=== Sunderland ===
Knott joined the Academy at West Ham United at the age of ten before moving with his family to Spain after his mother was diagnosed with lupus. In Spain, West Ham arranged for a trial with Real Madrid, but after the family returned to London, he elected to join the Chelsea Academy rather than rejoin West Ham. He was signed by Premier League club Sunderland after Chelsea released him in the 2010–11 season. He had been dismissed from the Chelsea Academy and forced to sign a confidentiality agreement after a "smoke grenade incident".

Knott joined Terry Brown's League Two side AFC Wimbledon on loan on 11 January 2012, and made his debut in a 2–1 win against Port Vale three days later. He scored his first goal in professional football at Kingsmeadow in a 2–1 win over Macclesfield Town on 24 January. The 19-year-old received the "Dons" Young Player of the Year award, despite only playing half the 2011–12 season, having scored three goals in twenty appearances.

On 8 October 2012, Knott joined Conference Premier side Woking on a one-month loan. He made his debut at Kingfield Stadium in a 2–1 win over Cambridge United the following day. His first goals came for Garry Hill's "Cardinals" came against Luton Town on 1 January 2013, when he scored twice in a 3–1 win. He scored another two goals on 2 February, in a 2–1 win over Hyde. He was awarded the club's Goal of the Season award for his curled effort against Hyde, which was also nominated for the Conference's Goal of the Season competition. Knott scored eight goals in twenty league games, and returned to the Stadium of Light, at the end of Woking's season, after a 2–1 defeat to Tamworth. Manager Paolo Di Canio handed him his Sunderland debut on 19 May 2013, the last day of the 2012–13 Premier League season, coming on as a substitute in a 1–0 defeat to Tottenham Hotspur at White Hart Lane.

Knott joined League Two side Wycombe Wanderers on a one-month youth loan deal on 20 August 2013. He made his Wycombe debut four days later in a 2–2 draw with local-rivals Oxford United, and manager Gareth Ainsworth stated that: "Billy Knott had an immense debut. He has energy, passion, drive, everything that I like in a player, and on top of that he's got Premiership quality with his left foot." He settled into the first-team at Adams Park, and his loan spell was twice extended. On 14 September, he scored his first goal for the "Chairboys", in a 3–0 win over Plymouth Argyle. Sunderland re-called him on 13 January, 16 days before his loan spell was due to end.

On 22 January 2014, Knott joined League One club Port Vale on loan for the remainder of the 2013–14 season. He scored his first goal at Vale Park with a left-footed strike from 25 yards (23 m) on 22 March, in a 3–2 win over Tranmere Rovers. In doing so he boosted his chances of winning a contract from "Valiants" manager Micky Adams when his contract at Sunderland expired in the summer. On 1 April, he scored with a 20-yard strike in a 2–1 home win over Crawley Town that was later voted as the club's goal of the season.

=== Bradford City ===
Knott signed a two-year contract with League One club Bradford City in May 2014 and stated that "[having heard] manager Phil Parkinson's plans to take the club forward, you can't really turn that down." Knott made his debut on 9 August in a 3–2 win against Coventry City at Valley Parade. Knott scored his first goal for the "Bantams" on 19 August in a 3–1 win away to Crawley Town. On 27 August, he scored in a 2–1 win against West Yorkshire rivals Leeds United in the second round of the League Cup. On 24 January, he played the first 80 minutes of City's 4–2 FA Cup giant-killing of Premier League champions Chelsea at Stamford Bridge, which he described as the greatest achievement of his career. After the game, he received a signed shirt from "Blues" captain John Terry, which he passed on to his Chelsea-supporting father. In the next round he helped Bradford beat another Premier League team, as they ran out 2–0 winners over his former club Sunderland. However, he lost his first-team place to Josh Cullen, and was released at the end of the 2015–16 season.

=== Gillingham ===
In June 2016, Knott signed a two-year contract with League One club Gillingham. Manager Justin Edinburgh said he was "a very bright talent". He struggled for form at Priestfield early in the season as he said he was "playing on the left in a diamond... but I would rather play top or bottom of the diamond to get on the ball"; he was then sidelined with a hamstring injury before manager Edinburgh was sacked in favour of Adrian Pennock in January.

=== Lincoln City ===
On 2 February 2017, Knott joined National League side Lincoln City on loan for the remainder of the 2016–17 campaign. On 1 April, he scored the only goal of the game against Bromley at Sincil Bank to send the "Imps" to the top of the table; speaking after the game, manager Danny Cowley said Knott was a "super-talented kid... [who] can be whatever he wants to be". Lincoln achieved promotion back to the English Football League as National League champions with a 2–1 home win over Macclesfield Town on 22 April. He secured his release from Gillingham and signed a one-year deal at Lincoln City in June 2017.

Speaking in September 2017, he stated that his growing maturity was the key to his recent good form. However, he struggled for form after being sent off later in the month. He lost his place in the starting eleven. On 11 January 2018, Knott moved to Rochdale on loan until the end of the 2017–18 season. However, he started just once and made three substitute appearances for Keith Hill's "Dale". Having struggled with depression for years, his tough time at Spotland led him to drink heavily and as a result he contacted the Professional Footballers' Association; speaking in May 2018 he stated that "I know I still have a way to go but I will get through this". Lincoln released him at the end of the 2017–18 season.

=== Concord Rangers ===
On 4 June 2018, following his release from Lincoln, Knott dropped down two tiers to join National League South side Concord Rangers. On the opening day of the 2018–19 campaign, he made his Concord debut during their 2–0 home victory over Gloucester City, featuring for 86 minutes before being replaced by D'sean Theobalds. Just over a month later, he scored his first goal for the club against former side, Woking, netting a late equaliser in the 92nd minute during the 1–1 draw.

=== Chelmsford City ===
On 15 March 2019, Knott signed for fellow Essex-based National League South club Chelmsford City. He made six league appearances to help the "Clarets" to qualify for the play-offs with a fourth-place finish at the end of the 2018–19 season. However, they lost 3–2 to Welling United in the semi-finals. He made 21 appearances during the 2019–20 season, which was ended early due to the COVID-19 pandemic in England. On 3 May 2020, Chelmsford announced Knott's departure from the club; manager Robbie Simpson stated that "Billy is an extremely talented player but he struggled for consistency in terms of fitness last season and therefore I feel we are unable to offer him terms a player of his calibre would expect".

=== Later career ===
On 4 September 2020, Knott signed for Isthmian League Premier Division club Bowers & Pitsea. In November 2020, Knott joined National League South side Billericay Town while the COVID-19 pandemic halted the Isthmian League season. He played seven times for "Ricay" before the 2020–21 National League South season was also curtailed.

On 11 August 2021, Knott signed for Isthmian League North Division side Canvey Island. On 31 December 2021, Knott signed for Isthmian League North Division rivals Great Wakering Rovers, after having featured just twice in the league for the "Gulls". After three appearances for Great Wakering, Knott re-signed for Bowers & Pitsea ahead of the 2022–23 season. In October 2022, Knott signed for Essex Senior League club Southend Manor on a dual-registration deal.

In January 2023, he joined Isthmian League Premier Division side Margate, after a one-game spell at Southern Counties East League Premier Division club Erith Town. He played three games in all competitions for Margate. Ahead of the 2023–24 season, Knott re-signed for Concord Rangers and went on to feature on 21 occasions as the club were relegated from the Isthmian League Premier Division. In January 2025, Knott made a single appearance for Barking, before signing for fellow Essex Senior League side Saffron Walden. He scored two goals in twelve games in the remainder of the 2024–25 season. He joined Hullbridge Sports in July 2025. He scored three goals in 16 games during the 2025–26 season. He played for Bowers & Pitsea of the Isthmian League North Division in the 2026–27 campaign.

== International career ==
Knott has represented England at under-16, under-17 and under-20 level. He scored for the under-17s in a 7–0 win over Estonia in a qualifier for the 2009 UEFA European Under-17 Championship on 24 October 2008. Brian Eastick selected Knott and Sunderland teammate Blair Adams in the 21 man squad for the 2011 FIFA U-20 World Cup in Colombia.

== Style of play ==
Knott is a left-footed midfielder with a 'high-intensity, high-energy' playing style. He prefers to play as an attacking midfielder, but can also play on the left side of midfield.

== Career statistics ==
As of match played 7 November 2026

Appearances and goals by club, season and competition
Club	Season	League			FA Cup		EFL Cup		Other		Total	
Club	Season	Division	Apps	Goals	Apps	Goals	Apps	Goals	Apps	Goals	Apps	Goals
Sunderland	2010–11	Premier League	0	0	0	0	0	0	—		0	0
Sunderland	2011–12	Premier League	0	0	0	0	0	0	—		0	0
Sunderland	2012–13	Premier League	1	0	0	0	0	0	—		1	0
Sunderland	2013–14	Premier League	0	0	0	0	0	0	—		0	0
Sunderland	Total		1	0	0	0	0	0	—		1	0
AFC Wimbledon (loan)	2011–12	League Two	20	3	—		—		—		20	3
Woking (loan)	2012–13	Conference Premier	20	8	0	0	—		2 (Note: Appearance(s) in FA Trophy)	2	22	10
Wycombe Wanderers (loan)	2013–14	League Two	17	1	3	0	—		3 (Note: Appearance(s) in Football League Trophy)	1	23	2
Port Vale (loan)	2013–14	League One	18	2	—		—		—		18	2
Bradford City	2014–15	League One	40	3	8	3	3	1	0	0	51	7
Bradford City	2015–16	League One	24	0	3	0	0	0	1	1	28	1
Bradford City	Total		64	3	11	3	3	1	1	1	79	8
Gillingham	2016–17	EFL League One	17	1	2	0	3	0	2 (Note: Appearance(s) in EFL Trophy)	0	24	1
Lincoln City (loan)	2016–17	National League	13	1	—		—		0	0	13	1
Lincoln City	2017–18	EFL League Two	14	1	2	0	1	1	4	0	21	2
Lincoln City	Total		27	2	2	0	1	1	4	0	34	3
Rochdale (loan)	2017–18	EFL League One	4	0	0	0	—		—		4	0
Concord Rangers	2018–19	National League South	11	1	0	0	—		0	0	11	1
Chelmsford City	2018–19	National League South	6	0	0	0	—		1 (Note: Appearance(s) in play-offs)	0	7	0
Chelmsford City	2019–20	National League South	20	0	0	0	—		1	1	21	1
Chelmsford City	Total		26	0	0	0	0	0	2	1	28	1
Bowers & Pitsea	2020–21	Isthmian League; Premier Division	5	5	2	2	—		1	0	8	7
Billericay Town (loan)	2020–21	National League South	7	0	0	0	—		0	0	7	0
Canvey Island	2021–22	Isthmian League; North Division	2	0	1	0	—		0	0	3	0
Great Wakering Rovers	2021–22	Isthmian League; North Division	3	0	0	0	—		0	0	3	0
Bowers & Pitsea	2022–23	Isthmian League; Premier Division	6	0	0	0	—		0	0	6	0
Southend Manor	2022–23	Essex Senior League	6	0	0	0	—		0	0	6	0
Erith Town	2023–24	Southern Counties East; Premier Division	1	0	0	0	—		0	0	1	0
Margate	2022–23	Isthmian League; Premier Division	1	0	0	0	—		2 (Note: 1 appearance in the Alan Turvey Trophy and 1 appearance in the Kent Senior Cup)	0	3	0
Concord Rangers	2023–24	Isthmian League; Premier Division	17	0	2	0	—		2 (Note: 1 appearance in Alan Turvey Trophy and 1 appearance in Essex Senior Cup)	0	21	0
Concord Rangers	2024–25	Isthmian League; North Division	19	1	1	0	—		2 (Note: 1 appearance in FA Trophy and 1 appearance in Essex Senior Cup)	0	22	1
Concord Rangers	Total		36	1	3	0	0	0	4	0	43	1
Barking	2024–25	Essex Senior League	1	0	0	0	—		0	0	1	0
Saffron Walden	2024–25	Essex Senior League	12	2	0	0	—		0	0	12	2
Saffron Walden	2025–26	Essex Senior League	1	0	0	0	—		0	0	1	0
Saffron Walden	Total		13	2	0	0	0	0	0	0	13	2
Hullbridge Sports	2025–26	Essex Senior League	14	3	1	0	—		1 (Note: Appearance(s) in FA Vase)	0	16	3
Bowers & Pitsea	2026–27	Isthmian League; North Division	2	0	0	0	—		1 (Note: Appearance(s) in Alan Turvey Trophy)	0	3	0
Career total			322	32	25	5	7	2	23	5	377	44

== Honours ==
Lincoln City

- National League: 2016–17
