= 2022–23 Essex Senior Football League =

The 2022–23 season was the 52nd in the history of the Essex Senior Football League, a football competition in England.

The proposed constitution for this season was published on 15 May 2022, based on allocations for Steps 5 and 6 announced by the FA three days earlier, and was subject to appeals.

The league featured 16 clubs which competed in the division last season, along with four new clubs.

- Promoted from the Eastern Counties League:
  - Buckhurst Hill
  - Halstead Town
- Relegated from the Isthmian League:
  - Barking
  - Romford

Enfield were champions, winning second Essex Senior League title and were promoted to the Isthmian League for the first time as a reformed club. Runners-up Redbridge won interstep playoff and also were promoted after seven seasons in the Essex Senior League.

== League table ==
Essex Senior Football League
- Season: 2022–23
- Champions: Enfield
- Promoted: Enfield; Redbridge
- Relegated: Clapton; Southend Manor
- Matches: 380
- Goals: 1,309 (3.44 per match)
- Top goalscorer: Hassan Nalbant (29 goals)

Pos	Team	Pld	W	D	L	GF	GA	GD	Pts	Promotion, qualification or relegation
1	Enfield	38	30	2	6	114	36	+78	92	Promoted to the Isthmian League
2	Redbridge	38	27	6	5	82	33	+49	87	Qualified for an inter-step play-off, then promoted to the Isthmian League
3	Woodford Town	38	23	7	8	86	48	+38	76	
4	FC Clacton	38	23	4	11	76	59	+17	73	
5	Takeley	38	21	4	13	78	48	+30	67	
6	Athletic Newham	38	19	9	10	75	47	+28	66	
7	Barking	38	19	8	11	79	62	+17	65	
8	Stansted	38	17	9	12	65	47	+18	60	Transferred to the Spartan South Midlands League
9	Saffron Walden Town	38	19	4	15	78	65	+13	61	
10	West Essex	38	18	5	15	70	48	+22	59	
11	Stanway Rovers	38	16	4	18	60	61	−1	52	
12	Little Oakley	38	15	7	16	57	66	−9	52	
13	White Ensign	38	14	7	17	60	83	−23	49	
14	Romford	38	14	5	19	72	69	+3	47	
15	Halstead Town	38	11	7	20	54	72	−18	40	
16	Ilford	38	12	4	22	51	76	−25	40	
17	Buckhurst Hill	38	11	6	21	61	70	−9	39	
18	Sawbridgeworth Town	38	7	8	23	36	83	−47	29	Transferred to the Spartan South Midlands League
19	Clapton	38	5	4	29	34	114	−80	19	Relegated to the Eastern Counties League
20	Southend Manor	38	2	4	32	21	122	−101	7 (Note: Southend Manor were deducted three points for fielding an ineligible player.)	Relegated to the Eastern Counties League

Source: Essex Senior League
Rules for classification: 1) Points; 2) Goal difference; 3) Number of goals scored; 4) Number of matches won; 5) Head-to-head results

=== Inter-step play-off ===
29 April 2023	Haywards Heath Town	2–3	Redbridge	Haywards Heath
15:00	Pingling 13'; Laing 33' (pen.)		Cobblah 49', 71'; Ogunwomoju 81'	Stadium: Hanbury Park; Attendance: 631

== Stadia and locations ==
Locations of the Essex Senior League clubs
Greater London Essex Senior League football clubs

Club	Location	Stadium	Capacity
Athletic Newham	Plaistow	Terence McMillan Stadium	2,000
Clapton	Plaistow	Terence McMillan Stadium	2,000
Barking	Barking	Mayesbrook Park	2,500
Romford	Barking	Mayesbrook Park	2,500
Buckhurst Hill	Buckhurst Hill	Roding Lane	
Enfield	Bishop's Stortford	Woodside Park (groundshare with Bishop's Stortford)	4,525 (525 seated)
FC Clacton	Clacton-on-Sea	Austin Arena	3,000 (200 seated)
Halstead Town	Halstead	Rosemary Lane	
Ilford	Ilford	Cricklefield Stadium	3,500 (216 seated)
Little Oakley	Little Oakley	Memorial Ground	
Redbridge	Barkingside	Oakside Stadium	3,000 (316 seated)
Saffron Walden Town	Saffron Walden	Catons Lane	2,000
Sawbridgeworth Town	Sawbridgeworth	Crofters End	2,500 (175 seated)
Southend Manor	Southend-on-Sea	Southchurch Park	2,000 (500 seated)
Stansted	Stansted Mountfitchet	Hargrave Park	2,000 (200 seated)
Stanway Rovers	Stanway	Hawthorns	1,500 (100 seated)
Takeley	Takeley	Station Road	2,000
West Essex	Walthamstow	Wadham Lodge	3,500
White Ensign	Great Wakering	Burroughs Park (groundshare with Great Wakering Rovers)	3,000 (250 seated)
Woodford Town	Woodford	Ashton Playing Fields	

== Statistics ==
Team	Average	Highest	Lowest
Saffron Walden Town	298	552 vs Athletic Newham	98 vs Romford
Halstead Town	201	425 vs Romford & Saffron Walden Town	143 vs Athletic Newham
Enfield	186	303 vs White Ensign	106 vs Clapton
Woodford Town	157	298 vs Buckhurst Hill	89 vs Southend Manor & West Essex
Buckhurst Hill	119	206 vs Woodford Town	70 vs Athletic Newham
Stansted	113	281 vs Saffron Walden Town	61 vs Athletic Newham
Sawbridgeworth Town	92	269 vs Woodford Town	30 vs Clapton
Romford	91	133 vs Barking	63 vs Clapton
West Essex	87	212 vs Southend Manor	22 vs Athletic Newham
Ilford	85	210 vs Saffron Walden Town	60 vs Sawbridgeworth Town & Southend Manor
Little Oakley	83	153 vs FC Clacton	54 vs West Essex
Takeley	82	150 vs Saffron Walden Town	29 vs Clapton
Barking	71	127 vs Romford	48 vs Ilford
Stanway Rovers	68	175 vs Redbridge	52 vs White Ensign
Redbridge	47	96 vs Romford	38 vs Athletic Newham
Southend Manor	37	142 vs White Ensign	31 vs Ilford
White Ensign	35	185 vs Southend Manor	47 vs Buckhurst Hill
Clapton	29	67 vs Romford	14 vs Southend Manor
Athletic Newham	13	32 vs Saffron Walden Town	7 vs White Ensign
