= 2024–25 Essex Senior Football League =

The 2024–25 season is the 54th in the history of the Essex Senior Football League, a football competition in England.

The allocations for Steps 5 and 6 this season were announced by The Football Association on 17 May 2024. Solely for this season, there were no relegations from Step 4 into the league.

The league featured 17 clubs which competed in the division last season, along with three new clubs.

- Promoted from the Eastern Counties League:
  - Benfleet
- Transferred from the South Spartan Midlands League:
  - Sawbridgeworth Town
  - Stansted

Tilbury were champions with Sporting Bengal United winning the playoffs. Both were promoted to the Isthmian League. Coggeshall Town finished bottom of the league and were relegated to the Eastern Counties Football League.

== League table ==
Essex Senior Football League
- Season: 2024–25
- Dates: 27 July 2024 - 26 April 2025
- Champions: Stanway Rovers
- Promoted: Stanway Rovers; Takeley
- Relegated: Stansted; FC Clacton
- Matches: 380
- Goals: 1,314 (3.46 per match)
- Top goalscorer: George Okoye (24 goals)
- Biggest home win: Stanway Rovers 8–0 FC Clacton (2 November 2024)
- Biggest away win: Athletic Newham 1–8 Woodford Town (1 February 2025)
- Highest scoring: Sawbridgeworth Town 4–7 Stanway Rovers (24 August 2024)
- Longest winning run: 14 matches Stanway Rovers (25 January 2025 - 19 Apr 2025)
- Longest unbeaten run: 25 matches Stanway Rovers (30 July 2024 - 8 February 2025)
- Longest winless run: 13 matches FC Clacton (5 October 2024 - 21 January 2025)
- Longest losing run: 8 matches Stansted (26 October 2024 - 25 January 2025)
- Highest attendance: 1,003; Takeley 2–0 Woodford Town (play-off final; 3 May 2025)
- Lowest attendance: 12; Athletic Newham 0–3 Benfleet (15 March 2025)
- Total attendance: 46,834
- Average attendance: 123

Pos	Team	Pld	W	D	L	GF	GA	GD	Pts	Promotion, qualification or relegation
1	Stanway Rovers (C, P)	38	28	7	3	102	39	+63	91	Promotion to the Isthmian League
2	Takeley (O, P)	38	28	5	5	82	35	+47	89	Qualification for the play-offs (Note: Four teams play for one spot and promotion to Step 4.)
3	Woodford Town	38	25	7	6	82	29	+53	82	Qualification for the play-offs
4	Great Wakering Rovers	38	23	6	9	76	37	+39	75	Qualification for the play-offs
5	Barking	38	23	6	9	83	53	+30	75	Qualification for the play-offs
6	Saffron Walden Town	38	19	7	12	80	57	+23	64	
7	Little Oakley	38	16	10	12	63	52	+11	58	
8	White Ensign	38	17	6	15	65	54	+11	57	
9	Buckhurst Hill	38	15	8	15	64	61	+3	53	
10	Athletic Newham	38	14	6	18	66	70	−4	48	
11	Romford	38	14	6	18	60	64	−4	48	
12	West Essex	38	13	9	16	54	62	−8	48	
13	Halstead Town	38	15	3	20	74	101	−27	48	
14	Frenford	38	12	6	20	58	71	−13	42	
15	Ilford	38	11	9	18	49	64	−15	42	
16	Benfleet	38	12	4	22	66	81	−15	40	
17	Sawbridgeworth Town	38	10	6	22	57	100	−43	36	Transfer to the Spartan South Midlands League
18	Hullbridge Sports	38	10	5	23	57	84	−27	35	
19	Stansted (R)	38	6	9	23	35	80	−45	27	Relegation to the Eastern Counties League
20	FC Clacton (R)	38	4	5	29	41	120	−79	17	Relegation to the Eastern Counties League

Source: Essex Senior League
Rules for classification: 1) Points; 2) Goal difference; 3) Number of goals scored; 4) Number of matches won; 5) Head-to-head results
(C) Champions; (O) Play-off winners; (P) Promoted; (R) Relegated

=== Results table ===
Home \ Away	ATN	BAR	BEN	BUC	FCC	FRE	GWR	HAL	HUL	ILF	LOA	ROM	SAF	SAW	STN	STR	TAK	WSX	WHI	WOD
Athletic Newham	—	3–4	0–3	2–3	1–1	3–2	2–3	3–3	3–2	4–1	4–0	4–1	1–2	2–1	1–0	0–0	1–2	2–2	1–2	1–8
Barking	1–0	—	5–2	2–4	5–3	0–2	2–3	4–3	1–0	2–2	2–1	3–1	3–1	3–2	0–0	1–1	2–1	1–0	3–2	1–2
Benfleet	3–0	0–5	—	1–0	4–2	1–3	2–0	3–2	2–3	6–3	2–1	3–3	3–3	2–3	1–3	0–2	2–3	0–2	3–2	0–1
Buckhurst Hill	2–3	2–1	3–3	—	0–1	2–0	0–3	2–4	1–1	2–2	2–2	3–0	0–2	3–3	4–0	1–2	2–1	2–3	1–0	2–1
FC Clacton	1–4	0–3	0–5	0–4	—	0–4	0–4	2–3	2–3	0–1	1–4	3–0	2–3	3–0	1–1	1–5	1–3	0–3	0–2	0–1
Frenford	1–2	1–3	1–2	2–3	2–1	—	0–4	3–3	4–1	1–1	1–2	2–4	2–4	2–0	1–1	1–3	1–3	2–2	2–4	3–2
Great Wakering Rovers	3–1	0–2	0–0	2–1	5–0	1–0	—	5–1	1–2	1–0	1–0	2–0	1–1	6–1	5–0	0–1	0–0	1–0	3–1	0–0
Halstead Town	0–4	2–5	2–1	0–1	6–3	3–1	0–3	—	2–4	3–1	3–2	2–1	2–1	1–3	4–3	1–3	0–6	1–2	3–1	0–4
Hullbridge Sports	1–6	1–4	3–1	1–0	1–3	0–1	2–3	3–2	—	1–2	0–1	3–3	0–5	3–3	5–0	0–3	2–3	4–1	0–1	1–3
Ilford	1–1	2–2	2–1	1–1	2–1	2–3	2–0	3–1	1–0	—	0–3	1–3	0–1	3–4	3–1	1–2	1–3	2–1	1–2	0–2
Little Oakley	2–0	1–1	5–1	2–1	2–2	0–1	2–4	1–0	1–0	1–1	—	0–1	4–1	3–0	1–1	1–2	2–0	3–3	2–1	3–1
Romford	1–1	1–3	2–0	1–3	5–0	1–3	0–1	1–2	1–2	1–1	1–2	—	2–1	5–1	3–0	4–1	3–1	1–0	1–3	0–3
Saffron Walden Town	0–1	2–1	3–2	0–1	3–0	1–1	1–1	7–0	3–1	3–0	2–4	1–3	—	4–1	2–1	1–3	1–1	3–1	1–3	0–0
Sawbridgeworth Town	2–4	0–2	1–4	0–2	3–3	1–0	1–2	2–5	2–1	1–0	3–3	2–0	1–1	—	1–1	4–7	0–6	3–2	1–3	0–2
Stansted	2–1	0–1	2–0	2–1	5–1	2–1	1–1	0–1	1–1	0–2	0–0	1–2	2–6	0–2	—	0–2	0–1	3–3	0–1	0–4
Stanway Rovers	2–0	1–3	2–0	5–0	8–0	4–0	3–1	2–1	5–3	1–0	2–2	1–1	5–3	3–1	2–0	—	3–3	8–1	1–0	0–0
Takeley	1–0	3–1	1–0	2–1	3–1	2–1	3–2	6–3	2–1	1–0	4–0	0–0	1–0	2–1	4–1	1–0	—	1–0	3–1	2–0
West Essex	3–0	1–0	3–2	2–0	3–0	1–1	0–2	2–1	0–0	1–3	1–0	1–3	1–2	3–0	2–1	2–4	0–0	—	2–2	0–1
White Ensign	3–0	2–0	1–0	2–2	7–0	0–1	2–1	1–1	3–1	0–0	0–0	3–0	1–4	1–2	7–0	0–2	0–2	0–0	—	1–4
Woodford Town	1–0	1–1	4–1	2–2	2–2	2–1	3–1	2–3	4–0	3–1	2–0	1–0	0–1	3–1	2–0	1–1	1–0	3–0	6–0	—

Source: FA Full-Time Grid
Legend: Blue = home team win; Yellow = draw; Red = away team win.
For upcoming matches, an "a" indicates there is an article about the rivalry between the two participants.

=== Play-offs ===
Semi-finals
2	Takeley	2
5	Barking	0
3	Woodford Town	2
4	Great Wakering Rovers	1

Final
2	Takeley	2
3	Woodford Town	0

==== Semifinals ====
30 April	Takeley	2–0	Barking	Takeley
19:45 GMT	Powell 36'; Miles 81'	Report		Stadium: Station Road; Attendance: 430

30 April	Woodford Town	2–1	Great Wakering Rovers	Woodford
19:45 GMT	Okoh 90+2', 90+6'	Report	Talbot 75' (pen.)	Stadium: Ashton Playing Fields; Attendance: 421

==== Final ====
3 May	Takeley	2–0	Woodford Town	Takeley
15:00	Unknown (o.g.); Clarke 83'			Stadium: Station Road; Attendance: 1,003; Referee: Brian Taylor

== Stadium and locations ==
Locations of the Essex Senior League clubs
Greater London Essex Senior League football clubs

Club	Location	Stadium	Capacity
Athletic Newham	Dagenham	Parsoles Park HUB	1,500
Barking	Barking	Mayesbrook Park	2,500
Benfleet	South Benfleet	Woodside Stadium	4,100
Buckhurst Hill	Buckhurst Hill	Roding Lane	1,500
FC Clacton	Clacton-on-Sea	Rush Green Bowl	3,000 (200 seated)
Frenford	Ilford	The Jack Carter Centre	2,000
Great Wakering Rovers	Great Wakering	Burroughs Park	2,500
Halstead Town	Halstead	Rosemary Lane	1,500
Hullbridge Sports	Hullbridge	Lower Road	1,500
Ilford	Ilford	Cricklefield Stadium	3,500 (216 seated)
Little Oakley	Little Oakley	Memorial Ground	500
Romford	Barking	Mayesbrook Park (groundshare with Barking)	2,500
Saffron Walden Town	Saffron Walden	Catons Lane	2,000
Sawbridgeworth Town	Sawbridgeworth	Crofters End	2,500
Stansted	Stansted Mountfitchet	Hargrave Park	2,000
Stanway Rovers	Stanway	Hawthorns	1,500 (100 seated)
Takeley	Takeley	Station Road	2,000
West Essex	Walthamstow	Wadham Lodge (groundshare with Walthamstow)	3,500
White Ensign	Great Wakering	Burroughs Park (groundshare with Great Wakering Rovers)	2,500
Woodford Town	Woodford	Ashton Playing Fields	3,000

== Statistics ==
=== Appearances ===
Rank	Player	Team	Appearances
1.	George Martin	Great Wakering Rovers	39
2.	Jordan Wescott	Takeley	38
3.	Lewis Edwards	West Essex	37
4.	George Okoye	Stanway Rovers	37
5.	Dean Ager	Halstead Town	36

=== Top scorers ===
Rank	Players	Goals Scored	Team
1.	George Okoye	24	Stanway Rovers
2.	Sam Shaban	23	Barking
3.	Harry Talbot	22	Great Wakering Rovers
4.	Leonardo Pedro	19	Athletic Newham
5.	Juwon Akintunde	18	Barking

=== Hat tricks ===
Player	For	Result	Date
Max Jobson	Benfleet	Benfleet 6–3 Ilford	30 July 2024
Ellis Devereux	White Ensign	Frenford 2–4 White Ensign	30 July 2024
Charlie Morris	Hullbridge Sports	Halstead Town 2–4 Hullbridge Sports	30 July 2024
Jamie Obama Nvumba	Athletic Newham	Hullbridge Sports 1–6 Athletic Newham	10 August 2024
Harry Brown	Great Wakering Rovers	Little Oakley 2–4 Great Wakering Rovers	3 September 2024
Harry Brown	Great Wakering Rovers	Great Wakering Rovers 3–1 Athletic Newham	10 September 2024
Chinedu Duru	White Ensign	White Ensign 7–0 Stansted	12 October 2024
Suley Zhudu	Buckhurst Hill	Barking 2–4 Buckhurst Hill	25 October 2024
Callum Boylan	Great Wakering Rovers	Great Wakering Rovers 5–0 FC Clactron	26 December 2024
Olly Miles	Takeley	Takeley 4–1 Stansted	18 January 2025
Daniel Rowe	Little Oakley	Little Oakley 4–1 Saffron Walden Town	4 February 2025
Elijah Grant	Sawbridgeworth Town	Ilford 3–4 Sawbridgeworth Town	8 February 2025
Harry Talbot	Great Wakering Rovers	FC Clacton 0–4 Great Wakering Rovers	1 March 2025
Daniel Rowe	Little Oakley	Ilford 0–3 Little Oakley	1 March 2025
Sam Shaban	Barking	Benfleet 0–5 Barking	4 March 2025
Sam Shaban	Barking	Romford 1–3 Barking	11 April 2025
Max Brownsdon	Little Oakley	Little Oakley 5–1 Benfleet	22 April 2025

=== Attendances ===
Team	Average	Highest	Lowest
Halstead Town	263	615 vs Frenford	143 vs Saffron Walden Town
Benfleet	231	702 vs FC Clacton	112 vs Barking & West Essex
Saffron Walden Town	224	375 vs Stansted	89 vs West Essex
Takeley	191	1,003 vs Woodford Town	71 vs Hullbridge Sports
Woodford Town	160	431 vs Great Wakering Rovers	78 vs Halstead Town & Stansted
Stanway Rovers	141	419 vs Halstead Town	75 vs White Ensign
Hullbridge Sports	140	264 vs Great Wakering Rovers	70 vs FC Clacton
Romford	125	204 vs Great Wakering Rovers	91 vs Ilford
Great Wakering Rovers	120	166 vs White Ensign	68 vs Little Oakley
Stansted	111	262 vs Saffron Walden Town	65 vs Stanway Rovers
West Essex	108	212 vs Barking	53 vs Stanway Rovers
Buckhurst Hill	98	411 vs Hullbridge Sports	52 vs Stansted
FC Clacton	87	154 vs Little Oakley	52 vs Stansted
Barking	81	192 vs Buckhurst Hill	49 vs Benfleet
White Ensign	75	122 vs Hullbridge Sports	41 vs Ilford
Little Oakley	72	111 vs Stanway Rovers	49 vs Woodford Town
Ilford	67	101 vs Romford	43 vs Halstead Town
Frenford	57	75 vs West Essex	34 vs Stanway Rovers
Sawbridgeworth Town	56	100 vs Takeley	30 vs Benfleet
Athletic Newham	42	75 vs Buckhurst Hill	12 vs Benfleet

== Overall season review ==
Stanway Rovers have been promoted to the Isthmian League North Division after finishing the season on 91 points, joining them in Step 4 will be Takeley who had a successful Play-off campaign by beating Barking 2-0 in the Semi-Final and beating Woodford Town 2-0 in the final at home. Replacing them will be Basildon United and Sporting Bengal United after a dreadful season for both of them. At the other end of the table Stansted have been relegated to the Eastern Counties League Division One South and F.C. Clacton have gone to the Division One North, replacing them will be Harwich & Parkeston who won the Division One North Play-offs and Hackney Wick who won the Division One South Play-offs, Sawbridgeworth Town who have been transferred to the Spartan South Midlands League Premier Division so Soul Tower Hamlets have replaced them. The Golden Boot award goes to George Okoye who netted 24 for the Champions. The Highest Attended game this season was the Play-off Final which had 1,003 people, The least attended game was Athletic Newham vs Benfleet at the Bobby Moore Sports Hub with just 12 attendees. In the Peter Butcher Memorial Trophy Great Wakering Rovers beat Little Oakley 1-0 at Billericay Town's New Lodge on the 26 March 2025, In the Errington Challenge Cup Great Wakering Rovers beat Little Oakley again but this time on penalties at Witham Town's Simarco Stadium on the 5 May 2025.
