= 2025–26 Essex Senior Football League =

English football league season

Essex Senior Football League
- Season: 2025–26
- Dates: 25 July 2025 – 25 April 2026
- Champions: Little Oakley
- Promoted: Little Oakley; Buckhurst Hill
- Relegated: Athletic Newham
- Matches: 380
- Goals: 1,324 (3.48 per match)
- Top goalscorer: Kaleel Green (27 goals)
- Highest attendance: 1,044; Buckhurst Hill 1–0 Barking (22 November 2025)
- Lowest attendance: 17; Sporting Bengal United 1–3 Halstead Town (14 February 2026)
- All statistics correct as of 17-05-26 (13:50).

The 2025–26 Essex Senior League season is the 55th edition of the football competition. The allocations were announced from The Football Association on 15 May 2025 and the fixtures were released on 22 July 2025.

== Team changes ==
=== To the Essex Senior League ===
Promoted from the Eastern Counties Football League Division One North

- Harwich & Parkeston

Promoted from the Eastern Counties Football League Division One South

- Hackney Wick

Promoted from the Southern Counties East Football League Division One

- Soul Tower Hamlets

Relegated from the Isthmian League North Division

- Basildon United
- Sporting Bengal United

=== From the Essex Senior League ===
Promoted to the Isthmian League North Division

- Stanway Rovers
- Takeley

Relegated to the Eastern Counties Football League Division One North

- FC Clacton

Relegated to the Eastern Counties Football League Division One South

- Stansted

Transferred to the Spartan South Midlands Football League Premier Division

- Sawbridgeworth Town

==== About team changes ====
Basildon United were relegated from the Isthmian North on 27 points, it is their first season in the division since 2017–18 when they won promotion. Sporting Bengal United who were also relegated from the Isthmian North finishing on 25 points, it is their first season in the division since 2023-24 after they won promotion beating Romford in the play-off final. Harwich & Parkeston won promotion to the division after winning the Thurlow Nunn League Division One North Play offs, it is their first ever season at Step 5. The same goes for Hackney Wick who were promoted via the play offs of the division one north, although have been in the division before, last season being in 2017-18 before being relegated. Soul Tower Hamlets were promoted from Step 6 after winning the league, they have been in the division before but under Tower Hamlets and Bethnal Green United, their last season was in the 2019-20 season.

Stanway Rovers won the league and have been promoted to the Isthmian North, it is the clubs first ever season at Step 4, the same can be said for play-off winners Takeley who have also never been at Step 4. Clacton Town were relegated from the division and will be their first at Step 6 since the 2020-21 season. It is Stansted's first season at step 6 since the 1970-71 season.

== League table ==
Pos	Team	Pld	W	D	L	GF	GA	GD	Pts	Promotion, qualification or relegation
1	Little Oakley (C, P)	38	25	7	6	75	32	+43	82	Promotion to the Isthmian League North Division
2	Soul Tower Hamlets	38	24	8	6	91	48	+43	80	Qualification for the play-offs
3	Great Wakering Rovers	38	23	8	7	90	45	+45	77	Qualification for the play-offs
4	Buckhurst Hill (O, P)	38	24	5	9	85	42	+43	77	Qualification for the play-offs
5	Barking	38	22	6	10	97	50	+47	72	Qualification for the play-offs
6	Ilford	38	19	11	8	70	46	+24	68	
7	Saffron Walden Town	38	18	11	9	92	58	+34	65	
8	Benfleet	38	16	10	12	68	61	+7	58	
9	Halstead Town	38	17	7	14	68	63	+5	58	
10	Hullbridge Sports	38	16	5	17	67	65	+2	53	
11	Woodford Town	38	15	6	17	65	68	−3	51	
12	Hackney Wick	38	14	3	21	59	93	−34	45	
13	Harwich & Parkeston	38	11	7	20	47	78	−31	40	
14	Romford	38	9	9	20	53	86	−33	36	
15	Basildon United	38	10	5	23	44	79	−35	35	
16	White Ensign	38	9	7	22	57	79	−22	34	
17	Sporting Bengal United	38	10	7	21	50	80	−30	34	
18	West Essex	38	8	10	20	48	79	−31	34	
19	Frenford	38	9	6	23	41	81	−40	33	Reprieved from relegation
20	Athletic Newham (R)	38	8	8	22	57	91	−34	32	Relegation to the Eastern Counties League Division One South

Source: Essex Senior League
Rules for classification: 1) Points; 2) Goal difference; 3) Number of goals scored; 4) Number of matches won; 5) Head-to-head results
(C) Champions; (O) Play-off winners; (P) Promoted; (R) Relegated

=== Play-offs ===
Semi-finals
2	Soul Tower Hamlets	1
5	Barking	2
3	Great Wakering Rovers	1 (1)
4	Buckhurst Hill	1 (3)

Final
4	Buckhurst Hill	1
5	Barking	0

==== Semifinals ====
28 April 2026	Soul Tower Hamlets	1–2	Barking	Mile End
15:00 GMT	Bihmoutine 34'	Report	Folkes 67'; Pickles 90+1'	Stadium: Mile End Stadium; Attendance: 73; Referee: Joe Wise

28 April 2026	Great Wakering Rovers	1–1 (1–3 p)	Buckhurst Hill	Great Wakering
15:00 GMT	Barton 18'	Report	Lusher 40'	Stadium: Burroughs Park; Attendance: 375; Referee: Adekola Adeyemi

==== Final ====
2 May 2026	Buckhurst Hill	1–0	Barking	Buckhurst Hill
15:00	Massingham 82'	Report		Stadium: Roding Lane; Attendance: 1,044; Referee: Tommy Fleming

== Results table ==
Home \ Away	ATN	BAR	BAS	BEN	BUC	FRE	GWR	HAC	HAL	H&P	HUL	ILF	LOA	ROM	SWT	STH	SBU	WSX	WHI	WOD
Athletic Newham	—	3–4	0–3	4–1	1–2	3–2	1–1	3–2	1–6	1–2	2–6	1–1	1–1	2–0	0–5	2–3	2–4	0–2	1–4	3–3
Barking	3–0	—	1–0	4–2	4–1	4–1	2–1	7–0	2–0	3–0	4–0	2–2	4–1	1–3	3–3	1–2	4–1	3–0	5–0	0–2
Basildon United	0–3	0–2	—	3–0	1–3	1–2	0–5	1–4	2–2	2–1	1–3	1–3	0–1	3–2	3–2	2–2	2–5	0–0	3–2	0–3
Benfleet	1–0	2–0	4–0	—	1–2	1–0	0–2	5–0	1–3	1–1	3–2	1–1	2–1	5–0	0–0	2–1	3–0	1–1	1–1	1–1
Buckhurst Hill	2–1	2–0	2–0	4–1	—	4–1	3–4	5–0	2–1	2–0	0–2	3–1	1–1	1–4	4–1	2–2	3–3	3–0	1–0	3–0
Frenford	1–0	2–4	1–2	2–5	1–0	—	1–0	2–1	3–0	0–1	0–8	1–3	0–0	2–0	0–2	1–2	0–1	2–0	0–2	2–2
Great Wakering Rovers	3–0	1–1	2–1	2–3	1–1	1–0	—	2–2	3–0	3–1	2–1	2–1	0–0	2–2	6–1	4–0	5–0	4–1	3–2	2–1
Hackney Wick	3–1	1–3	0–2	0–2	2–1	4–1	2–3	—	1–3	5–1	1–5	0–2	0–4	1–1	0–3	1–2	0–2	2–1	2–1	2–3
Halstead Town	1–1	2–0	2–0	3–3	2–1	4–2	2–0	2–1	—	2–0	1–0	1–3	2–3	1–1	3–1	2–4	1–1	0–3	2–1	1–1
Harwich & Parkeston	1–1	3–3	1–2	5–2	1–5	1–1	0–4	1–2	2–1	—	2–1	1–2	0–3	1–0	0–1	0–1	1–1	1–0	3–3	3–1
Hullbridge Sports	1–5	4–2	0–2	4–1	1–1	4–2	1–1	1–2	3–2	4–3	—	0–0	1–4	0–1	0–0	1–1	2–1	0–2	1–4	0–4
Ilford	5–1	1–0	3–1	3–3	0–2	2–2	2–3	0–1	3–1	2–2	2–0	—	1–4	2–0	1–1	2–1	2–1	0–0	0–0	3–1
Little Oakley	3–1	2–2	2–0	1–0	1–0	2–1	1–0	1–2	3–0	4–0	1–0	2–0	—	1–0	1–2	3–1	1–2	4–0	2–0	1–2
Romford	2–2	1–2	1–1	1–1	0–2	0–1	0–4	3–4	3–2	2–1	1–2	0–3	1–2	—	2–4	0–8	1–3	3–1	3–3	2–4
Saffron Walden Town	2–4	2–2	4–0	5–1	0–5	5–0	3–1	8–2	1–2	4–0	4–0	1–1	2–2	6–0	—	1–1	1–1	2–3	0–2	1–1
Soul Tower Hamlets	5–2	1–0	3–2	2–1	1–0	3–0	2–0	3–0	1–1	4–0	1–0	3–1	1–3	3–3	1–2	—	1–0	3–2	6–0	1–1
Sporting Bengal United	0–1	0–5	2–0	0–2	1–3	3–0	2–2	3–3	1–3	0–2	0–3	1–4	0–1	2–2	1–3	0–3	—	2–3	2–1	2–1
West Essex	2–0	1–6	3–3	1–1	0–1	1–1	0–3	1–4	2–3	1–3	2–3	0–2	3–3	2–4	1–1	2–2	2–1	—	1–1	1–3
White Ensign	2–2	3–1	1–0	1–2	1–2	2–2	3–5	3–0	0–4	1–2	0–1	1–4	0–1	0–2	3–4	2–5	3–1	3–1	—	0–2
Woodford Town	2–1	0–3	2–0	0–2	1–6	3–1	2–3	1–2	2–1	3–0	0–2	1–2	0–4	1–2	1–4	3–4	4–0	1–2	2–1	—

Source: FA Full-Time Grid
Legend: Blue = home team win; Yellow = draw; Red = away team win.
For upcoming matches, an "a" indicates there is an article about the rivalry between the two participants.

== Stadiums and locations ==
Locations of the Essex Senior League clubs
Greater London Essex Senior League football clubs

Team	Location	Stadium	Capacity
Athletic Newham	Dagenham, East London	Bobby Moore Sports Hub	800
Barking	Dagenham, East London	Mayesbrook Park	2,500
Basildon United	Basildon, Essex	Gardiners Close	3,000
Benfleet	South Benfleet, Essex	Woodside Stadium	4,100
Buckhurst Hill	Buckhurst Hill, Essex	Roding Lane	1,500
Frenford	Ilford, East London	The Jack Carter Centre	500
Great Wakering Rovers	Great Wakering, Essex	Burroghs Park	2,500
Hackney Wick	Witham, Essex	Simarco Stadium (groundshare with Witham Town)	2,500
Halstead Town	Halstead, Essex	Rosemary Lane	3,500
Harwich & Parkeston	Harwich, Essex	Royal Oak	3,000
Hullbridge Sports	Hullbridge, Essex	Lower Road	1,500
Ilford	Ilford, East London	Cricklefield Stadium	3,500
Little Oakley	Little Oakley, Essex	Little Oakley War Memorial Ground	1,000
Romford	Dagenham, East London	Mayesbrook Park (groundshare with Barking)	2,500
Saffron Walden Town	Saffron Walden, Essex	Catons Lane	3,000
Sporting Bengal United	Mile End, East London	Mile End Stadium	3,000
Soul Tower Hamlets	Mile End, East London	Mile End Stadium	3,000
West Essex	Walthamstow, East London	Wadham Lodge (groundshare with Walthamstow)	3,500
White Ensign	Great Wakering, Essex	Burroghs Park (groundshare with Great Wakering Rovers)	2,500
Woodford Town	Woodford, London	Ashton Playing Fields	3,000

== Statistics ==
Goal scorers
Player	Team	Goals
(England) Kaleel Green	Saffron Walden Town	27
(England) Ellis Devereux	Romford/Hullbridge Sports	20
(England) Daniel Izekor	Ilford	19
(England) Harry Lusher	Buckhurst Hill	18
(England) Ollie Sotoyinbo	Woodford Town	17

=== Attendances (League matches only) ===
Team	Average	Highest	Lowest
Halstead Town	315	785 vs Benfleet	132 vs Frenford
Benfleet	254	452 vs Hullbridge Sports	131 vs Halstead Town
Saffron Walden Town	197	331 vs Benfleet	110 vs Ilford
Harwich & Parkeston	184	665 vs Little Oakley	81 vs Benfleet
Hullbridge Sports	166	501 vs Benfleet	90 vs Athletic Newham
Great Wakering Rovers	132	430 vs Little Oakley	73 vs Sporting Bengal United
Buckhurst Hill	131	408 vs Halstead Town	76 vs Hullbridge Sports
Romford	128	176 vs West Essex	95 vs Sporting Bengal United
Little Oakley	110	580 vs Harwich & Parkeston	58 vs Hackney Wick
West Essex	91	156 vs Great Wakering Rovers	45 vs Benfleet
White Ensign	90	302 vs Great Wakering Rovers	46 vs Sporting Bengal United
Basildon United	79	141 vs Benfleet	33 vs Frenford
Barking	78	137 vs Romford	54 vs Hullbridge Sports
Ilford	76	135 vs Romford	49 vs Athletic Newham
Woodford Town	70	176 vs Soul Tower Hamlets	72 vs Sporting Bengal United
Soul Tower Hamlets	60	94 vs Sporting Bengal United	32 vs Benfleet
Frenford	55	92 vs Romford	30 vs Sporting Bengal United
Hackney Wick	54	97 vs Romford	24 vs Athletic Newham
Sporting Bengal United	46	77 vs Athletic Newham	17 vs Halstead Town
Athletic Newham	41	76 vs Benfleet	20 vs Harwich & Parkeston
