= 2026–27 Isthmian League =

The 2026–27 season is the 112th season of the Isthmian League, which is an English football competition featuring semi-professional and amateur clubs from London, East and South East England. The league operates four divisions, the Premier Division at Step 3 and three divisions, North, South Central and South East at Step 4 of the National League System. This is the seventh season since the former South Division was subdivided into the South Central and South East divisions. The league is also known as the Pitching In League under a sponsorship deal with Entain, formerly GVC Holdings.

The allocations for steps 3 and 4 were announced by The Football Association (FA) on 14 May 2026.

== Premier Division ==
Isthmian League Premier Division
- Season: 2026–27

The Premier Division comprised fifteen teams from the previous season, as well as seven clubs who newly joined the division.

=== Team changes ===
To the Premier Division

Promoted from the North Division

- Maldon & Tiptree
- Stanway Rovers

Promoted from the South Central Division

- Leatherhead

Promoted from the South East Division

- AFC Whyteleafe
- Three Bridges

Relegated from the National League South

- Eastbourne Borough
- Enfield Town

From the Premier Division

Promoted to the National League South

- Billericay Town
- Folkestone Invicta

Transferred to the Southern League Premier Division South

- Chichester City

Relegated to the North Division

- Canvey Island
- Hashtag United

Relegated to the South East Division

- Cray Valley Paper Mills

Relegated to the Southern League Division One Central

- Potters Bar Town

=== Premier Division table ===
Pos	Team	Pld	W	D	L	GF	GA	GD	Pts	Promotion, qualification or relegation
1	Welling United	19	13	2	4	42	20	+22	41	Promotion to the National League South
2	Enfield Town	17	12	2	3	49	22	+27	38	Qualification for the play-off semi-finals
3	Dartford	18	12	0	6	32	23	+9	36	Qualification for the play-off semi-finals
4	Eastbourne Borough	17	11	2	4	35	22	+13	35	Qualification for the play-off quarter-finals
5	Ramsgate	18	10	1	7	42	23	+19	31	Qualification for the play-off quarter-finals
6	Lewes	19	9	4	6	27	26	+1	31	Qualification for the play-off quarter-finals
7	AFC Whyteleafe	18	8	3	7	34	30	+4	27	Qualification for the play-off quarter-finals
8	Leatherhead	17	7	4	6	30	27	+3	25	
9	Wingate & Finchley	17	7	4	6	30	31	−1	25	
10	Carshalton Athletic	18	8	1	9	27	36	−9	25	
11	Cray Wanderers	13	7	3	3	30	18	+12	24	
12	St Albans City	15	7	3	5	30	25	+5	24	
13	Chatham Town	18	7	2	9	31	30	+1	23	
14	Aveley	17	7	2	8	27	28	−1	23	
15	Burgess Hill Town	18	5	8	5	28	31	−3	23	
16	Dulwich Hamlet	18	6	4	8	31	35	−4	22	
17	Brentwood Town	18	7	1	10	28	32	−4	22	
18	Maldon & Tiptree	19	6	3	10	29	43	−14	21	
19	Cheshunt	17	4	6	7	20	29	−9	18	Relegation to Step 4
20	Three Bridges	19	3	4	12	27	48	−21	13	Relegation to Step 4
21	Stanway Rovers	18	2	4	12	16	42	−26	10	Relegation to Step 4
22	Whitehawk	18	1	5	12	17	41	−24	8	Relegation to Step 4

Updated to match(es) played on 21 November 2026. Source: Isthmian League
Rules for classification: 1) points; 2) goal difference; 3) number of goals scored; 4) number of matches won; 5) head-to-head results

=== Results table ===
Home \ Away	WHY	AVE	BRE	BHT	CAR	CHA	CHE	CRW	DAR	DUL	EAB	ENF	LEA	LEW	M&T	RAM	SAC	STR	THB	WEL	WHI	W&F
AFC Whyteleafe	—		1–2	2–3	0–2	2–0	2–2		2–1	4–2								4–0			5–0	2–2
Aveley		—				1–0			4–3		2–2		1–2	0–2	1–2		1–0				3–2	3–4
Brentwood Town			—	2–0			4–2	1–4	3–0			1–3	1–2		5–1	0–3		2–3				
Burgess Hill Town	3–0	1–1	0–1	—					2–1	2–0		0–6	2–2		4–1	2–2						
Carshalton Athletic		0–2	2–0		—		4–2	2–1	0–3		0–4	1–2					0–1					2–0
Chatham Town			3–0	1–1		—				3–1			0–1	3–2	3–3				3–1	3–2		2–3
Cheshunt		2–1		1–1		3–1	—							3–1			1–1	0–0			1–1	
Cray Wanderers							0–0	—			2–1			1–2			3–3		2–0	4–1	2–1	
Dartford			1–0			1–0			—		4–1		3–0			1–2			1–0	0–3	2–1	2–1
Dulwich Hamlet		2–0	2–1		2–2	0–4	2–0			—				2–3	6–0				2–2	2–2		
Eastbourne Borough			3–2			2–1	3–0			4–2	—		0–1			2–0		1–0	3–2	1–0		
Enfield Town	0–2					4–0		3–2	0–2	3–0	4–4	—		2–0		3–2	1–2				5–1	
Leatherhead	0–0						1–2			2–3			—		1–4		2–2	7–2		4–1		0–1
Lewes	3–1				3–0				1–2		1–0	0–4		—	1–1			0–0			1–0	2–2
Maldon & Tiptree	1–2	1–0			2–3			1–5	1–2	1–1	1–2				—				3–1	0–1	3–2	
Ramsgate	5–1	4–0			2–3			2–3					1–2	4–1	2–0	—	4–0	2–0				
St Albans City	3–4			3–1		3–1								0–2			—	4–1	4–0	1–3		
Stanway Rovers		0–2		2–2	1–2		3–0					1–2				1–3		—	1–3		0–0	
Three Bridges		1–5	1–1		3–2		2–1		2–3		0–2	3–3	3–3	1–2					—			
Welling United	1–0			4–2	4–0		2–0						1–0			1–0		4–0	4–0	—	2–0	4–1
Whitehawk				1–1		0–3				1–2				0–0		1–4	1–3		3–2	2–2	—	
Wingate & Finchley			1–2	1–1	4–2			1–1		1–0		1–4			1–3	2–0		4–1				—

Updated to match(es) played on 21 November 2026. Source: Football Web Pages
Legend: Blue = home team win; Yellow = draw; Red = away team win.

=== Stadiums and locations ===
Locations of the Premier Division clubs
Greater London Premier Division football clubs

Club	Location	Stadium	Capacity
AFC Whyteleafe	London	Flamingo Park	2,500
Aveley	Aveley	Parkside	3,500
Brentwood Town	Brentwood	The Brentwood Centre Arena	1,500
Burgess Hill Town	Burgess Hill	Leylands Park	2,500
Carshalton Athletic	London (Carshalton)	War Memorial Sports Ground	5,000
Chatham Town	Chatham, Kent	The Bauvill Stadium	5,000
Cheshunt	Cheshunt	Theobalds Lane	3,174
Cray Wanderers	London (Chislehurst)	Flamingo Park	2,500
Dartford	Dartford	Princes Park	4,100
Dulwich Hamlet	London (East Dulwich)	Champion Hill	3,334
Eastbourne Borough	Eastbourne	Priory Lane	4,151
Enfield Town	London (Enfield)	Queen Elizabeth II Stadium	3,000
Leatherhead	Leatherhead	Fetcham Grove	2,000
Lewes	Lewes	The Dripping Pan	3,000
Maldon & Tiptree	Maldon	Wallace Binder Ground	2,800
Ramsgate	Ramsgate	Southwood Stadium	3,500
St Albans City	St Albans	Clarence Park	5,007
Stanway Rovers	Stanway	Hawthorns	1,500
Three Bridges	Crawley (Three Bridges)	Jubilee Field	1,500
Welling United	London (Welling)	Park View Road	4,000
Whitehawk	Brighton (Whitehawk)	The Enclosed Ground	3,126
Wingate & Finchley	London (Finchley)	The Maurice Rebak Stadium	2,638

== North Division ==
Isthmian League North Division
- Season: 2026–27

The North Division comprises 22 teams. Fifteen teams competed in the previous season in the division.

=== Team changes ===
To the North Division

Promoted from the Eastern Counties League Premier Division

- Fakenham Town
- Mulbarton Wanderers

Promoted from the Essex Senior League

- Buckhurst Hill
- Little Oakley

Relegated from the Premier Division

- Canvey Island
- Hashtag United

Relegated from the Southern League Premier Division Central

- AFC Sudbury

From the North Division

Promoted to the Premier Division

- Maldon & Tiptree
- Stanway Rovers

Transferred to the Southern League Division One Central

- Waltham Abbey

Relegated to the Eastern Counties League Premier Division

- Brantham Athletic
- Downham Town
- Mildenhall Town

Relegated to the Essex Senior League

- Heybridge Swifts

=== North Division table ===
Pos	Team	Pld	W	D	L	GF	GA	GD	Pts	Promotion, qualification or relegation
1	Gorleston	18	11	5	2	34	19	+15	38	Promotion to the Premier Division
2	Cambridge City	17	11	2	4	45	16	+29	35	Qualification for the play-off semi-finals
3	Redbridge	17	11	2	4	40	26	+14	35	Qualification for the play-off semi-finals
4	Hashtag United	17	9	4	4	46	17	+29	31	Qualification for the play-off quarter-finals
5	Newmarket Town	16	9	4	3	31	21	+10	31	Qualification for the play-off quarter-finals
6	Felixstowe & Walton United	19	8	5	6	34	33	+1	29	Qualification for the play-off quarter-finals
7	Little Oakley	17	8	4	5	27	28	−1	28	Qualification for the play-off quarter-finals
8	Wroxham	18	8	3	7	36	30	+6	27	
9	Concord Rangers	19	7	6	6	37	33	+4	27	
10	Walthamstow	20	8	2	10	31	27	+4	26	
11	Tilbury	19	6	8	5	31	28	+3	26	
12	Witham Town	16	8	2	6	32	30	+2	26	
13	Buckhurst Hill	18	7	3	8	27	28	−1	24	
14	Bowers & Pitsea	19	6	6	7	26	36	−10	24	
15	AFC Sudbury	19	6	3	10	34	34	0	21	
16	Mulbarton Wanderers	16	6	3	7	23	23	0	21	
17	Canvey Island	17	6	3	8	27	30	−3	21	
18	Takeley	17	6	3	8	22	28	−6	21	
19	Grays Athletic	18	5	2	11	26	36	−10	17	Relegation to Step 5
20	Fakenham Town	19	4	5	10	25	36	−11	17	Relegation to Step 5
21	Brightlingsea Regent	18	3	6	9	21	32	−11	15	Relegation to Step 5
22	Lowestoft Town	18	2	1	15	10	74	−64	7	Relegation to Step 5

Updated to match(es) played on 21 November 2026. Source: Isthmian League
Rules for classification: 1) points; 2) goal difference; 3) number of goals scored; 4) number of matches won; 5) head-to-head results

=== Results table ===
Home \ Away	SUD	B&P	BRI	BUC	CAM	CAN	CON	FAK	F&W	GOR	GRA	HSH	LIT	LOW	MUL	NEW	RED	TAK	TIL	WAL	WIT	WRO
AFC Sudbury	—				1–3		1–1			2–3		0–3			0–1	3–2			3–0	3–0	1–3	3–4
Bowers & Pitsea		—		0–3	1–1	3–2			2–2	1–1	1–0						1–2				1–2	3–2
Brightlingsea Regent	1–1	1–2	—	2–0		1–1		0–0			2–4			5–0			1–2		0–0			
Buckhurst Hill	2–1			—	1–0			4–0	1–4	0–2	2–0		1–1		1–1	1–2			2–2			
Cambridge City				2–0	—	1–2	3–0	2–0					7–0						6–2		5–0	
Canvey Island			1–1	0–2	3–2	—		1–3		1–2		2–1				1–2		2–0				0–1
Concord Rangers	3–2	1–2		1–2			—	2–0		3–3	2–2			5–0		2–5				2–0		
Fakenham Town		2–0						—	3–3					4–0	0–4	0–2		1–1	3–2	1–1	1–2	
Felixstowe & Walton United	2–2		5–1	3–2	2–2	3–1			—			0–0							0–4	2–1		1–2
Gorleston					2–0			2–0	1–0	—		2–0	2–3			1–1	1–2		2–1			
Grays Athletic	0–2					1–2				1–3	—	1–5		2–1			2–1	1–2		3–1		
Hashtag United			3–0	4–1								—				3–0		5–0	0–2	1–2	2–2	2–2
Little Oakley	0–3		3–1				0–1	3–2		2–2	2–1	2–2	—		2–0			1–0		0–1		
Lowestoft Town	1–4	2–2			0–2			3–2	2–0		0–6	0–8	0–5	—	0–2			0–4				
Mulbarton Wanderers	3–1	1–2			1–2		1–1		0–3		1–1				—		2–3			2–1		
Newmarket Town		2–2	2–1				1–3				4–0			1–0	2–1	—		0–0	3–3			
Redbridge		4–2			1–3		3–2		4–1	2–2		1–4		7–0			—				1–2	
Takeley	2–1		2–0	3–2			2–2		0–1						0–3		2–4	—				2–0
Tilbury		0–0	1–1			1–1	1–1					0–3	3–0				1–1	2–0	—	2–1		4–1
Walthamstow		1–0	4–0		0–4	5–2		1–0		0–1	2–1			9–0			0–1			—	0–0	
Witham Town		7–1				1–5	2–4		1–2				1–2		4–0	0–2		3–2			—	2–1
Wroxham			1–3				3–1	3–3	4–0	0–2	3–0		1–1	6–1			0–1			2–1		—

Updated to match(es) played on 21 November 2026. Source: Football Web Pages
Legend: Blue = home team win; Yellow = draw; Red = away team win.

=== Stadiums and locations ===
Locations of North Division clubs

Club	Location	Stadium	Capacity
AFC Sudbury	Sudbury	King's Marsh	2,500
Bowers & Pitsea	Pitsea	Len Salmon Stadium	3,500
Brightlingsea Regent	Brightlingsea	North Road	2,000
Buckhurst Hill	Buckhurst Hill	Roding Lane	1,500
Cambridge City	Sawston	FWD - IP Stadium	3,000
Canvey Island	Canvey Island	Park Lane	4,100
Concord Rangers	Canvey Island	Thames Road	3,300
Fakenham Town	Fakenham	Clipbush Park	2,000
Felixstowe & Walton United	Felixstowe	Dellwood Avenue	2,160
Gorleston	Gorleston-on-Sea	Wellesley Recreation Ground (groundshare with Great Yarmouth Town)	3,600
Grays Athletic	Tilbury	Chadfields (groundshare with Tilbury)	4,000
Hashtag United	Barkingside	Oakside Stadium (groundshare with Redbridge)	3,000
Little Oakley	Little Oakley	Little Oakley War Memorial Ground	1,000
Lowestoft Town	Lowestoft	Crown Meadow	3,000
Mulbarton Wanderers	Mulbarton	Mulberry Park	2,000
Newmarket Town	Newmarket	Cricket Field Road	2,750
Redbridge	Barkingside	Oakside Stadium	3,000
Takeley	Takeley	Station Road	2,000
Tilbury	Tilbury	Chadfields	4,000
Walthamstow	London (Walthamstow)	Wadham Lodge	3,500
Witham Town	Witham	Spa Road	2,500
Wroxham	Wroxham	Trafford Park	2,500

== South Central Division ==
Isthmian League South Central Division
- Season: 2026–27

The South Central Division consists of 22 teams, 16 of which competed in the previous campaign.

=== Team changes ===
To the South Central Division

Promoted from the Combined Counties League Premier Division North

- Ashford Town (Middlesex)
- Windsor & Eton

Promoted from the Combined Counties League Premier Division South

- Cobham

Promoted from the Wessex League Premier Division

- AFC Stoneham

Transferred from the South East Division

- Jersey Bulls

Transferred from the Southern League Division One South

- Winchester City

From the South Central Division

Promoted to the Premier Division

- Leatherhead

Promoted to the Southern League Premier Division South

- Hanworth Villa

Transferred to the South East Division

- South Park

Relegated to the Combined Counties League Premier Division South

- Metropolitan Police

Relegated to the Wessex League Premier Division

- Fareham Town
- Horndean

=== South Central Division table ===
Pos	Team	Pld	W	D	L	GF	GA	GD	Pts	Promotion, qualification or relegation
1	Egham Town	19	14	1	4	48	26	+22	43	Promotion to the Southern League Premier Division South
2	Jersey Bulls	18	12	5	1	46	20	+26	41	Qualification for the play-off semi-finals
3	Bognor Regis Town	19	12	4	3	40	24	+16	40	Qualification for the play-off semi-finals
4	Winchester City	19	12	3	4	52	31	+21	39	Qualification for the play-off quarter-finals
5	Moneyfields	20	10	4	6	32	22	+10	34	Qualification for the play-off quarter-finals
6	Southall	16	9	5	2	37	20	+17	32	Qualification for the play-off quarter-finals
7	AFC Portchester	17	8	6	3	26	18	+8	30	Qualification for the play-off quarter-finals
8	Hayes & Yeading United	17	8	5	4	35	25	+10	29	
9	Westfield	18	7	7	4	30	22	+8	28	
10	Kingstonian	18	7	5	6	46	40	+6	26	
11	Ashford Town (Middlesex)	18	8	2	8	36	30	+6	26	
12	Raynes Park Vale	18	8	1	9	27	33	−6	25	
13	Hartley Wintney	18	7	3	8	32	37	−5	24	
14	Windsor & Eton	17	6	5	6	27	27	0	23	
15	Bedfont Sports	18	5	5	8	26	33	−7	20	
16	Hendon	15	4	5	6	32	33	−1	17	
17	AFC Stoneham	16	3	5	8	20	32	−12	14	
17	Harrow Borough	17	3	5	9	20	32	−12	14	
19	Cobham	18	3	2	13	16	37	−21	11	Relegation to Step 5
20	Ascot United	19	2	3	14	24	55	−31	9	Relegation to Step 5
21	Binfield	16	2	1	13	24	47	−23	7	Relegation to Step 5
22	Littlehampton Town	17	1	4	12	17	49	−32	7	Relegation to Step 5

Updated to match(es) played on 21 November 2026. Source: Isthmian League
Rules for classification: 1) points; 2) goal difference; 3) number of goals scored; 4) number of matches won; 5) head-to-head results

=== Results table ===
Home \ Away	POR	STO	ASC	ASH	BED	BIN	BRT	COB	EGH	HWB	HWY	H&Y	HEN	JER	KIN	LIT	MON	RPV	SHL	WES	WNC	W&E
AFC Portchester	—	1–0		1–2	2–0		0–0	0–0					4–2		2–2					1–1		
AFC Stoneham		—	3–2	0–2										0–2	2–2		0–1				1–4	1–1
Ascot United			—		1–3	4–0	1–2			1–1		2–4			3–3	3–1		0–4		1–1		1–3
Ashford Town (Middlesex)		0–1	7–0	—		4–0		2–3	3–2		1–3					2–2		3–2		1–3		
Bedfont Sports		4–4	2–1		—			1–0			3–1			2–3			0–2		0–0	1–4		1–2
Binfield	2–4		4–0		1–3	—					0–1		2–3			6–1	1–2		0–5			
Bognor Regis Town	0–0					2–1	—		0–1	3–1	7–0	2–1	3–3			2–1	2–1					4–2
Cobham				0–1		2–1	2–2	—	0–1	1–2	0–1	3–2					1–3					0–4
Egham Town	4–2	2–0	5–0			6–2			—	0–3	2–1			3–3		6–0					2–1	
Harrow Borough		1–0		1–2	0–0				0–4	—				0–1	1–3	1–1			2–2			
Hartley Wintney	0–1	2–2							0–2		—	0–0	2–2	3–2	5–2				0–4			1–0
Hayes & Yeading United				3–1	2–2	5–2		2–1		4–3		—			3–2		0–0	0–2		3–0		
Hendon				1–1	1–0				0–2				—	2–4				7–0	3–3	0–1	2–4	
Jersey Bulls	3–1		4–2	2–1						3–0		1–1		—			1–0	5–1				
Kingstonian	0–0		4–0		6–3	4–1	4–5				5–2			0–2	—		3–2	4–2			1–2	
Littlehampton Town							0–1	3–0			1–8		3–4	0–6		—		0–1	0–1	1–3	1–1	
Moneyfields	0–1		2–1	2–1							3–2		3–1	1–1			—	1–0	2–2	0–0	5–1	
Raynes Park Vale		2–3			2–0		0–1		2–3	2–1		0–2	1–1				2–1	—			2–1	2–0
Southall			2–1	4–2			3–1	4–1								3–1	2–1		—	0–3		
Westfield	1–2					1–1		3–0	4–0	1–1					1–1	1–1				—	0–4	
Winchester City		4–1			1–1		1–2	4–2	5–0	4–2		4–3		0–0					3–2	4–2	—	4–2
Windsor & Eton	1–4	2–2					2–1	1–0	0–3			0–0		3–3	4–0				0–0			—

Updated to match(es) played on 21 November 2026. Source: Football Web Pages
Legend: Blue = home team win; Yellow = draw; Red = away team win.

=== Stadiums and locations ===
Locations of South Central Division clubs
Greater London South Central Division clubs

Club	Location	Stadium	Capacity
AFC Portchester	Portchester	Onsite Group Stadium	1,500
AFC Stoneham	Eastleigh	Stoneham Lane Football Complex	1,000
Ascot United	Ascot	The Racecourse Ground	1,150
Ashford Town (Middlesex)	Ashford	Robert Parker Stadium	2,550
Bedfont Sports	Bedfont	Bedfont Recreation Ground	3,000
Binfield	Binfield	Hill Farm Lane	1,000
Bognor Regis Town	Bognor Regis	Nyewood Lane	4,500
Cobham	Cobham	Leg O'Mutton Field	2,000
Egham Town	Egham	Runnymede Stadium	5,500
Harrow Borough	Harrow	Earlsmead Stadium	3,070
Hartley Wintney	Hartley Wintney	The Memorial Playing Fields	2,000
Hayes & Yeading United	Hayes, Hillingdon	SkyEx Community Stadium	3,000
Hendon	London (Hendon)	Silver Jubilee Park	1,990
Jersey Bulls	St Helier, Jersey	Springfield Stadium	2,000
Kingstonian	Kingston upon Thames	Imperial Fields (groundshare with Tooting & Mitcham United)	3,500
Littlehampton Town	Littlehampton	The Sportsfield	4,000
Moneyfields	Portsmouth	John Jenkins Stadium	1,180
Raynes Park Vale	Raynes Park	Grand Drive	1,900
Southall	Stanwell	Skyex Community Stadium (groundshare with Hayes & Yeading United)	3,000
Westfield	Woking (Westfield)	Woking Park	1,500
Winchester City	Winchester	The City Ground	4,500
Windsor & Eton	Windsor	Stag Meadow	4,500

== South East Division ==
Isthmian League South East Division
- Season: 2026–27

The South East Division will consist of 22 teams, fifteen of which competed in the previous season.

=== Team changes ===
To the South East Division

Promoted from the Combined Counties League Premier Division South

- Horley Town

Promoted from the Southern Combination League Premier Division

- Peacehaven & Telscombe
- Steyning Town

Promoted from the Southern Counties East League Premier Division

- Punjab United
- Whitstable Town

Relegated from the Premier Division

- Cray Valley Paper Mills

Transferred from the South Central Division

- South Park

From the South East Division

Promoted to the Premier Division

- AFC Whyteleafe
- Three Bridges

Transferred to the South Central Division

- Jersey Bulls

Relegated to the Southern Combination League Premier Division

- East Grinstead Town
- Hassocks

Relegated to the Southern Counties East League Premier Division

- Beckenham Town

Club folded

- VCD Athletic

=== South East Division table ===
Pos	Team	Pld	W	D	L	GF	GA	GD	Pts	Promotion, qualification or relegation
1	Faversham Town	19	12	4	3	42	26	+16	40	Promotion to the Premier Division
2	Erith Town	17	11	3	3	44	24	+20	36	Qualification for the play-off semi-finals
3	Whitstable Town	18	11	3	4	34	22	+12	36	Qualification for the play-off semi-finals
4	Herne Bay	18	10	2	6	37	24	+13	32	Qualification for the play-off quarter-finals
5	Hastings United	18	10	1	7	33	27	+6	31	Qualification for the play-off quarter-finals
6	Sevenoaks Town	19	9	4	6	35	35	0	31	Qualification for the play-off quarter-finals
7	Broadbridge Heath	18	8	6	4	36	24	+12	30	Qualification for the play-off quarter-finals
8	South Park	18	8	6	4	32	21	+11	30	
9	Punjab United	19	8	5	6	36	35	+1	29	
10	Ashford United	19	8	4	7	31	25	+6	28	
11	Sheppey United	18	7	4	7	28	25	+3	25	
12	AFC Croydon Athletic	17	8	1	8	27	24	+3	25	
13	Sittingbourne	19	7	4	8	29	34	−5	25	
14	Margate	19	7	4	8	26	33	−7	25	
15	Steyning Town	19	8	0	11	29	39	−10	24	
16	Cray Valley Paper Mills	19	6	5	8	31	29	+2	23	
17	Crowborough Athletic	19	6	3	10	36	42	−6	21	
18	Merstham	16	5	4	7	29	29	0	19	
19	Deal Town	18	4	6	8	28	39	−11	18	Relegation to Step 5
20	Peacehaven & Telscombe	19	4	5	10	27	41	−14	17	Relegation to Step 5
21	Eastbourne Town	19	2	5	12	21	40	−19	11	Relegation to Step 5
22	Horley Town	19	3	1	15	23	56	−33	10	Relegation to Step 5

Updated to match(es) played on 21 November 2026. Source: Football Web Pages
Rules for classification: 1) points; 2) goal difference; 3) number of goals scored; 4) number of matches won; 5) head-to-head results

=== Results table ===
Home \ Away	ACA	ASH	BRO	CVP	CRW	DEA	EAS	ERI	FAV	HAS	HER	HOR	MAR	MER	P&T	PUN	SEV	SHE	SIT	SPK	STE	WHI
AFC Croydon Athletic	—	3–1	1–1	2–0				3–2			0–1		1–3				2–1		1–2			
Ashford United		—	1–2		0–2		4–0			1–3	1–0	2–2	2–0					1–1		1–1	2–0	
Broadbridge Heath			—		2–1	1–1				2–0	2–2	4–1		3–1	3–0				2–2	2–2		1–3
Cray Valley Paper Mills			1–4	—					1–1	0–3	3–0		0–0	4–1	2–3	2–2	0–0		1–3			
Crowborough Athletic	1–3			2–7	—	3–1		2–4				3–0	3–3				5–2	0–1		0–2	1–0	
Deal Town	1–0	2–2		0–3		—	2–2		2–4		1–3			3–2		6–1				0–0		
Eastbourne Town	0–3						—		1–2	0–2		7–0			5–0	0–4			1–1	0–3	0–1	0–0
Erith Town						4–2		—			4–1	2–0	3–0			5–1	4–0	4–3	2–1			
Faversham Town						4–2		0–0	—		3–1			1–3	1–0	4–3	3–1	3–2		2–2		2–3
Hastings United	2–1				4–3	0–1	3–1	2–0	0–1	—				3–0			0–3				1–4	
Herne Bay		1–0	2–1				1–0				—	3–0	2–0		5–0		5–0		3–3		3–4	
Horley Town				0–3				2–3	0–3	3–2		—			3–5		2–3	0–4	3–1			2–4
Margate			0–2		2–1		2–1		0–1	2–2			—	0–5		2–2		2–1		2–3		
Merstham		0–2			2–2		5–1	1–3						—	3–3	1–0					3–1	
Peacehaven & Telscombe		1–4			2–2	1–1		3–3					2–3	0–0	—		0–1				1–2	4–0
Punjab United	2–1	3–0		3–1	3–1		1–1				2–1	3–2				—		0–3	0–1			
Sevenoaks Town	2–1	1–3	3–2				5–0		2–2				2–1	1–1			—		4–2			2–2
Sheppey United			1–1	2–1		2–2	1–1			1–2	0–3	1–0	0–1		2–1			—		1–2		
Sittingbourne		3–2		1–1					0–3	2–3				2–1	0–1				—	1–0	0–2	2–3
South Park	1–2		2–1	2–0				1–1		2–1		1–2				2–2				—	5–1	1–2
Steyning Town	2–3	0–2			0–3	4–0			3–2			2–1				2–4	0–2	1–2			—	
Whitstable Town	2–0			0–1	4–1	3–1		2–0					0–3		1–0	0–0			1–2		4–0	—

Updated to match(es) played on 21 November 2026. Source: Football Web Pages
Legend: Blue = home team win; Yellow = draw; Red = away team win.

=== Stadiums and locations ===
Locations of South East Division clubs
Greater London South East Division football clubs

Club	Location	Stadium	Capacity
AFC Croydon Athletic	Thornton Heath	Mayfield Stadium	3,000
Ashford United	Ashford, Kent	The Homelands	3,200
Broadbridge Heath	Broadbridge Heath	High Wood Hill Sports Ground	2,000
Cray Valley Paper Mills	Eltham	Badgers Sports Ground	1,550
Crowborough Athletic	Crowborough	Crowborough Community Stadium	2,000
Deal Town	Deal	Charles Sports Ground	2,000
Eastbourne Town	Eastbourne	The Saffrons	3,000
Erith Town	Thamesmead	Bayliss Avenue	1,000
Faversham Town	Faversham	Salters Lane	2,000
Hastings United	Hastings	The Pilot Field	4,050
Herne Bay	Herne Bay	Winch's Field	3,000
Horley Town	Horley	The New Defence	1,800
Margate	Margate	Hartsdown Park	2,100
Merstham	Merstham	Moatside	2,500
Peacehaven & Telscombe	Peacehaven	The Sports Park	3,000
Punjab United	Gravesend	Elite Venue	600
Sevenoaks Town	Sevenoaks	Greatness Park	1,500
Sheppey United	Isle of Sheppey	Holm Park	1,530
Sittingbourne	Sittingbourne	Woodstock Park	1,930
South Park	Reigate	King George's Field	2,000
Steyning Town	Steyning	The Shooting Field	2,000
Whitstable Town	Whitstable	The Belmont Ground	3,000
