= Woodford Town F.C. =

Association football club in England

Coordinates: 51°36′26″N 0°3′0″E

Woodford Town
- Full name: Woodford Town Football Club
- Nickname: The Woods
- Founded: 2002
- Ground: Ashton Playing Fields, Woodford
- Chairman: Tony Scott
- Manager: Shane Baptiste
- League: Essex Senior League
- 2025–26: Essex Senior League, 11th of 20
- Website: woodfordtownfc.com
| Home colours | Away colours |

Woodford Town Football Club is a football club based in Woodford in the London Borough of Redbridge. They are currently members of the Essex Senior League and play at Ashton Playing Fields.

== History ==
Established as Mauritius Sports in 2002, the club was founded with the aim of providing a good standard of footballing opportunity for the Mauritian community in London, as well as providing a feeder for British-born Mauritians to play for their country at international level. The new club joined Division One of the London Intermediate League for the 2001–02 season, before becoming members of the Premier Division of the Middlesex County League in 2003. They merged with CMB (Metal Box) in 2004, and played as Mauritius Sports (CMB) in the 2004–05 season before reverting to their original name.

The club were accepted into the Essex Senior League for the 2007–08 season following a merger of Mauritius Sports and Walthamstow Avenue & Pennant and were initially named Mauritius Sports & Pennant. Two years later they were renamed Mauritius Sports Association UK, before becoming Haringey & Waltham Development in 2011. Following its association with the Greenhouse London sports charity, the club changed its name again in 2013, becoming Greenhouse London, and then Greenhouse Sports in 2015. The club became Haringey & Waltham in 2016. Although they finished bottom of the league in 2016–17, they were reprieved from relegation. They then changed their name to Woodford Town 2017 for the 2017–18 season, succeeding the club who left the Spartan South Midlands League in 2016. The 2017 part of the name was dropped in 2019.

In 2023–24 Woodford were runners-up in the Essex Senior League, qualifying for the promotion play-offs. They were knocked out at the semi-final stage, losing 5–4 on penalties to Sporting Bengal United after a 1–1 draw. After finishing third in the league in 2024–25 they defeated Great Wakering Rovers 2–1 in the play-off semi-finals before losing 2–0 to Takeley in the final.

== Ground ==
The club played at Waltham Forest's Wadham Lodge ground in Walthamstow until 2011, when they moved to Coles Park in Haringey to groundshare with Haringey Borough. In 2016 they moved to the Terence McMillan Stadium in Plaistow before starting a groundshare with Broxbourne at Goff's Lane for the 2017–18 season. The club relocated to the Harlow Arena prior to the 2018–19 season, and announced their intention to return to Woodford at Ashton Playing Fields for 2020.

The club were due to move into Ashton Playing Fields in November 2020, however new lockdown measures due to the COVID-19 pandemic in England postponed the club's return to Woodford. The stand at the new ground is named the 'Jas Athwal Stand' in recognition of Jas Athwal, the Labour Party politician and Leader of Redbridge Council, for his contribution to bringing the club home to Woodford. On 13 August 2021, Woodford played their first game at the stadium, losing 2–1 against Stansted in front of 822 spectators.

== Records ==
- Best FA Cup performance: Third qualifying round, 2025–26
- Best FA Vase performance: Second round, 2011–12, 2015–16, 2022–23, 2023–24

== See also ==
- Woodford Town F.C. players
- Football in London
