= Barking F.C. =

Association football club in England

Coordinates: 51°32′51″N 0°06′41″E

Barking
- Full name: Barking Football Club
- Nickname: The Blues
- Founded: 1896 (refounded in 2006)
- Ground: Mayesbrook Park, Dagenham
- Capacity: 2,500 (200 seated)
- Chairman: Rob O'Brien
- Manager: Craig Edwards
- League: Essex Senior League
- 2025–26: Essex Senior League, 5th of 20
- Website: barking-fc.co.uk
Home colours	Away colours

Barking Football Club is a football club based in Barking, Greater London, England. They are currently members of the Essex Senior League and play at Mayesbrook Park.

== History ==
The origins of the modern club are unclear, with several potential claims; Barking Institute was either formed around 1896 as Barking Working Lads' Institute (or possibly earlier as Barking Working Men's Institute) or was a renamed Barking Rovers, who had been established in 1880 and later renamed by the Church Institute when they took over running it. They won the Essex Senior Cup in 1893–94 and 1895–96, before becoming champions of Division One of the South Essex League in 1898–99, the Leyton & District League in 1899–1900, Division Two of the South Essex League in 1900–02 and Division Two A in 1901–01, before changing its name to Barking in 1902. They also played in the London League, winning Division One A in 1909–10, before winning the South Essex League again in 1911–12, a season in which they also won the London Senior Cup for the first time. In 1912 Barking became founder members of the Athenian League, but withdrew after only two matches and their record was expunged.

In 1919 the club changed its name to Barking Town, going on to win the Essex Senior Cup in the 1919–20 season. The following season they won the Premier Division of the London League and the London Senior Cup, before rejoining the Athenian League in 1923. The 1926–27 season saw them reach the first round of the FA Cup, eventually losing to Gillingham in a replay. They also reached the final of the FA Amateur Cup, where they lost 3–1 to Leyton, but did win the London Senior Cup for a third time. They reached the first round of the FA Cup again in 1928–29, but lost 6–0 at Exeter City. In 1932 they reverted to the name Barking, and in 1934–35 won the Athenian League title.

Following World War II, Barking won the 1945–46 Essex Senior Cup. In 1952 they switched to the Isthmian League, but had to wait until 1978–79 before winning the league again; during that period they won further Essex Senior Cup titles in 1962–63 and 1969–70. The 1978–79 season also saw them reach the second round of the FA Cup, defeating Yeovil Town in the first round, before losing 2–1 at home to Aldershot, as well as winning the London Senior Cup for a fourth time. The following season they reached the second round again, defeating Third Division Oxford United before losing 3–1 to Reading. In 1981–82 they took Gillingham to a replay in the second round, losing 3–1. Their last appearance in the second round came in 1983–84, when they lost 2–1 at Plymouth Argyle. A seventh Essex Senior Cup final win was achieved in 1989–90.

They remained in the Isthmian League Premier Division until relegation to Division One at the end of the 1990–91 season. After finishing bottom in 1995–96 the club was relegated to Division Two. In 2001 Barking ceased to exist when they merged with East Ham United to form Barking & East Ham United. However, when the new club folded in 2006, Barking were re-established and joined the Essex Senior League. In 2016–17 the club won the Essex Senior League, earning promotion to the North Division of the Isthmian League. At the end of the 2018–19 season they were transferred to the South Central Division. In 2021 the club was transferred back to the North Division. They finished second-from-bottom of the division in 2021–22 and were relegated to the Essex Senior League. In 2022–23 the club won the Essex Senior League's Errington Cup, beating Redbridge 5–4 on penalties in the final, following a 1–1 draw.

The 2023–24 season saw Barking finish fourth in the Essex Senior League, qualifying for the promotion play-offs. They went on to lose 1–0 to Romford in the semi-finals. In 2024-25 they finished fifth, going on to lose 2–0 to Takeley in the play-off semi-finals. The club won the Essex Senior League's Peter Butcher Memorial trophy the following season, beating Buckhurst Hill 1–0 in the final. After finishing fifth in the league they defeated Soul Tower Hamlets 2–1 in the semi-finals before losing 1–0 to Buckhurst Hill in the final.

== Ground ==
Barking Institute originally played at the Recreation Ground in Barking Park, before moving to Vicarage Field, which had been in use by Barking Rovers since 1884. Floodlights were installed in 1958 and they were the first Isthmian League club to play a league match under lights. In 1973 the club were forced to leave the ground by the council and moved to Mayesbrook Park. The club brought the floodlights from Vicarage Field and installed a temporary trailer stand on the northern side of the pitch. This was later replaced by a permanent stand on the south side with 210 seats and standing for 450. An uncovered terrace was installed behind the western end of the pitch, which had a roof added in 2001 when Barking merged with East Ham United.

== Honours ==
- Isthmian League
  - Premier Division champions 1978–79
  - Dylon Shield winners 1979–80
- Athenian League
  - Champions 1934–35
- London League
  - Premier Division champions 1920–21
  - Division One A champions 1909–10
- Essex Senior League
  - Champions 2016–17
  - Errington Cup winners 2022–23
  - Peter Butcher Memorial Trophy winners 2025–26
  - Gordon Brasted Memorial Trophy winners 2014–15
- South Essex League
  - Division One champions 1898–99, 1911–12
  - Division Two champions 1900–01
  - Division Two A champions 1901–02
- Leyton & District League
  - Champions 1899–1900
- Essex Senior Cup
  - Winners 1893–94, 1895–96, 1919–20, 1945–46, 1962–63, 1969–70, 1989–90
- London Senior Cup
  - Winners 1911–12, 1920–21, 1926–27, 1978–79
- London Charity Cup
  - Winners 1961–62
- East Anglian Cup
  - Winners 1937–38, 1953–54 (joint)
- Essex Thameside Trophy
  - Winners 1952–53 (joint), 1956–57, 1958–69, 1996–97
- Essex Elizabethan Trophy
  - Winners 1966–67
- Mithras Cup
  - Winners 1965–66, 1966–67, 1970–71

== Records ==
- Best FA Cup performance: Second round replay, 1981–82
- Best FA Amateur Cup performance: Runners-up, 1926–27
- Best FA Trophy performance: Second round, 1979–80
- Best FA Vase performance: Fifth round, 1996–97
- Record attendance: 1,972 vs Aldershot, FA Cup second round, 16 December 1978
- Most appearances: Bob Makin, 566
- Most goals: Neville Fox, 241 (1965–73)

== See also ==
- Barking F.C. players
- Barking F.C. managers
