= Great Wakering Rovers F.C. =

English football club

Coordinates: 51°33′20″N 0°47′52″E

Great Wakering Rovers
- Full name: Great Wakering Rovers Football Club
- Nickname: Rovers
- Founded: 1919
- Ground: Burroughs Park, Great Wakering
- Capacity: 3,000 (250 seated)
- Chairman: Steve Swain
- Manager: Marcus Bowers
- League: Essex Senior League
- 2025–26: Essex Senior League, 3rd of 20
- Website: gwrovers.co
Home colours	Away colours

Great Wakering Rovers Football Club is a football club located in Great Wakering, near Southend-on-Sea in Essex, England. The club are members of the Essex Senior League and play at Burroughs Park.

== History ==
The club was formed in 1919 by soldiers demobbed after World War I who found employment in the local brickfields. They joined the Southend & District League, dominating it during the 1960s and 1970s. In 1982 they switched to the newly-formed Southend & District Alliance Football League, but this league folded in 1989. At this point the club decided to make the step up to intermediate level and were founder members of the new Division Three of Essex Intermediate League.

In 1990–91 Great Wakering were Division Three champions, earning promotion to Division Two. After winning Division Two the following season, the club successfully applied to join the Essex Senior League. They went on to win the league in 1994–95 and finished as runners-up three times in the next two seasons. They were runners-up again in 1998–99, but as champions Saffron Walden Town failed to meet the ground grading requirements for a place in Division Three of the Isthmian League, Great Wakering were promoted in their place.

The 1999–2000 season saw Great Wakering finish as runners-up in Division Three, earning promotion to Division Two. League restructuring resulted in them being moved to Division One North in 2002, and in 2004 they were transferred to the Eastern Division of the Southern League, where they remained for two seasons before being transferred back to Division One North of the Isthmian League. In 2011–12 the club finished bottom of the division, and were relegated back to the Essex Senior League. In 2013–14 the club were Essex Senior League champions and were promoted back to the Isthmian League. After finishing bottom of the division in 2016–17, the club were relegated to the Essex Senior League. However, they went on to win the league at the first attempt, earning promotion back to the renamed North Division of the Isthmian League. The season also saw them win the league's Errington Challenge Cup, beating Sawbridgeworth Town 1–0 in the final.

In 2022–23 Great Wakering finished third-from-bottom of the North Division, resulting in them facing an inter-step play-off with a club from the division below. After being beaten 5–0 by Quorn they were relegated to the Essex Senior League. In 2023–24 the club reached the final of the FA Vase, where they lost 3–0 to Romford. The following season saw them finish fourth in the Essex Senior League, qualifying for the promotion play-offs in which they lost 2–1 to Woodford Town in the semi-finals. However, they won the league's Peter Butcher Memorial Trophy, beating Little Oakley 1–0 in the final, and claimed the Errington Challenge Cup by defeating the same opponents on penalties. The club retained the Errington Challenge Cup in 2025–26, beating Halstead Town 3–1 in the final. They also finished third in the league, before beating beaten on penalties by Buckhurst Hill in the play-off semi-finals.

== Ground ==
In 1985 the club obtained a lease from the parish council on a disused allotment site. A football ground was built by volunteers with the help of local farmer and supporter Roger Burroughs, who it was named after. The ground opened in 1989, with work starting on the main stand (the North Stand) in 1992, at which time a small covered area was built on the other side of the pitch. A roof was put on the main stand in 1996 and 175 seats later installed. A new covered terrace was installed in 2000. The North Stand was also expanded and currently seats 250.

A record attendance of 1,150 was set in 2006 for a pre-season friendly against Southend United. The record was broken in July 2021 when a crowd of 1,500 watched another pre-season friendly against the same opponents. A new record of 1,502 was set for an FA Vase semi-final match against Worcester City in April 2024.

== Honours ==
- Essex Senior League
  - Champions 1994–95, 2013–14, 2017–18
  - Errington Challenge Cup winners 2013-14, 2017–18, 2024–25, 2025–26
  - Peter Butcher Memorial Trophy winners 2024–25
- Essex Intermediate League
  - Division Two champions 1991–92
  - Division Three champions 1990–91
  - Intermediate Cup winners 1991–92
  - Intermediate Senior Cup winners 1991–92
- Southend & District League
  - Premier Division champions 1962–63, 1963–64, 1964–65, 1965–66, 1967–68, 1968–69, 1969–70, 1970–71, 1973–74
  - Division One champions 1927–28, 1929–30, 1931–32, 1932–33, 1935–36, 1953–54, 1954–55, 1956–57, 1957–58, 1958–59, 1960–61, 1961–62, 1983–84
  - Division Two champions 1921–22, 1947–48
  - Division Three champions 1926–27
  - French Cup winners 1952–53, 1953–54, 1954–55, 1960–61, 1963–64, 1966–67, 1967–68, 1968–69, 1969–70, 1970–71, 1971–72, 1975–76, 1976–77
  - Ramuz Cup winners 1932–33, 1953–54, 1956–57, 1974–75, 1993–94
  - Sanders Cup winners 1966–67, 1967–68
  - Ellis Cup winners 1966–67
  - Shaw Cup winners 1982–83
  - GJJM Cup winners 1987–88
- Southend Charity Competition
  - Section A winners 1922–23, 1957–58, 1961–62, 1966–67, 1969–70, 1971–72, 1975–76, 1990–91, 1991–92
  - Section C winners 1992–93

== Records ==
- Best FA Cup performance: Second qualifying round, 1998–99, 2006–07
- Best FA Trophy performance: First round, 2002–03, 2004–05
- Best FA Vase performance: Runners-up, 2023–24
- Record attendance: 1,502 vs Worcester City, FA Vase semi-final, 13 April 2024
- Most appearances: John Heffer 511
- Biggest win: 9–0 vs Eton Manor, 27 December 1931
- Heaviest defeat: 1–7 vs Bowers United, Essex Senior League, 1 April 1998

== See also ==
- Great Wakering Rovers F.C. players
- Great Wakering Rovers F.C. managers
