= Tom Barton =

Tom or Thomas Barton may refer to:

- Thomas Barton (Bordeaux merchant) (1695–1780), wine merchant in Bordeaux
- Thomas Barton (divine) (1730–1780), Irish divine
- Thomas Barton (Medal of Honor) (c. 1831–?), American Medal of Honor recipient
- Thomas Barton (Royalist) (died 1681/2), Royalist divine
- Thomas Barton (Irish MP) (1757–1820), Irish landowner and politician
- Thomas J. Barton (born 1940), American chemist
- Thomas Pennant Barton (1803–1869), American diplomat and bibliophile
- Tom Barton (politician) (1949–2023), Australian politician
- Tom Barton (rugby league) (1883–1958), English professional rugby league footballer
- Tom Barton (high jumper), winner of the 1991 high jump at the NCAA Division I Indoor Track and Field Championships
