= West Essex F.C. =

Association football club in England

Coordinates: 51.5974°N 0.008996°W

West Essex
- Full name: West Essex Football Club
- Founded: 1989
- Ground: Wadham Lodge, Walthamstow
- Chairman: Mark Penfold
- Manager: Trevor Grace
- League: Essex Senior League
- 2025–26: Essex Senior League, 18th of 20
Home colours	Away colours

West Essex Football Club is a football club based in Highams Park in the London Borough of Waltham Forest, England. They are currently members of the Essex Senior League and groundshare with Walthamstow at Wadham Lodge in Walthamstow.

== History ==
The club was established in 1989 by West Essex Cricket Club member John Spinks in order to give the cricket club members a winter pastime. They joined Division Two of the Ilford and District Football League and won the league's Spartak Cup in their first season. They also finished as runners-up in Division Two and were promoted to the Premier Division. The following season they were Premier Division champions and Fenton Cup winners. After finishing as runners-up in the Premier Division in 1991–92, the 1992–93 season saw the club win the Premier Division title and the League Cup. They then switched to the Essex Business Houses League. The club won the league's Senior Cup in 1996–97. After finishing bottom of the league's Premier Division in 2002–03, they were relegated to Division One. However, a third-place finish in Division One the following season saw them promoted back to the Premier Division. The club were relegated to Division One again at the end of the 2006–07 season.

Despite finishing bottom of Division One in 2007–08, West Essex were not relegated, and went on to win the Division One title the following season, earning promotion back to the Premier Division. In 2010 the club switched to Division One Central & East of the Middlesex County League. They won the division in their first season in the league and were promoted to the Premier Division. They won the Premier Division Cup in 2013–14, and were Premier Division champions in 2015–16 and successfully applied to move up to the Essex Senior League.

== Ground ==
In 2021 West Essex entered a groundsharing agreement with Walthamstow to use Wadham Lodge as their ground. Prior to this, the club had been sharing with Barking at Mayesbrook Park in Dagenham.

== Honours ==
- Middlesex County League
  - Premier Division champions 2015–16
  - Division One (Central & East) champions 2010–11
  - Premier Division Cup winners 2013–14
- Essex Business Houses League
  - Division One champions 2008–09
  - Senior Cup winners 1996–97
- Ilford & District League
  - Premier Division champions 1990–91, 1992–93
  - League Cup winners 1992–93
  - Fenton Cup winners 1990–91
  - Spartak Cup winners 1989–90

== Records ==
- Best FA Cup performance: Preliminary round, 2017–18, 2018–19, 2026–27
- Best FA Vase performance: Second round, 2024–25, 2026–27
