= Frenford F.C. =

Association football club in England

Coordinates: 51.573374°N 0.057408°E

Frenford
- Full name: Frenford Football Club
- Founded: 1942
- Ground: The Jack Carter Centre, Ilford
- Capacity: 2,000
- Chairman: Nick Pegg
- Manager: Imrul Gazi (Joint Manager) Steven Carvell (Joint Player Manager)
- League: Essex Senior League
- 2025–26: Essex Senior League, 19th of 20
Home colours	Away colours

Frenford Football Club is a football club based in Ilford, London, England. Based at the Jack Carter Centre, they are currently members of the Essex Senior League.

== History ==
The football club was established during World War II by the Frenford Sports and Social Club under the name Frenford Senior. They later joined the Ilford and District Football League, and were Premier Division champions in 1975–76. In 1995 the club joined Division Two of the Essex Intermediate League, going on to win the division at the first attempt and earning promotion to Division One.

In 1997–98 Frenford were Division One runners-up. They won the league's Senior Cup in 1999–2000 and the Senior Challenge Cup the following season. The 2003–04 season saw them win the Essex Premier Cup and the Capital Counties Feeder League Trophy. They finished second in Division One again in 2004–05, after which the league was renamed the Essex Olympian League. The club were Division One runners-up for a third time the following season. In 2006–07 they won the Senior Challenge Cup, and from 2007 Division One was renamed Premier Division.

Frenford were Premier Division runners-up in 2008–09. In 2010–11 the club won the Essex Premier Cup, and the following season saw them become Premier Division champions. They retained the title in 2012–13, also winning the Senior Cup and the Senior Challenge Cup. The club went on to win the Senior Challenge Cup again the following season and the Essex Premier Cup in 2015–16. In 2017 the club dropped Senior from their name, and the 2017–18 season saw them win the league's Senior Cup. They moved up to the newly-formed Division One South of the Eastern Counties League the following year.

== Ground ==
Ahead of the 2019–20 season, Frenford entered a groundsharing agreement at Bowers & Pitsea’s Len Salmon Stadium. The stadium has an artificial pitch, which was added in 2018. The stadium was named in 2000 after loyal club servant of forty years, Len Salmon died. Following the early abandonment of the 2019–20 season, due to the COVID-19 pandemic in the United Kingdom, Frenford confirmed the improvement of their existing facilities at the Jack Carter Centre in Ilford.

== Honours ==
- Essex Olympian League
  - Premier Division champions 2011–12, 2012–13
  - Division Two champions 1995–96
  - Senior Cup winners 1999–2000, 2012–13, 2017–18
  - Senior Challenge Cup winners 2000–01, 2006–07, 2012–13, 2013–14
- Essex Premier Cup
  - Winners 2003–04, 2010–11, 2015–16
- Capital Counties Feeder League Trophy
  - Winners 2003–04, 2007–08
- Ilford & District League
  - Premier Division champions 1975–76

== Records ==
- Highest league position: 1st in Eastern Counties League Division One South, 2022–23
