= White Ensign F.C. =

Association football club in England

Coordinates: 51°33′20.318″N 0°47′52.030″E

White Ensign
- Full name: White Ensign Football Club
- Founded: 1951
- Ground: Burroughs Park, Great Wakering
- Capacity: 3,000 (250 seated)
- Chairman: Josh Ferris
- Manager: Ross Mernick
- League: Essex Senior League
- 2025–26: Essex Senior League, 16th of 20
Home colours	Away colours

White Ensign Football Club is a football club based in Southend-on-Sea, Essex, England. They are currently members of the Essex Senior League and play at Burroughs Park in Great Wakering.

== History ==
The club was formed in 1951, and is named after the British naval ensign of the same name, which is incorporated into the club's badge. They played in the Southend Borough Combination until joining Division Two of the Essex Intermediate League in 2002, going on to win the division at the first attempt, earning promotion to Division One. The season also saw them win the Capital Counties Feeder League Trophy and the league's Senior Cup. They were Division One champions the following season, as well as retaining the Senior Cup and winning the Senior Challenge Cup. In 2004–05 the club retained the league title and Senior Challenge Cup. The league was renamed the Essex Olympian League in 2005.

White Ensign won the Capital Counties Feeder League Trophy for a second time in 2005–06. The following season they were Division One champions for a third time, as well as retaining the Capital Counties Feeder Trophy. Division One was then renamed the Premier Division, and the club retained the league title in 2007–08, also winning the Essex Premier Cup. The following season saw them win the Senior Challenge Cup for a third time. However, this marked the end of their period of success and the club finished second-from-bottom of the Premier Division in 2013–14, resulting in relegation to Division One. They were Division One champions the following season and were promoted straight back to the Premier Division. At the end of the 2017–18 season the club moved up to the newly created Division One South of the Eastern Counties League.

In 2021 the club were promoted to the Essex Senior League based on their results in the abandoned 2019–20 and 2020–21 seasons.

== Ground ==
In 2002 White Ensign moved to the Len Forge Centre in Southend after being admitted to the Essex Olympian League. The centre had been the home of the Southend Borough Combination since 1981. A small stand was built in 1985, but was damaged in the Great Storm of 1987. A covered stand was later erected, with two uncovered stands with bench seating built on each side. After White Ensign moved into the ground, the three stands were replaced with two seated stands either side of a new changing room block.

In order to move up to the Essex Senior League in 2018, the club relocated to Basildon Sporting Village, an athletics stadium originally known as the Gloucester Park Bowl. It had originally been planned as a 21,000-capacity stadium in the 1950s (9,000 seated, 12,000 standing), but eventually opened with only a 200-seat uncovered stand. Basildon United moved into the ground in 1967, and a roof was added to the stand. After Basildon United left in 1970, the ground was used by clubs playing in the Southend & District League, Olympian League club Herongate Athletic, and the Essex Eels rugby league club. In 2011 the ground was upgraded, with a 750-seat stand built.

Ahead of the 2019–20 season, White Ensign entered a groundsharing agreement with Great Wakering Rovers at their Burroughs Park ground.

== Honours ==
- Essex Olympian League
  - Champions 2003–04, 2004–05, 2006–07, 2007–08
  - Division Two champions 2002–03
  - Senior Cup winners 2002–03, 2003–04
  - Senior Challenge Cup winners 2003–04, 2004–05, 2007–08
- Essex Premier Cup
  - Winners 2007–08
- Capital Counties Feeder League Trophy
  - Winners 2002–03, 2005–06, 2006–07

== Records ==
- Best FA Cup performance: Preliminary round, 2019–20, 2021–22, 2024–25
- Best FA Vase performance: Fourth round, 2024–25

== See also ==
- White Ensign F.C. players
