= Hullbridge Sports F.C. =

Association football club in England

Coordinates: 51°36′56.46″N 0°37′09.55″E

Hullbridge Sports
- Full name: Hullbridge Sports Football Club
- Nicknames: The Bridge, The Sports
- Founded: 1945
- Ground: Lower Road, Hullbridge
- Capacity: 1,500
- Chairman: Mark Kemp
- Manager: Marc Harrison and Liam Wallace
- League: Essex Senior League
- 2024–25: Essex Senior League, 18th of 20
- Website: hullbridgesportsfc.co.uk
Home colours	Away colours

Hullbridge Sports Football Club is a football club based in Hullbridge, Essex, England. They are currently members of the Essex Senior League and play at Lower Road.

== History ==
The club was established in 1945 as Hullbridge United by a group headed by A.W. Moss, the owner of the Anchor Inn. Playing in green and gold quarters, the colours of the Anchor Inn's flag, the club initially played in the Mid-Essex League. In 1947 they joined the Southend & District League and in 1951–52 won Division Two and the league's French Cup, earning promotion to Division One. In 1953 the club was renamed Hullbridge Sports. Two relegations saw the club playing in Division Three by the mid-1950s, but they were Division Three champions in 1956–57, also winning the Shaw Cup. However, they were relegated back to Division Three two seasons later.

The 1962–63 season saw Hullbridge finish as runners-up in the (renamed) Division Two, earning promotion back to Division One. In 1965–66 they won the Division One title and were promoted to the Premier Division. Although they were relegated back to Division One after finishing bottom of the Premier Division in 1968–69, they returned to the league's top division as Division One runners-up in 1971–72. After another relegation, they were promoted back to the Premier Division after finishing as Division One runners-up in 1978–79.

In 1982 Hullbridge were founder members of the Southend & District Alliance, before moving up to Division Two of the Essex Olympian League in 1984. The club were promoted to Division One in their first season after finishing third in Division Two. They narrowly avoided relegation in their first season in Division One, finishing thirteenth out of fifteen clubs, but finished bottom the following season and were relegated back to Division Two. They won the League Cup in 1987–88. In 1990 Hullbridge moved up to the Essex Senior League. They won the Gordon Brasted Memorial Trophy in 2013–14, and were league champions in 2018–19 season, earning promotion to North Division of the Isthmian League. The club finished bottom of the North Division in 2022–23 and were relegated back to the Essex Senior League.

== Ground ==
The club originally played on a pitch on land owned by A.W. Moss on the junction of Pooles Lane and Long Lane. In the late 1970s the club obtained 16.5 acres of land on Lower Road from Rochford District Council, with the new ground opening in 1980. A clubhouse was officially opened in 1983 and further improvements were made to the ground in 1989 to allow the club to move up to the Essex Senior League, including the installation of floodlights and the construction of a small stand. The stand was later rebuilt and twelve seats were added, with 21 additional seats installed on open steps of terracing behind one goal and 21 on another side of the pitch, enough to fulfil the Essex Senior League's requirements.

== Honours ==
- Essex Senior League
  - Champions 2018–19
- Gordon Brasted Memorial Trophy winners 2013–14
- Essex Olympian League
  - League Cup winners 1987–88
- Southend & District League
  - Division One champions 1965–66
  - Division Two champions 1951–52
  - Division Three champions 1956–57
  - French Cup winners 1951–52
  - Shaw Cup winners 1956–57
- Southend Charity Competition
  - Section B winners 1979–80
  - Section C winners 1950–51, 1965–66

== Records ==
- Best FA Cup performance: Second qualifying round, 2015–16
- Best FA Trophy performance: Second qualifying round, 2021–22
- Best FA Vase performance: Fourth round, 2013–14, 2014–15, 2015–16, 2017–18
- Record attendance: 800 vs Blackburn Rovers, FA Youth Cup, 1999–2000

== See also ==
- Hullbridge Sports F.C. players
