= Walthamstow F.C. =

Association football club in England

Coordinates: 51.5974°N 0.0090°W

Walthamstow
- Full name: Walthamstow Football Club
- Nickname: Stow
- Founded: 1868; 158 years ago, as Leyton F.C.
- Ground: Wadham Lodge, Walthamstow
- Capacity: 3,500
- Owner: Lee Doherty
- Chairman: Andy Perkins
- League: Isthmian League North Division
- 2025–26: Isthmian League North Division, 10th of 22
- Website: https://www.walthamstowfc.com/
| Home colours | Away colours |

Walthamstow Football Club is a semi-professional football club based in Walthamstow, who play in the Isthmian League North Division. They have played under a number of names and were known as Leyton Pennant up until the end of the 2002–03 season, and Waltham Forest until the end of the 2017–18 season.

== History ==
Pennant Football Club was formed as a junior side in 1959 by William Bode, initially joining the South West Essex League. The league's Premier Division title was won by Pennant in 1972–73. Two seasons later the club joined the Metropolitan League, winning the league at the first attempt.

Pennant joined the London Spartan League in 1983, becoming a senior club. They finished 4th in the Senior in their first season, which was sufficient to gain promotion to the Premier Division. In 1988 neighbours Walthamstow Avenue were swallowed up by Redbridge Forest, so Pennant changed their name to Walthamstow Pennant in order to keep the footballing name of Walthamstow alive. The 1988–89 season saw the renamed club win the Spartan League Cup and the installation of floodlights installed at Wadham Lodge.

1990–91 saw Walthamstow Pennant win the Spartan League title by a single point from Barkingside with a 4–0 defeat of Thamesmead Town in their final game. A double was achieved through the defeat of Haringey Borough in the League Cup. However, promotion to the Isthmian League was denied due to inadequate ground facilities and the league's rejection of a proposed groundshare at Leyton-Wingate.

In 1995–96 neighbours Leyton saw no future at their ground and moved to Wadham Lodge, incorporating Walthamstow Pennant. The club was renamed Leyton Pennant, and assumed Leyton's place in the Isthmian League. By 1999–2000 the club was struggling on and off the pitch, resulting in a very poor run of form and relegation to the Isthmian League Second Division. 2000–01 saw great inconsistency in results, accompanied by one of the poorest disciplinary records in the whole of English football and the club were called before the FA to explain themselves.

=== The Ramis years (2003–2006) ===
Badge of Waltham Forest F.C.

Following a few indifferent seasons hovering near the division's relegation zone, local businessman Harry Ramis took over as chairman in February 2003, appointing his brother, ex-professional footballer, Hakan Ramis-Hayrettin as manager and the team avoided relegation. An early decision by the new chairman and his board was to once again change the club's name to Waltham Forest, reflecting the club's location in the borough of Waltham Forest.

Following the removal of the Pennant name from the club, a revived Walthamstow Pennant began playing in the Middlesex County Football League. They merged with Walthamstow Avenue 2000 in 2005, later playing under various names, the most recent being Woodford Town.

The newly named Waltham Forest carried on their form at the beginning of the 2003–04 season winning their first three matches and sitting in the top 4 for much of the first three months of the season. However, the performance levels dipped soon after and the team could only manage to finish 16th.

The team were then moved across to the Southern League Eastern division for two seasons and finished 9th and 8th in consecutive seasons. 2005–06 also saw the club win the Essex Senior Cup; however, the biggest story of the season was an incredible run from the club's Youth team. They reached the last 16 of the FA Youth Cup, even managing to beat Premiership club West Bromwich Albion's Youth team en route, under the guidance of Dave Muir and Martin Fitch.

=== Times of struggle ===
Despite the progress at the club, Chairman Harry Ramis made the decision at the end of the 2005–06 season to step down as chairman. The decision may have been prompted by the fact that his brother Hakan Ramis-Hayrettin had decided to move on to manage Thurrock.

This left the club on the brink of extinction or at the very least facing a drop down to play in the Essex Senior League. However, long serving club secretary Andy Perkins managed to entice Terry Back to the club as chairman in order to provide some finance. Dave Muir and Martyn Fitch were promoted to manage the first team, and promoted a large chunk of the FA Youth Cup team with them. However, results were shambolic and after 4 heavy defeats in their first 4 games Terry Back acted and dismissed both Muir and Fitch.

They were replaced by Danny Honeyball as player-manager, a position that he had held briefly at the club in 2003. Honeyball, along with assistant boss Victor Renner rebuilt the side quickly and after an outstanding run of form, finished 8th and just missed out on the end of season play-offs.

Despite the excellent performance the summer of 2007 was one of turmoil at the club. Victor Renner moved on to Potters Bar Town and took over half of the first team squad with him, and Reserve Team manager Dave Bricknell also departed. Darren Grieves joined as Danny's player-assistant manager, but left after just 6 games. Worse was to follow when Terry Back resigned as chairman on 31 October 2007.

=== Ground difficulties ===
Terry Back's departure as chairman soon saw the 2007–08 season descend into chaos. Danny Honeyball departed as manager in November to take charge at Arlesey Town, and the club ended up having four different managers over the course of the season, with Louis Affor, Kevin Durrant and eventually Ged Searson taking charge.

Boxing promoter Azumah Cofie took over as chairman; however, the club continued to suffer financial difficulties, and worse was to follow. It was eventually announced on 14 March 2008 that the club would leave their home of 12 years, Wadham Lodge, at the end of the season. However, an increase in the rent saw the club move out early, playing their final home game at the Lodge on 24 March 2008, a 1–0 home defeat to Ilford, which put the Stags back in the relegation mire; however, the team eventually secured survival in the penultimate game, a 3–0 victory at Enfield Town.

For the start of the 2008–09 season, Waltham Forest F.C. moved in as tenants of Ilford, and played their home games at Cricklefield Stadium. However, on the field problems remained. With the team near the foot of the table Ged Searson resigned early on in the campaign, and was replaced by Tony Ievoli. At the beginning of 2009 Chairman Azumah Cofie handed the reins to local businessman and friend Isaac Johnson, who immediately appointed Olawale Ojelabi as player-manager. This led to a superb run of form from January to March, which dragged the club out of the relegation places and again Forest survived the drop.

However, Ojelabi left the club on the eve of the 2009–10 season and was replaced by Kevin Head and Bert Hoyte and despite a solid start, and an unbeaten run, Hoyte and Head were sacked and replaced by Phil Miles and the season again soon fell apart, only for Miles himself to be dismissed just before the end of the season as Forest slipped into the bottom third of the league table.

=== Return to the Lodge ===
Tony Mercer was appointed as manager for the start of the 2010–11 season. Mercer was dismissed halfway through the 10–11 season with Ojelabi returning as manager but this was not enough as the side finished 21st out of 22 teams but they were reprieved from relegation.

In July 2013, Waltham Forest F.C. announced that the club would be returning to the borough after a five-year exile in Ilford, Essex, securing a lease at their former ground at the Wadham Lodge Sports Ground on Kitchener Road, Walthamstow. At the end of the season, Waltham Forest were relegated to the Essex Senior League after finishing 23rd out of 24. Difficulties on the pitch continued in the new league, finishing 9th out of 20 on the first season but falling to 17th by the 2018 season before the club was acquired by Lee Doherty.

=== New ownership (2018–present) ===
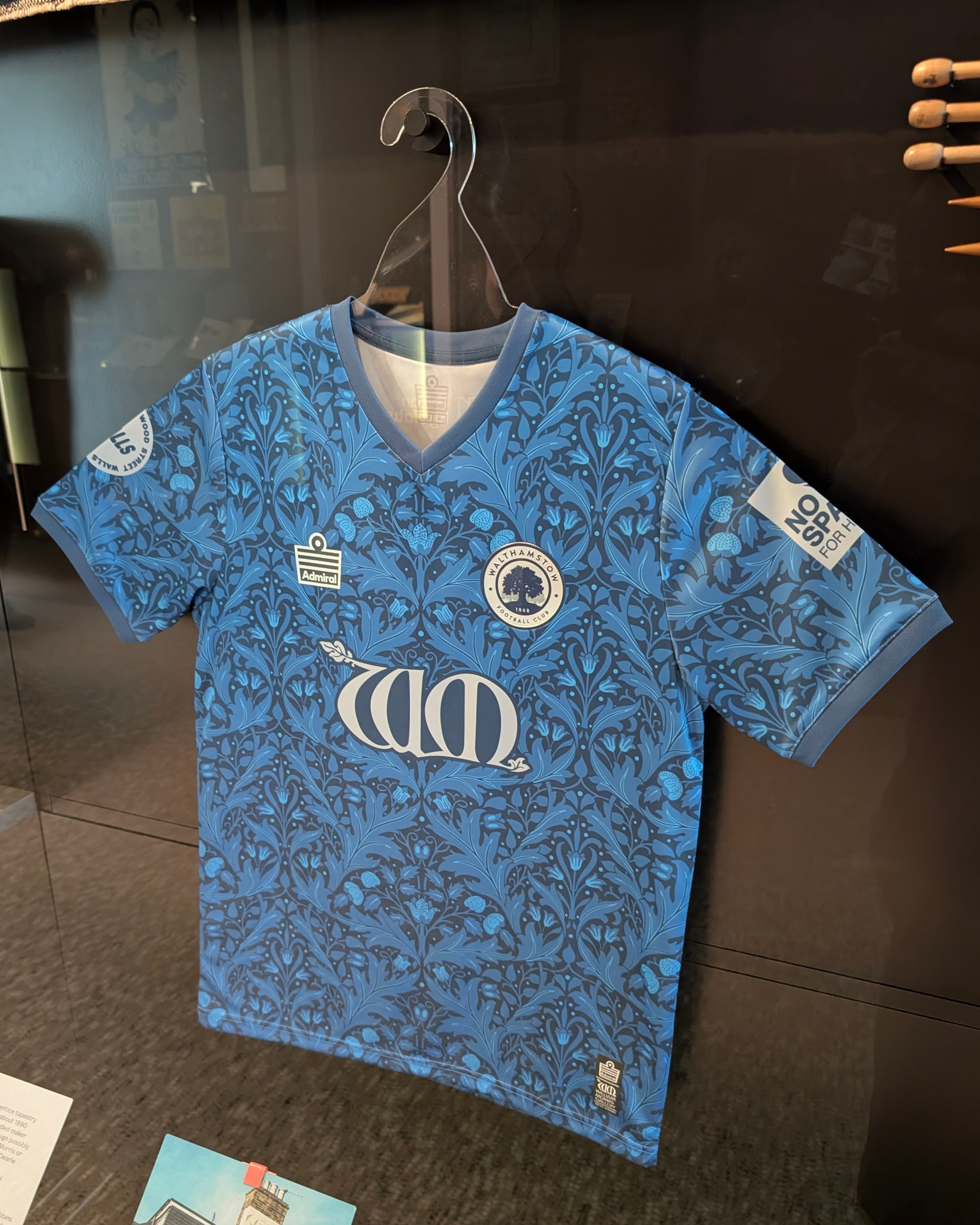
2023–25 home shirt, designed in collaboration with the William Morris Gallery using the "Yare" pattern created around 1892 by John Henry Dearle for Morris & Co.

The club was soon renamed under the new ownership to Walthamstow F.C. They won the 2021–22 Essex Senior Football League, the club's first league title in 37 years, with joint managers John Mackie and Terry Spillane. They were promoted to Division One Central of the Southern League. Mackie and Spillane were dismissed after four games at the start of the 2022–23 season. Former Walthamstow player and Welwyn Garden City manager, Nicky Ironton, was appointed as manager. Walthamstow finished the season in 4th place and qualified for promotion playoffs but were defeated in the semi-final.

Walthamstow were transferred back to the Isthmian League North Division for the 2023–24 season, the club's first appearance since their relegation in 2014. The culmination of a three-year kit-design project, the season's new kits were designed as a collaboration with the William Morris Gallery, Walthamstow being the town where William Morris was born. The collaboration was a world first between a museum and football club. Ironton departed the club after defeat in three consecutive games left the side in 9th place. After a successful interim period with two wins out of three games, interim manager Vinny Murphy was appointed as manager. Murphy led the club to a 6th-place finish followed by a 10th-place finish. On 15 November 2024, Vinny Murphy was replaced by Colin Reid, and then by Gifton Noel-Williams.

== Season-by-season record ==
| Season | Division | Position | Notes |
|---|---|---|---|
| 2017–18 | Essex Senior Football League | 17/21 | |
| 2018–19 | Essex Senior Football League | 3/20 | Renamed to Walthamstow F.C |
| 2019–20 | Essex Senior Football League | – | Season abandoned |
| 2020–21 | Essex Senior Football League | – | Season abandoned |
| 2021–22 | Essex Senior Football League | 1/21 | Promoted |
| 2022–23 | Southern League Division One Central | 4/20 | |
| 2023–24 | Isthmian League North Division | 6/20 | |
| 2024–25 | Isthmian League North Division | 10/22 | |
| 2025–26 | Isthmian League North Division | 10/22 | |
| 2026–27 | Isthmian League North Division | /22 | |

== Records ==
- Best FA Cup performance: Second qualifying round, 2004–05, 2011–12, 2012–13, 2019–20 (replay), 2021–22
- Best FA Trophy performance: Second round, 1998–99, 1999–2000
- Best FA Vase performance: Third round, 2001–02

== Honours ==
- Essex Senior Cup
  - Winners (1): 2005–06
- London Senior Cup:
  - Runners-up (1): 1990–91
- Essex Senior League
  - Winners (1): 2021–22

== See also ==
- Football in London
