= Stanway Rovers F.C. =

Association football club in England

Coordinates: 51.8877°N 0.8448°E

Stanway Rovers
- Full name: Stanway Rovers Football Club
- Nickname: Rovers
- Founded: 1956
- Ground: Hawthorns, Stanway
- Capacity: 1,500 (100 seated)
- Chairman: Jerry Carter
- Manager: Brad Wellmen
- League: Isthmian League Premier Division
- 2025–26: Isthmian League North Division, 4th of 22 (promoted via play-offs)
Home colours	Away colours

Stanway Rovers Football Club is a football club based in Stanway, Colchester, in Essex, England. They are members of the Isthmian League Premier Division and play at The Hawthorns.

== History ==
The original Stanway Rovers club was established in 1922. They initially played in the Kelvedon & District League, before moving up to the Essex & Suffolk Border League and going on to win Division II B in 1927–28. The modern club was established on 10 July 1956. The new club joined Division Two of the Colchester and East Essex League, and by 1960 had reached the Premier Division. They won the Premier Division in 1967–68 and again in 1973–74. The following season saw them reach the final of the Essex Junior Cup, where they lost 1–0 to Takeley.

In 1975 Stanway joined Division One of the Essex & Suffolk Border League, and in 1978 were placed in the new Division Two. The 1978–79 season saw the club finish third and win promotion to Division One. They were later relegated to Division Two, which they won in 1981–82 and again in 1985–86 after another relegation. However, in 1986–87 the club won Division One, and were promoted to the Premier Division. In 1990 and 1991 the club reached the final of the Essex Intermediate Cup, but lost both matches 3–1. In 1991–92 they were Premier Division runners-up, and were promoted to Division One of the Eastern Counties League. In 2005–06 the club won Division One, and were promoted to the Premier Division. They went on to win the League Cup in 2008–09, beating Leiston 4–2 on penalties in the final. They won the cup again in 2011–12 with a 2–1 win over Norwich United in the final.

At the end of the 2017–18 season, Stanway were transferred to the Essex Senior League. However, after a single season in the Essex Senior League, they were moved back to the Eastern Counties League Premier Division. They were transferred back to the Essex Senior League in 2021. In 2023–24 the club won the Errington Challenge Cup and the Peter Butcher Memorial Trophy. The following season saw them win the Essex Senior League, earning promotion to the North Division of the Isthmian League. In 2025–26 the club finished fourth in the North Division, qualifying for the promotion play-offs. After beating Waltham Abbey 2–1 in the semi-finals, they defeated Redbridge on penalties in the final to secure a second successive promotion, this time to the Isthmian League Premier Division.

== Ground ==
The original club played on a field owned by a rose grower, now the location of a garden centre. They later played on pitches on Winstree Road (using a nearby church hall as changing rooms) and then one closer to the church hall.

The modern club was initially based at the King George V playing fields in Lexden, more commonly known as Clairmont Road, before moving to Stanway Secondary School in 1961. In 1979 the club agreed a 99-year lease with the local council for a 4.6-acre (19,000 m^{2}) plot of land. On 18 November 1982 the new clubhouse was opened, and named "Hawthorns". The floodlights at the ground were inaugurated in 1992 in a friendly against Norwich City, ten years after the opening of the clubhouse.

== Honours ==
- Essex Senior League
  - Premier Division champions 2024–25
  - Errington Challenge Cup winners 2023–24
  - Peter Butcher Memorial Trophy winners 2023–24
- Eastern Counties League
  - Division One champions 2005–06
  - League Cup winners 2008–09, 2011–12
- Essex & Suffolk Border League
  - Division One champions 1986–87
  - Division Two champions 1981–82, 1985–86
- Colchester & East Essex League
  - Premier Division champions 1967–68, 1973–74
- Essex & Suffolk Border League
  - Division II B champions 1927–28

== Records ==
- Best FA Cup performance: Second qualifying round, 2008–09, 2015–16, 2025–26
- Best FA Trophy performance: First round, 2025–26
- Best FA Vase performance: Fifth round, 2007–08, 2014–15
- Record attendance: 1,043 vs Redbridge, Isthmian League North Division play-off final, 2 May 2026

== See also ==
- Stanway Rovers F.C. players
- Stanway Rovers F.C. managers
