= Sporting Bengal United F.C. =

Association football club in England

Sporting Bengal United
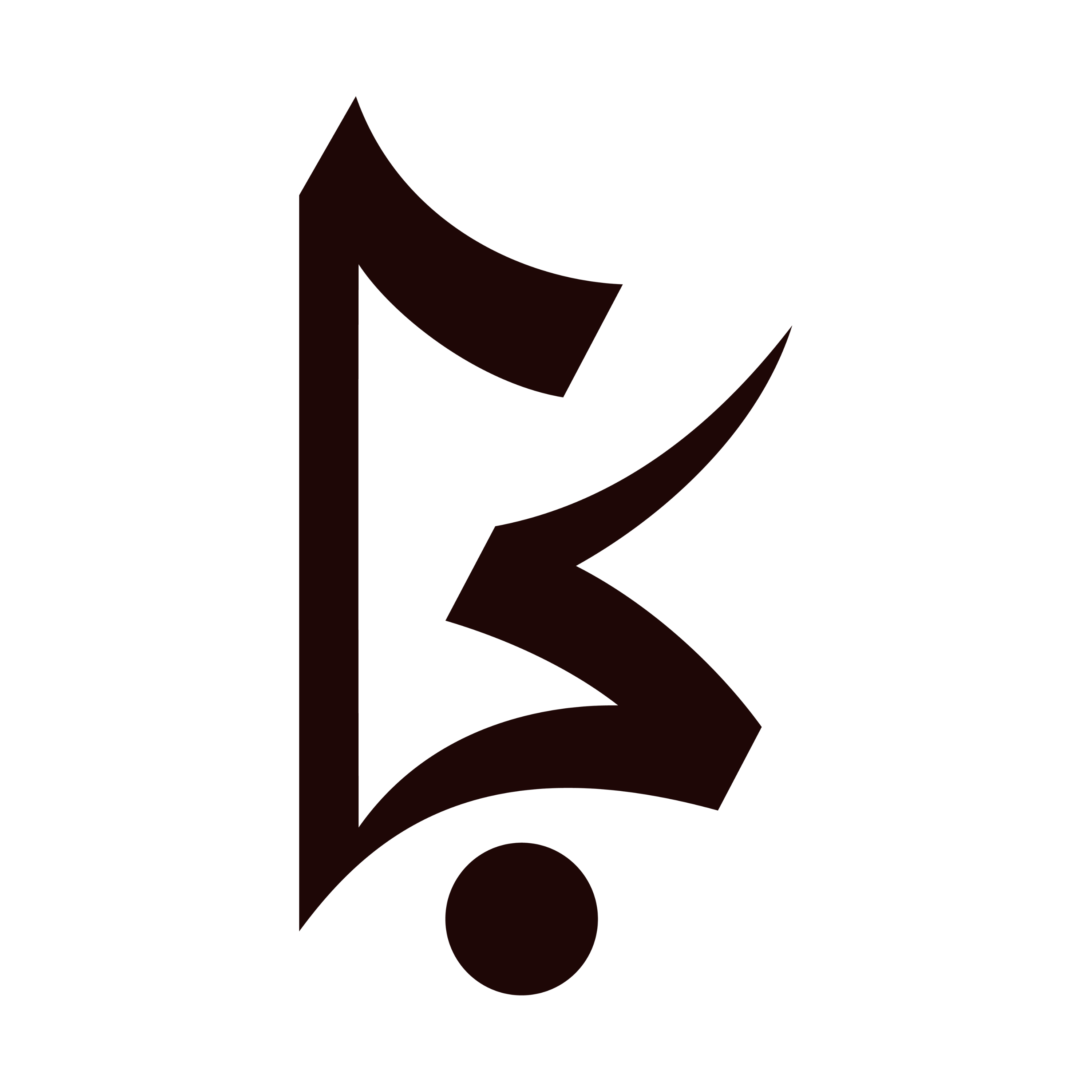
- Full name: Sporting Bengal United Football Club
- Nickname: The Bengal Tigers
- Founded: 1996; 30 years ago
- Stadium: Mile End Stadium
- Capacity: 2,000 (439 seated)
- Owner: Sporting Foundation
- Chairman: Khayrul Alam
- Manager: James Wakeling
- League: Essex Senior League
- 2025–26: Essex Senior League, 17th of 20
- Website: https://sportingfoundation.com/sporting-bengal/
Home colours	Away colours

Sporting Bengal United Football Club is an English football team from Mile End, in the London Borough of Tower Hamlets. They currently play in the Essex Senior League.

== History ==
The club was formed in 1996 to encourage Asian football in London. They initially played in the London Intermediate League until they were granted senior status in 2003 by the London Football Association, following a tour to Bangladesh, where they played the Bangladesh national team. In the same year, Sporting Bengal joined the Kent League. In 2005, they were one of the first Asian teams to play in the FA Cup, along with London APSA of the Essex Senior League, whose roots are in the neighbouring borough of Newham.

In 2011 the club signed up ex Wycombe Wanderers and Wimbledon striker Shahed Ahmed. They were also unusual in being the only Kent League club to play their home matches north of the River Thames, outside the traditional borders of Kent.

In 2016–17, the club reached the first qualifying round stage of the FA Cup for the first time under manager Imrul Gazi. In 2021, Shipon Miah was appointed as manager. The club suffered relegation in the 2021–22 season, going down to the Eastern Counties League but achieved promotion via the playoffs the following season under the management of Steve Clark after beating Stanway Pegasus in a penalty shootout in the final to return to the Essex Senior League. The club then achieved a second consecutive promotion during the 2023–24 season following a 3–1 win over Romford in the Essex Senior League playoff finals. This resulted in Sporting Bengal achieving step 4 status for the first time in its history. However, in the 2024–25 season they finished bottom of the Isthmian League North Division following the late departure of Steve Clark in March 2025, when assistant Blaine Horne took control the club were relegated back to the Essex Senior League.

== Records ==
- Best league position: 22nd, Isthmian League North Division - 2024–25
- Best FA Cup performance: First qualifying round, 2016–17
- Best FA Trophy performance: First qualifying round, 2024–25
- Best FA Vase performance: Third round, 2011–12, 2022–23
- Attendance: 4,235 vs Mohammedan Sporting Club

== See also ==
- Football in London
