= Saffron Walden Town F.C. =

Association football club in England

Coordinates: 52°01′38.23″N 0°14′23.99″E

Saffron Walden Town
- Full name: Saffron Walden Town Football Club
- Nicknames: The Bloods; The Saffron; The Wardens
- Founded: 1872
- Ground: Catons Lane, Saffron Walden
- Chairman: Jamie Sharp
- Manager: John Hughes
- League: Essex Senior League
- 2024–25: Essex Senior League, 6th of 20
Home colours	Away colours

Saffron Walden Town Football Club is a football club based in Saffron Walden, Essex, England. They are currently members of the Essex Senior League and play at Catons Lane.

== History ==
The club was established as Saffron Walden in 1872 and are the oldest senior football club in Essex. They entered the FA Cup in 1876–77, but withdrew after being drawn against holders Wanderers as they could not afford to travel. Two years later they made their first appearance, losing 5–0 to Upton Park in the first round.

In 1882 the club were founder members of the Essex County Football Association. In 1890 club secretary Arthur Smith, the headmaster of the local Boy's National School, negotiated an annual fee of £3 with Lord Braybrooke for the use of a piece of land in Loft's Lane; previously the club had played on the town common, but had been unable to charge spectators an entrance fee. The club reached the final of the Essex Junior Cup in 1894–94, but lost 3–0 to Barking Excelsior. In 1896–97 they reached the final again, beating Leytonstone 6–1 in a replay.

In 1899 they entered the Haverhill and District League, which they won in 1907–08, 1922–23, 1923–24, 1928–29, 1929–30 and 1933–34. The club also entered the Stansted and District League, the Cambridgeshire League and Hertfordshire and Essex Border League during the same era, winning the Stanstead & District League on seven occasions and the Border League once. In 1926 the club reached the final of the Essex Junior Cup, where a record crowd of 6,000 saw them lose 2–1 to Rainham Athletic.

The club moved to the Essex & Suffolk Border League and the North Essex League, before joining the Spartan League in 1933. In 1936–37 they won Division Two.

After World War II the club moved to the Parthenon League in 1954, and, after a single season, left to join the Hertfordshire County League.

In 1971 the club were founder members of the Essex Senior League. After winning the league in 1973–74, they switched to the Eastern Counties League, which they won in 1982–83. After finishing sixth the following season, the club joined Division Two North of the Isthmian League. In 1996 the club dropped back into the Essex Senior League, following a rule change which deemed the sloping pitch at Catons Lane to be unfit for the league. They won the league in 1999–2000 and were runners-up the following year, but ongoing work on the ground prevented the club from being promoted.

The club tried to transfer to the Eastern Counties League, but was prevented from doing so by the Essex Senior League. In order to fulfil their wish, in 2003–04 the club spent a season outside the league system, playing just friendlies, before rejoining Division One of the Eastern Counties League in 2004. In August 2011 they resigned from the league claiming that their financial situation meant that they could not guarantee that they would complete the 2011–12 season. In 2012 they rejoined the Eastern Counties League.

On 4 July 2012, members voted to convert the club into a Community Benefit Society. They were promoted to the Premier Division at the end of the 2014–15 season after finishing third in Division One.

At the end of the 2017–18 season Saffron Walden were transferred to the Essex Senior League. In 2019–20 the club were top of the table when the league was abandoned due to the COVID-19 pandemic. In 2021–22 they were league runners-up, qualifying for a promotion play-off against Witham Town, which they lost 3–0.

== Ground ==
In 1890, the club moved to The Meadow on Catons Lane. During the 1927–28 season, the first stand at the ground was erected. In 1937, the main stand at the ground was built. In 1954, the first stand at the ground, built from corrugated iron, was replaced. 1966 FIFA World Cup winner Martin Peters opened the new clubhouse in 1973. Six years later, floodlights were added to Catons Lane, with a friendly against Norwich City inaugurating them, in front of a crowd of 1,500.

== Honours ==
- Eastern Counties League
  - Champions 1982–83
- Essex Senior League
  - Champions 1973–74, 1999–2000
- Spartan League
  - Division Two champions 1936–37
- Haverhill and District League
  - Champions 1907–08, 1922–23, 1923–24, 1928–29, 1929–30, 1933–34
- Stansted and District League
  - Champions 1907–08, 1908–09, 1909–10, 1911–12, 1920–21, 1922–23, 1923–24
- Hertfordshire and Essex Border League
  - Champions 1926–27 (shared)
- Essex Senior Challenge Trophy
  - Winners 1983, 1984, 1985
- Essex Junior Cup
  - Winners 1897

== Records ==
- Best FA Cup performance: First round, 1876–77, 1878–79, 1880-81
- Best FA Vase performance: Fifth round, 1990–91
- Most appearances: Les Page, 538
- Most goals: Alec Ramsey, 192
