= Little Oakley F.C. =

Association football club in England

Coordinates: 51°55′15″N 1°13′46″E

Little Oakley
- Full name: Little Oakley Football Club
- Nickname: The Acorns
- Founded: 1947
- Ground: Memorial Ground, Little Oakley
- Chairman: Michael Good
- Manager: Paul Phelan
- League: Isthmian League North Division
- 2025–26: Essex Senior League, 1st of 20 (promoted)
Home colours

Little Oakley Football Club is a football club based in Little Oakley, Essex, England. They are currently members of the Isthmian League North Division and play at the Memorial Ground.

== History ==
Despite evidence of a football club in Little Oakley prior to World War I, the club were founded in 1947 as Little Oakley War Memorial. In 1974, the club changed their name to the current guise of Little Oakley. In the 1987–88 season, the club were initially accepted into the Eastern Counties League Division One for the following season, before failing ground grading.

The club was promoted as champions of the Essex & Suffolk Border League in 2017, joining the Eastern Counties League. It was the club's fifth Premier Division title.

In 2021, the club were promoted to the Essex Senior League based on their results in the abandoned 2019–20 and 2020–21 seasons. On the final day of the 2025–26 season, Little Oakley won the Essex Senior League, gaining promotion to step four for the first time in their history.

== Ground ==
Following the club's promotion to the Eastern Counties League, the War Memorial Ground required several upgrades. The ground was enclosed and the pitch surrounded with railing and hardstanding. Floodlights were installed, with a small covered stand built at the clubhouse end.

== Honours ==
- Essex Senior League
  - Champions 2025–26
- Essex and Suffolk Border League
  - Premier Division champions 1986–87, 1987–88, 1992–93, 1993–94, 2003–04, 2016–17
  - Division One champions 1985–86
