= Buckhurst Hill F.C. =

Coordinates: 51°37′35″N 0°3′23″E

Buckhurst Hill
- Full name: Buckhurst Hill Football Club
- Nickname: Stags
- Founded: 1985; 41 years ago
- Ground: Roding Lane, Buckhurst Hill
- Chairman: Simon Cornwell
- Manager: Mark Williams
- League: Isthmian League North Division
- 2025–26: Essex Senior League, 4th of 20 (promoted via play-offs)
Home colours	Away colours

Buckhurst Hill Football Club is a football club based in Buckhurst Hill, England. They are currently members of the Isthmian League North Division and play at Roding Lane, Buckhurst Hill.

== History ==
Buckhurst Hill were formed in 1985 by Richard Brand and Alfie Sacre in a bid to provide Buckhurst Hill with youth football. In 2004, Buckhurst Hill joined the Hertfordshire Senior County League. In 2008, the club joined the Essex Olympian League. In 2017, the club won Division One, gaining promotion to the Premier Division, which they also won in 2018. In 2021, the club was admitted into the Eastern Counties League Division One South. In their first season at step 6, they finished as runners-up, losing only two league matches in the season. At the end of the season Buckhurst Hill were allocated a place in the Essex senior league. Buckhurst Hill entered the FA Vase for the first time in 2021–22. In 2022/23 season, Buckhurst Hill entered the FA Cup first the first time. In 2025/26 season Buckhurst Hill finished fourth in the Essex Senior League, their highest ever placing and then went on to beat Barking in the play off final, to earn a place in the Isthmian North League.

== Ground ==
The club currently play at Roding Lane in Buckhurst Hill. In 2020, the club won permission from Epping Forest District Council to erect a 100-seater stand, a 100-capacity standing area and six floodlights. A new standing area for 100 people was erected at the beginning of the 2022/23 season.

== Records ==
- Best FA Cup performance: Second qualifying round, 2026–27
- Best FA Vase performance: Third round, 2021–22
