= Takeley F.C. =

Association football club in England

Coordinates: 51°51′57″N 0°16′03″E

Takeley
- Full name: Takeley Football Club
- Founded: 1900
- Ground: Station Road, Takeley
- Capacity: 2,000
- Chairman: Andrew Silvester
- Manager: Kieran Amos
- League: Isthmian League North Division
- 2025–26: Isthmian League North Division, 17th of 22
- Website: www.takeleyfc.co.uk
Home colours	Away colours

Takeley Football Club is an English football club based in Takeley, Essex. The club are currently members of the Isthmian League North Division.

== History ==
Despite originally being thought to have been founded in 1903, the club were founded in 1900. Following World War I, the club joined the Bishop's Stortford, Stansted and District League. After winning the league three consecutive times between 1975 and 1977, Takeley joined the Essex Olympian League in 1978. They won the league in 1987–88 and 2001–02, and in 2006–07, the club won the Essex Premier Cup. After finishing as runners-up in 2007–08, the club was accepted into the Essex Senior League, finishing third in their first season. They also achieved third-place finishes in 2011–12 and 2012–13.

On 3 May 2025, Takeley gained promotion to the Isthmian League North Division, after a 2–0 win against Woodford Town in the Essex Senior League play-off final.

== Ground ==
Upon formation, the club played in pitches situated in Hatfield Forest, before later moving to Station Road. In 2001, a clubhouse was built at the ground, with the ground being fully enclosed during the 2003–04 season. In 2009, a new stand was erected at Station Road.

== Honours ==
- Essex Olympian League
  - Division One champions 1987–88, 2001–02
  - Division Two champions 1993–94
- Essex Premier Cup
  - Winners 2006–07
- Essex Senior Football League
  - Play-off winners 2024–25
- Bishop's Stortford, Stansted and District League
  - Premier Division champions 1968–69, 1974–75, 1975–76, 1976–77
  - First Division champions 1964–65
  - Second Division champions 1963–64

== Records ==
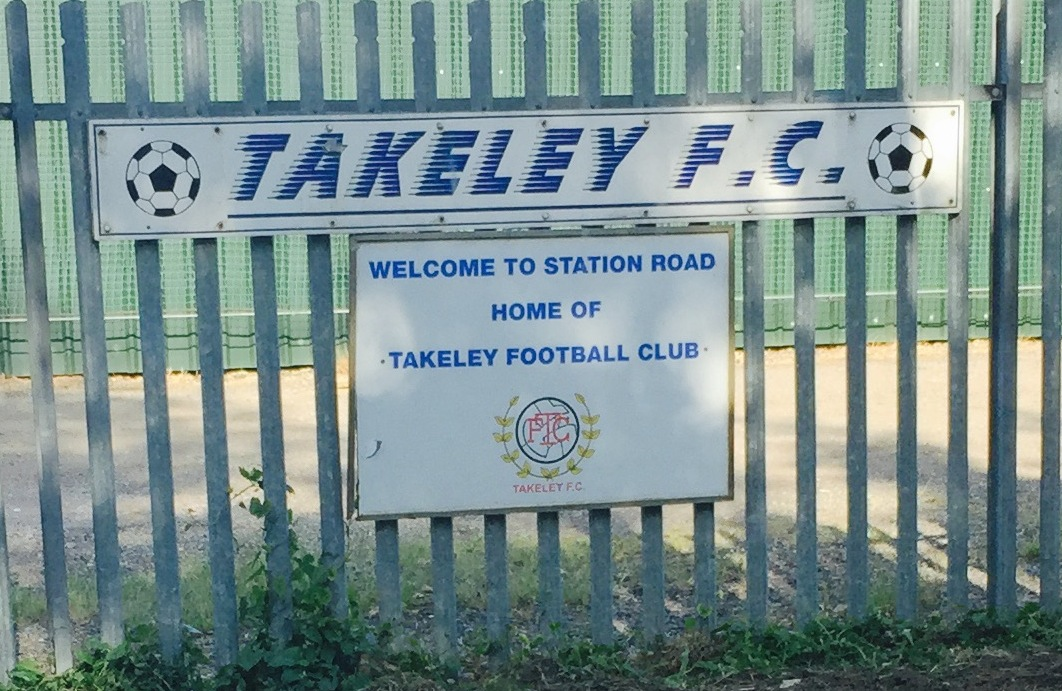
Takeley F.C. play at Station Road.

- Best FA Cup performance: Preliminary round, 2012–13, 2024–25, 2025–26
- Best FA Trophy performance: First round, 2026–27
- Best FA Vase performance: Third round, 2024–25
- Record attendance: 1,003 vs Woodford Town, Essex Senior League play-off final, 3 May 2025
