= 2026–27 Southern Football League =

The 2026–27 Southern Football League season is the 124th in the history of the Southern League since its establishment in 1894. The league has two Premier divisions (Central and South) at Step 3 of the National League System (NLS) and two Division One divisions (Central and South) at Step 4. These correspond to levels 7 and 8 of the English football league system.

The allocations for Steps 3 and 4 this season were announced by The Football Association (FA) on 14 May 2026. There will be 88 teams in the Southern League, 22 in each of the four divisions.

== Premier Division Central ==
Southern Football League Premier Division Central
- Season: 2026–27

The Premier Division Central comprises 22 teams, 15 of which competed in the previous season.

=== Team changes ===
To the Premier Division Central

Promoted from Division One Central

- Hitchin Town
- Leighton Town

Promoted from the Northern Premier League Division One Midlands

- Anstey Nomads
- Racing Club Warwick

Relegated from the National League North

- Leamington
- Peterborough Sports

Transferred from the Northern Premier League Premier Division

- Rushall Olympic

From the Premier Division Central

Promoted to the National League North

- Harborough Town
- Spalding United

Transferred to the Northern Premier League Premier Division

- Quorn

Relegated to Division One Central

- Royston Town

Relegated to the Isthmian League North Division

- AFC Sudbury

Relegated to the Northern Premier League Division One Midlands

- Barwell
- St Ives Town

=== Premier Division Central table ===
Pos	Team	Pld	W	D	L	GF	GA	GD	Pts	Promotion, qualification or relegation
1	Real Bedford	19	13	3	3	48	24	+24	42	Promotion to the National League North
2	Bromsgrove Sporting	17	12	4	1	37	19	+18	40	Qualification for the play-off semi-finals (Note: Six teams play for one spot and promotion to the National League North)
3	Bury Town	20	12	4	4	38	28	+10	40	Qualification for the play-off semi-finals
4	Needham Market	18	9	5	4	38	24	+14	32	Qualification for the play-off quarter-finals
5	Kettering Town	19	9	5	5	32	21	+11	32	Qualification for the play-off quarter-finals
6	Rushall Olympic	20	10	2	8	36	31	+5	32	Qualification for the play-off quarter-finals
7	Anstey Nomads	17	8	6	3	36	27	+9	30	Qualification for the play-off quarter-finals
8	Peterborough Sports	18	8	6	4	34	29	+5	30	
9	Alvechurch	16	8	5	3	29	15	+14	29	
10	Halesowen Town	17	8	3	6	28	27	+1	27	
11	Stratford Town	20	6	8	6	29	32	−3	26	
12	Stourbridge	17	7	4	6	24	24	0	25	
13	Leiston	18	6	4	8	33	37	−4	22	
14	Racing Club Warwick	18	5	6	7	25	25	0	21	
15	Worcester City	16	5	4	7	19	24	−5	19	
16	Redditch United	16	4	6	6	24	26	−2	18	
17	Hitchin Town	17	4	5	8	23	27	−4	17	
18	Leamington	20	4	5	11	32	39	−7	17	
19	Banbury United	19	4	5	10	20	33	−13	17	Relegation to Step 4
20	Bishop's Stortford	18	4	2	12	20	32	−12	14	Relegation to Step 4
21	Leighton Town	17	1	4	12	20	41	−21	7	Relegation to Step 4
22	Stamford	17	1	2	14	6	46	−40	5	Relegation to Step 4

Updated to match(es) played on 21 November 2026. Source: Southern League, Non League Matters
Rules for classification: 1) points; 2) goal difference; 3) number of goals scored; 4) number of matches won; 5) head-to-head results

=== Results table ===
Home \ Away	ALV	ANS	BAN	BIS	BRO	BRY	HAL	HIT	KET	LEA	LEG	LST	NHM	PBS	RCW	RBE	RED	RUS	STA	STO	STR	WOR
Alvechurch	—	2–2				0–1							2–0		2–0				4–0	0–0		3–1
Anstey Nomads	2–2	—	3–0	4–1					1–0		2–0	1–1				1–2		3–2				
Banbury United	1–0		—							0–1	1–0	1–2			2–1	1–3			3–2	1–1	2–3	0–3
Bishop's Stortford	0–3		0–0	—		1–2		2–0		3–1					2–4	3–1			0–1		0–1	
Bromsgrove Sporting		1–2	1–1	3–0	—	1–0			2–1	1–1		3–2						2–1			2–2	
Bury Town			2–2	1–1		—	1–0	1–0	2–3	3–0		4–3	0–5					1–1		2–0		
Halesowen Town	1–1	3–5		1–0			—	2–1		3–2	4–2					0–2		1–0				
Hitchin Town		3–3				5–1		—	1–1		1–0		1–3	0–1			1–1		3–0	1–1		
Kettering Town	1–0	4–1					1–1		—			4–0	0–0	0–0			2–1	3–2	5–0		1–0	
Leamington		1–1			2–3		0–3	4–0	0–1	—		2–2	1–2	2–4			2–2		6–1			1–1
Leighton Town					1–5	2–3		1–3	1–1		—			2–4				0–3			2–2	2–1
Leiston	1–3			3–1							4–2	—		0–2		1–4	3–1	1–2			1–0	
Needham Market		1–1	2–0	2–1	1–3		0–1				1–1		—	3–3					4–0	4–1		2–0
Peterborough Sports		2–1	4–2		1–3							2–5		—		0–2	2–2	4–2	1–1	1–2		
Racing Club Warwick		2–3				1–3	5–1	1–1				0–0		1–1	—	1–1	1–2				0–0	2–2
Real Bedford					1–1	2–2				4–2	3–2	3–2				—	2–1	3–0		0–1	6–1	
Redditch United				3–1	1–2		3–1				1–1		3–3	0–1	2–1		—					
Rushall Olympic	0–1		3–2	2–1			1–1	2–1	3–2	3–1			5–3		0–1			—				1–0
Stamford				0–3		0–1	0–4								1–2	0–4		0–3	—		0–0	
Stourbridge	1–2								4–1	0–2	2–1	2–2			0–1	1–4	3–1		2–0	—		
Stratford Town	4–4		2–1		2–3	1–3	3–1	3–1		2–1			1–2	1–1			0–0				—	1–1
Worcester City			0–0		0–1	0–5			2–1						2–1	4–1			1–0	1–3		—

Updated to match(es) played on 21 November 2026. Source: Southern League
Legend: Blue = home team win; Yellow = draw; Red = away team win.

=== Stadia and locations ===
Locations of the Premier Division Central clubs
Locations of the Premier Division Central clubs
Locations of the Premier Division Central clubs (Worcestershire and surroundings)
Locations of the Premier Division Central clubs (Worcestershire and surroundings)
Locations of the Premier Division Central clubs (Worcestershire and surroundings)

Club	Location	Stadium	Capacity
Alvechurch	Alvechurch	Lye Meadow	3,000
Anstey Nomads	Anstey	Cropston Road	1,000
Banbury United	Banbury	Spencer Stadium	3,116
Bishop's Stortford	Bishop's Stortford	Woodside Park	4,525
Bromsgrove Sporting	Bromsgrove	Victoria Ground	3,500
Bury Town	Bury St Edmunds	Ram Meadow	3,500
Halesowen Town	Halesowen	The Grove	3,150
Hitchin Town	Hitchin	Top Field	3,529
Kettering Town	Kettering	Latimer Park (groundshare with Burton Park Wanderers)	3,029
Leamington	Leamington	New Windmill Ground	3,050
Leighton Town	Leighton Buzzard	Bell Close	2,800
Leiston	Leiston	Victory Road	2,250
Needham Market	Needham Market	Bloomfields	4,000
Peterborough Sports	Peterborough	Lincoln Road	2,300
Racing Club Warwick	Warwick	Townsend Meadow	2,100
Real Bedford	Bedford	McMullen Park	1,500
Redditch United	Redditch	The Valley	5,000
Rushall Olympic	Walsall (Rushall)	Dales Lane	1,400
Stamford	Stamford	Borderville Sports Centre	2,000
Stourbridge	Stourbridge	War Memorial Athletic Ground	2,035
Stratford Town	Stratford-upon-Avon	Knights Lane	2,000
Worcester City	Worcester	Sixways Stadium	12,067

== Premier Division South ==
Southern Football League Premier Division South
- Season: 2026–27

The Premier Division South comprises 22 teams, 16 of which competed in the previous season.

=== Team changes ===
To the Premier Division South

Promoted from Division One South

- Frome Town
- Malvern Town

Promoted from the Isthmian League South Central Division

- Hanworth Villa

Relegated from the National League South

- Bath City
- Chippenham Town

Transferred from the Isthmian League Premier Division

- Chichester City

From the Premier Division South

Promoted to the National League South

- Farnham Town
- Walton & Hersham

Relegated to Division One South

- Dorchester Town
- Hungerford Town
- Tiverton Town
- Weymouth

=== Premier Division South table ===
Pos	Team	Pld	W	D	L	GF	GA	GD	Pts	Promotion, qualification or relegation
1	Uxbridge	17	12	3	2	35	15	+20	39	Promotion to the National League South
2	Hanworth Villa	18	11	4	3	37	22	+15	37	Qualification for the play-off semi-finals (Note: Six teams play for one spot and promotion to the National League South)
3	Plymouth Parkway	17	10	2	5	36	21	+15	32	Qualification for the play-off semi-finals
4	Bath City	17	10	2	5	23	15	+8	32	Qualification for the play-off quarter-finals
5	Poole Town	19	10	2	7	29	27	+2	32	Qualification for the play-off quarter-finals
6	Chertsey Town	18	8	6	4	37	30	+7	30	Qualification for the play-off quarter-finals
7	Chichester City	18	9	2	7	32	30	+2	29	Qualification for the play-off quarter-finals
8	Taunton Town	16	9	1	6	44	27	+17	28	
9	Wimborne Town	15	7	4	4	25	11	+14	25	
10	Gosport Borough	19	7	4	8	30	30	0	25	
11	Sholing	17	5	7	5	22	23	−1	22	
12	Berkhamsted	15	6	3	6	22	21	+1	21	
13	Hanwell Town	18	5	6	7	24	27	−3	21	
14	Havant & Waterlooville	19	6	3	10	29	34	−5	21	
15	Frome Town	18	5	5	8	27	29	−2	20	
16	Basingstoke Town	18	5	5	8	29	35	−6	20	
17	Gloucester City	17	4	7	6	23	26	−3	19	
18	Yate Town	18	4	7	7	20	32	−12	19	
19	Evesham United	19	6	1	12	26	41	−15	19	Relegation to Step 4
20	Chippenham Town	19	4	6	9	22	35	−13	18	Relegation to Step 4
21	Bracknell Town	19	4	4	11	20	41	−21	16	Relegation to Step 4
22	Malvern Town	17	4	2	11	24	44	−20	14	Relegation to Step 4

Updated to match(es) played on 21 November 2026. Source: Southern League, Non League Matters
Rules for classification: 1) points; 2) goal difference; 3) number of goals scored; 4) number of matches won; 5) head-to-head results

=== Results table ===
Home \ Away	BAS	BAT	BER	BRA	CHE	CHC	CHP	EVE	FRO	GLO	GOS	HWL	HWV	H&W	MAL	PLY	POO	SHO	TAU	UXB	WIM	YAT
Basingstoke Town	—	1–1		2–1			2–1	2–4			1–1		1–1		4–1	2–0				0–2		
Bath City		—					2–0				1–2		1–0	1–0	2–1	1–1	1–0		0–3	1–2		
Berkhamsted			—						4–1			1–0	1–2	2–0			2–3	1–1		1–0		
Bracknell Town				—	1–2	1–0			2–2	3–2	1–3		1–4	2–1	0–0			3–1				
Chertsey Town	4–3		4–1		—	2–1	2–2	2–0	1–2						5–0		1–3					1–1
Chichester City	2–2	2–1	3–1		2–2	—	4–0						1–2	3–2		3–1	1–2					
Chippenham Town			1–2	1–1			—	4–2	0–2		2–0					3–2	1–4	2–2				1–1
Evesham United		0–2	0–0	3–2		3–0	2–0	—	0–4		5–3					1–3			1–4			0–3
Frome Town		1–0				2–3			—	0–1	1–2	2–2	2–3					1–1	2–2		2–0	
Gloucester City	1–1		2–2		0–1			1–2		—		1–0			3–2	1–1		0–0				
Gosport Borough	4–0			1–1	1–1						—	3–2	0–1	1–2	4–2		1–3		3–1	1–1		
Hanwell Town	2–1	0–2			1–1	0–2		2–1				—		6–1		2–1		0–0				
Hanworth Villa					4–1	2–1	1–1	4–1		1–3			—			4–2	2–1		2–0			2–3
Havant & Waterlooville	4–1			3–0					1–0	3–3		1–1	2–2	—			0–1		1–0	0–2		4–0
Malvern Town							1–2		2–0	5–2		2–2		1–0	—						0–3	3–2
Plymouth Parkway				7–0					2–0	1–0				2–1	3–0	—	2–0			3–1	2–1	
Poole Town	0–2			1–0	2–2			3–1				3–0					—	0–1	0–5	1–1	0–3	2–1
Sholing		1–2	2–0		2–4	2–3	1–1	1–0			1–0				4–2	1–3		—				
Taunton Town	4–3	1–3	2–1	4–0	4–1							1–2			5–2				—			
Uxbridge	2–1					5–0	2–0	1–0		2–1		4–2			3–0				5–4	—	0–0	2–0
Wimborne Town		0–2		2–0		0–1	2–0			1–1	3–0		0–0	6–3							—	4–0
Yate Town			0–3	2–1					3–3	1–1	1–0	0–0						1–1	1–4		0–0	—

Updated to match(es) played on 21 November 2026. Source: Southern League
Legend: Blue = home team win; Yellow = draw; Red = away team win.

=== Stadia and locations ===
Locations of the Premier Division South clubs
Greater London and surroundings Premier Division South clubs

Club	Location	Stadium	Capacity
Basingstoke Town	Basingstoke	Winklebury Football Complex (Basingstoke)	2,000
Bath City	Bath (Twerton)	Twerton Park	8,840
Berkhamsted	Berkhamsted	Broadwater	1,950
Bracknell Town	Sandhurst	SB Stadium	1,950
Chertsey Town	Chertsey	Alwyns Lane	2,500
Chichester City	Chichester	Oaklands Park	2,000
Chippenham Town	Chippenham	Hardenhuish Park	3,000
Evesham United	Evesham	Jubilee Stadium	3,000
Frome Town	Frome	Badgers Hill	3,000
Gloucester City	Gloucester	Meadow Park	4,000
Gosport Borough	Gosport	Privett Park	4,500
Hanwell Town	London (Perivale)	Powerday Stadium	3,000
Hanworth Villa	London (Hanworth)	Rectory Meadow	1,800
Havant & Waterlooville	Havant	Westleigh Park	5,300
Malvern Town	Malvern	Langland Stadium	2,500
Plymouth Parkway	Plymouth	Bolitho Park	3,500
Poole Town	Poole	The BlackGold Stadium	2,500
Sholing	Southampton (Sholing)	Universal Stadium	2,500
Taunton Town	Taunton	Wordsworth Drive	3,000
Uxbridge	London (West Drayton)	Honeycroft	3,770
Wimborne Town	Wimborne Minster	The Cuthbury	3,250
Yate Town	Yate	Lodge Road	2,000

== Division One Central ==
Southern Football League Division One Central
- Season: 2026–27

Division One Central comprises 22 teams, 16 of which competed in the previous season.

=== Team changes ===
To Division One Central

Promoted from the Spartan South Midlands League Premier Division

- Haringey Borough
- Winslow United

Relegated from the Premier Division Central

- Royston Town

Relegated from the Isthmian League Premier Division

- Potters Bar Town

Transferred from Division One South

- Didcot Town

Transferred from the Isthmian League North Division

- Waltham Abbey

From Division One Central

Promoted to the Premier Division Central

- Hitchin Town
- Leighton Town

Relegated to the Combined Counties League Premier Division North

- Northwood
- Rayners Lane

Relegated to the Spartan South Midlands League Premier Division

- Enfield

Merged with Dunstable Town

- AFC Dunstable

=== Division One Central table ===
Pos	Team	Pld	W	D	L	GF	GA	GD	Pts	Promotion, qualification or relegation
1	Didcot Town	18	13	1	4	42	19	+23	40	Promotion to Premier Division Central
2	Winslow United	18	12	3	3	47	25	+22	39	Qualification for the play-off semi-finals (Note: Six teams play for one spot and promotion to Step 3)
3	Royston Town	19	10	6	3	42	25	+17	36	Qualification for the play-off semi-finals
4	Potters Bar Town	20	10	5	5	40	27	+13	35	Qualification for the play-off quarter-finals
5	Marlow	17	10	3	4	38	28	+10	33	Qualification for the play-off quarter-finals
6	Waltham Abbey	15	10	2	3	44	27	+17	32	Qualification for the play-off quarter-finals
7	Haringey Borough	18	9	4	5	32	32	0	31	Qualification for the play-off quarter-finals
8	Welwyn Garden City	19	9	3	7	39	30	+9	30	
9	Stotfold	19	7	8	4	24	21	+3	29	
10	Thame United	14	9	1	4	35	21	+14	28	
11	Biggleswade	18	8	3	7	32	31	+1	27	
12	Biggleswade Town	19	7	4	8	31	26	+5	25	
13	London Lions	20	8	1	11	33	43	−10	25	
14	Milton Keynes Irish	20	6	3	11	27	43	−16	21	
15	Beaconsfield Town	20	6	3	11	23	44	−21	21	
16	Ware	18	4	8	6	25	35	−10	20	
17	Hertford Town	19	5	5	9	25	38	−13	20	
18	Barton Rovers	21	5	5	11	26	41	−15	20	
19	Leverstock Green	20	4	7	9	26	30	−4	19	Relegation to Step 5
20	Aylesbury United	19	4	3	12	34	48	−14	15	Relegation to Step 5
21	Hadley	20	4	2	14	25	39	−14	14	Relegation to Step 5
22	Flackwell Heath	19	3	4	12	24	41	−17	13	Relegation to Step 5

Updated to match(es) played on 22 November 2026. Source: Southern League, Non League Matters
Rules for classification: 1) points; 2) goal difference; 3) number of goals scored; 4) number of matches won; 5) head-to-head results

=== Results table ===
Home \ Away	AYU	BAR	BEA	BGW	BWT	DID	FLA	HAD	HAR	HER	LSG	LOL	MLW	MKI	PBT	ROY	STO	THM	WAL	WAR	WGC	WIN
Aylesbury United	—	0–2		2–2		0–1	1–0		3–3	2–4	2–2		2–3			2–3			2–3			4–2
Barton Rovers		—			1–0	0–1		4–3	2–2		1–1		0–2				1–1	1–3	2–4		1–3	3–2
Beaconsfield Town		1–3	—	3–0	0–5		2–0			0–1				2–1	2–2				0–5		1–3	
Biggleswade		3–0		—						5–1				4–2	2–3	1–5	2–2			0–2		0–3
Biggleswade Town	3–1		3–0		—				2–3	3–0	1–0	3–2	2–3							2–2	1–1	1–3
Didcot Town		1–0	5–0	0–2		—	6–0	1–0		2–1				4–1								1–3
Flackwell Heath		2–2	2–2		2–3		—	1–0	1–2	2–0								4–0		1–1	2–3	
Hadley	1–3	2–1	0–1	0–0				—			1–1		1–3		1–2	1–2					1–3	1–2
Haringey Borough			2–1			2–1	3–2		—		3–1	2–1	1–2	1–3		2–0	0–1					
Hertford Town	4–2	1–1		3–1				0–4		—	1–1	3–2	1–3	0–3						2–2		
Leverstock Green			1–2	2–1		1–2					—	1–2		1–1	0–0	1–4	1–0		1–2	5–0		
London Lions	2–1	3–0	1–3	1–2	1–0	3–6	2–2					—			2–1				0–1	2–0		
Marlow			3–2	0–3				3–0	3–0		1–1	1–2	—	3–2		3–3		1–3				
Milton Keynes Irish	3–4				0–0	2–4	3–1	1–0						—	2–4			0–4		0–0	2–1	1–0
Potters Bar Town	2–1	4–0			3–1		3–0	2–0	1–1	2–2					—		1–2	2–3				0–2
Royston Town				1–2	1–0	2–1	3–1			1–0				5–0	1–1	—	1–1			2–2		
Stotfold			1–1		2–0		2–0	0–1		0–0		1–0			2–0		—		3–1			1–1
Thame United			3–0								2–3	5–0		4–0		0–3	1–0	—		3–3	2–1	
Waltham Abbey	5–2					1–1		7–4	5–1		2–1			1–0	2–4	3–3			—		2–3	
Ware	3–0					0–1		2–4	3–3		2–1	0–4	2–1				1–1			—	0–3	
Welwyn Garden City				1–2	1–1	1–4			0–1	2–1		5–3			1–3	1–1	5–0				—	1–2
Winslow United		2–1	3–0				3–1					6–0	3–3			3–1	4–4	3–2				—

Updated to match(es) played on 22 November 2026. Source: Southern League
Legend: Blue = home team win; Yellow = draw; Red = away team win.

=== Stadia and locations ===
Locations of Division One Central clubs
Locations of Division One Central clubs (Hertfordshire and surroundings)

Club	Location	Stadium	Capacity
Aylesbury United	Chesham	The Meadow (groundshare with Chesham United)	5,000
Barton Rovers	Barton-le-Clay	Sharpenhoe Road	4,000
Beaconsfield Town	Beaconsfield	Holloways Park	3,500
Biggleswade	Biggleswade	The Eyrie (groundshare with Bedford Town)	3,000
Biggleswade Town	Biggleswade	Langford Road	3,000
Didcot Town	Didcot	Loop Meadow	3,000
Flackwell Heath	Flackwell Heath	Wilks Park	2,000
Hadley	London (Arkley)	Brickfield Lane	2,000
Haringey Borough	London (Tottenham)	Coles Park	2,500
Hertford Town	Hertford	Hertingfordbury Park	6,500
Leverstock Green	Leverstock Green	Pancake Lane	1,500
London Lions	Chipping Barnet	Rowley Lane	1,500
Marlow	Marlow	Alfred Davis Memorial Ground	3,000
Milton Keynes Irish	Milton Keynes (Fenny Stratford)	Manor Fields	1,500
Potters Bar Town	Potters Bar	Parkfield	2,000
Royston Town	Royston	Garden Walk	5,000
Stotfold	Stotfold	The JSJ Stadium	1,500
Thame United	Thame	Meadow View Park	2,500
Waltham Abbey	Waltham Abbey	Capershotts	550
Ware	Ware	Wodson Park	3,300
Welwyn Garden City	Welwyn Garden City	Herns Way	3,000
Winslow United	Winslow	Elmfields Gate	2,000

== Division One South ==
Southern Football League Division One South
- Season: 2026–27

Division One South comprises 22 teams, 13 of which competed in the previous season.

=== Team changes ===
To Division One South

Promoted from the Hellenic League Premier Division

- Slimbridge
- Worcester Raiders

Promoted from the Wessex League Premier Division

- Portland United

Promoted from the Western League Premier Division

- Barnstaple Town
- Paulton Rovers

Relegated from the Premier Division South

- Dorchester Town
- Hungerford Town
- Tiverton Town
- Weymouth

From Division One South

Promoted to the Premier Division South

- Frome Town
- Malvern Town

Transferred to Division One Central

- Didcot Town

Transferred to the Isthmian League South Central Division

- Winchester City

Relegated to the Western League Premier Division

- Brixham
- Portishead Town
- Tavistock

Relegated to the Wessex League Premier Division

- Bashley

Resigned to the South West Peninsula League Premier Division West

- Mousehole

=== Division One South table ===
Pos	Team	Pld	W	D	L	GF	GA	GD	Pts	Promotion, qualification or relegation
1	Weymouth	17	14	2	1	45	12	+33	44	Promotion to Premier Division South
2	Westbury United	20	13	2	5	39	22	+17	41	Qualification for the play-off semi-finals (Note: Six teams play for one spot and promotion to Step 3)
3	Dorchester Town	18	13	1	4	41	22	+19	40	Qualification for the play-off semi-finals
4	Swindon Supermarine	19	12	2	5	35	23	+12	38	Qualification for the play-off quarter-finals
5	Hungerford Town	19	11	4	4	34	14	+20	37	Qualification for the play-off quarter-finals
6	Hartpury	19	10	3	6	37	22	+15	33	Qualification for the play-off quarter-finals
7	Tiverton Town	18	8	4	6	32	25	+7	28	Qualification for the play-off quarter-finals
8	Sporting Club Inkberrow	17	8	4	5	32	26	+6	28	
9	Willand Rovers	17	8	3	6	25	24	+1	27	
10	Bishop's Cleeve	17	8	2	7	28	26	+2	26	
11	Falmouth Town	19	7	5	7	28	31	−3	26	
12	Portland United	18	7	5	6	27	31	−4	26	
13	Worcester Raiders	21	5	9	7	19	27	−8	24	
14	Barnstaple Town	20	7	2	11	31	30	+1	23	
15	Exmouth Town	17	6	3	8	25	30	−5	21	
16	Melksham Town	18	5	3	10	22	35	−13	18	
17	Bideford	18	3	8	7	23	31	−8	17	
18	Shaftesbury	19	5	2	12	28	45	−17	17	
19	Paulton Rovers	17	3	6	8	16	23	−7	15	Relegation to Step 5
20	Larkhall Athletic	20	3	5	12	21	38	−17	14	Relegation to Step 5
21	Slimbridge	18	4	2	12	23	47	−24	14	Relegation to Step 5
22	Bristol Manor Farm	20	1	7	12	12	39	−27	10	Relegation to Step 5

Updated to match(es) played on 21 November 2026. Source: Southern League website, Non League Matters
Rules for classification: 1) points; 2) goal difference; 3) number of goals scored; 4) number of matches won; 5) head-to-head results

=== Results table ===
Home \ Away	BAR	BID	BIS	BMF	DOR	EXM	FAL	HAR	HUN	LAR	MEL	PAU	POR	SHA	SLI	SCI	SSM	TIV	WES	WEY	WIL	WOR
Barnstaple Town	—		0–4	2–1		1–2			1–2			1–2			3–1		1–2		1–2	0–3		4–0
Bideford		—		3–0	1–3	1–1	1–2	2–1		0–0		0–0	1–2				0–2			1–1	1–1	
Bishop's Cleeve		2–3	—	4–1	0–4	2–1		1–0			3–0					2–1	0–1					1–2
Bristol Manor Farm	0–0			—			2–2		0–2		0–0		0–0	0–2			1–2		1–4	1–4	0–2	
Dorchester Town					—	4–1		2–1	1–0	3–0	3–0	2–0	2–3		0–2			2–1				
Exmouth Town	1–3			5–0		—		1–1				2–0		1–0	2–0					2–5		
Falmouth Town	3–1	4–3	1–1		1–4		—			2–1			2–2		0–1			2–1			0–1	1–1
Hartpury	2–1		5–1				3–0	—			3–1			4–0			4–1				3–2	1–1
Hungerford Town			3–0			5–1	2–0	4–1	—	1–1				3–1		2–1		1–1		0–0		2–0
Larkhall Athletic			0–0	1–1				0–3	1–2	—				1–2	1–3		1–2	1–3	3–0	2–3		
Melksham Town	1–4	0–0					2–1		1–0	0–2	—		6–0					0–3		0–2		1–2
Paulton Rovers				1–0			1–3	0–0				—	3–3			1–3		0–1	0–2		0–1	0–0
Portland United	0–4					3–2	1–2	2–0		4–1		0–0	—	2–0		0–4			1–2			
Shaftesbury	1–1	7–2	1–2									0–5		—	5–4			1–4	1–4	1–3	1–1	3–0
Slimbridge				1–2					0–3	0–1	2–4		1–0		—		2–7			0–5	3–3	1–1
Sporting Club Inkberrow		3–2	0–4	1–1	1–3			0–2	2–2	2–2	1–1			3–1	2–0	—	3–1					
Swindon Supermarine				3–1	0–1		1–1				6–0	3–1	0–0	1–0			—		0–4			1–0
Tiverton Town	1–0		3–1		2–2	1–2		3–1				2–2	1–4			1–2		—				2–2
Westbury United		2–2			2–1	2–1		0–2	1–0						4–2	1–3	3–0	1–0	—		4–0	
Weymouth					5–1	2–0	2–1							4–1				1–2	1–0	—	3–0	
Willand Rovers	0–2				2–3				1–0	4–1	2–0						0–2		3–1		—	2–0
Worcester Raiders	2–1	0–0		0–0		0–0				3–1	1–5				4–0				0–0	0–1		—

Updated to match(es) played on 21 November 2026. Source: Southern League
Legend: Blue = home team win; Yellow = draw; Red = away team win.

=== Stadia and locations ===
Locations of Division One South clubs

Club	Location	Stadium	Capacity
Barnstaple Town	Barnstaple	Mill Road	5,000
Bideford	Bideford	The Sports Ground	6,000
Bishop's Cleeve	Bishop's Cleeve	Kayte Lane	1,500
Bristol Manor Farm	Bristol (Sea Mills)	The Creek	1,700
Dorchester Town	Dorchester	The Avenue Stadium	5,229
Exmouth Town	Exmouth	Southern Road	1,500
Falmouth Town	Falmouth	Bickland Park	3,572
Hartpury	Hartpury	Hartpury University Stadium	2,000
Hungerford Town	Hungerford	Bulpit Lane	2,500
Larkhall Athletic	Bath (Larkhall)	The Plain Ham Ground	1,429
Melksham Town	Melksham	Oakfield Stadium	2,500
Paulton Rovers	Paulton	Winterfield Stadium	2,500
Portland United	Portland	Camp and Satherley Stadium	2,000
Shaftesbury	Shaftesbury	Cockrams	2,500
Slimbridge	Slimbridge	Thornhill Park	1,500
Sporting Club Inkberrow	Inkberrow	Recreation Ground	500
Swindon Supermarine	South Marston	Hunts Copse Ground	2,000
Tiverton Town	Tiverton	Ladysmead	3,500
Westbury United	Westbury	Meadow Lane	2,500
Weymouth	Weymouth	Bob Lucas Stadium	6,600
Willand Rovers	Willand	The Stan Robinson Stadium	1,000
Worcester Raiders	Worcester	Claines Lane	1,000
