= 2025–26 Southern Football League =

The 2025–26 Southern Football League season is the 123rd in the history of the Southern League since its establishment in 1894. The league has two Premier divisions (Central and South) at Step 3 of the National League System (NLS) and two Division One divisions (Central and South) at Step 4. These correspond to levels 7 and 8 of the English football league system.

The allocations for Steps 3 and 4 this season were announced by The Football Association (FA) on 15 May 2025. There will be 88 teams in the Southern League, 22 in each of the four divisions.

== Premier Division Central ==
Southern Football League Premier Division Central
- Season: 2025–26
- Champions: Harborough Town
- Promoted: Harborough Town Spalding United
- Relegated: St Ives Town; Barwell; Royston Town; AFC Sudbury
- Matches: 462
- Goals: 1,375 (2.98 per match)

Premier Division Central comprises 22 teams, 17 of which competed in the previous season.

=== Team changes ===
To the Premier Division Central

Promoted from Division One Central

- Real Bedford

Promoted from the Isthmian League North Division

- Bury Town

Promoted from the Northern Premier League Division One Midlands

- Quorn
- Worcester City

Relegated from the National League North

- Needham Market

From the Premier Division Central

Promoted to the National League North

- AFC Telford United
- Bedford Town

Relegated to Division One Central

- Biggleswade Town
- Hitchin Town

Relegated to the Isthmian League North Division

- Lowestoft Town

=== Premier Division Central table ===
Pos	Team	Pld	W	D	L	GF	GA	GD	Pts	Promotion, qualification or relegation
1	Harborough Town (C, P)	42	28	11	3	81	33	+48	95	Promotion to the National League North
2	Spalding United (O, P)	42	25	10	7	103	54	+49	85	Qualification for the play-offs (Note: Four teams played for one spot and promotion to the National League.)
3	Real Bedford	42	24	9	9	84	47	+37	81	Qualification for the play-offs
4	Kettering Town	42	21	9	12	74	52	+22	72	Qualification for the play-offs
5	Halesowen Town	42	20	10	12	85	60	+25	70	Qualification for the play-offs
6	Needham Market	42	20	10	12	64	53	+11	70	
7	Redditch United	42	21	7	14	67	58	+9	70	
8	Quorn	42	19	8	15	78	71	+7	65	Transferred to the Northern Premier League Premier Division
9	Worcester City	42	17	12	13	64	44	+20	63	
10	Leiston	42	16	15	11	65	58	+7	63	
11	Stratford Town	42	17	10	15	61	54	+7	61	
12	Banbury United	42	17	9	16	51	56	−5	60	
13	Bury Town	42	15	13	14	61	53	+8	58	
14	Alvechurch	42	14	8	20	49	55	−6	50	
15	Stourbridge	42	12	14	16	58	68	−10	50	
16	Bishop's Stortford	42	13	10	19	53	67	−14	49	
17	Stamford	42	13	8	21	41	64	−23	47	
18	Bromsgrove Sporting	42	12	8	22	52	73	−21	44	
19	St Ives Town (R)	42	9	12	21	50	73	−23	39	Relegation to the Northern Premier League Division One Midlands
20	Barwell (R)	42	9	8	25	52	85	−33	35	Relegation to the Northern Premier League Division One Midlands
21	Royston Town (R)	42	5	10	27	35	82	−47	25	Relegation to Division One Central
22	AFC Sudbury (R)	42	6	7	29	47	115	−68	25	Relegation to the Isthmian League North Division

Source: Southern League, Non League Matters
Rules for classification: 1) points; 2) goal difference; 3) number of goals scored; 4) number of matches won; 5) head-to-head results
(C) Champions; (O) Play-off winners; (P) Promoted; (R) Relegated

=== Play-offs ===
Semi-finals
2	Spalding United	1
5	Halesowen Town	0
3	Real Bedford	3
4	Kettering Town	1

Final
2	Spalding United	4
3	Real Bedford	2

==== Semifinals ====
29 April 2026	Spalding United	1–0	Halesowen Town	Spalding
19:45 GMT	Ceesay 75'	Report		Stadium: Sir Halley Stewart Field; Attendance: 2,038

29 April 2026	Real Bedford	3–1	Kettering Town	Bedford
19:45 GMT	Setchell 1'; Tee 49'; Cartwright 75'	Report	Panter 68'	Stadium: McMullen Park; Attendance: 1,295

==== Final ====
4 May 2026	Spalding United	4–2 (a.e.t.)	Real Bedford	Spalding
15:00 GMT	Ceesay 37'; Roberts 90+2'; Cybulski 92'; Fowkes 118'	Report	Stevens 55'; Setchell 83'	Stadium: Sir Halley Stewart Field; Attendance: 2,700; Referee: Matthew Langdon

=== Results table ===
Home \ Away	SUD	ALV	BAN	BAR	BIS	BRO	BRY	HAL	HAR	KET	LEI	NHM	QRN	RBE	RED	ROY	SPA	SIT	STA	STO	STR	WOR
AFC Sudbury	—	1–2	2–1	1–3	0–2	2–2	0–3	5–5	1–3	1–4	0–3	1–3	0–4	1–3	2–0	1–1	0–1	2–1	1–3	0–4	1–1	0–6
Alvechurch	2–0	—	0–2	2–1	1–1	1–2	1–3	1–0	0–2	2–0	1–1	1–1	3–4	3–4	0–1	1–0	0–2	1–1	2–0	1–2	1–2	2–0
Banbury United	2–0	2–1	—	1–0	1–1	3–0	1–0	0–3	1–0	0–2	1–1	0–0	3–2	1–4	0–0	1–2	4–1	2–1	2–0	3–2	0–0	1–1
Barwell	2–4	1–2	1–0	—	3–1	0–2	0–3	2–6	1–1	2–5	2–3	1–1	2–2	0–2	0–1	0–1	0–2	3–2	2–1	2–0	5–2	0–2
Bishop's Stortford	6–1	2–0	1–4	3–1	—	2–1	0–0	1–0	0–3	0–2	0–1	1–2	3–4	0–5	3–2	2–0	1–4	1–0	1–0	0–1	1–1	1–2
Bromsgrove Sporting	5–3	1–4	3–0	1–0	0–2	—	2–2	0–2	1–2	3–0	2–1	0–3	1–5	1–3	1–1	2–0	2–3	0–4	2–0	1–2	1–2	0–1
Bury Town	1–0	0–1	2–1	4–0	2–0	1–1	—	2–1	1–3	0–1	1–1	1–1	4–4	0–1	1–1	1–0	1–2	1–0	0–0	1–1	1–2	1–1
Halesowen Town	5–0	2–0	3–0	3–1	4–4	3–1	3–1	—	1–3	1–1	1–2	2–0	4–1	3–2	2–3	2–1	2–2	1–0	3–1	0–3	1–0	0–3
Harborough Town	2–2	1–0	5–1	3–0	1–1	1–0	2–2	1–1	—	4–2	3–2	4–0	1–0	1–1	2–0	2–1	1–1	2–0	2–0	3–0	0–0	1–0
Kettering Town	6–0	0–2	0–0	2–1	3–1	1–0	3–3	0–0	0–1	—	3–0	0–1	3–1	2–1	1–1	3–0	2–4	0–0	1–1	5–0	2–0	2–1
Leiston	3–1	3–3	1–0	2–2	0–1	1–1	1–3	2–2	2–2	4–1	—	0–1	2–3	1–0	2–0	1–1	2–2	2–2	3–0	0–0	1–1	1–0
Needham Market	4–2	1–0	0–2	2–1	0–4	1–0	4–2	3–0	1–3	1–3	1–2	—	0–3	0–0	2–1	6–1	2–0	3–1	4–1	3–0	1–0	1–0
Quorn	1–0	0–1	2–0	0–1	1–0	2–1	2–0	2–2	0–1	0–2	1–2	2–2	—	1–0	3–2	1–2	3–4	3–1	2–0	1–1	5–2	2–4
Real Bedford	4–1	3–2	3–1	2–2	4–0	2–0	2–0	2–1	2–2	0–2	0–1	2–2	1–1	—	0–2	2–0	2–1	1–3	3–0	3–1	1–0	0–0
Redditch United	1–2	1–0	2–0	5–2	0–0	3–0	3–2	3–1	0–3	4–0	4–1	2–1	5–0	1–4	—	2–2	0–7	2–0	2–0	3–1	1–0	1–4
Royston Town	3–3	0–3	2–2	1–1	2–1	1–1	0–2	1–1	0–2	3–4	1–3	1–1	1–2	1–2	1–2	—	0–3	0–2	0–3	2–3	1–0	0–2
Spalding United	5–1	3–0	1–2	3–0	2–2	0–2	2–1	3–2	3–1	2–0	4–1	3–0	1–1	3–3	3–0	4–0	—	2–3	3–0	3–1	1–3	2–2
St Ives Town	2–0	2–0	2–1	1–1	1–1	0–2	1–2	0–4	1–2	1–3	1–3	2–2	1–4	0–0	0–2	2–2	1–1	—	1–0	2–2	0–0	2–1
Stamford	3–2	0–0	4–0	0–4	1–0	2–2	0–2	1–1	0–0	2–1	2–0	1–0	1–0	1–3	1–1	2–0	0–3	2–0	—	1–1	1–2	0–3
Stourbridge	2–3	1–1	1–1	0–0	1–1	3–3	2–0	1–3	2–1	1–1	1–1	0–1	5–0	2–1	0–1	1–0	0–1	4–3	1–3	—	0–3	2–2
Stratford Town	1–0	2–1	0–3	4–1	4–1	1–2	0–2	0–2	1–2	2–0	2–1	2–2	2–2	2–3	1–0	2–0	2–2	6–1	4–2	1–1	—	1–0
Worcester City	0–0	0–0	0–1	2–1	2–0	3–0	2–2	1–2	1–2	1–1	1–1	1–0	0–1	1–3	3–1	1–0	4–4	2–2	0–1	3–2	1–0	—

Source: Southern League
Legend: Blue = home team win; Yellow = draw; Red = away team win.

=== Stadia and locations ===
Locations of the Premier Division Central clubs
Locations of the Premier Division Central clubs
Locations of the Premier Division Central clubs (Worcestershire and surroundings)

Club	Location	Stadium	Capacity
AFC Sudbury	Sudbury	King's Marsh	2,500
Alvechurch	Alvechurch	Lye Meadow	3,000
Banbury United	Banbury	Spencer Stadium	3,116
Barwell	Barwell	Kirkby Road	2,500
Bishop's Stortford	Bishop's Stortford	Woodside Park	4,525
Bromsgrove Sporting	Bromsgrove	Victoria Ground	3,500
Bury Town	Bury St Edmunds	Ram Meadow	3,500
Halesowen Town	Halesowen	The Grove	3,150
Harborough Town	Market Harborough	Bowden Park	1,000
Kettering Town	Kettering	Latimer Park (groundshare with Burton Park Wanderers)	3,029
Leiston	Leiston	Victory Road	2,250
Needham Market	Needham Market	Bloomfields	4,000
Quorn	Quorn	Farley Way Stadium	1,477
Real Bedford	Bedford	McMullen Park	1,500
Redditch United	Redditch	The Valley	5,000
Royston Town	Royston	Garden Walk	5,000
Spalding United	Spalding	Sir Halley Stewart Field	2,700
St Ives Town	St Ives	Westwood Road	2,000
Stamford	Stamford	Borderville Sports Centre	2,000
Stourbridge	Stourbridge	War Memorial Athletic Ground	2,035
Stratford Town	Stratford-upon-Avon	Knights Lane	2,000
Worcester City	Worcester	Sixways Stadium	12,067

== Premier Division South ==
Southern Football League Premier Division South
- Season: 2025–26
- Champions: Walton & Hersham
- Promoted: Walton & Hersham; Farnham Town
- Relegated: Tiverton Town; Hungerford Town; Dorchester Town; Weymouth
- Matches: 462
- Goals: 1,458 (3.16 per match)

Premier Division South comprises 22 teams, 16 of which competed in the previous season.

=== Team changes ===
To the Premier Division South

Promoted from Division One Central

- Berkhamsted

Promoted from Division One South

- Evesham United
- Yate Town

Promoted from the Isthmian League South Central Division

- Farnham Town
- Uxbridge

Relegated from the National League South

- Weymouth

From the Premier Division South

Promoted to the National League North

- Merthyr Town

Promoted to the National League South

- AFC Totton

Relegated to Division One Central

- Marlow

Relegated to Division One South

- Frome Town
- Swindon Supermarine
- Winchester City

=== Premier Division South table ===
Pos	Team	Pld	W	D	L	GF	GA	GD	Pts	Promotion, qualification or relegation
1	Walton & Hersham (C, P)	42	29	5	8	94	42	+52	92	Promotion to the National League South
2	Farnham Town (O, P)	42	25	9	8	90	50	+40	84	Qualification for the play-offs (Note: Four teams play for one spot and promotion to the National League.)
3	Gloucester City	42	25	7	10	93	51	+42	82	Qualification for the play-offs
4	Poole Town	42	21	12	9	80	50	+30	75	Qualification for the play-offs
5	Berkhamsted	42	21	9	12	62	50	+12	72	Qualification for the play-offs
6	Sholing	42	18	15	9	74	53	+21	69	
7	Chertsey Town	42	19	10	13	64	55	+9	67	
8	Gosport Borough	42	19	6	17	74	75	−1	63	
9	Uxbridge	42	15	14	13	74	70	+4	59	
10	Havant & Waterlooville	42	17	7	18	78	70	+8	58	
11	Plymouth Parkway	42	16	8	18	64	79	−15	56	
12	Bracknell Town	42	15	10	17	70	71	−1	55	
13	Yate Town	42	14	10	18	57	62	−5	52	
14	Hanwell Town	42	14	10	18	57	63	−6	52	
15	Wimborne Town	42	12	15	15	63	62	+1	51	
16	Taunton Town	42	14	9	19	65	70	−5	51	
17	Basingstoke Town	42	14	9	19	61	71	−10	51	
18	Evesham United	42	11	14	17	51	62	−11	47	
19	Weymouth (R)	42	13	8	21	53	71	−18	47	Relegation to Division One South
20	Dorchester Town (R)	42	9	13	20	48	79	−31	40	Relegation to Division One South
21	Hungerford Town (R)	42	9	11	22	47	87	−40	38	Relegation to Division One South
22	Tiverton Town (R)	42	5	3	34	39	115	−76	18	Relegation to Division One South

Source: Southern League, Non League Matters
Rules for classification: 1) points; 2) goal difference; 3) number of goals scored; 4) number of matches won; 5) head-to-head results
(C) Champions; (O) Play-off winners; (P) Promoted; (R) Relegated

=== Play-offs ===
Semi-finals
2	Farnham Town	2
5	Berkhamsted	1
3	Gloucester City	3
4	Poole Town	2

Final
2	Farnham Town	5
3	Gloucester City	1

==== Semifinals ====
29 April 2026	Farnham Town	2–1	Berkhamsted	Farnham
19:45 GMT	Dean 48'; Sanders 83' (pen.)	Report	Lacey 67' (pen.)	Stadium: Memorial Ground; Attendance: 1,715

29 April 2026	Gloucester City	3–2 (a.e.t.)	Poole Town	Hempsted
19:45 GMT	Siddall 33'; Hanks 86'; O'regan 111'	Report	Slade 28'; Gwengwe 56'	Stadium: Meadow Park; Attendance: 2,400

==== Final ====
4 May 2026	Farnham Town	5–1	Gloucester City	Farnham
15:00 GMT	Sanders 49' (pen.); Clifford 62', 86', 90+8'; Taylor 68'	Report	Simpson 70'	Stadium: Memorial Ground; Attendance: 2,200; Referee: Robert Ablitt

=== Results table ===
Home \ Away	BAS	BER	BRA	CHE	DOR	EVE	FAR	GLO	GOS	HAN	H&W	HUN	PLY	POO	SHO	TAU	TIV	UXB	W&H	WEY	WIM	YAT
Basingstoke Town	—	2–1	2–1	2–1	1–1	1–0	1–4	0–2	0–3	3–2	1–3	1–2	1–1	1–2	1–0	3–3	3–1	1–1	0–3	1–2	2–0	4–2
Berkhamsted	1–0	—	1–0	1–2	1–0	3–1	3–3	1–0	2–1	2–3	2–1	4–1	2–2	1–2	1–1	3–2	3–0	3–0	0–3	2–0	0–3	1–1
Bracknell Town	3–2	1–1	—	2–4	2–2	2–3	2–0	0–2	0–2	2–1	3–0	1–1	0–2	3–4	4–2	3–2	8–0	1–1	2–3	1–2	3–2	3–0
Chertsey Town	4–2	0–1	1–1	—	2–1	4–0	0–1	2–2	1–3	2–1	2–0	1–0	1–0	0–1	1–1	3–1	4–3	3–3	0–1	4–0	3–0	2–2
Dorchester Town	1–0	2–3	2–4	0–0	—	1–0	1–3	0–5	2–2	1–4	4–3	2–1	2–2	1–1	0–4	1–4	1–3	0–2	3–3	1–2	0–2	2–0
Evesham United	1–1	0–2	1–1	1–1	4–1	—	1–2	1–1	1–3	1–0	0–1	2–1	1–1	1–1	0–0	3–0	5–0	1–2	3–1	1–0	2–1	0–1
Farnham Town	1–1	1–0	1–3	1–0	2–1	1–1	—	3–3	2–0	3–1	2–1	1–0	4–0	2–1	2–2	4–0	5–0	4–1	1–2	2–3	1–1	3–1
Gloucester City	2–1	3–3	1–0	2–0	2–0	2–2	1–2	—	4–2	3–0	3–2	6–1	3–0	3–2	2–1	0–2	3–1	2–3	1–0	3–1	5–0	1–0
Gosport Borough	3–4	3–1	6–1	2–2	2–2	1–0	3–3	0–2	—	2–1	0–4	3–2	3–6	1–0	1–2	3–1	3–2	1–2	0–2	4–3	1–0	0–2
Hanwell Town	2–1	1–1	3–0	1–2	0–2	2–0	1–1	1–2	2–1	—	1–1	1–3	3–2	1–1	0–0	0–4	2–0	1–1	1–0	4–0	1–1	3–0
Havant & Waterlooville	0–0	0–1	0–1	1–1	3–1	6–1	4–3	3–0	4–0	2–3	—	1–2	1–0	0–3	4–3	2–3	3–2	3–3	1–3	2–0	4–0	1–3
Hungerford Town	1–3	0–3	1–2	0–1	0–0	3–3	2–7	1–2	2–0	1–5	0–2	—	1–1	0–0	1–1	2–1	2–1	0–4	1–0	0–0	0–0	3–1
Plymouth Parkway	3–0	2–0	1–0	3–1	3–3	1–0	2–1	2–1	1–2	2–0	3–3	1–2	—	0–1	1–1	2–1	1–2	0–3	0–4	0–2	3–2	1–0
Poole Town	1–0	3–1	0–0	1–0	2–0	1–1	2–2	1–2	0–1	1–0	2–0	3–1	7–0	—	0–1	2–1	5–5	3–1	2–2	6–0	1–2	2–2
Sholing	1–4	1–1	0–1	4–0	2–1	3–0	1–2	1–1	2–2	1–1	3–3	5–3	4–2	4–1	—	4–2	2–1	3–0	1–3	3–2	2–2	2–0
Taunton Town	1–1	1–2	2–0	0–2	1–1	0–0	1–0	2–1	2–3	2–2	2–2	2–2	2–0	1–4	0–1	—	3–0	2–1	3–0	1–1	2–1	2–1
Tiverton Town	0–4	0–1	2–0	0–2	0–1	1–2	0–3	0–6	2–3	0–2	0–2	2–0	2–3	1–2	0–1	2–1	—	1–1	0–1	0–4	0–6	2–3
Uxbridge	2–1	2–1	2–3	0–1	0–0	2–2	1–3	4–3	2–1	2–0	3–0	3–1	1–2	3–3	0–2	2–2	2–1	—	2–3	5–1	3–3	1–3
Walton & Hersham	6–2	2–0	1–1	1–2	3–1	2–1	1–0	2–0	2–0	5–0	2–1	0–0	6–3	1–2	2–0	2–1	6–0	1–1	—	4–0	1–0	3–1
Weymouth	1–2	0–1	1–1	5–1	0–0	1–3	1–2	0–3	0–2	0–0	0–1	4–0	1–2	2–0	0–1	2–0	4–1	0–0	3–1	—	1–1	2–2
Wimborne Town	1–1	0–1	3–3	4–1	1–2	1–1	0–1	2–2	1–0	3–0	3–1	1–1	3–2	0–2	1–1	1–0	0–0	2–2	1–4	3–0	—	4–1
Yate Town	1–0	0–0	4–1	0–0	0–1	3–0	0–1	2–1	1–1	2–0	1–2	6–2	2–1	2–2	0–0	1–2	2–1	2–0	1–2	0–2	1–1	—

Source: Southern League
Legend: Blue = home team win; Yellow = draw; Red = away team win.

=== Stadia and locations ===
Locations of the Premier Division South clubs
Greater London and environ Premier Division South clubs

Club	Location	Stadium	Capacity
Basingstoke Town	Basingstoke	Winklebury Football Complex (Basingstoke)	2,000
Berkhamsted	Berkhamsted	Broadwater	1,950
Bracknell Town	Sandhurst	SB Stadium	1,950
Chertsey Town	Chertsey	Alwyns Lane	2,500
Dorchester Town	Dorchester	The Avenue Stadium	5,229
Evesham United	Evesham	Jubilee Stadium	3,000
Farnham Town	Farnham	The Memorial Ground	1,500
Gloucester City	Gloucester	Meadow Park	4,000
Gosport Borough	Gosport	Privett Park	4,500
Hanwell Town	Perivale	Powerday Stadium	3,000
Havant & Waterlooville	Havant	Westleigh Park	5,300
Hungerford Town	Hungerford	Bulpit Lane	2,500
Plymouth Parkway	Plymouth	Bolitho Park	3,500
Poole Town	Poole	The BlackGold Stadium	2,500
Sholing	Sholing	Universal Stadium	2,500
Taunton Town	Taunton	Wordsworth Drive	3,000
Tiverton Town	Tiverton	Ladysmead	3,500
Uxbridge	West Drayton	Honeycroft	3,770
Walton & Hersham	Walton-on-Thames	Elmbridge Sports Hub	2,097
Weymouth	Weymouth	Bob Lucas Stadium	6,600
Wimborne Town	Wimborne Minster	The Cuthbury	3,250
Yate Town	Yate	Lodge Road	2,000

== Division One Central ==
Southern Football League Division One Central
- Season: 2025–26
- Champions: Leighton Town
- Promoted: Leighton Town; Hitchin Town
- Relegated: Enfield; Northwood; Rayners Lane; AFC Dunstable
- Matches: 462
- Goals: 1,689 (3.66 per match)

Division One Central comprises 22 teams, 16 of which competed in the previous season.

=== Team changes ===
To Division One Central

Promoted from the Spartan South Midlands League Premier Division

- London Lions
- Milton Keynes Irish

Relegated from the Premier Division Central

- Biggleswade Town
- Hitchin Town

Relegated from the Premier Division South

- Marlow

Transferred from the Isthmian League South Central Division

- Rayners Lane

From Division One Central

Promoted to the Premier Division Central

- Real Bedford

Promoted to the Premier Division South

- Berkhamsted

Relegated to the Combined Counties League Premier Division North

- Kidlington
- North Leigh

Relegated to the Spartan South Midlands League Premier Division

- Kings Langley

=== Division One Central table ===
Pos	Team	Pld	W	D	L	GF	GA	GD	Pts	Promotion, qualification or relegation
1	Leighton Town (C, P)	42	31	7	4	109	39	+70	100	Promotion to the Premier Division Central
2	Hitchin Town (O, P)	42	28	8	6	101	37	+64	92	Qualification for the play-offs (Note: Four teams play for one spot and possible promotion to Step 3.)
3	Biggleswade	42	27	8	7	102	49	+53	89	Qualification for the play-offs
4	Biggleswade Town	42	24	9	9	104	58	+46	81	Qualification for the play-offs
5	Thame United	42	25	5	12	104	65	+39	80	Qualification for the play-offs
6	Hertford Town	42	24	5	13	110	60	+50	77	
7	Ware	42	21	6	15	84	59	+25	69	
8	Welwyn Garden City	42	18	15	9	73	55	+18	69	
9	Barton Rovers	42	20	9	13	84	71	+13	69	
10	Hadley	42	18	9	15	79	69	+10	63	
11	Beaconsfield Town	42	17	10	15	77	77	0	61	
12	Leverstock Green	42	15	13	14	74	66	+8	58	
13	Milton Keynes Irish	42	18	4	20	73	87	−14	58	
14	Marlow	42	17	2	23	72	90	−18	53	
15	Flackwell Heath	42	14	8	20	69	66	+3	50	
16	Aylesbury United	42	14	6	22	72	77	−5	48	
17	Stotfold	42	15	3	24	66	77	−11	48	
18	London Lions	42	13	5	24	62	98	−36	44	
19	Enfield (R)	42	10	5	27	54	106	−52	35	Relegation to the Spartan South Midlands League Premier Division
20	Northwood (R)	42	5	13	24	50	101	−51	28	Relegation to the Combined Counties League Premier Division North
21	Rayners Lane (R)	42	5	5	32	42	123	−81	20	Relegation to the Combined Counties League Premier Division North
22	AFC Dunstable (R)	42	3	5	34	28	159	−131	14	Merged with Dunstable Town in the Spartan South Midlands League Premier Division

Source: Southern League, Non League Matters
Rules for classification: 1) points; 2) goal difference; 3) number of goals scored; 4) number of matches won; 5) head-to-head results
(C) Champions; (O) Play-off winners; (P) Promoted; (R) Relegated

=== Play-offs ===
Semi-finals
2	Hitchin Town	1
5	Thame United	0
3	Biggleswade	2
4	Biggleswade Town	1

Final
2	Hitchin Town	2
3	Biggleswade	1

==== Semifinals ====
29 April 2026	Hitchin Town	1–0 (a.e.t.)	Thame United	Hitchin
19:45 GMT	Kane 111'	Report		Stadium: Top Field; Attendance: 1,285

29 April 2026	Biggleswade	2–1 (a.e.t.)	Biggleswade Town	Biggleswade
19:45 GMT	Simpson 77'; Coles 117'	Report	Silver 18'	Stadium: The Eyrie; Attendance: 490

==== Final ====
4 May 2026	Hitchin Town	2–1	Biggleswade	Hitchin
15:00 GMT	Bell-Toxtle 19'; Jones 57'	Report	Marsh 70' (pen.)	Stadium: Top Field; Attendance: 3,027; Referee: Patrick Nixon

=== Results table ===
Home \ Away	DUN	AYU	BAR	BEA	BGW	BWT	ENF	FLA	HAD	HER	HIT	LEI	LSG	LOL	MLW	MKI	NWD	RLA	STO	THM	WAR	WGC
AFC Dunstable	—	2–0	1–3	1–1	1–5	0–3	0–3	0–2	1–1	0–6	0–8	0–6	0–9	0–2	1–3	1–2	2–2	4–3	0–0	1–6	0–2	0–4
Aylesbury United	6–0	—	2–3	1–3	2–3	0–3	4–0	0–2	1–1	1–3	0–2	0–1	0–0	0–3	2–0	2–0	2–2	3–1	3–1	3–3	1–0	2–2
Barton Rovers	8–0	1–0	—	2–0	1–2	2–2	3–2	1–0	1–4	2–2	0–2	0–3	4–1	1–0	2–0	1–3	3–1	4–0	4–0	0–4	1–0	2–2
Beaconsfield Town	2–1	2–3	1–1	—	2–2	2–3	4–0	1–1	4–1	0–4	2–2	2–2	0–2	2–1	4–1	4–1	4–4	2–1	1–2	0–4	1–0	0–1
Biggleswade	8–0	2–1	1–1	6–1	—	0–3	2–0	3–2	2–2	1–1	1–1	1–1	1–0	2–2	7–2	3–1	3–1	0–1	3–2	2–3	5–1	2–3
Biggleswade Town	8–1	5–1	4–4	2–1	0–0	—	2–1	1–0	1–1	0–5	2–2	1–2	5–3	1–0	2–0	0–0	5–0	7–0	2–3	0–1	2–1	1–1
Enfield	5–2	0–3	1–3	1–3	1–4	1–3	—	0–2	0–4	1–2	1–3	2–1	1–1	1–3	2–2	1–3	1–0	1–3	2–3	4–0	0–4	2–4
Flackwell Heath	6–0	3–0	1–2	3–1	0–2	2–4	1–1	—	2–2	1–3	1–0	1–2	1–1	4–0	2–3	1–0	2–2	2–2	3–1	1–2	0–1	1–2
Hadley	3–2	0–1	2–1	1–1	0–2	2–4	4–3	2–1	—	2–0	0–2	1–2	0–1	1–2	1–2	2–5	1–1	1–2	4–2	4–3	6–1	0–3
Hertford Town	3–1	5–1	6–2	4–3	0–3	3–3	7–0	6–0	1–3	—	2–3	2–1	3–1	7–2	2–0	3–1	1–2	3–0	0–1	2–0	1–4	3–0
Hitchin Town	1–0	3–1	1–1	5–1	0–1	0–1	6–0	2–0	3–1	1–3	—	5–0	2–1	3–0	2–0	3–0	1–1	2–2	3–2	0–5	4–1	2–1
Leighton Town	4–0	2–1	4–2	4–0	1–0	3–2	6–1	5–2	1–0	2–0	0–0	—	2–0	5–0	4–1	1–0	2–0	5–0	3–1	3–1	4–1	1–1
Leverstock Green	5–0	3–3	1–2	2–0	2–4	0–3	1–1	2–0	1–1	0–2	3–2	2–2	—	3–1	2–1	2–0	2–0	2–2	1–1	2–1	1–2	2–1
London Lions	2–1	4–1	3–0	2–2	1–4	2–7	1–1	1–1	0–3	2–0	0–2	2–5	3–2	—	0–4	1–4	1–1	5–1	1–2	1–5	0–3	3–2
Marlow	4–0	3–0	3–1	2–3	1–2	2–1	2–3	0–4	2–3	3–1	1–4	1–5	2–2	3–0	—	4–0	2–0	3–2	4–1	1–2	0–2	3–2
Milton Keynes Irish	5–0	1–4	2–0	1–2	1–3	3–1	3–0	0–3	1–2	3–2	0–6	1–1	3–2	4–3	4–1	—	1–1	4–1	1–5	0–6	3–4	2–4
Northwood	3–1	0–2	2–5	1–3	1–3	1–4	0–2	0–3	0–2	2–2	0–2	0–5	1–1	2–5	1–2	2–3	—	2–4	2–0	0–3	1–1	2–2
Rayners Lane	1–0	1–10	1–4	0–3	1–2	1–2	1–3	1–1	1–5	0–4	0–2	1–2	2–2	1–2	1–3	0–2	0–1	—	0–4	1–4	0–3	1–2
Stotfold	4–1	2–1	1–2	0–3	3–1	0–2	1–2	2–4	0–1	3–1	0–1	0–1	2–3	1–0	2–0	0–2	1–3	4–0	—	1–2	3–0	1–1
Thame United	2–2	0–2	1–1	1–4	2–1	3–0	3–1	4–3	2–0	4–2	0–4	1–4	4–0	2–1	4–0	1–2	6–3	2–1	1–0	—	1–1	0–1
Ware	8–0	2–0	3–1	1–1	0–1	3–1	0–1	3–0	2–3	0–2	2–4	1–1	0–2	3–0	4–0	3–0	4–0	3–0	5–4	2–2	—	0–0
Welwyn Garden City	0–1	3–2	2–2	0–1	0–2	1–1	2–1	1–0	2–2	1–1	0–0	2–0	1–1	1–0	3–1	1–1	2–2	3–1	3–0	4–3	2–3	—

Source: Southern League
Legend: Blue = home team win; Yellow = draw; Red = away team win.

=== Stadia and locations ===
Locations of Division One Central clubs
Locations of Division One Central clubs (Hertfordshire and surroundings)

Club	Location	Stadium	Capacity
AFC Dunstable	Dunstable	Creasey Park	3,065
Aylesbury United	Chesham	The Meadow (groundshare with Chesham United)	5,000
Barton Rovers	Barton-le-Clay	Sharpenhoe Road	4,000
Beaconsfield Town	Beaconsfield	Holloways Park	3,500
Biggleswade	Biggleswade	The Eyrie (groundshare with Bedford Town)	3,000
Biggleswade Town	Biggleswade	Langford Road	3,000
Enfield	Bishop's Stortford	Woodside Park (groundshare with Bishop's Stortford)	4,525
Flackwell Heath	Flackwell Heath	Wilks Park	2,000
Hadley	London (Arkley)	Brickfield Lane	2,000
Hertford Town	Hertford	Hertingfordbury Park	6,500
Hitchin Town	Hitchin	Top Field	3,529
Leighton Town	Leighton Buzzard	Bell Close	2,800
Leverstock Green	Leverstock Green	Pancake Lane	1,500
London Lions	Chipping Barnet	Rowley Lane	1,500
Marlow	Marlow	Alfred Davis Memorial Ground	3,000
Milton Keynes Irish	Milton Keynes (Fenny Stratford)	Manor Fields	1,500
Northwood	Northwood	Northwood Park	3,075
Rayners Lane	Rayners Lane	The Tithe Farm Social Club	1,000
Stotfold	Stotfold	The JSJ Stadium	1,500
Thame United	Thame	Meadow View Park	2,500
Ware	Ware	Wodson Park	3,300
Welwyn Garden City	Welwyn Garden City	Herns Way	3,000

== Division One South ==
Southern Football League Division One South
- Season: 2025–26
- Champions: Frome Town
- Promoted: Frome Town; Malvern Town
- Relegated: Bashley; Brixham; Tavistock; Portishead Town
- Matches: 462
- Goals: 1,484 (3.21 per match)

Division One South comprises 22 teams, 15 of which competed in the previous season.

=== Team changes ===
To Division One South

Promoted from the Hellenic League Premier Division

- Hartpury
- Sporting Club Inkberrow

Promoted from the Western League Premier Division

- Brixham
- Portishead Town

Relegated from the Premier Division South

- Frome Town
- Swindon Supermarine
- Winchester City

From Division One South

Promoted to the Premier Division South

- Evesham United
- Yate Town

Relegated to the Combined Counties League Premier Division South

- Thatcham Town

Relegated to the Hellenic League Premier Division

- Cinderford Town
- Cribbs

Relegated to the Western League Premier Division

- Helston Athletic

Resigned to the Wessex League Premier Division

- Bemerton Heath Harlequins

=== Division One South table ===
Pos	Team	Pld	W	D	L	GF	GA	GD	Pts	Promotion, qualification or relegation
1	Frome Town (C, P)	42	32	6	4	97	32	+65	102	Promotion to the Premier Division South
2	Portishead Town	42	30	5	7	110	37	+73	95	Demoted to the Western League Premier Division (Note: Portishead Town were demoted to the Western League Premier Division due to not meeting Grade 4 ground requirements by 31 March 2026. Bishop’s Cleeve replaced them in the playoffs.)
3	Malvern Town (O, P)	42	30	5	7	103	61	+42	95	Qualification for the play-offs (Note: Four teams play for one spot and promotion to Step 3.)
4	Winchester City	42	24	10	8	92	52	+40	82	Qualification for the play-offs, then transferred to the Isthmian League South Central Division
5	Shaftesbury	42	25	4	13	96	69	+27	79	Qualification for the play-offs
6	Bishop's Cleeve	42	23	9	10	77	59	+18	78	Qualification for the play-offs
7	Hartpury	42	20	7	15	83	55	+28	67	
8	Exmouth Town	42	18	7	17	70	68	+2	61	
9	Larkhall Athletic	42	18	7	17	74	74	0	61	
10	Westbury United	42	17	7	18	46	49	−3	58	
11	Sporting Club Inkberrow	42	16	7	19	62	76	−14	55	
12	Swindon Supermarine	42	13	11	18	63	61	+2	50	
13	Didcot Town	42	14	8	20	53	70	−17	50	Transferred to Division One Central
14	Falmouth Town	42	13	10	19	67	83	−16	49	
15	Bristol Manor Farm	42	12	12	18	57	77	−20	48	
16	Bideford	42	13	9	20	55	83	−28	48	
17	Mousehole	42	11	13	18	54	64	−10	45 (Note: Mousehole had one point deducted.)	Voluntary demotion to the South West Peninsula League Premier Division West
18	Melksham Town	42	11	12	19	45	63	−18	45	
19	Willand Rovers	42	11	10	21	54	74	−20	43	
20	Bashley (R)	42	10	7	25	50	72	−22	37	Relegation to the Wessex League Premier Division
21	Brixham (R)	42	10	6	26	47	92	−45	36	Relegation to the Western League Premier Division
22	Tavistock (R)	42	3	4	35	29	113	−84	13	Relegation to the Western League Premier Division

Source: Southern League website, Non League Matters
Rules for classification: 1) points; 2) goal difference; 3) number of goals scored; 4) number of matches won; 5) head-to-head results
(C) Champions; (O) Play-off winners; (P) Promoted; (R) Relegated

=== Play-offs ===
Semi-finals
3	Malvern Town	2
6	Bishop's Cleeve	1
4	Winchester City	0
5	Shaftesbury	2

Final
3	Malvern Town	3
5	Shaftesbury	2

==== Semifinals ====
29 April 2026	Malvern Town	2–1 (a.e.t.)	Bishop's Cleeve	Malvern
19:45 GMT	Tumelty 72'; Brunt 114'	Report	Lee 87'	Stadium: Langland Stadium; Attendance: 1,053

29 April 2026	Winchester City	0–2	Shaftesbury	Winchester
19:45 GMT		Report	Holmes 25', 90+10'	Stadium: The City Ground; Attendance: 518

==== Final ====
4 May 2026	Malvern Town	3–2	Shaftesbury	Malvern
15:00 GMT	Bullock 8'; H. Clark 66'; S. Clark 79'	Report	Santos 11' (pen.); Holmes 26'	Stadium: Langland Stadium; Attendance: 2,100; Referee: Benjamin Stott

=== Results table ===
Home \ Away	BAS	BID	BIS	BMF	BRX	DID	EXM	FAL	FRO	HAR	LAR	MAL	MEL	MOU	POR	SHA	SCI	SSM	TAV	WES	WIL	WIN
Bashley	—	2–3	0–1	1–2	2–0	0–2	1–1	1–3	1–3	0–2	4–2	0–2	0–1	1–1	0–2	1–3	3–2	2–2	3–1	0–0	2–0	0–2
Bideford	3–2	—	1–3	2–0	1–1	2–0	1–0	1–2	0–2	1–2	0–3	3–1	2–0	3–2	1–2	0–3	1–1	0–0	2–2	1–2	3–1	1–6
Bishop's Cleeve	2–0	1–1	—	3–1	6–1	2–0	1–0	3–3	1–2	3–1	1–0	1–3	3–1	1–2	1–1	3–2	4–1	1–1	3–0	2–0	2–1	2–1
Bristol Manor Farm	2–1	2–0	1–1	—	1–1	1–1	0–3	3–0	2–3	1–0	2–0	4–1	3–1	1–1	0–3	0–3	0–0	2–2	1–1	1–1	1–1	0–4
Brixham	1–2	4–0	1–2	2–1	—	0–2	0–2	1–1	0–4	0–1	3–2	1–4	4–1	2–3	0–3	1–5	1–4	0–2	2–0	0–2	1–1	1–1
Didcot Town	1–3	0–0	3–7	0–2	1–0	—	0–1	4–2	0–2	3–1	2–0	0–1	2–0	4–4	0–4	3–0	2–2	1–0	3–0	1–1	1–1	1–3
Exmouth Town	0–1	5–3	0–2	4–0	4–1	2–1	—	3–1	1–1	0–1	2–1	2–4	0–1	1–0	2–3	2–1	2–2	3–2	4–0	1–0	2–2	1–2
Falmouth Town	2–2	4–4	3–0	1–0	2–0	0–2	5–0	—	1–4	3–2	1–1	0–1	0–2	1–2	0–1	2–1	1–0	0–0	4–1	1–1	3–0	5–6
Frome Town	2–0	4–0	4–0	3–2	2–0	2–0	3–1	2–0	—	0–0	1–3	2–1	4–0	1–0	1–2	3–2	2–1	3–1	3–0	1–0	1–0	1–1
Hartpury	0–0	0–1	3–0	3–1	7–1	2–0	1–2	0–3	2–2	—	5–0	2–2	0–1	0–1	1–3	3–3	3–1	2–1	6–1	1–0	8–0	0–0
Larkhall Athletic	3–1	1–1	4–4	3–2	0–1	1–1	3–2	3–3	1–4	3–1	—	0–2	3–2	2–0	1–1	1–3	1–0	3–2	2–0	4–2	2–2	1–2
Malvern Town	1–0	3–1	1–2	3–5	7–3	4–2	3–1	3–1	1–6	4–1	3–2	—	2–0	3–0	3–1	2–1	1–0	4–2	5–1	2–2	5–2	4–1
Melksham Town	0–2	2–0	0–0	2–2	2–3	1–3	0–0	5–1	2–0	2–2	1–2	1–1	—	0–0	0–4	4–5	2–0	0–2	1–1	0–2	0–2	1–0
Mousehole	4–3	3–0	0–1	1–1	3–0	0–1	2–2	0–0	0–2	0–3	2–1	1–2	0–0	—	0–2	1–1	0–1	1–1	0–2	1–1	3–3	1–3
Portishead Town	2–1	4–1	5–0	6–1	2–0	6–0	5–0	7–0	0–0	1–3	4–2	4–0	2–1	1–2	—	3–0	5–1	0–0	7–0	0–1	3–1	3–2
Shaftesbury	4–3	4–0	3–0	3–1	2–0	2–1	4–4	4–0	3–3	0–2	2–0	2–4	2–1	1–4	4–2	—	3–0	3–1	2–0	1–0	3–2	2–1
Sporting Club Inkberrow	1–0	3–2	0–2	3–0	1–0	6–4	0–3	1–3	0–3	2–4	1–2	1–1	1–1	2–1	1–0	2–3	—	1–0	3–1	2–1	6–4	2–2
Swindon Supermarine	3–0	2–2	3–0	3–1	1–2	0–0	4–2	3–0	1–3	1–2	1–3	1–3	1–1	0–3	1–2	3–1	3–1	—	2–1	1–2	3–0	1–3
Tavistock	1–0	0–2	0–3	1–3	1–4	0–1	1–2	1–0	0–4	1–2	0–4	1–3	0–2	1–1	1–2	1–3	2–3	0–3	—	0–2	1–2	1–2
Westbury United	2–1	0–2	3–1	2–2	1–2	2–0	1–0	2–1	0–1	2–1	0–1	0–1	1–2	2–1	0–2	1–2	0–1	1–0	3–2	—	1–3	1–0
Willand Rovers	1–2	2–3	1–1	0–2	1–0	1–0	1–2	2–2	1–0	3–2	3–1	0–1	0–0	4–1	0–0	2–0	0–1	0–1	3–0	0–1	—	0–1
Winchester City	2–2	2–0	1–1	3–0	2–2	2–0	3–1	4–2	1–3	2–1	0–2	1–1	1–1	3–2	4–0	2–0	3–1	2–2	6–1	3–0	2–1	—

Source: Southern League
Legend: Blue = home team win; Yellow = draw; Red = away team win.

=== Stadia and locations ===
Locations of Division One South clubs

Club	Location	Stadium	Capacity
Bashley	Bashley	Bashley Road	4,250
Bideford	Bideford	The Sports Ground	6,000
Bishop's Cleeve	Bishop's Cleeve	Kayte Lane	1,500
Bristol Manor Farm	Bristol (Sea Mills)	The Creek	1,700
Brixham	Brixham	Wall Park Road	2,000
Didcot Town	Didcot	Loop Meadow	3,000
Exmouth Town	Exmouth	Southern Road	1,500
Falmouth Town	Falmouth	Bickland Park	3,572
Frome Town	Frome	Badgers Hill	3,000
Hartpury	Hartpury	Hartpury University Stadium	2,000
Larkhall Athletic	Bath (Larkhall)	The Plain Ham Ground	1,429
Malvern Town	Malvern	Langland Stadium	2,500
Melksham Town	Melksham	Oakfield Stadium	2,500
Mousehole	Mousehole	Trungle Parc	2,000
Portishead Town	Portishead	Bristol Road	1,400
Shaftesbury	Shaftesbury	Cockrams	2,500
Sporting Club Inkberrow	Inkberrow	Recreation Ground	500
Swindon Supermarine	South Marston	Hunts Copse Ground	2,000
Tavistock	Tavistock	Langsford Park	2,000
Westbury United	Westbury	Meadow Lane	2,500
Willand Rovers	Willand	The Stan Robinson Stadium	1,000
Winchester City	Winchester	The City Ground	4,500
