= 2025–26 FA Trophy =

2025–26 football tournament

FA Trophy
Football Association Trophy

Tournament details
- Country: England; Wales
- Dates: Qualifying rounds: 23 August 2025 – 4 October 2025; Competition Proper: 25 October 2025 – 17 May 2026
- Teams: 336

Final positions
- Champions: Southend United (1st title)
- Runners-up: Wealdstone

The 2025–26 FA Trophy (known for sponsorship reasons as the 2025–26 Isuzu FA Trophy) is the 57th edition of the FA Trophy, an annual football competition for teams at levels 5–8 of the English football league system.

Aldershot Town were the defending champions, having won the 2024–25 edition.

== Format and eligibility ==
The calendar and entries were announced by The Football Association on 26 June 2025.

Aldershot Town are the reigning champions for the 2024–25 season, having defeated Spennymoor Town 3–0 in the 2025 FA Trophy final at Wembley Stadium.

Round	Main Date	Number of Fixtures	Clubs Remaining	New Entries This Round	Losing Club	Winning Club
Preliminary round	23 August 2025	16	336 → 320	32	£400	£1,500
First round qualifying	6 September 2025	80	320 → 240	144	£400	£1,500
Second round qualifying	20 September 2025	40	240 → 200	none	£575	£2,250
Third round qualifying	4 October 2025	64	200 → 136	88	£625	£2,450
First round proper	25 October 2025	32	136 → 104	none	£775	£3,000
Second round proper	15 November 2025	40	104 → 64	48	£1,000	£3,750
Third round proper	13 December 2025	32	64 → 32	24	£1,250	£4,500
Fourth round proper	10 January 2026	16	32 → 16	none	£1,500	£5,250
Fifth round proper	31 January 2026	8	16 → 8	none	£1,750	£6,000
Quarter-finals	28 February 2026	4	8 → 4	none	£2,000	£7,500
Semi-finals	28 March 2026	2	4 → 2	none	£5,000	£15,000
Final	17 May 2026	1	2 → 1	none	£30,000	£60,000

== Preliminary round ==
The draw for the preliminary round was made on 4 July 2025.

Tie	Home team	Score	Away team	Att.
Friday 22 August 2025
14	Egham Town (8)	0–2	Margate (8)	186
Saturday 23 August 2025
1	Garforth Town (8)	3–0	Ashington (8)	236
2	Consett (8)	1–1 (5–4 p)	Bishop Auckland (8)	278
3	Sporting Khalsa (8)	1–1 (4–3 p)	Wellingborough Town (8)	145
4	Sutton Coldfield Town (8)	3–2	Rugby Borough (8)	118
5	Brightlingsea Regent (8)	3–1	Barton Rovers (8)	125
6	Heybridge Swifts (8)	1–1 (6–7 p)	Wroxham (8)	182

Tie	Home team	Score	Away team	Att.
7	Brantham Athletic (8)	0–4	Grays Athletic (8)	99
8	Leighton Town (8)	2–0	Gorleston (8)	318
9	Northwood (8)	3–1	Hanworth Villa (8)	110
10	AFC Croydon Athletic (8)	1–3	AFC Whyteleafe (8)	167
11	Sheppey United (8)	1–1 (0–3 p)	Hassocks (8)	228
12	Metropolitan Police (8)	1–1 (4–2 p)	Hartley Wintney (8)	87
13	Marlow (8)	0–3	Three Bridges (8)	142
15	Bashley (8)	0–3	Frome Town (8)	152
16	Westbury United (8)	1–1 (7–8 p)	Falmouth Town (8)	278

== First qualifying round ==
The draw for the first qualifying round was made on 4 July 2025.

Tie	Home team	Score	Away team	Att.
Friday 5 September 2025
7	Heaton Stannington (8)	2–0	Emley (8)	372
5	Bootle (8)	2–3	Witton Albion (8)	325
38	Enfield (8)	1–0	Wroxham (8)	111
53	Ascot United (8)	2–0	Three Bridges (8)	155
Saturday 6 September 2025
1	Newton Aycliffe (8)	3–0	Blyth Town (8)	220
2	Dunston (8)	4–1	Brighouse Town (8)	376
3	Stalybridge Celtic (8)	2–0	Trafford (8)	553
4	Ossett United (8)	1–3	Nantwich Town (8)	348
6	Consett (8)	4–0	Hallam (8)	186
8	North Ferriby (8)	1–0	Blyth Spartans (8)	446
9	Silsden (8)	1–0	Atherton Collieries (8)	161
10	Congleton Town (8)	3–1	Vauxhall Motors (8)	529
11	Bradford (Park Avenue) (8)	1–1 (6–5 p)	Redcar Athletic (8)	354
12	Bury (8)	3–1	Wythenshawe Town (8)	1,751
13	Runcorn Linnets (8)	1–1 (4–1 p)	Garforth Town (8)	385
15	Avro (8)	1–3	Clitheroe (8)	183
16	Bridlington Town (8)	1–0	Mossley (8)	455
17	Long Eaton United (8)	2–2 (2–3 p)	Carlton Town (8)	205
18	Belper Town (8)	2–1	Newcastle Town (8)	460
19	Coventry Sphinx (8)	0–2	Lincoln United (8)	135
20	Stafford Rangers (8)	1–0	Boldmere St. Michaels (8)	503
21	Rugby Town (8)	4–1	Racing Club Warwick (8)	328
22	Sutton Coldfield Town (8)	3–2	Kidsgrove Athletic (8)	205
23	Shifnal Town (8)	1–0	Chasetown (8)	288
24	Mickleover (8)	2–3	Basford United (8)	306
25	Sporting Club Inkberrow (8)	0–0(3–1 p)	St Neots Town (8)	146
26	Bedworth United (8)	0–0 (7–6 p)	Darlaston Town 1874 (8)	188
27	Lichfield City (8)	1–2	Corby Town (8)	315
28	Bourne Town (8)	0–2	AFC Rushden & Diamonds (8)	502
29	Coleshill Town (8)	1–0	Sporting Khalsa (8)	115
30	Malvern Town (8)	5–1	Loughborough Students (8)	284
31	Shepshed Dynamo (8)	0–4	Anstey Nomads (8)	364
32	Matlock Town (8)	3–0	Grimsby Borough (8)	492
33	Ware (8)	1–5	Hadley (8)	170
34	Hertford Town (8)	1–3	Felixstowe & Walton United (8)	377
35	Maldon & Tiptree (8)	0–1	AFC Dunstable (8)	553
36	Takeley (8)	0–2	Welwyn Garden City (8)	176
37	Stotfold (8)	0–2	Mildenhall Town (8)	164
39	Biggleswade Town (8)	1–3	Hitchin Town (8)	303
40	Grays Athletic (8)	2–1	Milton Keynes Irish (8)	182

Tie	Home team	Score	Away team	Att.
41	Witham Town (8)	2–2 (4–1 p)	Newmarket Town (8)	103
42	Stanway Rovers (8)	4–0	Aylesbury United (8)	149
43	Walthamstow (8)	3–2	Downham Town (8)	328
44	Concord Rangers (8)	2–2 (2–4 p)	Biggleswade (8)	133
45	Lowestoft Town (8)	2–0	Leverstock Green (8)	336
46	Redbridge (8)	1–4	Waltham Abbey (8)	86
47	London Lions (8)	0–3	Tilbury (8)	82
48	Brightlingsea Regent (8)	0–3	Leighton Town (8)	161
49	Bowers & Pitsea (8)	0–3	Cambridge City (8)	173
50	Kingstonian (8)	1–0	Merstham (8)	247
51	Jersey Bulls (8)	3–1	Hastings United (8)	687
52	Leatherhead (8)	4–0	Raynes Park Vale (8)	435
54	Harrow Borough (8)	1–0	Eastbourne Town (8)	160
55	Hassocks (8)	1–3	Crowborough Athletic (8)	318
56	VCD Athletic (8)	0–0 (5–4 p)	Rayners Lane (8)	58
57	Moneyfields (8)	4–5	Thame United (8)	123
59	Herne Bay (8)	0–3	Ashford United (8)	382
61	Erith Town (8)	1–1 (3–4 p)	Deal Town (8)	97
62	Bedfont Sports (8)	0–0 (4–2 p)	Horndean (8)	137
64	Fareham Town (8)	4–1	Beaconsfield Town (8)	304
65	East Grinstead Town (8)	3–3 (4–2 p)	Binfield (8)	149
66	South Park (Reigate) (8)	1–2	Broadbridge Heath (8)	169
67	Sittingbourne (8)	2–1	Faversham Town (8)	354
68	Westfield (8)	4–2	Margate (8)	134
69	Northwood (8)	0–1	Beckenham Town (8)	138
70	AFC Portchester (8)	1–0	Flackwell Heath (8)	309
71	Hayes & Yeading United (8)	1–0	Metropolitan Police (8)	171
72	Brixham (8)	0–4	Falmouth Town (8)	173
73	Tavistock (8)	1–1 (8–7 p)	Larkhall Athletic (8)	75
74	Bristol Manor Farm (8)	0–2	Shaftesbury (8)	232
75	Hartpury (8)	2–1	Didcot Town (8)	175
Match played at Didcot Town.
76	Willand Rovers (8)	1–1 (4–5 p)	Bishop's Cleeve (8)	150
77	Bideford (8)	3–1	Mousehole (8)	261
78	Exmouth Town (8)	1–1 (3–4 p)	Swindon Supermarine (8)	203
79	Winchester City (8)	2–0	Frome Town (8)	333
80	Portishead Town (8)	4–0	Melksham Town (8)	234
Sunday 7 September 2025
14	Pontefract Collieries (8)	0–2	Lower Breck (8)	131
58	Littlehampton Town (8)	1–2	Hendon (8)	301
60	Southall (8)	0–0 (5–4 p)	AFC Whyteleafe (8)	142
63	Bognor Regis Town (8)	2–2 (8–7 p)	Sevenoaks Town (8)	232
Tuesday 16 September 2025
12	Wythenshawe Town (8)	1–2	Bury (8)	347

== Second qualifying round ==
The draw for the second qualifying round was made on 8 September 2025.

Tie	Home team (Tier)	Score	Away team (Tier)	Att.
Friday 19 September 2025
3	Stalybridge Celtic (8)	0–3	Lower Breck (8)	517
7	Bridlington Town (8)	2–0	North Ferriby (8)	645
18	Biggleswade (8)	3–1	Hitchin Town (8)	316
20	Enfield (8)	1–3	AFC Dunstable (8)	98
Saturday 20 September 2025
34	Harrow Borough (8)	4–0	Jersey Bulls (8)	166
1	Heaton Stannington (8)	4–0	Newton Aycliffe (8)	287
2	Bradford (Park Avenue) (8)	2–0	Consett (8)	196
4	Witton Albion (8)	0–1	Dunston (8)	308
5	Runcorn Linnets (8)	A–A	Bury (8)	1,005
6	Congleton Town (8)	1–3	Clitheroe (8)	374
8	Silsden (8)	3–0	Nantwich Town (8)	144
9	Shifnal Town (8)	2–1	Carlton Town (8)	106
10	Corby Town (8)	3–0	Sutton Coldfield Town (8)	424
11	Lincoln United (8)	0–2	Malvern Town (8)	131
12	Rugby Town (8)	3–2	Belper Town (8)	242
13	Coleshill Town (8)	3–4	AFC Rushden & Diamonds (8)	111
14	Bedworth United (8)	0–3	Anstey Nomads (8)	152
15	Matlock Town (8)	1–3	Basford United (8)	459
16	Sporting Club Inkberrow (8)	4–3	Stafford Rangers (8)	171
17	Grays Athletic (8)	2–0	Felixstowe & Walton United (8)	194
19	Welwyn Garden City (8)	2–2 (3–4 p)	Tilbury (8)	118

Tie	Home team (Tier)	Score	Away team (Tier)	Att.
21	Waltham Abbey (8)	4–1	Lowestoft Town (8)	140
22	Walthamstow (8)	5–3	Leighton Town (8)	252
23	Cambridge City (8)	3–3 (4–5 p)	Witham Town (8)	381
24	Stanway Rovers (8)	3–0	Mildenhall Town (8)	94
25	Hadley (8)	2–2 (7–6 p)	Ascot United (8)	122
26	Leatherhead (8)	2–0	Kingstonian (8)	450
27	East Grinstead Town (8)	1–2	VCD Athletic (8)	133
28	Deal Town (8)	2–3	Ashford United (8)	454
29	Hayes & Yeading United (8)	5–1	Southall (8)	205
30	Broadbridge Heath (8)	2–1	Bedfont Sports (8)	75
31	Crowborough Athletic (8)	1–6	Sittingbourne (8)	242
32	Beckenham Town (8)	2–5	Hendon (8)	271
33	Westfield (8)	1–1 (4–3 p)	Bognor Regis Town (8)	152
35	Swindon Supermarine (8)	1–1 (4–5 p)	Bideford (8)	225
36	Hartpury (8)	4–2	Portishead Town (8)	113
37	Thame United (8)	3–1	Winchester City (8)	102
38	Fareham Town (8)	2–5	Bishop's Cleeve (8)	189
39	Shaftesbury (8)	2–2 (4–1 p)	Falmouth Town (8)	125
40	AFC Portchester (8)	3–0	Tavistock (8)	225
Saturday 4 October 2025
5	Runcorn Linnets (8)	7–0	Bury (8)	825

== Third qualifying round ==
The draw for the third qualifying round was made on 22 September 2025.

Tie	Home team (Tier)	Score	Away team (Tier)	Att.
Friday 3 October 2025
10	Bradford (Park Avenue) (8)	2–1	Heaton Stannington (8)	163
24	Worcester City (7)	2–2 (3–0 p)	Rugby Town (8)	561
Saturday 4 October 2025
1	Hyde United (7)	1–0	Warrington Town (7)	396
2	Ashton United (7)	1–2	Clitheroe (8)	226
3	Dunston (8)	2–1	Warrington Rylands (7)	241
5	Stockton Town (7)	2–0	Lower Breck (8)	409
8	Widnes (7)	W/O (Note: Bamber Bridge awarded a walkover due to Widnes withdrawing from the competition.)	Bamber Bridge (7)	NA
9	Bridlington Town (8)	2–4	Guiseley (7)	417
11	Whitby Town (7)	1–2	Hebburn Town (7)	281
13	Evesham United (7)	0–2	Ilkeston Town (7)	295
14	Gainsborough Trinity (7)	3–2	Shifnal Town (8)	417
15	Barwell (7)	0–3	Bromsgrove Sporting (7)	150
16	Sporting Club Inkberrow (8)	1–2	Stratford Town (7)	250
17	Rushall Olympic (7)	0–2	Spalding United (7)	202
18	Anstey Nomads (8)	3–2	Stourbridge (7)	215
19	Quorn (7)	2–2 (3–5 p)	Corby Town (8)	264
20	Real Bedford (7)	3–1	Stamford (7)	278
21	AFC Rushden & Diamonds (8)	3–1	Malvern Town (8)	372
22	Halesowen Town (7)	1–2	Leek Town (7)	699
23	St Ives Town (7)	1–0	Kettering Town (7)	332
25	Basford United (8)	0–0 (4–5 p)	Alvechurch (7)	171
26	Harborough Town (7)	2–0	Hednesford Town (7)	501
27	Cleethorpes Town (7)	0–0 (4–5 p)	Redditch United (7)	133
28	Stanway Rovers (8)	0–0 (5–3 p)	Uxbridge (7)	88
29	Royston Town (7)	0–3	Welling United (7)	288
30	Hanwell Town (7)	2–1	Grays Athletic (8)	212
31	Westfield (8)	1–2	Brentwood Town (7)	165
32	Leatherhead (8)	4–1	Ramsgate (7)	489
33	Aveley (7)	0–2	St Albans City (7)	250
34	Carshalton Athletic (7)	1–2	Cheshunt (7)	312
35	Broadbridge Heath (7)	1–3	Billericay Town (7)	176
36	Hadley (8)	2–1	Dartford (7)	238

Tie	Home team (Tier)	Score	Away team (Tier)	Att.
37	Harrow Borough (8)	3–1	Witham Town (8)	122
38	Lewes (7)	1–2	Leiston (7)	479
39	Cray Valley Paper Mills (7)	1–0	Berkhamsted (7)	113
40	AFC Sudbury (7)	4–0	Bury Town (7)	461
41	Chertsey Town (7)	1–2	Tilbury (8)	410
42	Burgess Hill Town (7)	1–1 (4–3 p)	Potters Bar Town (7)	402
43	Bishop's Stortford (7)	4–0	Cray Wanderers (7)	266
44	Wingate & Finchley (7)	4–1	VCD Athletic (8)	67
45	Chatham Town (7)	0–0 (4–2 p)	Needham Market (7)	402
46	Ashford United (8)	3–3 (4–2 p)	Biggleswade (8)	262
47	Hayes & Yeading United (8)	0–0 (3–4 p)	Walton & Hersham (7)	220
48	Sittingbourne (8)	1–0	Hashtag United (7)	299
49	Waltham Abbey (8)	6–0	Walthamstow (8)	198
50	Whitehawk (7)	0–2	Canvey Island (7)	234
51	Dulwich Hamlet (7)	0–1	Hendon (8)	1,185
52	AFC Dunstable (8)	1–3	Folkestone Invicta (7)	118
53	Bracknell Town (7)	6–3	Hungerford Town (7)	349
54	Basingstoke Town (7)	2–1	Shaftesbury (8)	338
55	Hartpury (8)	0–0 (4–5 p)	Gloucester City (7)	550
56	Plymouth Parkway (7)	3–2	Gosport Borough (7)	217
57	Dorchester Town (7)	4–0	Bideford (8)	364
58	Thame United (8)	0–2	Banbury United (7)	190
59	Bishop's Cleeve (8)	2–1	Sholing (7)	182
60	Yate Town (7)	1–2	Poole Town (7)	259
61	AFC Portchester (8)	2–1	Taunton Town (7)	230
62	Chichester City (7)	2–4	Farnham Town (7)	602
63	Havant & Waterlooville (7)	4–2	Tiverton Town (7)	286
64	Wimborne Town (7)	2–0	Weymouth (7)	722
Tuesday 7 October 2025
4	Workington (7)	0–2	FC United of Manchester (7)	588
7	Runcorn Linnets (8)	1–1 (1–3 p)	Morpeth Town (7)	458
6	Silsden (8)	1–1 (4–5 p)	Stocksbridge Park Steels (7)	114
12	Prescot Cables (7)	2–0	Lancaster City (7)	416

== First round proper ==
The draw for the first round proper was made on 6 October 2025.

Number of teams per tier still in competition
Tier 5	Tier 6	Tier 7	Tier 8	Total
24 / 24	48 / 48	47 / 47	17 / 17	136 / 136

Tie	Home team (Tier)	Score	Away team (Tier)	Att.
Friday 24 October 2025
5	Dunston (8)	1–0	Hebburn Town (7)	533
Saturday 25 October 2025
1	Hyde United (7)	0–3	Stocksbridge Park Steels (7)	352
2	Clitheroe (8)	4–2	Stockton Town (7)	642
3	FC United of Manchester (7)	1–0	Bamber Bridge (7)	1,046
4	Prescot Cables (7)	2–1	Guiseley (7)	411
6	Bradford (Park Avenue) (8)	1–1 (4–2 p)	Morpeth Town (7)	255
7	Spalding United (7)	0–1	Corby Town (8)	627
8	Leek Town (7)	3–0	Bromsgrove Sporting (7)	406
9	Ilkeston Town (7)	3–1	St Ives Town (7)	375
10	Anstey Nomads (8)	4–0	Stratford Town (7)	215
11	Redditch United (7)	1–2	Gainsborough Trinity (7)	426
12	Alvechurch (7)	0–0 (4–3 p)	Worcester City (7)	412
13	Harborough Town (7)	4–1	AFC Rushden & Diamonds (8)	702
14	Sittingbourne (8)	2–1	Cray Valley Paper Mills (7)	228
15	Real Bedford (7)	3–2	Ashford United (8)	230
16	Brentwood Town (7)	3–0	Welling United (7)	470

Tie	Home team (Tier)	Score	Away team (Tier)	Att.
17	Leatherhead (8)	1–1 (4–2 p)	Canvey Island (7)	526
18	AFC Sudbury (7)	2–1	Leiston (7)	245
19	Wingate & Finchley (7)	0–1	Cheshunt (7)	212
Match played at Cheshunt.
20	Stanway Rovers (8)	1–2	Harrow Borough (8)	115
21	Tilbury (8)	1–0	Hadley (8)	202
22	Waltham Abbey (8)	0–2	Chatham Town (7)	222
23	Billericay Town (7)	0–5	Bishop's Stortford (7)	726
24	St Albans City (7)	0–2	Hanwell Town (7)	647
25	Burgess Hill Town (7)	1–4	Folkestone Invicta (7)	462
26	Walton & Hersham (7)	5–1	Hendon (8)	467
28	Basingstoke Town (7)	A–A	Dorchester Town (7)	417
29	Plymouth Parkway (7)	1–1 (7–6 p)	Poole Town (7)	368
30	Wimborne Town (7)	1–0	AFC Portchester (8)	572
31	Gloucester City (7)	1–0	Havant & Waterlooville (7)	615
32	Farnham Town (7)	2–2 (3–1 p)	Bishop's Cleeve (8)	425
Sunday 26 October 2025
27	Bracknell Town (7)	1–0	Banbury United (7)	468
Tuesday 28 October 2025
28	Basingstoke Town (7)	1–1 (4–5 p)	Dorchester Town (7)	364

== Second round proper ==
The draw for the second round proper was made on 27 October 2025.

Number of teams per tier still in competition
Tier 5	Tier 6	Tier 7	Tier 8	Total
24 / 24	48 / 48	25 / 47	9 / 17	104 / 136

Tie	Home team	Score	Away team	Att.
Saturday 15 November 2025
1	FC United of Manchester (7)	3–2	Darlington (6)	1,322
2	Chester (6)	0–1	Clitheroe (8)	1,381
3	Macclesfield (6)	1–0	Prescot Cables (7)	1,080
5	Chorley (6)	2–3	Worksop Town (6)	740
6	Leek Town (7)	1–0	Scarborough Athletic (6)	491
7	Radcliffe (6)	2–2 (6–5 p)	Bradford (Park Avenue) (8)	535
8	Buxton (6)	2–3	Southport (6)	527
9	Spennymoor Town (6)	2–3	AFC Fylde (6)	484
10	South Shields (6)	6–2	Dunston (8)	1,203
11	Marine (6)	2–0	Stocksbridge Park Steels (7)	776
12	Ilkeston Town (7)	0–1	Curzon Ashton (6)	442
13	King's Lynn Town (6)	2–2 (2–3 p)	Harrow Borough (8)	751
14	Merthyr Town (6)	2–3	Hanwell Town (7)	617
15	Slough Town (6)	1–1 (3–4 p)	Gloucester City (7)	523
16	Kidderminster Harriers (6)	3–0	Corby Town (8)	1,496
17	Bedford Town (6)	0–1	Anstey Nomads (8)	502
18	Chesham United (6)	1–2	AFC Telford United (6)	468
19	Brentwood Town (7)	0–0 (2–4 p)	Hornchurch (6)	1,305
20	AFC Sudbury (7)	1–5	Hereford (6)	315
21	Leamington (6)	2–0	Maidenhead United (6)	412

Tie	Home team	Score	Away team	Att.
22	Oxford City (6)	1–2	Peterborough Sports (6)	412
23	Bishop's Stortford (7)	1–1 (4–5 p)	Cheshunt (7)	863
24	Hemel Hempstead Town (6)	0–0 (6–5 p)	Chelmsford City (6)	678
25	Alvechurch (7)	1–1 (4–3 p)	Real Bedford (7)	204
26	Harborough Town (7)	3–0	Enfield Town (6)	794
27	Dagenham & Redbridge (6)	2–0	Tilbury (8)	1,091
28	Walton & Hersham (7)	2–1	Farnborough (6)	836
29	Horsham (6)	2–0	Farnham Town (7)	1,020
30	Dover Athletic (6)	2–0	Dorchester Town (7)	405
31	Torquay United (6)	0–2	Maidstone United (6)	1,624
32	Chippenham Town (6)	0–1	Weston-super-Mare (6)	658
33	Wimborne Town (7)	0–1	Chatham Town (7)	858
34	Plymouth Parkway (7)	4–3	Salisbury (6)	518
35	Bath City (6)	1–1 (5–3 p)	Bracknell Town (7)	805
36	Ebbsfleet United (6)	1–1 (5–3 p)	Sittingbourne (8)	1,047
37	Folkestone Invicta (7)	1–2	AFC Totton (6)	1,053
38	Dorking Wanderers (6)	3–2	Eastbourne Borough (6)	1,624
39	Tonbridge Angels (6)	0–4	Worthing (6)	710
40	Leatherhead (8)	2–0	Hampton & Richmond Borough (6)	868
Tuesday 18 November 2025
4	Gainsborough Trinity (7)	1–2	Alfreton Town (6)	516

=== Upsets ===
Giantkiller (tier)	Opponent (tier)
Upset of two leagues above
Anstey Nomads (level 8)	1–0 away vs Bedford Town (level 6)
Clitheroe (level 8)	1–0 away vs Chester (level 6)
Harrow Borough (level 8)	2–2 (3–2 on penalties) away vs King's Lynn Town (level 6)
Leatherhead (level 8)	2–0 home vs Hampton & Richmond Borough (level 6)

== Third round proper ==
The draw for the third round proper was made on 17 November 2025. There were four teams from the eighth tier still in the competition, with at least one going through into the fourth round due to Leatherhead and Harrow Borough playing each other.

Number of teams per tier still in competition
Tier 5	Tier 6	Tier 7	Tier 8	Total
24 / 24	26 / 48	10 / 47	4 / 17	64 / 136

Tie	Home team	Score	Away team	Att.
Saturday 13 December 2025
29	Ebbsfleet United (6)	3–1	Braintree Town (5)	572
1	Solihull Moors (5)	2–2 (8–9 p)	AFC Fylde (6)	322
2	Harborough Town (7)	1–2	Carlisle United (5)	1,726
3	Alvechurch (7)	2–2 (4–1 p)	Alfreton Town (6)	214
4	Hartlepool United (5)	1–2	Anstey Nomads (8)	1,001
5	South Shields (6)	0–1	Macclesfield (6)	754
6	Clitheroe (8)	1–1 (4–3 p)	York City (5)	2,071
7	Scunthorpe United (5)	5–0	Peterborough Sports (6)	1,167
8	Worksop Town (6)	0–0 (1–4 p)	Kidderminster Harriers (6)	577
9	Curzon Ashton (6)	1–2	Marine (6)	344
10	Hereford (6)	1–1 (4–2 p)	Radcliffe (6)	1,105
11	Leamington (6)	0–1	Rochdale (5)	421
12	Southport (6)	3–1	Leek Town (7)	950
13	Tamworth (5)	1–1 (5–4 p)	Boston United (5)	715
14	FC Halifax Town (5)	4–0	FC United of Manchester (7)	1,507
15	AFC Telford United (6)	4–3	Altrincham (5)	1,167

Tie	Home team	Score	Away team	Att.
16	Gateshead (5)	0–3	Morecambe (5)	363
17	Boreham Wood (5)	3–3 (1–3 p)	Brackley Town (5)	458
18	Leatherhead (8)	3–2	Harrow Borough (8)	863
19	Yeovil Town (5)	1–1 (4–2 p)	Maidstone United (6)	1,691
20	Forest Green Rovers (5)	4–0	Weston-super-Mare (6)	973
21	Hemel Hempstead Town (6)	0–2	Horsham (6)	550
22	Chatham Town (7)	3–0	Plymouth Parkway (7)	402
23	Wealdstone (5)	2–1	Cheshunt (7)	621
24	Dorking Wanderers (6)	1–1 (2–4 p)	Bath City (6)	683
25	Woking (5)	2–0	AFC Totton (6)	1,020
26	Dagenham & Redbridge (6)	3–1	Hanwell Town (7)	826
27	Eastleigh (5)	2–1	Aldershot Town (5)	1,194
28	Southend United (5)	4–0	Truro City (5)	3,715
30	Walton & Hersham (7)	4–1	Sutton United (5)	1,260
31	Gloucester City (7)	3–3 (5–3 p)	Worthing (6)	549
32	Dover Athletic (6)	1–4	Hornchurch (6)	392

=== Upsets ===
Giantkiller (tier)	Opponent (tier)
Upset of two leagues above
Anstey Nomads (level 8)	2–1 away vs Hartlepool United (level 5)
Clitheroe (level 8)	1–1 (4–3 on penalties) home vs York City (level 5)
Walton & Hersham (level 7)	4–1 home vs Sutton United (level 5)

== Fourth round proper ==
The draw for the third round proper was made on 15 December 2025. Three teams from the eighth tier, Anstey Nomads, Clitheroe, and Leatherhead, remained in the competition.

Number of teams per tier still in competition
Tier 5	Tier 6	Tier 7	Tier 8	Total
13 / 24	12 / 48	4 / 47	3 / 17	32 / 136

Tie	Home team	Score	Away team	Att.
Saturday 10 January 2026
2	Walton & Hersham (7)	1–0	Brackley Town (5)	1,181
4	Yeovil Town (5)	0–0 (3–1 p)	Alvechurch (7)	1,870
6	Marine (6)	1–1 (4–3 p)	Gloucester City (7)	968
8	Chatham Town (7)	1–0	Carlisle United (5)	1,703
9	Wealdstone (5)	1–0	Dagenham & Redbridge (6)	891
11	Ebbsfleet United (6)	0–2	Forest Green Rovers (5)	887
12	Hereford (6)	2–2 (3–4 p)	AFC Fylde (6)	1,372
15	Leatherhead (8)	2–3	Horsham (6)	1,613
Tuesday 13 January 2026
1	Bath City (6)	1–3	Southend United (5)	1,131
5	Eastleigh (5)	0–2	Southport (6)	749
7	Kidderminster Harriers (6)	6–2	Morecambe (5)	1,596
13	Tamworth (5)	1–1 (7–6 p)	Rochdale (5)	534
14	FC Halifax Town (5)	4–0	Anstey Nomads (8)	683
16	Scunthorpe United (5)	3–1	Clitheroe (8)	1,364
Tuesday 20 January 2026
3	Woking (5)	2–1	Macclesfield (6)	1,144
10	Hornchurch (6)	1–2	AFC Telford United (6)	320

=== Upsets ===
Giantkiller (tier)	Opponent (tier)
Upset of two leagues above
Chatham Town (level 7)	1–0 home vs Carlisle United (level 5)
Walton & Hersham (level 7)	1–0 home vs Brackley Town (level 5)

== Fifth round proper ==
At the time of the draw, there were two teams from the seventh tier still in the competition: Chatham Town and Walton & Hersham.

Number of teams per tier still in competition
Tier 5	Tier 6	Tier 7	Tier 8	Total
8 / 24	6 / 48	2 / 47	0 / 17	16 / 136

Tie	Home team	Score	Away team	Att.
Saturday 31 January 2026
1	Forest Green Rovers (5)	0–3	Wealdstone (5)	1,607
2	Chatham Town (7)	0–1	Southend United (5)	2,135
3	Scunthorpe United (5)	1–2	Horsham (6)	1,890
4	FC Halifax Town (5)	1–1 (3–4 p)	Kidderminster Harriers (6)	1,298
5	Walton & Hersham (7)	1–2	Woking (5)	654
6	AFC Fylde (6)	0–1	Southport (6)	1,602
7	AFC Telford United (6)	0–2	Yeovil Town (5)	2,162
8	Tamworth (5)	0–0 (1–4 p)	Marine (6)	1,120

== Quarter-finals ==
Number of teams per tier still in competition
Tier 5	Tier 6	Tier 7	Tier 8	Total
4 / 24	4 / 48	0 / 47	0 / 17	8 / 136

Tie	Home team	Score	Away team	Att.
Saturday 28 February 2026
1	Southport (6)	1–1 (4–2 p)	Yeovil Town (5)	3,696
2	Marine (6)	1–0	Woking (5)	2,182
3	Kidderminster Harriers (6)	1–1 (5–6 p)	Wealdstone (5)	3,195
4	Horsham (6)	1–2	Southend United (5)	2,580

== Semi-finals ==
Number of teams per tier still in competition
Tier 5	Tier 6	Tier 7	Tier 8	Total
2 / 24	2 / 48	0 / 46	0 / 18	4 / 136

28 March 2026

Southport (6)	1–3	Southend United (5)
Sze 30'; Renshaw (red card) 90+2'		Kendall 53', 75'; Bridge 55'

Haig Avenue, Southport
Attendance: 5,600

28 March 2026

Wealdstone (5)	1–0	Marine (6)
Obiero 90+2'

Grosvenor Vale, Ruislip
Attendance: 4,000

== Final ==
Number of teams per tier still in competition
Tier 5	Tier 6	Tier 7	Tier 8	Total
2 / 24	0 / 48	0 / 46	0 / 18	2 / 136

17 May 2026
16:30 BST

Southend United	0–0	Wealdstone
	Report
Penalties
Bridge (penalty scored); Gubbins (penalty scored); Kendall (penalty missed); Boyes (penalty scored); Scott-Morriss (penalty scored)	4–2	Olomola (penalty missed); Hinchy (penalty missed); Obiero (penalty scored); McAvoy (penalty scored)

Wembley Stadium, London
Attendance: 43,306
Referee: Farai Hallam (Surrey)
