= 2026–27 National League =

BeThe 2026–27 National League season, known as the Enterprise National League for sponsorship reasons, is the 12th season under the title of the National League, the 23rd season consisting of three divisions and the 48th season overall.

Locations of the 2026–27 National League (Red) and Division North (Blue) and South (Green) clubs

== National League ==
National League
- Season: 2026–27
- Matches: 201
- Goals: 614 (3.05 per match)
- Top goalscorer: Matt Rush (10 goals)
- Biggest home win: Yeovil Town 6–0 Boston United (3 October 2026)
- Biggest away win: Wealdstone 0–6 Yeovil Town (10 October 2026)
- Highest scoring: Harrogate Town 5–2 Solihull Moors (8 August 2026); Gateshead 1–6 Southend United (19 September 2026); Carlisle United 2–5 Woking (26 September 2026); Boreham Wood 4–3 Hartlepool United (31 October 2026)
- Longest winning run: 9 games Boreham Wood
- Longest unbeaten run: 18 games Boreham Wood
- Longest winless run: 14 games Gateshead
- Longest losing run: 10 games Gateshead
- Highest attendance: 9,985; Southend United 2–3 Boreham Wood (20 November 2026)
- Lowest attendance: 407; Gateshead 0–1 Altrincham (29 September 2026)
- All statistics correct as of 20 November 2026.

Twenty-four teams are competing in the league – eighteen returning teams from the previous season, two teams relegated from EFL League Two, two teams promoted from the National League North and two teams promoted from the National League South.

=== Team changes ===
To National League

Promoted from National League North

- AFC Fylde
- Kidderminster Harriers

Promoted from National League South

- Worthing
- Hornchurch

Relegated from League Two

- Harrogate Town
- Barrow

From National League

Promoted to League Two

- York City
- Rochdale

Relegated to National League North

- Brackley Town
- Morecambe

Relegated to National League South

- Braintree Town
- Truro City

=== Stadiums and locations ===
Locations of the 2026–27 National League clubs

Team	Location	Stadium	Capacity
AFC Fylde	Wesham	Mill Farm Sports Village	6,000
Aldershot Town	Aldershot	The Recreation Ground	7,100
Altrincham	Altrincham	Moss Lane	7,700
Barrow	Barrow-in-Furness	Holker Street	6,500
Boreham Wood	Borehamwood	Meadow Park	4,500
Boston United	Boston	Boston Community Stadium	5,061
Carlisle United	Carlisle	Brunton Park	17,949
Eastleigh	Eastleigh	Ten Acres	5,250
FC Halifax Town	Halifax	The Shay	10,400
Forest Green Rovers	Nailsworth	The New Lawn	5,147
Gateshead	Gateshead	Gateshead International Stadium	11,800
Harrogate Town	Harrogate	Wetherby Road	5,000
Hartlepool United	Hartlepool	Victoria Park	7,856
Hornchurch	London (Upminster)	Hornchurch Stadium	3,500
Kidderminster Harriers	Kidderminster	Aggborough Stadium	6,444
Scunthorpe United	Scunthorpe	Glanford Park	9,088
Solihull Moors	Solihull	Damson Park	5,500
Southend United	Southend-on-Sea	Roots Hall	12,392
Sutton United	London (Sutton)	Gander Green Lane	5,013
Tamworth	Tamworth	The Lamb Ground	4,565
Wealdstone	London (Ruislip)	Grosvenor Vale	4,085
Woking	Woking	Kingfield Stadium	6,036
Worthing	Worthing	Woodside Road	4,000
Yeovil Town	Yeovil	Huish Park	9,566

=== Managerial changes ===
Team	Outgoing manager	Manner of departure	Date of vacancy	Position in table	Incoming manager	Date of appointment
Aldershot Town	(England) John Coleman	Mutual consent	25 April 2026	Pre-season	(Republic of Ireland) Scott Davies	27 April 2026
Eastleigh	(England) Richard Hill	End of interim spell	25 April 2026	Pre-season	(England) Matt Gray	14 May 2026
Hartlepool United	(England) Nicky Featherstone	Mutual consent	25 April 2026	Pre-season	(England) Lee Clark	14 May 2026
FC Halifax Town	(England) Adam Lakeland	Signed byMorecambe	30 April 2026	Pre-season	(Republic of Ireland) John McGrath	19 May 2026
Barrow	(Republic of Ireland) Sam Foley	End of interim spell	2 May 2026	Pre-season	(England) Adam Murray	12 May 2026
Kidderminster Harriers	(England) Adam Murray	Signed by Barrow	12 May 2026	Pre-season	(England) Paul Wotton	26 May 2026
Southend United	(Republic of Ireland) Kevin Maher	Sacked	19 May 2026	Pre-season	(England) Kieron Dyer	8 June 2026
Gateshead	(Republic of Ireland) Rob Elliot	Resigned	27 May 2026	Pre-season	(England) Lee Cattermole	16 June 2026
Carlisle United	(Wales) Mark Hughes	Mutual consent	28 May 2026	Pre-season	(Republic of Ireland) Rob Elliot	28 May 2026
Woking	(England) Jermain Defoe	Mutual consent	23 July 2026	Pre-season	(England) Craig Ross (interim) (Note: Jake Hyde was appointed joint interim alongside Ross, but resigned on 1 November 2026 due to personal reasons.)	24 July 2026
Hartlepool United	(England) Lee Clark	Resigned	19 September 2026	19th	(England) Adam Clayton & (England) Gary Liddle (interim)	21 September 2026
Hartlepool United	(England) Adam Clayton & (England) Gary Liddle	End of interim spell	1 October 2026	22nd	(England) Pete Wild	1 October 2026
Forest Green Rovers	(Wales) Robbie Savage	Signed by Peterborough United	2 October 2026	13th	(Scotland) Jonathan Gould & (England) Yan Klukowski (interim)	29 September 2026 (Note: Forest Green Rovers announced Savage's departure on 29 September 2026, but he was not signed by Peterborough United until 2 October 2026. Gould therefore took charge of their game against Wealdstone on 29 September.)
Gateshead	(England) Lee Cattermole	Sacked	4 October 2026	24th	(England) Ben Clark (interim)	4 October 2026
Scunthorpe United	(England) Andy Butler	Sacked	28 October 2026	22nd	(England) Jacob Butterfield & (England) Ross Barrows	29 October 2026
Scunthorpe United	(England) Jacob Butterfield & (England) Ross Barrows	End of interim spell	12 November 2026	23rd	(England) Andy Preece	12 November 2026
Eastleigh	(England) Matt Gray	Sacked	15 November 2026	18th		
Gateshead	(England) Ben Clark	End of interim spell	17 November 2026	24th	(England) Alun Armstrong	17 November 2026

=== League table ===
Pos	Team	Pld	W	D	L	GF	GA	GD	Pts	Promotion, qualification or relegation
1	Boreham Wood	18	15	3	0	49	21	+28	48	Promotion to EFL League Two
2	Harrogate Town	17	11	2	4	38	23	+15	35	Qualification for National League play-off semi-finals
3	Southend United	18	9	5	4	42	31	+11	32	Qualification for National League play-off semi-finals
4	AFC Fylde	17	10	2	5	32	25	+7	32	Qualification for the National League play-off quarter-finals
5	Yeovil Town	17	8	5	4	37	22	+15	29	Qualification for the National League play-off quarter-finals
6	Carlisle United	17	8	5	4	34	23	+11	29	Qualification for the National League play-off quarter-finals
7	Worthing	17	8	5	4	33	26	+7	29	Qualification for the National League play-off quarter-finals
8	Barrow	16	8	4	4	29	19	+10	28	
9	Altrincham	17	9	1	7	24	28	−4	28	
10	FC Halifax Town	17	7	4	6	29	21	+8	25	
11	Sutton United	17	7	3	7	20	23	−3	24	
12	Hornchurch	17	8	0	9	20	27	−7	24	
13	Kidderminster Harriers	17	5	7	5	18	17	+1	22	
14	Woking	16	6	3	7	25	24	+1	21	
15	Aldershot Town	17	6	3	8	20	21	−1	21	
16	Forest Green Rovers	14	5	4	5	23	24	−1	19	
17	Wealdstone	17	5	4	8	24	30	−6	19	
18	Eastleigh	17	5	4	8	20	27	−7	19	
19	Boston United	17	5	3	9	21	31	−10	18	
20	Tamworth	16	5	2	9	26	34	−8	17	
21	Hartlepool United	17	5	1	11	19	28	−9	16	Relegation to National League North/National League South
22	Solihull Moors	17	5	1	11	21	40	−19	16	Relegation to National League North/National League South
23	Scunthorpe United	16	3	2	11	20	31	−11	11	Relegation to National League North/National League South
24	Gateshead	16	1	1	14	9	37	−28	4	Relegation to National League North/National League South

Updated to match(es) played on 20 November 2026. Source: National League official site
Rules for classification: 1) Points; 2) Goal difference; 3) Number of goals scored; 4) Number of matches won; 5) Head-to-head results

=== Results ===
Home \ Away	FYL	ALD	ALT	BAR	BOR	BOS	CAR	EAS	HAL	FGR	GAT	HRG	HPU	HOR	KID	SCU	SOL	SOU	SUT	TAM	WEA	WOK	WOR	YEO
AFC Fylde	—		1–2				0–2			2–0			3–1	3–1		2–0					2–2		2–2	
Aldershot Town		—					1–3		1–0		1–0	3–1	0–1							5–1	0–1			1–1
Altrincham		3–1	—				2–4	2–1	2–1				2–1	3–0	0–0			1–3						
Barrow		1–0		—				1–1						1–2		3–0			3–0		2–1			1–2
Boreham Wood	4–0		3–1		—	2–1	2–1					4–1	4–3		3–1					3–3				
Boston United	0–1	0–1	1–0			—					2–1			2–3		2–1		1–2			1–3	1–1		
Carlisle United						2–0	—			1–1		3–0		4–1	0–0	4–2		2–2				2–5	2–3	
Eastleigh	1–2	1–1			1–1	4–2	1–0	—			2–1					3–2		1–1				1–3		
FC Halifax Town				2–3	1–3	1–1			—		4–1		1–0	3–0					1–1	4–1				2–0
Forest Green Rovers			1–2		0–3	1–3		2–0	3–2	—	4–0	2–2	2–4								1–1			
Gateshead			0–1	0–3							—						1–1	1–6	0–1			2–0	1–2	
Harrogate Town	1–2		4–0	2–2				4–1			2–1	—		3–0			5–2		3–1	3–1				
Hartlepool United				2–0				0–1				0–1	—	2–1						0–1	1–1	1–0	1–3	
Hornchurch		2–1						2–0		0–1				—	3–0	1–0				2–1		1–0		1–2
Kidderminster Harriers		1–1		1–1				1–0	1–1		1–0		2–0		—				1–1				1–2	0–1
Scunthorpe United					1–2							0–2	4–1			—	3–1					2–3	1–1	1–1
Solihull Moors	1–3	1–2		1–0	0–3	0–2	1–2		0–2						2–1		—	1–3						
Southend United	3–1	2–1		2–4	2–3				2–2						1–3	1–0		—		3–1				3–2
Sutton United		2–0	1–0		0–2			2–1		3–3			2–1			0–2	0–2		—		0–2			
Tamworth	1–2			1–2		2–2										4–1			2–0	—	2–1	0–1	3–2	
Wealdstone							1–1		0–1		4–0	1–3			1–4		2–3	3–2			—			0–6
Woking	3–2		5–1		1–2							0–1			0–0		2–4	1–1	0–3			—		
Worthing				2–2	2–3				2–1	1–2				1–0			5–0	3–3	0–3		1–0		—	
Yeovil Town	1–4		1–2		2–2	6–0	1–1				3–0						4–1			3–2			1–1	—

Updated to match(es) played on 20 November 2026. Source: National League official site
Legend: Blue = home team win; Yellow = draw; Red = away team win.
For upcoming matches, an "a" indicates there is an article about the rivalry between the two participants.

=== Season statistics ===
As of 21 November 2026

=== Top goalscorers ===
Rank	Player	Club	Goals
1	(England) Matt Rush	Boreham Wood	10
2	(England) Aaron Blair	Eastleigh	9
2	(England) Luke McCormick	Yeovil Town; AFC Fylde	9
2	(England) Lewis Walker	Kidderminster Harriers	9
5	(England) Leon Chambers-Parillon	Southend United	8
5	(England) Kieren Donnelly	Tamworth	8
5	(England) John Marquis	Woking	8
5	(England) Johl Powell	Yeovil Town	8
5	(England) Ben Tollitt	FC Halifax Town	8
5	(England) Ben Whitfield	Boreham Wood	8

=== Monthly awards ===
Each month the Enterprise National League announces their official Player of the Month and Manager of the Month.

Month	Manager of the Month		Player of the Month		Reference
August	(Republic of Ireland) Daryl McMahon	Hornchurch	(England) Matt Rush	Boreham Wood	
September	(Wales) Neil Gibson	Altrincham	(England) Ben Whitfield	Boreham Wood	
October	(England) Luke Garrard	Boreham Wood	(England) Zak Brunt	Boreham Wood	

== National League North ==
National League North
- Season: 2026–27

The National League North consists of 24 teams.

=== Team changes ===
To National League North

Relegated from the National League

- Brackley Town
- Morecambe

Promoted from the Northern Premier League Premier Division

- Hebburn Town
- Hednesford Town

Promoted from the Southern League Premier Division Central

- Harborough Town
- Spalding United

From National League North

Promoted to the National League

- AFC Fylde
- Kidderminster Harriers

Relegated to the Northern Premier League Premier Division

- Curzon Ashton
- Alfreton Town

Relegated to the Southern League Premier Division Central

- Peterborough Sports
- Leamington

=== Stadiums and locations ===
Locations of the National League North 2026–27 teams

Team	Location	Stadium	Capacity
AFC Telford United	Telford	New Bucks Head	6,300
Bedford Town	Bedford	The Eyrie	3,000
Brackley Town	Brackley	St. James Park	3,500
Buxton	Buxton	The Silverlands	5,200
Chester	Chester	Deva Stadium	5,400
Chorley	Chorley	Victory Park	4,100
Darlington	Darlington	Blackwell Meadows	3,300
Harborough Town	Market Harborough	Bowden Park	2,400
Hebburn Town	Hebburn	The Green Energy Sports Ground	3,000
Hednesford Town	Hednesford	Keys Park	6,039
Hereford	Hereford	Edgar Street	5,250
King's Lynn Town	King's Lynn	The Walks	8,200
Macclesfield	Macclesfield	Moss Rose	5,300
Marine	Crosby	Rossett Park	3,000
Merthyr Town	Merthyr Tydfil	Penydarren Park	4,000
Morecambe	Morecambe	Mazuma Mobile Stadium	6,476
Oxford City	Oxford (Marston)	Marsh Lane	3,500
Radcliffe	Radcliffe	Stainton Park	3,500
Scarborough Athletic	Scarborough	Scarborough Sports Village	3,251
South Shields	South Shields	Mariners Park	4,000
Southport	Southport	Haig Avenue	6,008
Spalding United	Spalding	Sir Halley Stewart Field	2,700
Spennymoor Town	Spennymoor	The Brewery Field	4,300
Worksop Town	Worksop	Sandy Lane	3,400

=== Managerial changes ===
Team	Outgoing manager	Manner of departure	Date of vacancy	Position in table	Incoming manager	Date of appointment
Morecambe	(England) Jim Bentley	Resigned	25 April 2026	Pre-season	(England) Adam Lakeland	30 April 2026
Bedford Town	(England) Lee Bircham	Resigned	25 April 2026	Pre-season	(England) Harry Smart	5 May 2026
Chester	(Wales) Connell Rawlinson	End of interim spell	29 April 2026	Pre-season	(England) Phil Parkinson	4 May 2026
Buxton	(Republic of Ireland) John McGrath	Signed by FC Halifax Town	19 May 2026	Pre-season	(England) Jordan Broadbent	5 June 2026
South Shields	(England) Ian Watson	Signed by Rochdale	9 June 2026	Pre-season	(England) Mike Williamson	14 June 2026
Radcliffe	(England) Bernard Morley	Resigned	19 August 2026	24th	(Wales) Nicky Adams (interim)	19 August 2026
Spennymoor Town	(England) Tommy Miller	Resigned	2 September 2026	22nd	(England) Jason Ainsley (interim)	2 September 2026
Southport	(Guyana) Neil Danns	Resigned	6 September 2026	22nd	(England) Mark Duffy (Note: Duffy took interim charge on 6 September 2026 before being appointed permanently on 1 October 2026.)	6 September 2026
Brackley Town	(England) Andy Whing	Resigned	18 September 2026	21st	(England) Gareth Dean	18 September 2026
Spennymoor Town	(England) Jason Ainsley	End of interim spell	29 September 2026	23rd	(England) Peter Hartley	29 September 2026
Radcliffe	(Wales) Nicky Adams	End of interim spell	3 October 2026	24th	(England) Grant Shenton	3 October 2026
Darlington	(England) Steve Watson	Mutual consent	19 October 2026	23rd	(England) Terry Mitchell (interim)	19 October 2026
Southport	(England) Mark Duffy	Mutual consent	20 October 2026	22nd	(England) Calum McIntyre	29 October 2026
Darlington	(England) Terry Mitchell	End of interim spell	6 November 2026	22nd	(England) Craig Elliott	6 November 2026
Chorley	(England) Andy Preece	Signed by Scunthorpe United	12 November 2026	13th	(England) Jamie Vermiglio (interim)	12 November 2026

=== League table ===
Pos	Team	Pld	W	D	L	GF	GA	GD	Pts	Promotion, qualification or relegation
1	South Shields	15	10	2	3	30	20	+10	32	Promotion to National League
2	Hereford	16	9	3	4	28	14	+14	30	Qualification for the National League North play-off semi-finals
3	Macclesfield	14	9	3	2	24	12	+12	30	Qualification for the National League North play-off semi-finals
4	Chester	16	9	2	5	23	14	+9	29	Qualification for the National League North play-off quarter-finals
5	Oxford City	16	8	4	4	28	15	+13	28	Qualification for the National League North play-off quarter-finals
6	Hednesford Town	16	8	3	5	30	22	+8	27	Qualification for the National League North play-off quarter-finals
7	King's Lynn Town	16	8	3	5	27	21	+6	27	Qualification for the National League North play-off quarter-finals
8	Buxton	16	8	3	5	32	27	+5	27	
9	Morecambe	16	7	3	6	25	20	+5	24	
10	Chorley	16	7	2	7	26	26	0	23	
11	Spalding United	16	6	4	6	20	17	+3	22	
12	Bedford Town	15	7	1	7	18	21	−3	22	
13	AFC Telford United	16	6	4	6	18	22	−4	22	
14	Hebburn Town	16	5	6	5	20	28	−8	21	
15	Worksop Town	15	6	2	7	20	21	−1	20	
16	Marine	15	6	1	8	20	20	0	19	
17	Merthyr Town	16	4	7	5	22	23	−1	19	
18	Brackley Town	16	5	4	7	18	27	−9	19	
19	Harborough Town	14	4	5	5	13	17	−4	17	
20	Scarborough Athletic	16	4	4	8	22	25	−3	16	
21	Radcliffe	15	5	1	9	19	27	−8	16	Relegation to the Northern Premier League/Southern Football League
22	Darlington	16	3	3	10	20	29	−9	12	Relegation to the Northern Premier League/Southern Football League
23	Southport	15	2	4	9	15	30	−15	10	Relegation to the Northern Premier League/Southern Football League
24	Spennymoor Town	16	2	4	10	14	34	−20	10	Relegation to the Northern Premier League/Southern Football League

Updated to match(es) played on 17 November 2026. Source: National League official site
Rules for classification: 1) Points; 2) Goal difference; 3) Number of goals scored; 4) Number of matches won; 5) Head-to-head results

=== Results ===
Home \ Away	TEL	BED	BRA	BUX	CHE	CHO	DAR	HAR	HEB	HED	HER	KLT	MAC	MAR	MER	MOR	OXF	RAD	SCA	SSH	SPT	SPA	SPE	WRK
AFC Telford United	—	0–1	1–2				2–1		2–2	1–1		0–5					1–0					2–1		
Bedford Town		—		2–1		1–2	2–3			1–0	1–1		0–3					1–0					3–1	
Brackley Town			—		0–1			1–0	1–1			0–2						0–1	1–1	3–2			2–1	
Buxton			5–0	—	3–1			3–0	1–2		2–1			4–2	2–1									2–2
Chester		1–0			—					0–1		2–0		2–1	0–1	0–1						1–0		4–1
Chorley	2–1		2–2	2–3	1–2	—	5–2				1–2								2–1			2–1		
Darlington					0–1		—		1–1			0–2	1–2		1–1		1–1						3–0	1–2
Harborough Town	0–0						4–2	—			0–3			2–1		1–0					1–0			1–1
Hebburn Town					1–1			1–1	—	2–1		4–2					0–3		0–2		3–1			1–0
Hednesford Town			3–2					2–1		—						6–2		4–1	3–4	0–1	2–2	2–0		
Hereford	0–1				1–1					0–1	—	0–3		1–0				3–0		6–0			2–1	
King's Lynn Town				1–0		2–0		1–1		2–3		—		1–4					3–1		0–0		2–0	
Macclesfield			2–1					1–0	3–0		1–2		—					2–1	0–0	4–3				
Marine						0–2	2–1						0–1	—			1–1	2–0				1–0		0–1
Merthyr Town	2–2					1–1			4–1	2–0		1–1	2–1	1–2	—	1–3								
Morecambe	2–1		3–0	4–0			1–0				2–2					—			2–0	0–1			1–1	
Oxford City		1–0		2–3		4–0		1–1					1–3		3–0	1–1	—			1–3				
Radcliffe						0–3	0–1		5–1						3–3	2–1	0–3	—	4–1			0–2		
Scarborough Athletic	0–1	1–2		2–2										1–3	0–0				—	0–1	5–1		3–0	
South Shields				4–0	3–1	2–1								2–1	1–1					—	5–1	1–1		
Southport	1–2	4–1		1–1							0–1					2–1		0–2			—		2–2	
Spalding United		2–1	2–2				3–2		0–0				0–0				0–1				2–0	—		3–1
Spennymoor Town					0–5	2–0				1–1			1–1		2–1		1–4			0–1		1–3	—	
Worksop Town	2–1	1–2	0–1								0–3	5–0				2–1	0–1				2–0			—

Updated to match(es) played on 17 November 2026. Source: National League North Results Grid
Legend: Blue = home team win; Yellow = draw; Red = away team win.
For upcoming matches, an "a" indicates there is an article about the rivalry between the two participants.

=== Season statistics ===
As of 21 November 2026

=== Top scorers ===
Rank	Player	Club	Goals
1	(South Africa) Sisa Tuntulwana	Buxton	12
2	(Poland) Bartosz Cybulski	Spalding United	11
3	(England) Rio Allan	Scarborough Athletic	10
4	(England) Paul Blackett	South Shields	9
4	(England) Harrison Iwunze	Hereford	9
4	(England) Tyrone Marsh	Oxford City	9
4	(Wales) Cedwyn Scott	South Shields	9
8	(England) Jamie Cooke	Hednesford Town	8
8	(England) Danny Elliott	Macclesfield	8

=== Monthly awards ===
Each month the Enterprise National League announces their official Player of the Month and Manager of the Month.

Month	Manager of the Month		Player of the Month		Reference
August	(England) John Rooney	Macclesfield	(England) Rio Allan	Scarborough Athletic	
September	(Australia) Aaron Downes	Hereford	(Poland) Bartosz Cybulski	Spalding United	
October	(England) Kelvin Davis	Hednesford Town	(England) Toby Onanaye	South Shields	

== National League South ==
National League South
- Season: 2026–27

The National League South also consists of 24 teams.

=== Team changes ===
To National League South

Relegated from the National League

- Braintree Town
- Truro City

Promoted from the Isthmian League Premier Division

- Folkestone Invicta
- Billericay Town

Promoted from the Southern League Premier Division South

- Walton & Hersham
- Farnham Town

From National League South

Promoted to the National League

- Worthing
- Hornchurch

Relegated to the Isthmian League Premier Division

- Enfield Town
- Eastbourne Borough

Relegated to the Southern League Premier Division South

- Chippenham Town
- Bath City

=== Stadiums and locations ===
Locations of the National League South 2026–27 teams (Greater London shown in more detail below)
Locations of the National League South 2026–27 teams (Greater London clubs)
Locations of the National League South 2026–27 teams (Surrey clubs)
Locations of the National League South 2026–27 teams (Southeast)

Locations of the National League South 2026–27 teams (Southwest)

Team	Location	Stadium	Capacity
AFC Totton	Totton	Testwood Stadium	3,000
Billericay Town	Billericay	New Lodge	3,500
Braintree Town	Braintree	Cressing Road	4,222
Chelmsford City	Chelmsford	Melbourne Stadium	3,502
Chesham United	Chesham	The Meadow	5,000
Dagenham & Redbridge	London (Dagenham)	Victoria Road	6,078
Dorking Wanderers	Dorking	Meadowbank Stadium	4,250
Dover Athletic	Dover	Crabble Athletic Ground	6,500
Ebbsfleet United	Northfleet	Stonebridge Road	4,800
Farnborough	Farnborough	Cherrywood Road	7,000
Farnham Town	Farnham	The Memorial Ground	2,200
Folkestone Invicta	Folkestone	Cheriton Road	4,000
Hampton & Richmond Borough	London (Hampton)	Beveree Stadium	3,500
Hemel Hempstead Town	Hemel Hempstead	Vauxhall Road	3,152
Horsham	Horsham	Hop Oast Stadium	3,000
Maidenhead United	Maidenhead	York Road	4,000
Maidstone United	Maidstone	Gallagher Stadium	4,200
Salisbury	Salisbury	Raymond McEnhill Stadium	5,000
Slough Town	Slough	Arbour Park	3,000
Tonbridge Angels	Tonbridge	Longmead Stadium	3,000
Torquay United	Torquay	Plainmoor	6,500
Truro City	Truro	Truro City Stadium	3,600
Walton & Hersham	Walton-on-Thames	Elmbridge Sports Hub	2,097
Weston-super-Mare	Weston-super-Mare	Woodspring Stadium	3,500

=== Managerial changes ===
Team	Outgoing manager	Manner of departure	Date of vacancy	Position in table	Incoming manager	Date of appointment
Dagenham & Redbridge	(England) Andy Carroll	End of caretaker spell	25 April 2026	Pre-season	(England) Lee Allinson	3 May 2026
Maidstone United	(Cameroon) George Elokobi	End of contract	25 April 2026	Pre-season	(England) Craig Fagan	25 April 2026
Slough Town	(Republic of Ireland) Scott Davies	Signed by Aldershot Town	27 April 2026	Pre-season	(Northern Ireland) Alan Julian	4 May 2026
Hemel Hempstead Town	(England) Lee Allinson	Signed by Dagenham & Redbridge	3 May 2026	Pre-season	(England) Lee Bircham	3 May 2026
Chelmsford City	(England) Ricky Holmes	End of caretaker spell	10 May 2026	Pre-season	(England) Mark Cooper	11 May 2026
Walton & Hersham	(Poland) Jakub Pietrzak	Mutual consent	17 May 2026	Pre-season	(England) Kevin James	1 June 2026
Walton & Hersham	(England) Kevin James	Sacked	31 August 2026	24th	(Portugal) Rúben Gaspar (Note: Gaspar took interim charge alongside Wayne Andrews on 4 September 2026 before being appointed permanently on 23 September 2026. Andrews subsequently returned to his coaching duties.)	23 September 2026
Slough Town	(Northern Ireland) Alan Julian	Sacked	6 September 2026	23rd	(England) John Goddard, (England) Ryan Case & (Kenya) Henry Ochieng (interims)	6 September 2026
Hampton & Richmond Borough	(England) Alan Dowson	Mutual consent	12 October 2026	22nd	(England) Craig Saunders & (England) Max Kretzschmar (interims)	13 October 2026
Slough Town	(England) John Goddard, (England) Ryan Case & (Kenya) Henry Ochieng	End of interim spell	21 October 2026	24th	(England) Steve McKimm	21 October 2026
Hampton & Richmond Borough	(England) Craig Saunders & (England) Max Kretzschmar	End of interim spell	10 November 2026	22nd	(England) Richard Thomas	10 November 2026

=== League table ===
Pos	Team	Pld	W	D	L	GF	GA	GD	Pts	Promotion, qualification or relegation
1	Ebbsfleet United	16	10	5	1	38	12	+26	35	Promotion to National League
2	Maidstone United	16	10	2	4	28	19	+9	32	Qualification for the National League South play-off semi-finals
3	Salisbury	15	9	4	2	27	10	+17	31	Qualification for the National League South play-off semi-finals
4	Truro City	15	9	4	2	27	12	+15	31	Qualification for the National League South play-off quarter-finals
5	Farnham Town	16	9	2	5	32	20	+12	29	Qualification for the National League South play-off quarter-finals
6	Billericay Town	15	7	6	2	34	18	+16	27	Qualification for the National League South play-off quarter-finals
7	Dorking Wanderers	15	7	6	2	34	23	+11	27	Qualification for the National League South play-off quarter-finals
8	Tonbridge Angels	17	8	3	6	30	19	+11	27	
9	Chelmsford City	16	5	10	1	25	17	+8	25	
10	Dagenham & Redbridge	16	7	4	5	15	13	+2	25	
11	Torquay United	15	6	5	4	24	17	+7	23	
12	Horsham	16	5	7	4	23	19	+4	22	
13	Dover Athletic	14	6	4	4	20	19	+1	22	
14	Weston-super-Mare	15	6	3	6	25	22	+3	21	
15	Folkestone Invicta	15	5	5	5	22	18	+4	20	
16	AFC Totton	16	6	1	9	17	29	−12	19	
17	Farnborough	16	5	2	9	13	33	−20	17	
18	Maidenhead United	16	3	7	6	15	20	−5	16	
19	Braintree Town	16	5	1	10	22	40	−18	16	
20	Hemel Hempstead Town	17	3	6	8	15	26	−11	15	
21	Chesham United	16	3	2	11	20	35	−15	11	Relegation to the Southern Football League/Isthmian League
22	Hampton & Richmond Borough	16	2	4	10	19	37	−18	10	Relegation to the Southern Football League/Isthmian League
23	Walton & Hersham	15	2	2	11	11	36	−25	8	Relegation to the Southern Football League/Isthmian League
24	Slough Town	16	2	1	13	18	40	−22	7	Relegation to the Southern Football League/Isthmian League

Updated to match(es) played on 17 November 2026. Source: National League official site
Rules for classification: 1) Points; 2) Goal difference; 3) Number of goals scored; 4) Number of matches won; 5) Head-to-head results

=== Results ===
Home \ Away	TOT	BIL	BRA	CHL	CHS	D&R	DOR	DOV	EBB	FAB	FHM	FOL	HRB	HHT	HOR	MHD	MST	SAL	SLO	TON	TRQ	TRU	W&H	WSM
AFC Totton	—	1–0		1–3	0–4		0–3						4–1						0–1		1–0		0–1	
Billericay Town		—	3–2				3–3	2–0		4–0			2–2	5–0						2–2	3–0			
Braintree Town			—		3–2	2–1				0–2			1–0		1–2		2–1			0–4		1–2	1–3	
Chelmsford City				—					2–2	2–1	0–2				0–0	1–0		1–1		3–3		0–0		
Chesham United		1–2		0–5	—			2–2			2–4	2–2				0–4							2–0	
Dagenham & Redbridge		2–2			2–0	—		0–1			2–1		1–0	0–0					1–0		2–0			
Dorking Wanderers			4–3	3–3		0–1	—						3–2	3–3			2–3					1–0		2–0
Dover Athletic	2–0		3–3	0–1			1–1	—			1–0					0–3			5–3	0–1				
Ebbsfleet United	5–0				1–0				—			1–0		0–0	2–2	4–0		1–1						6–1
Farnborough					1–0	2–0		0–1	0–6	—				0–2	0–5					0–4				2–1
Farnham Town	0–1	2–4	6–0								—							1–2		3–1	2–0	2–2		3–2
Folkestone Invicta	2–1			1–1						2–0	1–2	—		2–0	1–1								5–1	
Hampton & Richmond Borough				1–1					0–2	2–0			—			1–1	1–4		5–3			3–4		
Hemel Hempstead Town	1–3			1–1							1–1			—		0–1	1–2			1–1	0–2			1–3
Horsham	2–3				1–4	1–1					1–2		2–0		—		1–2	0–0					1–0	
Maidenhead United	1–1	2–2				0–0	0–0			1–1					1–1	—				0–1	0–4			
Maidstone United									1–3	1–2		1–1				2–1	—	2–1	2–1			1–2		1–0
Salisbury		1–0	2–0					1–1				2–0	5–0	1–2				—	5–1					
Slough Town			1–2				1–3		1–1		0–1	0–2		0–2	1–2				—				3–1	
Tonbridge Angels					2–0				1–2			2–0		1–0			0–1	1–2		—	1–2	0–2	5–1	
Torquay United							2–2					3–2	1–1		1–1		1–1		5–1		—			0–0
Truro City		0–0			3–1	3–0			3–0							2–0		0–1	3–1			—	1–1	
Walton & Hersham						0–2	1–4		0–2	2–2							0–3	0–2			0–3		—	
Weston-super-Mare	3–1		4–1	1–1	3–0	1–0		2–3				1–1	3–0											—

Updated to match(es) played on 17 November 2026. Source: National League South Results Grid
Legend: Blue = home team win; Yellow = draw; Red = away team win.
For upcoming matches, an "a" indicates there is an article about the rivalry between the two participants.

=== Season statistics ===
As of 21 November 2026

=== Top goalscorers ===
Rank	Player	Club	Goals
1	(England) Tyler Harvey	Truro City	11
2	(England) George Alexander	Chelmsford City; Farnham Town	10
2	(England) Nathan Odokonyero	Salisbury	10
2	(Poland) Dawid Rogalski	Dorking Wanderers	10
5	(England) Frank Baker	Tonbridge Angels	7
5	(England) Jack Barham	Chelmsford City	7
5	(England) Finlay Barnes	Ebbsfleet United	7
5	(England) Jo Benton	Billericay Town	7
5	(Zimbabwe) Macauley Bonne	Billericay Town	7
5	(England) Alfie Rutherford	Dorking Wanderers	7

=== Monthly awards ===
Each month the Enterprise National League announces their official Player of the Month and Manager of the Month.

Month	Manager of the Month		Player of the Month		Reference
August	(England) Craig Fagan	Maidstone United	(England) Jephte Tanga	Tonbridge Angels	
September	(England) Danny Scopes	Billericay Town	(England) Jon Benton	Billericay Town	
October	(England) Josh Wright	Ebbsfleet United	(England) Tyler Harvey	Truro City	

== See also ==
- 2026–27 Premier League
- 2026–27 EFL Championship
- 2026–27 EFL League One
- 2026–27 EFL League Two
- 2026–27 EFL Cup
- 2026–27 FA Cup
- 2026–27 EFL Trophy
- 2026–27 Isthmian League Premier
- 2026–27 Northern Premier League Premier
- 2026–27 Southern League Premier Central
- 2026–27 Southern League Premier South
