= Sporting Club Inkberrow F.C. =

Coordinates: 52°13′11″N 1°58′52″W

Sporting Club Inkberrow
- Full name: Sporting Club Inkberrow
- Nickname: The Eagles
- Founded: 1978; 48 years ago
- Stadium: Sands Road
- Chairman: Neil Guy
- Manager: Umit Eminoglu, Neil Guy
- League: Southern League Division One South
- 2025–26: Southern League Division One South, 11th of 22
Home colours	Away colours

Sporting Club Inkberrow Football Club (SC Inkberrow FC) is a football club based in Inkberrow, Worcestershire, England. They are currently members of the Southern League Division One South and play at Sands Road, Inkberrow. The Football Club forms part of the wider Inkberrow Football Club, and the Sporting Club Inkberrow charity.

== History ==
Inkberrow FC was formed in 1978, initially providing senior men's football and playing from the Inkberrow playing fields. In 2016, the club entered the Stratford Alliance League as Inkberrow Colts. In 2019, the club joined the Midland League but were required to register as a separate club to the wider Inkberrow FC, due to an Inkberrow team already competing in the league setup. The club chose to adopt the name of the wider charity the club is associated to, and adopted the original playing colours of the founding team of 1978. After a season in the system and winning Division Four of the Midland Football League, the club joined the Hellenic League Division Two West in 2020 where they again won the league at their first attempt. In 2021, Sporting Club Inkberrow joined the Herefordshire Football League, winning the Premier Division at the end of the season. The league title was clinched in style as Inkberrow finished the season strongly, with six wins from seven games, to overtake title challengers Ledbury Town, who dropped points at the end of the season following a 3-3 draw with Welland, where goalkeeper Daniel Hughes scored in extra time to secure a point for his team.

In 2023, the club was admitted into the Hellenic League Division One, marking the first time an Inkberrow team became part of the football pyramid, entering at step 6. In their first season at this level, Inkberrow reached the play-off final after beating Clanfield 3-0 in the semi-final by overcoming an early red card to J. Padden, with goals coming from J. Higgins-Pugsley, T. Emblem (penalty won by R. Guy), and L. Brown. But in the final Inkberrow lost to play-off winners Malmesbury Victoria 2-1 in front of a crowd of 504, with their goal coming from C. Stanley. Despite this, Inkberrow were still promoted to the Hellenic Premier division for the 24/25 season on request from the league, entering step 5 football for the first time in their history, and one of only two teams to achieve back to back promotions from step 7 to step 5 in the 23/24 season.

Inkberrow continued their ascent through the non-league pyramid by achieving promotion in their first ever year at step 5, winning the Hellenic Premier Division play-offs. After finishing 3rd in the league on 78 points, Inkberrow earned a home semi-final tie against Mangotsfield and came out 3 - 0 winners thanks to goals from G. Guy, W. Skelton and Z. McKenzie. Following their victory against Roman Glass St. George, it was Highworth who would make the trip to Sands Lane to play Inkberrow in the final. The game ended 1 - 0 to the hosts, with J. Tolley latching onto a L. Crook through ball to claim the decisive goal and sealing Inkberrow's third successive promotion.

== Ground ==
The club currently play at Sands Road in Inkberrow, where Sir Bobby Robson officially launched the clubs new facilities in 2008^{[5]}. The site at Sands Road consists of a large pavilion with bar, café and changing facilities, four full-size football pitches, two junior pitches, 4G training facility, grass training areas, and also two cricket squares with the facilities being mixed use with Inkberrow Cricket Club. The new 4G training facility was officially opened in 2025 by local MP Chris Bloore, allowing the club to extend its offering to the local community, supporting a range of ages, genders and diabilities at the club.

== Records ==
- Best FA Cup performance: Preliminary round, 2025–26
- Best FA Trophy performance: Third qualifying round, 2025–26
- Best FA Vase performance: Second qualifying round, 2024–25

== Playing kit ==
Upon the incorporation of the men’s Inkberrow FC and junior Inkberrow Eagles section in 2005 and with the former having played in yellow and blue in the years prior, the club adopted kit colours inspired by the Brazil national football team of yellow shirts with green trim and blue shorts. This reflected the club’s development strategy which emphasised fun and enjoyment, a style of play that promoted a high level of technical skill and a competitive spirit and will to win as a team. Colours broadly returned to plain yellow and blue in the 2010s, but as part of the requirement from the FA in 2019 to officially register two separate clubs, the newly formed Sporting Club Inkberrow FC adopted the colours of the original founding team from 1978. The current primary sponsor for both the home and away kits is supported by Heddleworth Amusements, who have supported the club since inception.
