= Hartpury F.C. =

Coordinates: 51°54′27″N 2°18′19″W

Hartpury
- Full name: Hartpury Football Club
- Founded: 2020; 6 years ago
- Ground: Hartpury University Stadium, Hartpury
- Capacity: 2,000
- Manager: Dr Martin Longworth
- League: Southern League Division One South
- 2025–26: Southern League Division One South, 7th of 22
Home colours

Hartpury Football Club is a football club based in Hartpury in Gloucestershire, England, and is the football team of Hartpury College. They are currently members of the Southern League Division One South and play at Hartpury College.

== History ==
In 2020, Hartpury College formed and entered Hartpury University into the Hellenic League Division Two North. In 2022, following a successful season in the Herefordshire FA County League, the club was admitted into the Hellenic League Division One. Having finished second in their first year at the level, losing the play-off final on penalties, the 2023–24 season saw the club promoted as champions. The following season saw the club achieve a second consecutive promotion as Premier Division champions, also reaching the semi-final of the FA Vase. They were renamed Hartpury in the summer, dropping the educational suffix from their name.

== Ground ==
The club currently play at the Hartpury University Stadium. They share the pitch with Hartpury RFC.

== Honours ==
- Hellenic Football League
  - Premier Division champions: 2024–25
  - Division One champions: 2023–24
- Herefordshire County League
  - Premier champions: 2021-22
  - County Cup champions: 2021-22
  - Senior Cup champions: 2022

== Records ==
- Best league performance: 1st in Hellenic League Premier Division, 2024–25
- Best FA Cup performance: First qualifying Round, 2024–25
- Best FA Trophy performance: Third qualifying Round, 2025–26
- Best FA Vase performance: Semi-finalists, 2024–25
