= Biggleswade F.C. =

Association football club in England

Coordinates: 52°07′44″N 0°24′50″W

Biggleswade
- Full name: Biggleswade Football Club
- Nickname: FC
- Founded: 2016
- Ground: The Eyrie, Cardington
- Capacity: 3,000 (300 seated)
- Chairman: Jeremy Reynolds
- Manager: Dave Northfield and Mark Inskip
- League: Southern League Division One Central
- 2024–25: Southern League Division One Central, 8th of 21
- Website: biggleswadefc.co.uk

Biggleswade Football Club is a football club based in Biggleswade, Bedfordshire, England. The club are currently members of the Southern League Division One Central and groundshare at Bedford Town's Eyrie ground in Cardington

== History ==
The club was established in 2016, based on Biggleswade Town's under-18 side. They applied to join the Spartan South Midlands League for the 2016–17 season and after successfully appealing against an initial rejection, were placed in Division One. They won the division at the first attempt, earning promotion to the Premier Division. In 2018–19 the club won the Premier Division and Premier Division Cup double, and were promoted to Division One Central of the Southern League. They were runners-up in Division One Central in 2022–23, qualifying for the promotion play-offs; however, the club were beaten 4–1 by Ware in the semi-finals. In 2023–24 the club won the Bedfordshire Senior Cup, beating AFC Dunstable 1–0 in the final.

== Ground ==
The club played at Biggleswade Town's Langford Road ground until the curtailment of the 2020–21 season. In February 2021 they announced that they would groundshare with Bedford Town for the 2021–22 season. A record attendance of 670 was set for a 'home' game against Bedford on 27 December 2021, which was broken three years later when 1,180 attended an FA Cup fourth qualifying round match against York City.

== Honours ==
- Spartan South Midlands League
  - Premier Division champions 2018–19
  - Division One champions: 2016–17
  - Premier Division Cup winners 2018–19
- Bedfordshire Senior Cup
  - Winners 2023–24
- North Beds Charity Cup
  - Winners 2018–19

== Records ==
- Best FA Cup performance: Fourth qualifying round, 2024–25
- Best FA Trophy performance: Third qualifying round, 2023–24, 2025–26
- Best FA Vase performance: Quarter-finals, 2018–19
- Record attendance: 1,180 vs York City, FA Cup fourth qualifying round, 12 October 2024
