= 1980–81 Combined Counties Football League =

The 1980–81 Combined Counties Football League season was the third in the history of the Combined Counties Football League, a football competition in England.

The league was won by Malden Town for the first time.

== League table ==
Combined Counties Football League
- Season: 1980–81
- Champions: Malden Town
- Matches: 342
- Goals: 1,232 (3.6 per match)

The league was expanded from 15 to 19 clubs as four new clubs joined:

- Cranleigh
- Farnham Town, joining from the London Spartan League Premier Division.
- Lingfield
- Wrecclesham
- Godalming & Farncombe United were renamed Godalming Town.

Pos	Team	Pld	W	D	L	GF	GA	GD	Pts	Promotion or relegation
1	Malden Town	36	23	9	4	85	41	+44	55	Placed to Eastern Division
2	Hartley Wintney	36	23	9	4	64	34	+30	55	Placed to Western Division
3	Westfield	36	24	6	6	91	46	+45	54	Placed to Eastern Division
4	Farnham Town	36	22	9	5	78	43	+35	53	Placed to Western Division
5	Chessington United	36	24	4	8	93	47	+46	52	Placed to Eastern Division
6	Ash United	36	22	7	7	100	44	+56	51	Placed to Western Division
7	Guildford & Worplesdon	36	21	8	7	88	42	+46	50	Placed to Western Division
8	Lion Sports	36	13	13	10	70	52	+18	39	Left at the end of the season
9	British Aerospace (Weybridge)	36	17	4	15	88	61	+27	38	Placed to Eastern Division
10	Godalming Town	36	13	6	17	48	69	−21	32	Placed to Eastern Division
11	Cobham	36	10	10	16	55	64	−9	30	Placed to Eastern Division
12	Virginia Water	36	11	5	20	55	75	−20	27	Placed to Eastern Division
13	Wrecclesham	36	9	9	18	59	81	−22	27	Placed to Western Division
14	Cranleigh	36	9	9	18	56	83	−27	27	Placed to Eastern Division
15	Sheerwater	36	7	12	17	48	80	−32	26	Placed to Eastern Division
16	Lingfield	36	8	9	19	45	66	−21	25	Placed to Eastern Division
17	Yateley Town	36	9	6	21	49	87	−38	24	Placed to Western Division
18	Lightwater	36	3	4	29	30	99	−69	10	Placed to Western Division
19	Clarion	36	2	5	29	30	118	−88	9	Placed to Eastern Division

Rules for classification: The system of using goal difference to separate two teams tied on points was used.
