= 2015–16 FA Cup qualifying rounds =

Tournament details
- Country: England; Guernsey; Wales

The 2015–16 FA Cup qualifying rounds opened the 135th season of competition in England for The Football Association Challenge Cup (FA Cup), the world's oldest association football single knockout competition. A total of 736 clubs were accepted for the competition, the same as the previous season.

The large number of clubs entering the tournament from lower down (Levels 5 to 10) in the English football pyramid meant that the competition started with six rounds of preliminary (2) and qualifying (4) knockouts for these non-League teams. The 32 winning teams from the fourth qualifying round progressed to the First round proper, where League teams tiered at Levels 3 and 4 entered the competition.

== Calendar and prizes ==
The calendar for the 2015–16 FA Cup qualifying rounds, as announced by The Football Association.

Round	Main date	Leagues entering at this round	New entries this round	Winners from previous round	Number of fixtures	Prize money
Extra preliminary round	15 August 2015	Levels 9-10	368	none	184	£1,500
Preliminary round	29 August 2015	Level 8	136	184	160	£1,925
First qualifying round	12 September 2015	Level 7	72	160	116	£3,000
Second qualifying round	26 September 2015	National League North; National League South	44	116	80	£4,500
Third qualifying round	10 October 2015	none	none	80	40	£7,500
Fourth qualifying round	24 October 2015	National League	24	40	32	£12,500
For the next rounds look 2015–16 FA Cup

== Extra preliminary round ==
Extra preliminary round fixtures were due to be played on 15 August 2015, with replays taking place no later than 20 August 2015. A total of 368 teams, from Level 9 and Level 10 of English football, entered at this stage of the competition. The round includes 91 teams from Level 10 of English football, being the lowest ranked clubs to compete in the tournament.

Tie	Home team (tier)	Score	Away team (tier)	Att.
1	Penrith (9)	1–3	Jarrow Roofing BCA (9)	110
2	Silsden (9)	2–1	West Allotment Celtic (9)	53
3	Ashington (9)	2–2	Albion Sports (9)	310
replay	Albion Sports (9)	2–3	Ashington (9)	121
4	AFC Darwen (9)	1–2	Washington (9)	203
5	Newcastle Benfield (9)	4–2	Yorkshire Amateur (10)	80
6	Nelson (9)	0–4	Newton Aycliffe (9)	96
7	Bedlington Terriers (9)	1–1	West Auckland Town (9)	
replay	West Auckland Town (9)	4–0	Bedlington Terriers (9)	
8	Barnoldswick Town (9)	0–5	Colne (9)	333
9	Billingham Synthonia (10)	0–0	Consett (9)	147
replay	Consett (9)	8–0	Billingham Synthonia (10)	188
10	Hebburn Town (10)	1–3	Tadcaster Albion (9)	83
11	Bishop Auckland (9)	1–1	Shildon (9)	529
replay	Shildon (9)	2–4	Bishop Auckland (9)	
12	Sunderland RCA (9)	4–4	Guisborough Town (9)	65
replay	Guisborough Town (9)	3–2	Sunderland RCA (9)	
13	Crook Town (10)	0–6	Dunston UTS (9)	118
14	Holker Old Boys (10)	4–0	Liversedge (9)	89
15	Pickering Town (9)	4–0	Thornaby (10)	159
16	Seaham Red Star (9)	2–2	Marske United (9)	
replay	Marske United (9)	3–1	Seaham Red Star (9)	104
17	Garforth Town (9)	1–4	Morpeth Town (9)	121
18	Heaton Stannington (10)	3–1	Norton & Stockton Ancients (9)	
19	Bridlington Town (9)	0–2	North Shields (9)	351
20	Whitley Bay (9)	1–1	Ryhope Colliery Welfare (10)	287
replay	Ryhope Colliery Welfare (10)	2–3	Whitley Bay (9)	127
21	Whickham (10)	1–2	Padiham (9)	130
22	Durham City (9)	1–3	Thackley (9)	108
23	Glasshoughton Welfare (10)	2–2	Runcorn Linnets (9)	163
replay	Runcorn Linnets (9)	6–1	Glasshoughton Welfare (10)	274
24	Chadderton (10)	2–9	AFC Liverpool (9)	75
25	Congleton Town (9)	0–0	Nostell Miners Welfare (9)	163
replay	Nostell Miners Welfare (9)	0–4	Congleton Town (9)	56
26	Alsager Town (9)	1–0	Athersley Recreation (9)	110
27	Winsford United (9)	1–1	AFC Blackpool (9)	134
replay	AFC Blackpool (9)	3–2	Winsford United (9)	43
28	AFC Emley (10)	7–1	Parkgate (9)	249
29	Ashton Athletic (9)	2–2	Maltby Main (9)	73
replay	Maltby Main (9)	3–2	Ashton Athletic (9)	115
30	Penistone Church (10)	0–2	Pontefract Collieries (9)	220
31	Maine Road (9)	2–1	St Helens Town (10)	103
32	Handsworth Parramore (9)	6–0	Staveley Miners Welfare (9)	122
33	1874 Northwich (9)	3–0	West Didsbury & Chorlton (9)	350
34	Barton Town Old Boys (9)	2–2	Squires Gate (9)	122
replay	Squires Gate (9)	2–4 (a.e.t.)	Barton Town Old Boys (9)	36
35	Abbey Hey (9)	3–1	Worksop Town (9)	180
36	Runcorn Town (9)	3–0	Bacup Borough (10)	65
37	Hemsworth Miners Welfare (10)	1–2	Armthorpe Welfare (9)	68
38	Bootle (9)	0–2	Atherton Collieries (9)	195
39	Hanley Town (10)	4–2	Shawbury United (10)	118
40	Continental Star (9)	2–2	Bolehall Swifts (10)	69
replay	Bolehall Swifts (10)	1–3	Continental Star (9)	48
41	Boldmere St Michaels (9)	3–3	Rocester (9)	123
replay	Rocester (9)	4–0	Boldmere St Michaels (9)	68
42	Hinckley (10)	0–0	Walsall Wood (9)	241
replay	Walsall Wood (9)	1–3	Hinckley (10)	171
43	Brocton (9)	1–5	Stourport Swifts (9)	92
44	Southam United (10)	0–2	AFC Wulfrunians (9)	68
45	Alvechurch (9)	2–0	Heath Hayes (10)	88
46	Tipton Town (10)	0–2	Cadbury Athletic (10)	
47	AFC Bridgnorth (10)	1–0	Wolverhampton Casuals (10)	
48	Malvern Town (10)	0–5	Sporting Khalsa (9)	108
49	Westfields (9)	1–0	Pegasus Juniors (10)	247
50	Gornal Athletic (10)	1–2	Bromsgrove Sporting (10)	128
51	Lye Town (9)	2–2	Coventry Sphinx (9)	80
replay	Coventry Sphinx (9)	2–1 (a.e.t.)	Lye Town (9)	90
52	Coleshill Town (9)	11–0	Ellesmere Rangers (10)	121
53	Cleethorpes Town (9)	5–1	Brigg Town (9)	116
54	Harborough Town (9)	3–2	Shirebrook Town (10)	81
55	South Normanton Athletic (10)	2–1	AFC Mansfield (10)	95
56	Shepshed Dynamo (9)	1–0	Retford United (9)	185
57	Bottesford Town (10)	2–2	Rainworth Miners Welfare (9)	63
replay	Rainworth Miners Welfare (9)	1–5	Bottesford Town (10)	62
58	Kirby Muxloe (9)	3–1	Heanor Town (9)	
59	Long Eaton United (9)	2–1	Harrowby United (9)	111
60	Loughborough University (9)	4–1	Barrow Town (10)	74
61	St Andrews (10)	2–3	Clipstone (9)	32
62	Radford (10)	3–2	Sleaford Town (9)	105
63	Quorn (9)	1–3	Oadby Town (9)	161
64	Bardon Hill (9)	0–1	Dunkirk (9)	61
65	Ellistown & Ibstock United (10)	0–5	Holwell Sports (10)	54
66	Blaby & Whetstone Athletic (10)	0–5	Leicester Nirvana (9)	68
67	Walsham Le Willows (9)	0–3	Godmanchester Rovers (9)	107
68	Wisbech Town (9)	1–0	Diss Town (10)	226
69	Yaxley (9)	2–1	Gorleston (9)	61
70	Peterborough Northern Star (9)	1–2	Newmarket Town (9)	48
71	Haverhill Rovers (9)	0–1	Mildenhall Town (9)	152
72	Fakenham Town (9)	0–0	Huntingdon Town (9)	92
replay	Huntingdon Town (9)	0–6	Fakenham Town (9)	67
73	Eynesbury Rovers (9)	0–1	Peterborough Sports (10)	110
74	Swaffham Town (9)	2–4	Thetford Town (9)	109
75	Great Yarmouth Town (10)	0–3	Norwich United (9)	143
76	Deeping Rangers (9)	6–1	Boston Town (9)	110
77	Holbeach United (9)	1–1	Ely City (10)	137
replay	Ely City (10)	0–4	Holbeach United (9)	108
78	Welwyn Garden City (9)	3–1	Haverhill Borough (10)	96
79	Hoddesdon Town (9)	4–0	Sawbridgeworth Town (9)	216
80	FC Romania (9)	0–3	Whitton United (9)	34
81	Southend Manor (9)	3–1	Codicote (10)	60
82	Wivenhoe Town (10)	1–5	Tower Hamlets (9)	99
83	Cockfosters (9)	4–0	Burnham Ramblers (9)	88
84	Hadley (9)	1–2	Saffron Walden Town (9)	70
85	Hertford Town (9)	2–2	Kirkley & Pakefield (9)	111
replay	Kirkley & Pakefield (9)	2–1	Hertford Town (9)	78
86	Debenham LC (10)	0–1	Ipswich Wanderers (9)	80
87	Bowers & Pitsea (9)	0–1	Ilford (9)	66
88	Basildon United (9)	3–1	Sporting Bengal United (9)	68
89	FC Broxbourne Borough (9)	1–2	Brantham Athletic (9)	41
90	Long Melford (9)	3–0	London Bari (9)	108

Tie	Home team (tier)	Score	Away team (tier)	Att.
91	Clacton (9)	3–1	Eton Manor (9)	139
92	Hullbridge Sports (9)	2–1	Hadleigh United (9)	56
93	Clapton (9)	1–2	Stanway Rovers (9)	261
94	Stansted (9)	2–1	Takeley (9)	187
95	Enfield 1893 (9)	0–4	London Colney (9)	58
96	Felixstowe & Walton United (9)	1–1	Barking (9)	130
replay	Barking (9)	3–1 (a.e.t.)	Felixstowe & Walton United (9)	95
97	Waltham Forest (9)	0–3	St Margaretsbury (9)	63
98	AFC Hayes (9)	3–2	Flackwell Heath (9)	58
99	Wellingborough Town (9)	1–8	Ashford Town (Middx) (9)	101
100	Berkhamsted (9)	3–2	Hanworth Villa (9)	73
101	Oxhey Jets (9)	0–0	AFC Kempston Rovers (9)	58
replay	AFC Kempston Rovers (9)	3–2	Oxhey Jets (9)	43
102	Spelthorne Sports (9)	2–1	Stotfold (9)	80
103	Windsor (9)	0–1	AFC Dunstable (9)	127
104	Ampthill Town (10)	0–3	Risborough Rangers (10)	140
105	Rothwell Corinthians (9)	1–2	Thrapston Town (10)	109
106	Hillingdon Borough (10)	1–1	Wembley (9)	58
replay	Wembley (9)	2–1	Hillingdon Borough (10)	73
107	Northampton Sileby Rangers (9)	2–1	Sun Postal Sports (9)	72
108	Wellingborough Whitworths (10)	0–3	Northampton Spencer (9)	61
109	Newport Pagnell Town (9)	6–2	Holmer Green (9)	84
110	Biggleswade United (9)	2–1	Desborough Town (9)	98
111	Potton United (10)	0–2	Bedfont Sports (9)	91
112	London Tigers (9)	1–1	Bedfont & Feltham (10)	30
replay	Bedfont & Feltham (10)	2–2 (8–7 p)	London Tigers (9)	
113	Tring Athletic (9)	2–1	Leverstock Green (9)	107
114	Bedford (9)	0–6	Cogenhoe United (9)	57
115	Raunds Town (10)	1–0	Crawley Green (10)	41
116	Harefield United (9)	2–2	Long Buckby (10)	102
replay	Long Buckby (10)	1–0	Harefield United (9)	63
117	Royal Wootton Bassett Town (9)	0–2	Bracknell Town (9)	121
118	Ardley United (9)	1–4	Tuffley Rovers (9)	41
119	Binfield (9)	1–1	Westfield (Surrey) (9)	72
replay	Westfield (Surrey) (9)	0–1	Binfield (9)	120
120	Ascot United (9)	1–2	Kidlington (9)	53
121	Holyport (10)	1–3	Milton United (9)	67
122	Hook Norton (10)	5–0	Frimley Green (10)	45
123	Reading Town (10)	0–5	Chertsey Town (9)	
124	Knaphill (9)	1–3	Highworth Town (9)	86
125	Chinnor (10)	0–2	Hartley Wintney (9)	28
126	Thame United (9)	1–1	Farnham Town (9)	145
replay	Farnham Town (9)	1–1 (4–3 p)	Thame United (9)	
127	Abingdon United (9)	0–3	Brimscombe & Thrupp (9)	117
128	Cheltenham Saracens (10)	1–0	Winterbourne United (9)	25
129	Tadley Calleva (10)	2–3	Guildford City (9)	110
130	Highmoor Ibis (9)	1–2	Thatcham Town (9)	102
131	Badshot Lea (9)	2–1	Camberley Town (9)	91
132	Cove (9)	5–4	Shrivenham (10)	
133	Banstead Athletic (10)	1–1	Rochester United (9)	61
replay	Rochester United (9)	2–1	Banstead Athletic (10)	54
134	Hailsham Town (9)	2–3	Eastbourne United (9)	172
135	Worthing United (9)	0–0	Deal Town (9)	68
replay	Deal Town (9)	7–1	Worthing United (9)	84
136	Arundel (9)	3–1	Raynes Park Vale (9)	98
137	Horsham YMCA (9)	2–0	AFC Croydon Athletic (9)	148
138	Fisher (9)	0–3	Corinthian (9)	74
139	Crawley Down Gatwick (10)	1–3	Chichester City (9)	53
140	Tunbridge Wells (9)	W.O.	Glebe (10)	-
Walkover for Tunbridge Wells as Glebe was not accepted into the competition.
141	Shoreham (9)	8–0	St Francis Rangers (9)	80
142	East Preston (9)	1–2	Littlehampton Town (9)	186
143	Horsham (9)	1–0	Lancing (9)	244
144	Colliers Wood United (9)	0–2	Eastbourne Town (9)	
145	Redhill (9)	1–2	Pagham (9)	
146	Holmesdale (9)	2–0	Mile Oak (10)	60
147	Selsey (10)	1–5	Erith Town (9)	95
148	Croydon (9)	5–1	Sutton Common Rovers (9)	81
149	Sevenoaks Town (9)	1–1	Seven Acre & Sidcup (10)	88
replay	Seven Acre & Sidcup (10)	1–1 (4–2 p)	Sevenoaks Town (9)	124
150	Cray Valley (PM) (9)	5–1	Ashford United (9)	100
151	Chessington & Hook United (9)	1–1	Crowborough Athletic (9)	102
replay	Crowborough Athletic (9)	1–2 (a.e.t.)	Chessington & Hook United (9)	105
152	Bexhill United (10)	3–1	Loxwood (9)	21
153	Ringmer (10)	1–4	Beckenham Town (9)	47
154	Lingfield (10)	0–3	Canterbury City (9)	145
155	Greenwich Borough (9)	1–0	Lordswood (9)	123
156	Epsom Athletic (10)	0–4	Erith & Belvedere (9)	151
157	Horley Town (9)	7–0	Wick & Barnham United (9)	
158	Christchurch (10)	2–1	Cadbury Heath (9)	92
159	Melksham Town (9)	2–2	Cowes Sports (9)	114
replay	Cowes Sports (9)	3–1	Melksham Town (9)	
160	Longwell Green Sports (9)	2–1	Folland Sports (9)	77
161	Andover Town (9)	3–0	Gillingham Town (9)	142
162	Lymington Town (9)	0–3	Bitton (9)	
163	Alresford Town (9)	0–1	Bridport (9)	57
164	Hamworthy United (9)	1–1	Hallen (9)	84
replay	Hallen (9)	0–1	Hamworthy United (9)	69
165	Amesbury Town (10)	1–2	Bemerton Heath Harlequins(9)	
166	Hythe & Dibden (10)	1–4	Moneyfields (9)	
167	Team Solent (9)	3–4	Blackfield & Langley (9)	
168	Bradford Town (9)	2–0	United Services Portsmouth (10)	81
169	Cribbs (9)	0–5	Bristol Manor Farm (9)	88
170	Verwood Town (9)	2–0	Newport (IW) (9)	
171	Almondsbury UWE (10)	3–2	Fawley (9)	42
172	Brockenhurst (9)	2–0	Fareham Town (9)	88
173	Bournemouth (9)	0–3	AFC Portchester (9)	77
174	Sherborne Town (9)	2–0	New Milton Town (10)	68
175	Whitchurch United (9)	1–1	Wincanton Town (10)	62
replay	Wincanton Town (10)	3–1	Whitchurch United (9)	109
176	Horndean (9)	1–3	Sholing (9)	80
177	Buckland Athletic (9)	3–0	Clevedon Town (9)	133
178	Saltash United (10)	0–4	St Austell (10)	128
179	Bishop Sutton (10)	0–6	Street (9)	43
180	Witheridge (10)	2–0	Welton Rovers (9)	77
181	Shepton Mallet (9)	0–2	Plymouth Parkway (10)	128
182	Bodmin Town (10)	3–1	Brislington (9)	88
183	Odd Down (9)	3–1	Ashton & Backwell United (10)	87
184	Barnstaple Town (9)	2–0	Willand Rovers (9)	237

== Preliminary round ==
Preliminary round fixtures were due to be played on 29 August 2015, with replays no later than 4 September. A total of 320 teams took part in this stage of the competition, including the 184 winners from the Extra preliminary round and 136 entering at this stage from the six leagues at Level 8 of English football. The round included 29 teams from Level 10 still in the competition, being the lowest ranked teams in this round.

Tie	Home team (tier)	Score	Away team (tier)	Att.
1	Whitley Bay (9)	2–1	Heaton Stannington (10)	346
2	West Auckland Town (9)	2–3	Washington (9)	98
3	Ashington (9)	1–2	Thackley (9)	236
4	Pickering Town (9)	1–5	Clitheroe (8)	231
5	North Shields (9)	1–1	Kendal Town (8)	356
replay	Kendal Town (8)	2–0	North Shields (9)	201
6	Bishop Auckland (9)	1–2	Jarrow Roofing BCA (9)	272
7	Silsden (9)	0–2	Padiham (9)	107
8	Guisborough Town (9)	4–2	Newcastle Benfield (9)	
9	Marske United (9)	1–1	Lancaster City (8)	216
replay	Lancaster City (8)	1–0	Marske United (9)	187
10	Harrogate Railway Athletic (8)	0–0	Spennymoor Town (8)	172
replay	Spennymoor Town (8)	2–0	Harrogate Railway Athletic (8)	388
11	Holker Old Boys (10)	0–2	Dunston UTS (9)	125
12	Consett (9)	2–0	Scarborough Athletic (8)	334
13	Tadcaster Albion (9)	2–5	Colne (9)	243
14	Newton Aycliffe (9)	2–0	Morpeth Town (9)	
15	Congleton Town (9)	4–3	Handsworth Parramore (9)	143
16	Runcorn Linnets (9)	6–0	Pontefract Collieries (9)	272
17	Armthorpe Welfare (9)	1–0	New Mills (8)	51
18	Runcorn Town (9)	2–3	Northwich Victoria (8)	110
19	Alsager Town (9)	2–1	Shaw Lane Aquaforce (8)	99
20	Ossett Albion (8)	3–0	Maine Road (9)	117
21	Mossley (8)	1–1	Bamber Bridge (8)	169
replay	Bamber Bridge (8)	3–1	Mossley (8)	204
22	Burscough (8)	3–1	AFC Emley (10)	118
23	Barton Town Old Boys (9)	1–2	Droylsden (8)	142
24	1874 Northwich (9)	1–2	Maltby Main (9)	260
25	Abbey Hey (9)	3–2	Warrington Town (8)	152
26	AFC Blackpool (9)	1–0	Ossett Town (8)	100
27	Brighouse Town (8)	1–1	Atherton Collieries (9)	139
replay	Atherton Collieries (9)	1–2	Brighouse Town (8)	220
28	AFC Liverpool (9)	3–2	Radcliffe Borough (8)	213
29	Stocksbridge Park Steels (8)	1–1	Farsley Celtic (8)	109
replay	Farsley Celtic (8)	3–0	Stocksbridge Park Steels (8)	137
30	Glossop North End (8)	2–1	Prescot Cables (8)	327
31	Goole (8)	1–1	Sheffield (8)	143
replay	Sheffield (8)	0–3	Goole (8)	197
32	Trafford (8)	1–2	Witton Albion (8)	259
33	Market Drayton Town (8)	2–0	AFC Bridgnorth (10)	102
34	Bromsgrove Sporting (10)	2–6	Hinckley (10)	386
35	Newcastle Town (8)	4–0	Continental Star (9)	77
36	Leek Town (8)	1–1	Rocester (9)	198
replay	Rocester (9)	1–2	Leek Town (8)	
37	Rugby Town (8)	1–0	Coventry Sphinx (9)	259
38	Coleshill Town (9)	2–1	Stafford Rangers (8)	358
39	Sporting Khalsa (9)	4–0	Cadbury Athletic (10)	73
40	Chasetown (8)	2–0	Evesham United (8)	168
41	Westfields (9)	1–1	Kidsgrove Athletic (8)	118
replay	Kidsgrove Athletic (8)	5–6 (a.e.t.)	Westfields (9)	
42	Stourport Swifts (9)	1–0	Alvechurch (9)	138
43	AFC Wulfrunians (9)	2–0	Romulus (8)	93
44	Tividale (8)	1–0	Hanley Town (10)	87
45	Carlton Town (8)	1–2	Shepshed Dynamo (9)	100
46	Harborough Town (9)	0–2	Oadby Town (9)	179
47	Kirby Muxloe (9)	0–0	Holwell Sports (10)	97
replay	Holwell Sports (10)	1–0	Kirby Muxloe (9)	
48	Loughborough Dynamo (8)	1–3	Basford United (8)	102
49	Radford (10)	1–2	Spalding United (8)	110
50	Dunkirk (9)	4–1	Bottesford Town (10)	49
51	South Normanton Athletic (10)	1–1	Lincoln United (8)	85
replay	Lincoln United (8)	2–1	South Normanton Athletic (10)	136
52	Gresley (8)	2–2	Coalville Town (8)	351
replay	Coalville Town (8)	5–0	Gresley (8)	234
53	Leicester Nirvana (9)	2–4	Belper Town (8)	96
54	Loughborough University (9)	1–2	Long Eaton United (9)	143
55	Clipstone (9)	1–0	Cleethorpes Town (9)	
56	Mildenhall Town (9)	5–2	Soham Town Rangers (8)	182
57	Yaxley (9)	4–1	Godmanchester Rovers (9)	
58	Deeping Rangers (9)	1–0	Dereham Town (8)	140
59	Thetford Town (9)	3–5	Bury Town (8)	276
60	Wroxham (8)	3–2	Fakenham Town (9)	141
61	Wisbech Town (9)	0–1	Holbeach United (9)	287
62	St Ives Town (8)	1–1	Norwich United (9)	216
replay	Norwich United (9)	2–6	St Ives Town (8)	125
63	Newmarket Town (9)	3–5	Peterborough Sports (10)	192
64	London Colney (9)	1–3	Potters Bar Town (8)	100
65	St Margaretsbury (9)	1–5	A.F.C. Hornchurch (8)	91
66	Welwyn Garden City (9)	1–0	Waltham Abbey (8)	203
67	Ilford (9)	0–2	Stanway Rovers (9)	
68	Hullbridge Sports (9)	2–0	Maldon & Tiptree (8)	83
69	Harlow Town (8)	5–1	Southend Manor (9)	230
70	Barkingside (8)	1–2	Ipswich Wanderers (9)	110
71	Barking (9)	0–0	Haringey Borough (8)	62
replay	Haringey Borough (8)	2–1	Barking (9)	
72	A.F.C. Sudbury (8)	4–0	Ware (9)	166
73	Whitton United (9)	0–3	Kirkley & Pakefield (9)	77
74	Hoddesdon Town (9)	0–0	Romford (8)	98
replay	Romford (8)	1–1 (4–5 p)	Hoddesdon Town (9)	121
75	Stansted (9)	0–0	Tilbury (8)	189
replay	Tilbury (8)	3–0	Stansted (9)	
76	Redbridge (8)	1–2	Heybridge Swifts (8)	61
77	Cockfosters (9)	3–3	Tower Hamlets (9)	
replay	Tower Hamlets (9)	1–5	Cockfosters (9)	76
78	Saffron Walden Town (9)	2–0	Cheshunt (8)	263
79	Great Wakering Rovers (8)	0–2	Brantham Athletic (9)	115
80	Basildon United (9)	1–0	Long Melford (9)	50
81	Thurrock (8)	2–2	Royston Town (8)	80
replay	Royston Town (8)	1–3	Thurrock (8)	115

Tie	Home team (tier)	Score	Away team (tier)	Att.
82	Witham Town (8)	1–1	Brightlingsea Regent (8)	117
replay	Brightlingsea Regent (8)	2–3	Witham Town (8)	135
83	Clacton (9)	2–6	Aveley (8)	149
84	Ashford Town (Middx) (9)	1–0	AFC Kempston Rovers (9)	105
85	Long Buckby (10)	2–1	Daventry Town (8)	124
86	Beaconsfield SYCOB (8)	3–0	Raunds Town (10)	143
87	Barton Rovers (8)	3–1	Berkhamsted (9)	120
88	Biggleswade United (9)	5–3	Chalfont St Peter (8)	110
89	Risborough Rangers (10)	0–3	Aylesbury (8)	388
90	Wembley (9)	1–1	North Greenford United (8)	63
replay	North Greenford United (8)	5–1	Wembley (9)	87
91	Northampton Sileby Rangers (9)	0–3	Leighton Town (8)	74
92	Bedfont & Feltham (10)	1–1	AFC Hayes (9)	
replay	AFC Hayes (9)	1–3	Bedfont & Feltham (10)	
93	Newport Pagnell Town (9)	1–1	AFC Dunstable (9)	111
replay	AFC Dunstable (9)	2–1	Newport Pagnell Town (9)	138
94	Bedfont Sports (9)	1–2	Hanwell Town (8)	76
95	Uxbridge (8)	1–0	Northampton Spencer (9)	77
96	Aylesbury United (8)	1–2	Northwood (8)	141
97	Bedford Town (8)	2–1	Thrapston Town (10)	187
98	Cogenhoe United (9)	3–0	Spelthorne Sports (9)	78
99	Tring Athletic (9)	0–2	Arlesey Town (8)	116
100	Kings Langley (8)	0–1	AFC Rushden & Diamonds (8)	205
101	Wantage Town (8)	3–4	Didcot Town (8)	
102	Chertsey Town (9)	1–4	Kidlington (9)	112
103	Binfield (9)	1–2	Shortwood United (8)	126
104	Badshot Lea (9)	2–4	Fleet Town (8)	75
105	Marlow (8)	1–1	Godalming Town (8)	116
replay	Godalming Town (8)	2–1 (a.e.t.)	Marlow (8)	139
106	Brimscombe & Thrupp (9)	2–2	Bracknell Town (9)	79
replay	Bracknell Town (9)	1–0	Brimscombe & Thrupp (9)	
107	Tuffley Rovers (9)	1–0	Bishop's Cleeve (8)	85
108	Cheltenham Saracens (10)	1–0	Milton United (9)	32
109	Cove (9)	0–7	North Leigh (8)	60
110	Egham Town (8)	2–2	Slimbridge (8)	71
replay	Slimbridge (8)	3–2 (a.e.t.)	Egham Town (8)	92
111	Thatcham Town (9)	3–2	Guildford City (9)	138
112	Hartley Wintney (9)	5–2	Banbury United (8)	186
113	Farnham Town (9)	4–2	Highworth Town (9)	56
114	Hook Norton (10)	1–1	Burnham (8)	100
replay	Burnham (8)	2–4 (a.e.t.)	Hook Norton (10)	76
115	Molesey (8)	7–1	East Grinstead Town (8)	64
116	Chipstead (8)	0–1	Rochester United (9)	55
117	Deal Town (9)	1–1	Horsham (9)	
replay	Horsham (9)	1–2	Deal Town (9)	241
118	Seven Acre & Sidcup (10)	1–2	Sittingbourne (8)	152
119	Ramsgate (8)	0–1	Tooting & Mitcham United (8)	216
120	Folkestone Invicta (8)	3–1	Corinthian (9)	281
121	Herne Bay (8)	3–0	Peacehaven & Telscombe (8)	117
122	Hythe Town (8)	0–2	Chessington & Hook United (9)	140
123	Tunbridge Wells (9)	1–1	Croydon (9)	
replay	Croydon (9)	2–1	Tunbridge Wells (9)	
124	Cray Valley (PM) (9)	0–3	Hastings United (8)	117
125	Holmesdale (9)	1–10	South Park (8)	54
126	Whitstable Town (8)	3–0	Walton Casuals (8)	152
127	Three Bridges (8)	0–1	Cray Wanderers (8)	125
128	Bexhill United (10)	0–5	Faversham Town (8)	150
129	Eastbourne United (9)	1–1	Arundel (9)	
replay	Arundel (9)	1–4	Eastbourne United (9)	
130	Littlehampton Town (9)	0–1	Thamesmead Town (8)	70
131	Chichester City (9)	0–4	Chatham Town (8)	72
132	Shoreham (9)	1–1	Horley Town (9)	142
replay	Horley Town (9)	2–3	Shoreham (9)	
133	Beckenham Town (9)	0–4	Greenwich Borough (9)	75
134	Pagham (9)	3–1	Corinthian-Casuals (8)	116
135	Erith Town (9)	2–4	Horsham YMCA (9)	110
136	Worthing (8)	4–2	Walton & Hersham (8)	306
137	Eastbourne Town (9)	1–1	Whyteleafe (8)	113
replay	Whyteleafe (8)	2–3	Eastbourne Town (9)	113
138	Phoenix Sports (8)	2–2	Guernsey (8)	164
replay	Guernsey (8)	1–2	Phoenix Sports (8)	121
139	Dorking Wanderers (8)	6–2	Canterbury City (9)	73
140	Erith & Belvedere (9)	1–2	Carshalton Athletic (8)	115
141	Winchester City (8)	5–1	Wincanton Town (10)	100
142	Hamworthy United (9)	Not recorded	Andover Town (9)	84
Match ordered to be replayed after the Football Association voided Hamworthy United's 4-1 victory in their first meeting.
replay	Hamworthy United (9)	2–1	Andover Town (9)	87
143	Longwell Green Sports (9)	0–1	Cinderford Town (8)	112
144	Brockenhurst (9)	2–1	Yate Town (8)	82
145	Sholing (9)	2–4	Swindon Supermarine (8)	141
146	Bradford Town (9)	6–3	Christchurch (10)	77
147	Cowes Sports (9)	0–5	Wimborne Town (8)	162
148	Bristol Manor Farm (9)	2–0	Bitton (9)	
149	AFC Portchester (9)	3–1	A.F.C. Totton (8)	145
150	Bashley (8)	0–4	Mangotsfield United (8)	100
151	Almondsbury UWE (10)	3–1	Verwood Town (9)	
152	Moneyfields (9)	1–2	Petersfield Town (8)	108
153	Blackfield & Langley (9)	1–0	Bemerton Heath Harlequins (9)	73
154	Bridport (9)	3–3	Sherborne Town (9)	
replay	Sherborne Town (9)	0–1 (a.e.t.)	Bridport (9)	
155	Plymouth Parkway (10)	4–1	Tiverton Town (8)	213
156	Larkhall Athletic (8)	3–2	Buckland Athletic (9)	135
157	St Austell (10)	0–1	Bodmin Town (10)	351
158	Barnstaple Town (9)	2–0	Bridgwater Town (8)	100
159	Street (9)	1–2	Witheridge (10)	118
160	Taunton Town (8)	5–1	Odd Down (9)	228

== First qualifying round ==
First qualifying round fixtures were played on 12 September 2015, with replays no later than 18 September. A total of 232 teams took part in this stage of the competition, including the 160 winners from the Preliminary round and 72 entering at this stage from the three leagues at Level 7 of English football. The round included eleven teams from Level 10 still in the competition, being the lowest ranked teams in this round.

Tie	Home team (tier)	Score	Away team (tier)	Att.
1	Jarrow Roofing BCA (9)	3–4	Congleton Town (9)	106
2	Buxton (7)	2–1	Ramsbottom United (7)	207
3	Washington (9)	1–0	Runcorn Linnets (9)	129
4	Padiham (9)	0–2	Lancaster City (8)	197
5	Spennymoor Town (8)	2–1	Blyth Spartans (7)	870
6	Droylsden (8)	2–1	Ossett Albion (8)	132
7	Northwich Victoria (8)	4–0	AFC Blackpool (9)	172
8	Workington (7)	5–0	Colwyn Bay (7)	438
9	Consett (9)	3–1	Colne (9)	383
10	Matlock Town (7)	0–0	Whitley Bay (9)	287
replay	Whitley Bay (9)	3–3 (4–2 p)	Matlock Town (7)	338
11	Kendal Town (8)	5–2	Dunston UTS (9)	240
12	Glossop North End (8)	1–1	Skelmersdale United (7)	339
replay	Skelmersdale United (7)	2–1 (a.e.t.)	Glossop North End (8)	248
13	Maltby Main (9)	0–2	Frickley Athletic (7)	202
14	Salford City (7)	1–1	Whitby Town (7)	255
replay	Whitby Town (7)	0–5	Salford City (7)	244
15	Darlington 1883 (7)	1–3	Hyde United (7)	902
16	AFC Liverpool (9)	3–4	Armthorpe Welfare (9)	201
17	Ashton United (7)	0–0	Guisborough Town (9)	133
replay	Guisborough Town (9)	2–3	Ashton United (7)	220
18	Thackley (9)	2–2	Abbey Hey (9)	86
replay	Abbey Hey (9)	1–0	Thackley (9)	60
19	Alsager Town (9)	1–2	Burscough (8)	112
20	Witton Albion (8)	2–1	Farsley Celtic (8)	204
21	Brighouse Town (8)	0–2	Newton Aycliffe (9)	147
22	Marine (7)	2–0	Clitheroe (8)	237
23	Goole (8)	2–2	Bamber Bridge (8)	176
replay	Bamber Bridge (8)	4–2	Goole (8)	151
24	Spalding United (8)	1–0	Nantwich Town (7)	158
25	Hinckley (10)	2–1	Redditch United (7)	295
26	Ilkeston (7)	2–3	Rugby Town (8)	417
27	Tividale (8)	0–1	Stourbridge (7)	237
28	Leamington (7)	1–1	Stamford (7)	401
replay	Stamford (7)	2–1	Leamington (7)	204
29	Market Drayton Town (8)	0–5	Kettering Town (7)	221
30	Coleshill Town (9)	3–3	Newcastle Town (8)	82
replay	Newcastle Town (8)	1–3	Coleshill Town (9)	82
31	Sutton Coldfield Town (7)	0–1	Oadby Town (9)	140
32	Sporting Khalsa (9)	3–2	AFC Wulfrunians (9)	140
33	Clipstone (9)	1–2	Lincoln United (8)	113
34	Shepshed Dynamo (9)	0–0	Rushall Olympic (7)	212
replay	Rushall Olympic (7)	4–1	Shepshed Dynamo (9)	151
35	Holwell Sports (10)	2–2	Bedworth United (7)	211
replay	Bedworth United (7)	2–0 (a.e.t.)	Holwell Sports (10)	124
36	Barwell (7)	4–1	Westfields (9)	36
37	Halesowen Town (7)	2–1	Mickleover Sports (7)	252
38	Basford United (8)	1–0	Long Eaton United (9)	189
39	Chasetown (8)	3–0	Grantham Town (7)	191
40	Stratford Town (7)	0–2	Coalville Town (8)	239
41	Holbeach United (9)	2–2	Stourport Swifts (9)	152
replay	Stourport Swifts (9)	0–1 (a.e.t.)	Holbeach United (9)	
42	Belper Town (8)	1–3	Dunkirk (9)	205
43	Leek Town (8)	2–2	Deeping Rangers (9)	239
replay	Deeping Rangers (9)	4–2	Leek Town (8)	214
44	Beaconsfield SYCOB (8)	1–2	Kirkley & Pakefield (9)	96
45	Long Buckby (10)	0–4	Wingate & Finchley (7)	96
46	Thurrock (8)	1–2	Witham Town (8)	128
47	Hanwell Town (8)	1–0	Saffron Walden Town (9)	135
48	Cogenhoe United (9)	3–2	Leighton Town (8)	84
49	Billericay Town (7)	1–1	Enfield Town (7)	333
replay	Enfield Town (7)	2–0	Billericay Town (7)	309
50	Heybridge Swifts (8)	1–3	Uxbridge (8)	109
51	Potters Bar Town (8)	3–0	Haringey Borough (8)	100
52	Northwood (8)	0–0	Harrow Borough (7)	173
replay	Harrow Borough (7)	0–1	Northwood (8)	156
53	Yaxley (9)	A–A	East Thurrock United (7)	91
Match abandoned after a serious injury to an East Thurrock United player at 0–0 towards the end of the match.
53	Yaxley (9)	1–3	East Thurrock United (7)	76
54	Leiston (7)	1–0	AFC Dunstable (9)	161
55	Peterborough Sports (10)	1–1	Hitchin Town (7)	187
replay	Hitchin Town (7)	4–2 (a.e.t.)	Peterborough Sports (10)	198
56	Harlow Town (8)	5–1	Bedford Town (8)	301
57	A.F.C. Sudbury (8)	3–1	Hendon (7)	211
58	Bury Town (8)	2–1	Cockfosters (9)	275

Tie	Home team (tier)	Score	Away team (tier)	Att.
59	Bedfont & Feltham (10)	1–2	AFC Rushden & Diamonds (8)	100
60	Basildon United (9)	0–1	Hullbridge Sports (9)	160
61	A.F.C. Hornchurch (8)	2–1	Cambridge City (7)	235
62	Ipswich Wanderers (9)	1–0	Canvey Island (7)	208
63	Dunstable Town (7)	2–1	Barton Rovers (8)	181
64	Brantham Athletic (9)	1–2	Biggleswade Town (7)	108
65	Brentwood Town (7)	2–0	Arlesey Town (8)	109
66	Hoddesdon Town (9)	3–1	Ashford Town (Middx) (9)	158
67	Histon (7)	1–5	Aveley (8)	160
68	North Greenford United (8)	0–0	Mildenhall Town (9)	82
replay	Mildenhall Town (9)	1–0	North Greenford United (8)	209
69	Welwyn Garden City (9)	0–1	St Ives Town (8)	257
70	Tilbury (8)	1–1	St. Neots Town (7)	110
replay	Tilbury (8)	2–5	St. Neots Town (7)	97
Match replayed at Tilbury after an FA Investigation found that St Neots Town fielded an ineligible player in the original tie.
71	King's Lynn Town (7)	4–1	Wroxham (8)	617
72	Chesham United (7)	0–0	Aylesbury (8)	336
replay	Aylesbury (8)	1–2	Chesham United (7)	163
73	Needham Market (7)	1–1	Stanway Rovers (9)	211
replay	Stanway Rovers (9)	3–0	Needham Market (7)	240
74	Grays Athletic (7)	5–0	Biggleswade United (9)	182
75	Tooting & Mitcham United (8)	2–1	Farnham Town (9)	183
76	Worthing (8)	2–1	Thamesmead Town (8)	275
77	Metropolitan Police (7)	0–0	Sittingbourne (8)	66
replay	Sittingbourne (8)	1–0	Metropolitan Police (7)	141
78	Pagham (9)	1–2	Carshalton Athletic (8)	141
79	Rochester United (9)	1–3	Herne Bay (8)	107
80	Greenwich Borough (9)	2–3	Slimbridge (8)	154
81	Croydon (9)	1–0	Molesey (8)	71
82	Horsham YMCA (9)	2–1	Burgess Hill Town (7)	140
83	South Park (8)	1–1	Leatherhead (7)	148
replay	Leatherhead (7)	1–3	South Park (8)	186
84	Eastbourne United (9)	0–1	Hook Norton (10)	127
85	Godalming Town (8)	0–1	Kidlington (9)	152
86	Shoreham (9)	2–3	Eastbourne Town (9)	105
87	Tonbridge Angels (7)	1–1	Folkestone Invicta (8)	574
replay	Folkestone Invicta (8)	1–2	Tonbridge Angels (7)	365
88	Hampton & Richmond Borough (7)	0–1	Dulwich Hamlet (7)	404
89	Phoenix Sports (8)	2–0	Lewes (7)	136
90	Whitstable Town (8)	1–1	Deal Town (9)	247
replay	Deal Town (9)	2–0	Whitstable Town (8)	137
91	Dorking Wanderers (8)	0–1	Slough Town (7)	184
92	Bognor Regis Town (7)	2–1	Merstham (7)	299
93	VCD Athletic (7)	1–1	Didcot Town (8)	106
replay	Didcot Town (8)	4–3	VCD Athletic (7)	94
94	Staines Town (7)	2–2	Faversham Town (8)	188
replay	Faversham Town (8)	1–3	Staines Town (7)	172
95	Chessington & Hook United (9)	2–3	North Leigh (8)	87
96	Kingstonian (7)	1–1	Farnborough (7)	282
replay	Farnborough (7)	2–3	Kingstonian (7)	199
97	Hartley Wintney (9)	1–1	Fleet Town (8)	290
replay	Fleet Town (8)	0–4	Hartley Wintney (9)	181
98	Hastings United (8)	1–0	Thatcham Town (9)	322
99	Chatham Town (8)	1–0	Cray Wanderers (8)	170
100	Swindon Supermarine (8)	0–4	Winchester City (8)	219
101	Wimborne Town (8)	3–2	Witheridge (10)	159
102	Shortwood United (8)	4–3	Bracknell Town (9)	85
103	Cinderford Town (8)	1–2	Paulton Rovers (7)	117
104	Taunton Town (8)	3–0	Tuffley Rovers (9)	310
105	Dorchester Town (7)	1–1	Cirencester Town (7)	320
replay	Cirencester Town (7)	3–1	Dorchester Town (7)	132
106	Bridport (9)	2–5	Larkhall Athletic (8)	150
107	Bristol Manor Farm (9)	0–3	AFC Portchester (9)	
108	Hungerford Town (7)	1–1	Bradford Town (9)	132
replay	Bradford Town (9)	2–0	Hungerford Town (7)	131
109	Poole Town (7)	1–0	Barnstaple Town (9)	306
110	Frome Town (7)	0–0	Chippenham Town (7)	370
replay	Chippenham Town (7)	1–0	Frome Town (7)	278
111	Brockenhurst (9)	3–0	Mangotsfield United (8)	100
112	Plymouth Parkway (10)	0–2	Merthyr Town (7)	221
113	Cheltenham Saracens (10)	1–2	Blackfield & Langley (9)	43
114	Bodmin Town (10)	2–0	Almondsbury UWE (10)	138
115	Petersfield Town (8)	3–1	Weymouth (7)	201
116	Bideford (7)	3–1	Hamworthy United (9)	145

== Second qualifying round ==
Second qualifying round fixtures were due to be played on 26 September 2015, with replays no later than 2 October. A total of 160 teams took part in this stage of the competition, including the 116 winners from the first qualifying round and 44 entering at this stage from the two leagues at Level 6 of English football. The round included Bodmin Town, Hinckley and Hook Norton from Level 10 still in the competition, being the lowest ranked teams in this round.

Tie	Home team (tier)	Score	Away team (tier)	Att.
1	Chorley (6)	2–0	Frickley Athletic (7)	542
2	Salford City (7)	2–1	Curzon Ashton (6)	309
3	Spennymoor Town (8)	0–2	Burscough (8)	445
4	Abbey Hey (9)	0–5	Ashton United (7)	240
5	Workington (7)	0–1	Harrogate Town (6)	599
6	Bamber Bridge (8)	2–0	Skelmersdale United (7)	281
7	Kendal Town (8)	2–3	Stalybridge Celtic (6)	323
8	FC United of Manchester (6)	3–1	Witton Albion (8)	1,648
9	Hyde United (7)	Not recorded	Northwich Victoria (8)	418
rematch	Hyde United (7)	1–2	Northwich Victoria (8)	374
A rematch was ordered under replay rules after an FA Investigation found that Northwich Victoria fielded an ineligible player in the original tie, which ended 1-0 to Northwich Victoria.
10	Whitley Bay (9)	2–1	Congleton Town (9)	392
11	Droylsden (8)	2–0	Lancaster City (8)	185
12	Consett (9)	1–2	Bradford Park Avenue (6)	616
13	Marine (7)	3–3	Washington (9)	293
replay	Washington (9)	2–3 (a.e.t.)	Marine (7)	318
14	Armthorpe Welfare (9)	1–6	Buxton (7)	253
15	AFC Fylde (6)	1–0	Stockport County (6)	651
16	Newton Aycliffe (9)	0–0	North Ferriby United (6)	254
replay	North Ferriby United (6)	3–0	Newton Aycliffe (9)	186
17	Holbeach United (9)	1–1	Worcester City (6)	396
replay	Worcester City (6)	2–0	Holbeach United (9)	403
18	Barwell (7)	5–0	Cogenhoe United (9)	128
19	Basford United (8)	2–3	Sporting Khalsa (9)	216
20	Rugby Town (8)	3–2	Lincoln United (8)	260
21	Deeping Rangers (9)	0–3	AFC Rushden & Diamonds (8)	635
22	Halesowen Town (7)	0–2	Nuneaton Town (6)	549
23	Kettering Town (7)	2–1	AFC Telford United (6)	693
24	Gainsborough Trinity (6)	2–0	Boston United (6)	725
25	Coalville Town (8)	0–3	Spalding United (8)	183
26	Corby Town (6)	1–1	Rushall Olympic (7)	439
replay	Rushall Olympic (7)	2–1	Corby Town (6)	168
27	Chasetown (8)	5–2	Hinckley (10)	327
28	Solihull Moors (6)	3–1	Oadby Town (9)	341
29	Hednesford Town (6)	2–0	Bedworth United (7)	445
30	Tamworth (6)	2–3	Alfreton Town (6)	663
31	Stourbridge (7)	3–1	Dunkirk (9)	322
32	Coleshill Town (9)	2–0	Stamford (7)	240
33	Grays Athletic (7)	6–0	Hullbridge Sports (9)	206
34	Maidstone United (6)	6–2	South Park (8)	1,169
35	Hanwell Town (8)	1–0	Mildenhall Town (9)	139
36	Chelmsford City (6)	0–0	Ebbsfleet United (6)	823
replay	Ebbsfleet United (6)	1–2	Chelmsford City (6)	790
37	Phoenix Sports (8)	3–5	A.F.C. Hornchurch (8)	213
38	Dunstable Town (7)	2–0	Kingstonian (7)	173
39	St Albans City (6)	2–1	Deal Town (9)	351
40	Dartford (6)	0–1	Uxbridge (8)	503

Tie	Home team (tier)	Score	Away team (tier)	Att.
41	St Ives Town (8)	0–3	Harlow Town (8)	345
42	St. Neots Town (7)	1–1	Worthing (8)	342
replay	Worthing (8)	2–2 (6–5 p)	St. Neots Town (7)	403
43	Carshalton Athletic (8)	0–5	East Thurrock United (7)	227
44	Wealdstone (6)	1–1	Biggleswade Town (7)	320
replay	Biggleswade Town (7)	0–2	Wealdstone (6)	264
45	Potters Bar Town (8)	1–5	Margate (6)	213
46	Wingate & Finchley (7)	2–1	Concord Rangers (6)	133
47	Eastbourne Borough (6)	2–1	A.F.C. Sudbury (8)	404
48	Bognor Regis Town (7)	2–1	Lowestoft Town (6)	396
49	Tooting & Mitcham United (8)	1–3	Brackley Town (6)	249
50	Whitehawk (6)	4–2	Dulwich Hamlet (7)	355
51	Bury Town (8)	0–3	Hemel Hempstead Town (6)	408
52	Horsham YMCA (9)	2–2	Aveley (8)	168
replay	Aveley (8)	4–1	Horsham YMCA (9)	83
53	Stanway Rovers (9)	0–1	Staines Town (7)	195
54	Chatham Town (8)	1–2	Eastbourne Town (9)	212
55	Brentwood Town (7)	3–1	Croydon (9)	175
56	Sittingbourne (8)	1–2	Hoddesdon Town (9)	205
57	Enfield Town (7)	1–0	Ipswich Wanderers (9)	342
58	Bishop's Stortford (6)	0–2	Sutton United (6)	347
59	King's Lynn Town (7)	1–0	Witham Town (8)	571
60	Kirkley & Pakefield (9)	0–2	Hitchin Town (7)	217
61	Leiston (7)	3–1	Tonbridge Angels (7)	212
62	Northwood (8)	1–2	Didcot Town (8)	154
63	Herne Bay (8)	1–1	Hastings United (8)	274
replay	Hastings United (8)	3–2	Herne Bay (8)	301
64	North Leigh (8)	4–1	Slimbridge (8)	65
65	Hook Norton (10)	1–2	Weston-Super-Mare (6)	533
66	Larkhall Athletic (8)	1–1	Havant & Waterlooville (6)	210
replay	Havant & Waterlooville (6)	4–2	Larkhall Athletic (8)	194
67	Merthyr Town (7)	0–1	Hartley Wintney (9)	280
68	Bradford Town (9)	2–3	Chippenham Town (7)	393
69	Brockenhurst (9)	1–0	AFC Portchester (9)	117
70	Paulton Rovers (7)	0–2	Chesham United (7)	123
71	Bodmin Town (10)	1–2	Bath City (6)	302
72	Gosport Borough (6)	7–0	Bideford (7)	325
73	Winchester City (8)	1–1	Maidenhead United (6)	245
replay	Maidenhead United (6)	4–2	Winchester City (8)	256
74	Taunton Town (8)	2–2	Truro City (6)	481
replay	Truro City (6)	3–1	Taunton Town (8)	236
75	Oxford City (6)	3–1	Shortwood United (8)	201
76	Hayes & Yeading United (6)	2–3	Poole Town (7)	185
77	Wimborne Town (8)	1–6	Blackfield & Langley (9)	209
78	Gloucester City (6)	4–2	Kidlington (9)	393
79	Basingstoke Town (6)	4–2	Slough Town (7)	369
80	Petersfield Town (8)	3–1	Cirencester Town (7)	152

== Third qualifying round ==
Third qualifying round fixtures were due to be played on 10 October 2015, with replays taking place no later than 16 October. A total of 80 teams took part in this stage of the competition, all winners from the second qualifying round. The round included eight teams from Level 9 still in the competition, being the lowest ranked teams in this round.

Tie	Home team (tier)	Score	Away team (tier)	Att.
1	Harrogate Town (6)	3–0	Burscough (8)	513
2	Salford City (7)	1–1	Bradford Park Avenue (6)	534
replay	Bradford Park Avenue (6)	0–1 (a.e.t.)	Salford City (7)	426
3	Whitley Bay (9)	2–3	Chorley (6)	782
4	Stourbridge (7)	1–0	Rushall Olympic (7)	773
5	Solihull Moors (6)	1–1	Worcester City (6)	923
replay	Worcester City (6)	1–0	Solihull Moors (6)	652
6	FC United of Manchester (6)	1–1	Buxton (7)	2,357
replay	Buxton (7)	0–2	FC United of Manchester (6)	874
7	Marine (7)	2–4	Northwich Victoria (8)	417
8	Chasetown (8)	1–1	Stalybridge Celtic (6)	443
replay	Stalybridge Celtic (6)	2–0	Chasetown (8)	318
9	North Ferriby United (6)	2–1	Nuneaton Town (6)	531
10	AFC Fylde (6)	9–0	Coleshill Town (9)	390
11	Barwell (7)	1–0	King's Lynn Town (7)	292
12	Hednesford Town (6)	2–4	Alfreton Town (6)	569
13	Droylsden (8)	3–4	Gainsborough Trinity (6)	306
14	Sporting Khalsa (9)	1–1	Spalding United (8)	425
replay	Spalding United (8)	1–2	Sporting Khalsa (9)	323
15	Brackley Town (6)	1–1	Rugby Town (8)	409
replay	Rugby Town (8)	0–2	Brackley Town (6)	334
16	Kettering Town (7)	1–1	Bamber Bridge (8)	696
replay	Bamber Bridge (8)	3–2	Kettering Town (7)	478
17	AFC Rushden & Diamonds (8)	2–0	Ashton United (7)	630
18	Harlow Town (8)	2–2	Bath City (6)	606
replay	Bath City (6)	1–2	Harlow Town (8)	330

Tie	Home team (tier)	Score	Away team (tier)	Att.
19	East Thurrock United (7)	3–6	Staines Town (7)	283
20	Bognor Regis Town (7)	4–2	Oxford City (6)	515
21	Basingstoke Town (6)	4–2	Chelmsford City (6)	498
22	Maidstone United (6)	2–0	Dunstable Town (7)	1,583
23	Eastbourne Borough (6)	3–2	Hartley Wintney (9)	491
24	Leiston (7)	1–3	Gloucester City (6)	329
25	Hastings United (8)	0–2	Poole Town (7)	735
26	Hoddesdon Town (9)	0–0	Brentwood Town (7)	420
replay	Brentwood Town (7)	2–1	Hoddesdon Town (9)	294
27	Didcot Town (8)	4–1	Eastbourne Town (9)	191
28	Whitehawk (6)	2–2	Gosport Borough (6)	410
replay	Gosport Borough (6)	1–2	Whitehawk (6)	330
29	Enfield Town (7)	0–0	Hitchin Town (7)	883
replay	Hitchin Town (7)	1–2	Enfield Town (7)	486
30	Wingate & Finchley (7)	1–3	Weston-Super-Mare (6)	337
31	Chesham United (7)	2–0	North Leigh (8)	390
32	Hanwell Town (8)	1–2	Grays Athletic (7)	311
33	Margate (6)	4–1	Truro City (6)	550
34	Brockenhurst (9)	1–5	Wealdstone (6)	477
35	Uxbridge (8)	0–3	Chippenham Town (7)	379
36	Hemel Hempstead Town (6)	1–1	Sutton United (6)	707
replay	Sutton United (6)	2–1	Hemel Hempstead Town (6)	418
37	Petersfield Town (8)	0–1	St Albans City (6)	370
38	Aveley (8)	0–2	Havant & Waterlooville (6)	132
39	Worthing (8)	1–4	A.F.C. Hornchurch (8)	757
40	Blackfield & Langley (9)	0–1	Maidenhead United (6)	189

== Fourth qualifying round ==
Fourth qualifying round fixtures were due to be played on 24 October 2015, with replays taking place no later than 30 October. A total of 64 teams took part in this stage of the competition, including the 40 winners from the third qualifying round and 24 entering at this stage from the Conference Premier at Level 5 of English football. The round included Sporting Khalsa from Level 9 still in the competition, being the lowest ranked team in this round.

Tie	Home team (tier)	Score	Away team (tier)	Att.
1	Gateshead (5)	1–2	Worcester City (6)	782
2	AFC Fylde (6)	1–0	Barrow (5)	901
3	Wrexham (5)	0–1	Gainsborough Trinity (6)	1,841
4	Northwich Victoria (8)	0–0	Chorley (6)	534
replay	Chorley (6)	1–2	Northwich Victoria (8)	1,080
5	Harrogate Town (6)	1–4	Grimsby Town (5)	1,920
6	Barwell (7)	2–2	AFC Rushden & Diamonds (8)	819
replay	AFC Rushden & Diamonds (8)	0–1	Barwell (7)	1,162
7	Salford City (7)	1–0	Southport (5)	1,019
8	Sporting Khalsa (9)	1–3	FC United of Manchester (6)	2,252
9	Stalybridge Celtic (6)	1–1	North Ferriby United (6)	547
replay	North Ferriby United (6)	0-0 (7–8 p)	Stalybridge Celtic (6)	710
10	FC Halifax Town (5)	2–2	Guiseley (5)	1,078
replay	Guiseley (5)	1–2 (a.e.t.)	FC Halifax Town (5)	948
11	Tranmere Rovers (5)	0–0	Lincoln City (5)	3,729
replay	Lincoln City (5)	2–0	Tranmere Rovers (5)	2,380
12	Stourbridge (7)	3–0	Kidderminster Harriers (5)	2,032
13	Macclesfield Town (5)	3–2	Alfreton Town (6)	1,048
14	Brackley Town (6)	3–0	Bamber Bridge (8)	451
15	Altrincham (5)	1–0	Chester (5)	1,603

Tie	Home team (tier)	Score	Away team (tier)	Att.
16	Whitehawk (6)	2–0	Poole Town (7)	450
17	Maidenhead United (6)	3–0	Woking (5)	867
18	Basingstoke Town (6)	3–0	Torquay United (5)	793
19	Grays Athletic (7)	1–1	Welling United (5)	512
replay	Welling United (5)	4–0	Grays Athletic (7)	733
20	Boreham Wood (5)	2–1	A.F.C. Hornchurch (8)	307
21	Wealdstone (6)	2–1	Bognor Regis Town (7)	847
22	Didcot Town (8)	4–2	Brentwood Town (7)	347
23	Eastbourne Borough (6)	1–2	Dover Athletic (5)	821
24	Chesham United (7)	2–1	Enfield Town (7)	759
25	Staines Town (7)	2–1	Gloucester City (6)	417
26	Aldershot Town (5)	1–0	Sutton United (6)	1,471
27	Bromley (5)	1–2	Eastleigh (5)	1,101
28	Margate (6)	1–2	Forest Green Rovers (5)	1,302
29	Braintree Town (5)	2–0	Harlow Town (8)	727
30	Havant & Waterlooville (6)	3–3	Cheltenham Town (5)	622
replay	Cheltenham Town (5)	1–0	Havant & Waterlooville (6)	1,628
31	Chippenham Town (7)	0–2	Maidstone United (6)	811
32	St Albans City (6)	2–1	Weston-Super-Mare (6)	829

== Competition proper ==
Winners from the fourth qualifying round advanced to the First round proper, where teams from League One (Level 3) and League Two (Level 4) of English football, operating in The Football League, first enter the competition. See 2015–16 FA Cup for a report of first round proper onwards.

== Broadcasting rights ==
The qualifying rounds aren't covered by the FA Cup's broadcasting contracts held by BBC Sport and BT Sport, although one game was televised.

The following qualifying rounds matches were broadcast live on UK television:

Round	Tie	Broadcaster
Fourth qualifying round	Margate vs Forest Green Rovers	BT Sport
