= 1983–84 Combined Counties Football League =

The 1983–84 Combined Counties Football League season was the sixth in the history of the Combined Counties Football League, a football competition in England.

The league was won by Godalming Town for the first time.

== League table ==
Combined Counties Football League
- Season: 1983–84
- Champions: Godalming Town
- Matches: 272
- Goals: 786 (2.89 per match)

The league was reduced from 18 to 17 clubs after Lingfield left to join the Sussex County League and no new clubs joined.

Pos	Team	Pld	W	D	L	GF	GA	GD	Pts	Promotion or relegation
1	Godalming Town	32	22	4	6	59	24	+35	70	
2	Malden Town	32	20	7	5	81	34	+47	67	
3	Ash United	32	17	9	6	55	32	+23	60	
4	Chobham	32	17	6	9	42	31	+11	57	
5	Hartley Wintney	32	16	5	11	50	41	+9	55 (Note: Hartley Wintney had two points awarded.)	
6	Westfield	32	13	6	13	53	45	+8	45	
7	Guildford & Worplesdon	32	11	11	10	56	51	+5	44	Left at the end of the season
8	Farnham Town	32	10	15	7	49	45	+4	44 (Note: Farnham Town had one point deducted.)	
9	Virginia Water	32	12	7	13	34	41	−7	43	
10	Cobham	32	11	8	13	30	48	−18	41	
11	British Aerospace (Weybridge)	32	11	6	15	51	55	−4	39	
12	Frimley Green	32	11	5	16	42	45	−3	38	
13	Cove	32	9	9	14	37	50	−13	36	
14	Yateley Town	32	9	7	16	34	54	−20	34	Left at the end of the season
15	Cranleigh	32	8	6	18	34	58	−24	30	
16	Alton Town	32	8	5	19	50	75	−25	29	Resigned to the Hampshire League
17	Chessington United	32	4	10	18	29	57	−28	22	Left at the end of the season

Rules for classification: The system of using goal difference to separate two teams tied on points was used.
