= 1991–92 Combined Counties Football League =

The 1991–92 Combined Counties Football League season was the 14th in the history of the Combined Counties Football League, a football competition in England.

The league was won by Farnham Town for the second season in succession, who subsequently left to join the Isthmian League.

== League table ==
Combined Counties Football League
- Season: 1991–92
- Champions: Farnham Town
- Matches: 342
- Goals: 1,108 (3.24 per match)

The league was increased from 17 clubs to 19 after two new clubs joined:

- Ditton, joining from the Surrey Premier League.
- Viking Sports, joining from the Hellenic League Division One.

Pos	Team	Pld	W	D	L	GF	GA	GD	Pts	Promotion or relegation
1	Farnham Town	36	26	7	3	89	28	+61	85	Promoted to the Isthmian League Division Three
2	Malden Town	36	21	7	8	72	39	+33	70	Folded at the end of the season
3	Chipstead	36	19	7	10	68	46	+22	64	
4	Cobham	36	17	10	9	81	56	+25	61	
5	Ditton	36	16	11	9	61	44	+17	59	
6	Ashford Town	36	17	7	12	57	41	+16	58	
7	Cranleigh	36	18	3	15	68	62	+6	57	
8	Bedfont	36	16	8	12	56	40	+16	56	
9	Ash United	36	14	13	9	63	52	+11	55	
10	Steyning Town	36	16	6	14	67	65	+2	54	
11	Farleigh Rovers	36	14	9	13	53	59	−6	51	
12	Viking Sports	36	13	10	13	59	49	+10	49	
13	Frimley Green	36	13	9	14	64	61	+3	48	
14	Merstham	36	12	6	18	49	68	−19	42	
15	Hartley Wintney	36	12	5	19	50	70	−20	41	
16	Westfield	36	8	10	18	43	60	−17	34	
17	Godalming Town	36	6	8	22	35	76	−41	26	
18	Horley Town	36	5	8	23	39	83	−44	23	
19	Sandhurst Town	36	6	2	28	34	109	−75	20	

Rules for classification: The system of using goal difference to separate two teams tied on points was used.
