= 1981–82 Combined Counties Football League =

The 1981–82 Combined Counties Football League season was the fourth in the history of the Combined Counties Football League, a football competition in England.

With the arrival of several new clubs, the league was split into two divisions – East and West. The Eastern Division was won by Malden Town, after they won the league the previous season. The Western Division was won by Ash United. There was a championship playoff, which was won 3–0 on aggregate by Ash United. There was no promotion or relegation, although some clubs left the league at the end of the season and it reverted to a single division.

The league switched to the system of three points for a win, instead of two.

== Eastern Division ==
Combined Counties Football League Eastern Division
- Season: 1981–82
- Champions: Malden Town
- Matches: 110
- Goals: 373 (3.39 per match)

The Eastern Division featured eleven clubs, all from the previous season Combined Counties League.

=== League table ===
Pos	Team	Pld	W	D	L	GF	GA	GD	Pts	Promotion or relegation
1	Malden Town	20	16	4	0	61	11	+50	52	
2	Lingfield	20	13	3	4	44	26	+18	42	
3	Westfield	20	9	4	7	46	35	+11	31	
4	British Aerospace (Weybridge)	20	8	7	5	35	31	+4	31	
5	Cobham	20	8	5	7	30	25	+5	29	
6	Godalming Town	20	6	8	6	29	28	+1	26	
7	Virginia Water	20	7	3	10	24	29	−5	24	
8	Cranleigh	20	6	5	9	28	40	−12	23	
9	Chessington United	20	5	6	9	29	40	−11	21	
10	Clarion	20	4	8	8	26	41	−15	20	Resigned to the Surrey Premier League
11	Sheerwater	20	1	1	18	21	67	−46	4	Resigned to the Surrey Premier League

Rules for classification: The system of using goal difference to separate two teams tied on points was used.

== Western Division ==
Combined Counties Football League Western Division
- Season: 1981–82
- Champions: Ash United
- Matches: 110
- Goals: 321 (2.92 per match)

The Western Division featured seven clubs from the previous season Combined Counties League along with four new clubs:

- Alton Town, joining from the Athenian League.
- Chobham, joining from the London Spartan League Premier Division.
- Cove, joining from the Hampshire League.
- Frimley Green, joining from the London Spartan League Senior Division.

=== League table ===
Pos	Team	Pld	W	D	L	GF	GA	GD	Pts	Promotion or relegation
1	Ash United	20	15	2	3	38	21	+17	47	
2	Alton Town	20	12	3	5	32	17	+15	39	
3	Farnham Town	20	9	8	3	37	23	+14	35	
4	Hartley Wintney	20	7	10	3	33	23	+10	31	
5	Guildford & Worplesdon	20	7	6	7	34	31	+3	27	
6	Chobham	20	7	6	7	33	33	0	27	
7	Frimley Green	20	7	3	10	27	27	0	24	
8	Cove	20	6	6	8	27	30	−3	24	
9	Lightwater	20	7	1	12	18	37	−19	22	Resigned to the Surrey Premier League
10	Wrecclesham	20	3	7	10	25	39	−14	16	Resigned to the Surrey Premier League
11	Yateley Town	20	1	6	13	17	40	−23	9	

Rules for classification: The system of using goal difference to separate two teams tied on points was used.
