= 2015–16 FA Cup =

Football Association Challenge Cup

Tournament details
- Country: England; Guernsey; Wales
- Dates: 15 August 2015 – 21 May 2016
- Teams: 736

Final positions
- Champions: Manchester United (12th title)
- Runners-up: Crystal Palace

Tournament statistics
- Matches played: 149
- Goals scored: 412 (2.77 per match)
- Attendance: 2,098,077 (14,081 per match)
- Top goal scorer(s): Matěj Vydra (6 goals)
- (Note: All statistics do not include qualifying play-offs)

The 2015–16 FA Cup (also known as the FA Challenge Cup) was the 135th edition of the oldest recognised football tournament in the world. It was sponsored by Emirates, and known as the Emirates FA Cup for sponsorship purposes. It began with the extra preliminary round on 15 August 2015, and concluded with the final on 21 May 2016. The FA Cup winner qualifies for the 2016–17 UEFA Europa League group stage.

Premier League side Arsenal were the two-time defending champions after they beat Aston Villa 4–0 in the previous final on 30 May 2015, but were eliminated by Watford in the sixth round.

The winners were Manchester United, who defeated Crystal Palace 2–1 in the final after extra time for their record-tying 12th title.

== Teams ==
Round	Clubs remaining	Clubs involved	Winners from previous round	New entries this round	Leagues entering at this round
First round proper	124	80	32	48	EFL League One; EFL League Two
Second round proper	84	40	40	none	none
Third round proper	64	64	20	44	Premier League; EFL Championship
Fourth round proper	32	32	32	none	none
Fifth round proper	16	16	16	none	none
Quarter-finals	8	8	8	none	none
Semi-finals	4	4	4	none	none
Final	2	2	2	none	none

== Prize fund ==
Round	No. of Clubs receive fund	Prize fund per club
Extra preliminary round winners	184	£1,500
Preliminary round winners	160	£1,925
First round qualifying winners	116	£3,000
Second round qualifying winners	80	£4,500
Third round qualifying winners	40	£7,500
Fourth round qualifying winners	32	£12,500
First round proper winners	40	£18,000
Second round proper winners	20	£27,000
Third round proper winners	32	£67,500
Fourth round proper winners	16	£90,000
Fifth round proper winners	8	£180,000
Sixth round proper winners	4	£360,000
Semi-Final losers	2	£450,000
Semi-Final winners	2	£900,000
Final runners-up	1	£900,000
Final winner	1	£1,800,000
Total		£15,132,000

== Round and draw dates ==
The schedule are as follows.

Phase	Round	Draw date	Match date
Qualifying rounds	Extra preliminary round	3 July 2015	15 August 2015
Qualifying rounds	Preliminary round	3 July 2015	29 August 2015
Qualifying rounds	First round qualifying	24 August 2015	12 September 2015
Qualifying rounds	Second round qualifying	14 September 2015	26 September 2015
Qualifying rounds	Third round qualifying	28 September 2015	10 October 2015
Qualifying rounds	Fourth round qualifying	12 October 2015	24 October 2015
Main tournament	First round proper	26 October 2015, 19:00 GMT	7 November 2015
Main tournament	Second round proper	9 November 2015, 19:00 GMT	5 December 2015
Main tournament	Third round proper	7 December 2015, 19:00 GMT	9 January 2016
Main tournament	Fourth round proper	11 January 2016, 19:15 GMT	30 January 2016
Main tournament	Fifth round proper	31 January 2016, 18:15 GMT	20 February 2016
Main tournament	Sixth round proper	21 February 2016, 18:15 GMT	12 March 2016
Main tournament	Semi-finals	14 March 2016	23 and 24 April 2016
Main tournament	Final	14 March 2016	21 May 2016

== Qualifying rounds ==
All teams that entered the competition, but were not members of the Premier League or The Football League, competed in the qualifying rounds to secure one of 32 places available in the first round proper.

The winners from the fourth qualifying round were Worcester City, AFC Fylde, Gainsborough Trinity, Northwich Victoria, Barwell, Grimsby Town, Salford City, FC Halifax Town, Lincoln City, Stalybridge Celtic, FC United of Manchester, Macclesfield Town, Brackley Town, Altrincham, Stourbridge, Maidenhead United, Basingstoke Town, Whitehawk, Didcot Town, Boreham Wood, Welling United, Chesham United, Dover Athletic, Wealdstone, Staines Town, Eastleigh, Aldershot Town, Forest Green Rovers, Braintree Town, Cheltenham Town, Maidstone United and St Albans City.

Barwell, Salford City, Whitehawk and Didcot Town were appearing in the competition proper for the first time. Of the other qualifying clubs, Gainsborough Trinity had last featured in the first round in 2007–08, Stalybridge Celtic had last done so in 2003-04 and Chesham United had last done so in 1994-95.

== First round proper ==
The first round draw took place on 26 October at 7pm at the club house of the FA Charter Standard Community Club Thackley Juniors F.C. based in Thackley in West Yorkshire, and was broadcast live on BBC Two and BBC Radio 5 Live. The first round proper were played on the weekend of 7 November. The 32 teams from the qualifying competition joined the 48 teams from League One and League Two to compete in this round. The round included two teams from Level 8 still in the competition, Northwich Victoria and Didcot Town, which were the lowest-ranked teams in this round; Northwich Victoria advanced to become the lowest-ranked team in the second round.

7 November 2015	Burton Albion (3)	0–4	Peterborough United (3)	Burton-upon-Trent
15:00		Report	Washington 41', 71', 81'; J Anderson 84'	Stadium: Pirelli Stadium; Attendance: 2,517; Referee: David Webb

8 November 2015	Port Vale (3)	1–1	Maidenhead United (6)	Burslem, Stoke-on-Trent
15:00	Moore 41'	Report	Mulley 90+4'	Stadium: Vale Park; Attendance: 3,977; Referee: Adrian Holmes

19 November 2015 Replay	Maidenhead United (6)	1–4	Port Vale (3)	Maidenhead
19:45	Massey 15'	Report	O'Connor 35'; Leitch-Smith 49', 57', 67'	Stadium: York Road; Attendance: 2,212; Referee: Dean Whitestone

7 November 2015	Barnet (4)	3–0	Blackpool (3)	Canons Park
15:00	Champion 36'; Gash 41', 51'	Report		Stadium: The Hive Stadium; Attendance: 1,869; Referee: Kevin Johnson

8 November 2015	Bristol Rovers (4)	0–2	Chesham United (7)	Bristol
14:00		Report	Blake 77', 87'	Stadium: Memorial Stadium; Attendance: 5,181; Referee: Andy Davies

7 November 2015	Cambridge United (4)	2–0	Basingstoke Town (6)	Cambridge
15:00	Hughes 19', 29'	Report		Stadium: Abbey Stadium; Attendance: 2,974; Referee: John Brooks

7 November 2015	Mansfield Town (4)	0–0	Oldham Athletic (3)	Mansfield
15:00		Report		Stadium: Field Mill; Attendance: 2,886; Referee: Tony Harrington

17 November 2015 Replay	Oldham Athletic (3)	3–0	Mansfield Town (4)	Oldham
19:45	Philliskirk 70'; Poleon 78', 88'	Report		Stadium: Boundary Park; Attendance: 1,893; Referee: Lee Collins

7 November 2015	Altrincham (5)	2–0	Barnsley (3)	Altrincham
15:00	Reeves 90+6', 90+16'	Report		Stadium: Moss Lane; Attendance: 2,571; Referee: Andy Haines

7 November 2015	Crewe Alexandra (3)	0–1	Eastleigh (5)	Crewe
15:00		Report	Strevens 90+5' (pen.)	Stadium: Gresty Road; Attendance: 3,008; Referee: Carl Boyeson

7 November 2015	Northwich Victoria (8)	1–1	Boreham Wood (5)	Northwich
15:00	Williams 90+12'	Report	Morias 90+3'	Stadium: Wincham Park; Attendance: 502; Referee: Wayne Barratt

16 November 2015 Replay	Boreham Wood (5)	1–2	Northwich Victoria (8)	Borehamwood
19:45	MacDonald 90'	Report	Williams 90+8'; Astles 90+12'	Stadium: Meadow Park; Attendance: 512; Referee: Andy Woolmer

7 November 2015	Coventry City (3)	1–2	Northampton Town (4)	Coventry
15:00	Murphy 90'	Report	Diamond 90+5'; Richards 90+8'	Stadium: Ricoh Arena; Attendance: 9,124; Referee: Darren Handley

8 November 2015	Brackley Town (6)	2–2	Newport County (4)	Brackley
14:00	Graham 90+9'; McDonald 90+10'	Report	John-Lewis 90+15' (pen.); Bennett 90+18'	Stadium: St. James Park; Attendance: 1,708; Referee: Mark Haywood

17 November 2015 Replay	Newport County (4)	4–1	Brackley Town (6)	Newport
19:45	John-Lewis 90+1'; Klukowski 90+17'; Rodman 90+63'; Hawtin 90+71' (o.g.)	Report	Hawtin 39'	Stadium: Rodney Parade; Attendance: 1,511; Referee: Stuart Attwell

7 November 2015	Grimsby Town (5)	5–1	St Albans City (6)	Cleethorpes
15:00	Townsend 30'; Amond 45', 90'; Pittman 71'; Marshall 84'	Report	Theophanous 62'	Stadium: Blundell Park; Attendance: 2,263; Referee: Ryan Johnson

7 November 2015	Hartlepool United (4)	1–0	Cheltenham Town (5)	Hartlepool
15:00	Oyenuga 45'	Report		Stadium: Victoria Park; Attendance: 2,287; Referee: James Adcock

6 November 2015	Salford City (7)	2–0	Notts County (4)	Salford
19:55	Webber 46'; Allen 73'	Report		Stadium: Moor Lane; Attendance: 1,400; Referee: Andrew Madley

7 November 2015	Dover Athletic (5)	1–2	Stourbridge (7)	River
15:00	Thomas 33'	Report	Lait 8'; Hawley 69' (pen.)	Stadium: Crabble Athletic Ground; Attendance: 1,392; Referee: Richard Martin

7 November 2015	Stevenage (4)	3–0	Gillingham (3)	Stevenage
15:00	Schumacher 13'; Whelpdale 29'; Gnanduillet 90'	Report		Stadium: Broadhall Way; Attendance: 1,619; Referee: Trevor Kettle

7 November 2015	Millwall (3)	3–1	AFC Fylde (6)	London
15:00	O´Brien 54'; Gregory 60'; Morison 88'	Report	Whittle 62'	Stadium: The Den; Attendance: 3,445; Referee: Steve Martin

8 November 2015	Aldershot Town (5)	0–0	Bradford City (3)	Aldershot
14:00		Report		Stadium: Recreation Ground; Attendance: 2,640; Referee: Ben Toner

18 November 2015 Replay	Bradford City (3)	2–0	Aldershot Town (5)	Bradford
19:45	Leigh 61'; McMahon 76' (pen.)	Report		Stadium: Valley Parade; Attendance: 2,930; Referee: Keith Hill

7 November 2015	Walsall (3)	2–0	Fleetwood Town (3)	Walsall
15:00	Evans 19'; Forde 90+2'	Report		Stadium: Bescot Stadium; Attendance: 2,532; Referee: Ross Joyce

7 November 2015	Bury (3)	4–0	Wigan Athletic (3)	Bury
15:00	Pope 19'; Mayor 34'; Cameron 45+2'; Clarke 65'	Report		Stadium: Gigg Lane; Attendance: 3,856; Referee: David Coote

7 November 2015	Portsmouth (4)	2–1	Macclesfield Town (5)	Portsmouth
15:00	McGurk 3', 45'	Report	Dennis 15'	Stadium: Fratton Park; Attendance: 9,834; Referee: Lee Swabey

7 November 2015	Sheffield United (3)	3–0	Worcester City (6)	Sheffield
15:00	Baxter 19' (pen.); Sammon 81'; Freeman 90'	Report		Stadium: Bramall Lane; Attendance: 11,108; Referee: Simon Bennett

7 November 2015	Barwell (7)	0–2	Welling United (5)	Barwell
15:00		Report	Wellard 34'; Oluwabunmi Bakare 90'	Stadium: Kirkby Road; Attendance: 843; Referee: Steve Rushton

8 November 2015	FC Halifax Town (5)	0–4	Wycombe Wanderers (4)	Halifax
14:00		Report	Thompson 17'; Jombati 65'; Kretzschmar 84'; Amadi-Holloway 90'	Stadium: The Shay; Attendance: 1,789; Referee: Graham Salisbury

7 November 2015	Crawley Town (4)	1–2	Luton Town (4)	Crawley
15:00	Harrold 63'	Report	McQuoid 54', 89'	Stadium: Broadfield Stadium; Attendance: 1,929; Referee: Nick Kinseley

7 November 2015	Doncaster Rovers (3)	2–0	Stalybridge Celtic (6)	Doncaster
15:00	Williams 3', 68'	Report		Stadium: Keepmoat Stadium; Attendance: 3,991; Referee: Martin Coy

8 November 2015	Didcot Town (8)	0–3	Exeter City (4)	Didcot
12:00		Report	Morrison 48'; Nichols 73'; Nicholls 78'	Stadium: Loop Meadow Stadium; Attendance: 2,707; Referee: Chris Kavanagh

7 November 2015	Dagenham & Redbridge (4)	0–0	Morecambe (4)	Dagenham
15:00		Report		Stadium: Victoria Road; Attendance: 900; Referee: Tim Robinson

17 November 2015 Replay	Morecambe (4)	2–4	Dagenham & Redbridge (4)	Morecambe
19:45	Barkhuizen 6'; Wildig 7'	Report	Vassell 13' (pen.), 50'; Dunne 37'; Labadie 70'	Stadium: Globe Arena; Attendance: 1,176; Referee: Geoff Eltringham

7 November 2015	Leyton Orient (4)	6–1	Staines Town (7)	Leyton
15:00	Palmer 8', 13'; Cox 12', 33'; Marquis 89'; Clohessy 90+4'	Report	Purse 23'	Stadium: Brisbane Road; Attendance: 2,287; Referee: Robert Jones

8 November 2015	Gainsborough Trinity (6)	0–1	Shrewsbury Town (3)	Gainsborough
14:00		Report	Collins 71'	Stadium: The Northolme; Attendance: 2,180; Referee: Darren Bond

8 November 2015	Maidstone United (6)	0–1	Yeovil Town (4)	Maidstone
14:00		Report	Fogden 55'	Stadium: Gallagher Stadium; Attendance: 2,811; Referee: Michael Bull

8 November 2015	Braintree Town (5)	1–1	Oxford United (4)	Braintree
14:00	Davis 63'	Report	Taylor 15'	Stadium: Cressing Road; Attendance: 1,248; Referee: Phil Gibbs

17 November 2015 Replay	Oxford United (4)	3–1	Braintree Town (5)	Oxford
19:45	Sercombe 42'; Hoban 64', 80' (pen.)	Report	David 33' (pen.)	Stadium: Kassam Stadium; Attendance: 3,265; Referee: Darren England

8 November 2015	Whitehawk (6)	5–3	Lincoln City (5)	Whitehawk
14:00	Mills 6'; Robinson 27'; Deering 58', 90+6' (pen.); Martin 86'	Report	Rhead 45+5' (pen.), 63', 90+1'	Stadium: The Enclosed Ground; Attendance: 1,342; Referee: Constantine Hatzidakis

7 November 2015	Accrington Stanley (4)	3–2	York City (4)	Accrington
15:00	McConville 29'; Crooks 36'; Windass 48' (pen.)	Report	Oliver 34'; Coulson 90+2'	Stadium: Crown Ground; Attendance: 1,475; Referee: Fred Graham

7 November 2015	Scunthorpe United (3)	2–1	Southend United (3)	Scunthorpe
15:00	Madden 16', 78'	Report	Leonard 30'	Stadium: Glanford Park; Attendance: 3,335; Referee: Peter Bankes

7 November 2015	AFC Wimbledon (4)	1–2	Forest Green Rovers (5)	Kingston upon Thames
15:00	Kennedy 24'	Report	Carter 6'; Frear 90+3'	Stadium: Kingsmeadow; Attendance: 2,465; Referee: Graham Horwood

7 November 2015	Plymouth Argyle (4)	0–2	Carlisle United (4)	Plymouth
15:00		Report	Sweeney 23'; Hope 41'	Stadium: Home Park; Attendance: 6,005; Referee: Charles Breakspear

9 November 2015	F.C. United of Manchester (6)	1–4	Chesterfield (3)	Manchester
19:45	Ashworth 90+1'	Report	Ariyibi 7'; Novak 12'; Simons 68'; Banks 87'	Stadium: Broadhurst Park; Attendance: 2,916; Referee: Oliver Langford

7 November 2015	Rochdale (3)	3–1	Swindon Town (3)	Rochdale
15:00	Mendez-Laing 24', 46', 69' (pen.)	Report	Ajose 71' (pen.)	Stadium: Spotland Stadium; Attendance: 2,060; Referee: Chris Sarginson

7 November 2015	Wealdstone (6)	2–6	Colchester United (3)	Ruislip
15:00	Louis 31' (pen.); Hudson-Odoi 38'	Report	Bonne 26', 44', 47', 68'; Moncur 82'; Sordell 90'	Stadium: Vale Stadium; Attendance: 2,440; Referee: Brendan Malone

== Second round proper ==
The second round draw took place on 9 November at Civil Service, based in Chiswick, London, and was broadcast live on BBC Two.

The lowest-ranked side in this round was Northwich Victoria, who competed at level 8 of English football.

4 December 2015	Salford City (7)	1–1	Hartlepool United (4)	Salford
19:55 GMT	O'Halloran 23'	Report	Oates 8' (pen.)	Stadium: Moor Lane; Attendance: 1,400; Referee: Gavin Ward

15 December 2015 Replay	Hartlepool United (4)	2–0 (a.e.t.)	Salford City (7)	Hartlepool
19:45 GMT	Fenwick 97'; Mandron 120'	Report		Stadium: Victoria Park; Attendance: 4,374

5 December 2015	Barnet (4)	0–1	Newport County (4)	Canons Park, London
15:00 GMT		Report	Boden 59'	Stadium: The Hive Stadium; Attendance: 1,767; Referee: Dean Whitestone

5 December 2015	Portsmouth (4)	1–0	Accrington Stanley (4)	Portsmouth
15:00 GMT	McGurk 21'	Report		Stadium: Fratton Park, Portsmouth; Attendance: 9,258; Referee: Kevin Johnson

5 December 2015	Stourbridge (7)	0–2	Eastleigh (5)	Amblecote
15:00 GMT		Report	Constable 59'; Payne 77'	Stadium: War Memorial Ground; Attendance: 2,086; Referee: Ben Toner

5 December 2015	Northampton Town (4)	3–2	Northwich Victoria (8)	Northampton
15:00 GMT	Hoskins 83'; Taylor 85'; Calvert-Lewin 87'	Report	Ball 44'; Bennett 63'	Stadium: Sixfields Stadium; Attendance: 3,837; Referee: Paul Tierney

5 December 2015	Yeovil Town (4)	1–0	Stevenage (4)	Yeovil
15:00 GMT	Tozer 86'	Report		Stadium: Huish Park; Attendance: 2,264; Referee: Chris Sarginson

5 December 2015	Leyton Orient (4)	0–0	Scunthorpe United (3)	Leyton
15:00 GMT		Report		Stadium: Brisbane Road; Attendance: 2,540; Referee: James Linington

15 December 2015 Replay	Scunthorpe United (3)	3–0	Leyton Orient (4)	Scunthorpe
19:45 GMT	Mvoto 55' (o.g.); King 60'; Adelakun 90+4'	Report		Stadium: Glanford Park; Attendance: 3,082; Referee: David Webb

5 December 2015	Millwall (3)	1–2	Wycombe Wanderers (4)	London
15:00 GMT	Thompson 57'	Report	Hayes 50'; Harriman 90+4'	Stadium: The Den; Attendance: 3,960; Referee: Fred Graham

5 December 2015	Chesterfield (3)	1–1	Walsall (3)	Chesterfield
15:00 GMT	Novak 90+3'	Report	Demetriou 19'	Stadium: Proact Stadium; Attendance: 4,126; Referee: Richard Clark

15 December 2015 Replay	Walsall (3)	0–0 (a.e.t.) (5–3 p)	Chesterfield (3)	Walsall
19:45 GMT		Report		Stadium: Bescot Stadium; Attendance: 2,953; Referee: Charles Breakspear
	Penalties
	Sawyers (penalty scored); Demetriou (penalty scored); Evans (penalty scored); Lalkovič (penalty scored); Downing (penalty scored)		O'Shea (penalty scored); Morsy (penalty missed); Novak (penalty scored); O'Neil (penalty scored)

5 December 2015	Sheffield United (3)	1–0	Oldham Athletic (3)	Sheffield
15:00 GMT	Done 47'	Report		Stadium: Bramall Lane; Attendance: 6,938; Referee: Eddie Ilderton

6 December 2015	Rochdale (3)	0–1	Bury (3)	Rochdale
12:00 GMT		Report	Rose 8'	Stadium: Spotland Stadium; Attendance: 4,887; Referee: Darren Drysdale

6 December 2015	Bradford City (3)	4–0	Chesham United (7)	Bradford
14:00 GMT	Reid 22'; Hanson 43'; Liddle 90+1'; Cole 90+2'	Report		Stadium: Valley Parade; Attendance: 6,047; Referee: Scott Duncan

6 December 2015	Peterborough United (3)	2–0	Luton Town (4)	Peterborough
14:00 GMT	Washington 35'; Maddison 82'	Report		Stadium: London Road Stadium; Attendance: 8,329; Referee: Nigel Miller

6 December 2015	Exeter City (4)	2–0	Port Vale (3)	Exeter
14:00 GMT	Tillson 19'; Watkins 89'	Report		Stadium: St James Park; Attendance: 3,565; Referee: Trevor Kettle

6 December 2015	Cambridge United (4)	1–3	Doncaster Rovers (3)	Cambridge
14:00 GMT	Berry 23'	Report	Grant 46', 57'; Lund 56'	Stadium: Abbey Stadium; Attendance: 3,951; Referee: Mark Brown

6 December 2015	Welling United (5)	0–5	Carlisle United (4)	Welling
14:00 GMT		Report	Wyke 18', 71', 90'; Sweeney 45'; Grainger 67' (pen.)	Stadium: Park View Road; Attendance: 2,028; Referee: Simon Hooper

6 December 2015	Colchester United (3)	3–2	Altrincham (5)	Colchester
14:00 GMT	Harriott 14', 90+4'; Lapslie 53'	Report	Moult 3'; Rankine 46'	Stadium: Colchester Community Stadium; Attendance: 2,592; Referee: Andy Davies

6 December 2015	Dagenham & Redbridge (4)	1–1	Whitehawk (6)	Dagenham
14:00 GMT	Cureton 5'	Report	Rose 90+5'	Stadium: Victoria Road; Attendance: 1,983; Referee: Lee Swabey

16 December 2015 Replay	Whitehawk (6)	2–3 (a.e.t.)	Dagenham & Redbridge (4)	Whitehawk
19:45 GMT	Mills 32'; Gotta 90+3'	Report	Vassell 44'; Passley 77'; Obileye 100'	Stadium: The Enclosed Ground; Attendance: 2,174; Referee: Keith Stroud

6 December 2015	Oxford United (4)	1–0	Forest Green Rovers (5)	Oxford
14:00 GMT	Roofe 76'	Report		Stadium: Kassam Stadium; Attendance: 4,618; Referee: Robert Lewis

7 December 2015	Grimsby Town (5)	0–0	Shrewsbury Town (3)	Cleethorpes
19:45 GMT		Report		Stadium: Blundell Park; Attendance: 3,366; Referee: Seb Stockbridge

15 December 2015 Replay	Shrewsbury Town (3)	1–0	Grimsby Town (5)	Shrewsbury
19:45 GMT	Ogogo 90+2'	Report		Stadium: New Meadow; Attendance: 2,730; Referee: Dean Whitestone

== Third round proper ==
A total of 64 teams played in this round: 44 teams from Premier League and Football League Championship which entered in this round, and the 20 winners of the previous round. The draw was held on 7 December 2015.

The lowest-ranked team in this round was Eastleigh from the National League (tier 5), the only non-league side remaining in the competition.

8 January 2016	Exeter City (4)	2–2	Liverpool (1)	Exeter
19:55 GMT	Nichols 9'; Holmes 45'	Report	Sinclair 12'; Smith 73'	Stadium: St James Park; Attendance: 8,298; Referee: Stuart Attwell

20 January 2016 Replay	Liverpool (1)	3–0	Exeter City (4)	Liverpool
20:00 GMT	Allen 10'; Ojo 74'; Teixeira 82'	Report		Stadium: Anfield; Attendance: 43,292; Referee: Neil Swarbrick

9 January 2016	Wycombe Wanderers (4)	1–1	Aston Villa (1)	High Wycombe
12:45 GMT	Jacobson 50' (pen.)	Report	Richards 22'	Stadium: Adams Park; Attendance: 9,298; Referee: Michael Oliver

19 January 2016 Replay	Aston Villa (1)	2–0	Wycombe Wanderers (4)	Birmingham
19:45 GMT	Clark 75'; Gueye 90'	Report		Stadium: Villa Park; Attendance: 20,706; Referee: Craig Pawson

9 January 2016	Watford (1)	1–0	Newcastle United (1)	Watford
15:00 GMT	Deeney 44'	Report		Stadium: Vicarage Road; Attendance: 18,259; Referee: Roger East

9 January 2016	West Bromwich Albion (1)	2–2	Bristol City (2)	West Bromwich
15:00 GMT	Berahino 67'; Morrison 90'	Report	Kodjia 74'; Agard 83'	Stadium: The Hawthorns; Attendance: 24,917; Referee: Graham Scott

19 January 2016 Replay	Bristol City (2)	0–1	West Bromwich Albion (1)	Bristol
19:45 GMT		Report	Rondón 52'	Stadium: Ashton Gate Stadium; Attendance: 15,185; Referee: Jon Moss

9 January 2016	West Ham United (1)	1–0	Wolverhampton Wanderers (2)	London
15:00 GMT	Jelavić 85'	Report		Stadium: Boleyn Ground; Attendance: 34,547; Referee: Anthony Taylor

9 January 2016	Hartlepool United (4)	1–2	Derby County (2)	Hartlepool
15:00 GMT	Gray 61'	Report	Butterfield 67'; Bent 85'	Stadium: Victoria Park; Attendance: 4,860; Referee: Darren Bond

9 January 2016	Colchester United (3)	2–1	Charlton Athletic (2)	Colchester
15:00 GMT	Moncur 28'; Sordell 41'	Report	Ghoochannejhad 90'	Stadium: Colchester Community Stadium; Attendance: 5,742; Referee: Chris Kavanagh

9 January 2016	Peterborough United (3)	2–0	Preston North End (2)	Peterborough
15:00 GMT	Samuelsen 7'; Washington 52'	Report		Stadium: London Road Stadium; Attendance: 7,665; Referee: Tony Harrington

9 January 2016	Northampton Town (4)	2–2	Milton Keynes Dons (2)	Northampton
15:00 GMT	Holmes 49', 58'	Report	Cresswell 13' (o.g.); Maynard 82'	Stadium: Sixfields Stadium; Attendance: 5,878; Referee: Darren Drysdale

19 January 2016 Replay	Milton Keynes Dons (2)	3–0	Northampton Town (4)	Milton Keynes
19:45 GMT	Reeves 53' (pen.); Murphy 61'; Church 89' (pen.)	Report		Stadium: Stadium mk Attendance: 15,133; Referee: Tony Harrington

9 January 2016	Arsenal (1)	3–1	Sunderland (1)	London
15:00 GMT	Campbell 25'; Ramsey 72'; Giroud 75'	Report	Lens 17'	Stadium: Emirates Stadium; Attendance: 59,349; Referee: Martin Atkinson

9 January 2016	Ipswich Town (2)	2–2	Portsmouth (4)	Ipswich
15:00 GMT	Oar 53'; Fraser 88'	Report	Bennett 55'; Chaplin 86'	Stadium: Portman Road; Attendance: 17,020; Referee: David Coote

19 January 2016 Replay	Portsmouth (4)	2–1	Ipswich Town (2)	Portsmouth
19:45 GMT	Roberts 32' (pen.); McNulty 37'	Report	Maitland-Niles 60'	Stadium: Fratton Park; Attendance: 15,179; Referee: Andy Woolmer

9 January 2016	Birmingham City (2)	1–2	Bournemouth (1)	Birmingham
15:00 GMT	Morrison 40'	Report	Tomlin 44' (pen.); Murray 85'	Stadium: St. Andrew's; Attendance: 13,140; Referee: Mike Jones

9 January 2016	Sheffield Wednesday (2)	2–1	Fulham (2)	Sheffield
15:00 GMT	Bannan 42'; Nuhiu 73'	Report	Dembélé 43'	Stadium: Hillsborough Stadium; Attendance: 15,244; Referee: Gavin Ward

9 January 2016	Brentford (2)	0–1	Walsall (3)	London
15:00 GMT		Report	Mantom 34'	Stadium: Griffin Park; Attendance: 7,950; Referee: Andy Davies

9 January 2016	Bury (3)	0–0	Bradford City (3)	Bury
15:00 GMT		Report		Stadium: Gigg Lane; Attendance: 6,962; Referee: Rob Lewis

19 January 2016 Replay	Bradford City (3)	0–0 (a.e.t.) (2–4 p)	Bury (3)	Bradford
19:45 GMT		Report		Stadium: Valley Parade; Attendance: 6,227; Referee: Geoff Eltringham
	Penalties
	McMahon (penalty scored); Davies (penalty missed); Evans (penalty scored); Cole (penalty missed)		(penalty scored) Tutte; (penalty scored) Lowe; (penalty scored) Clarke; (penalty scored) Mellis

9 January 2016	Everton (1)	2–0	Dagenham & Redbridge (4)	Liverpool
15:00 GMT	Koné 32'; Mirallas 85' (pen.)	Report		Stadium: Goodison Park; Attendance: 30,918; Referee: Paul Tierney

9 January 2016	Southampton (1)	1–2	Crystal Palace (1)	Southampton
15:00 GMT	Romeu 51'	Report	Ward 29'; Zaha 68'	Stadium: St Mary's Stadium; Attendance: 30,763; Referee: Lee Mason

9 January 2016	Eastleigh (5)	1–1	Bolton Wanderers (2)	Eastleigh
15:00 GMT	Dervite 51' (o.g.)	Report	Pratley 87'	Stadium: Ten Acres; Attendance: 5,250; Referee: Iain Williamson

19 January 2016 Replay	Bolton Wanderers (2)	3–2	Eastleigh (5)	Bolton
20:00 GMT	Madine 39'; Moxey 43'; Pratley 58'	Report	Partington 11'; Mohamed 45+2'	Stadium: Macron Stadium; Attendance: 8,287; Referee: Mark Clattenburg

9 January 2016	Nottingham Forest (2)	1–0	Queens Park Rangers (2)	West Bridgford
15:00 GMT	Ward 24'	Report		Stadium: City Ground; Attendance: 14,197; Referee: Oliver Langford

9 January 2016	Doncaster Rovers (3)	1–2	Stoke City (1)	Doncaster
15:00 GMT	Tyson 25'	Report	Crouch 15'; Walters 57'	Stadium: Keepmoat Stadium; Attendance: 13,299; Referee: Keith Stroud

9 January 2016	Leeds United (2)	2–0	Rotherham United (2)	Leeds
15:00 GMT	Carayol 45'; Doukara 90'	Report		Stadium: Elland Road; Attendance: 16,039; Referee: Andy Woolmer

9 January 2016	Huddersfield Town (2)	2–2	Reading (2)	Huddersfield
15:00 GMT	Paterson 57'; Wells 90+2' (pen.)	Report	Vydra 71'; Robson-Kanu 87'	Stadium: John Smith's Stadium; Attendance: 9,236; Referee: Jeremy Simpson

19 January 2016 Replay	Reading (2)	5–2	Huddersfield Town (2)	Reading
20:00 GMT	Piazon 29'; Vydra 57', 61', 90'; Fernández 90+3'	Report	Paterson 8'; Smith 15'	Stadium: Madejski Stadium; Attendance: 8,119; Referee: Oliver Langford

9 January 2016	Middlesbrough (2)	1–2	Burnley (2)	Middlesbrough
15:00 GMT	Fabbrini 36'	Report	Hennings 45'; Ward 71'	Stadium: Riverside Stadium; Attendance: 18,286; Referee: Simon Hooper

9 January 2016	Norwich City (1)	0–3	Manchester City (1)	Norwich
15:00 GMT		Report	Agüero 16'; Iheanacho 31'; De Bruyne 78'	Stadium: Carrow Road; Attendance: 24,507; Referee: Mike Dean

9 January 2016	Hull City (2)	1–0	Brighton & Hove Albion (2)	Kingston upon Hull
15:00 GMT	Snodgrass 41' (pen.)	Report		Stadium: KC Stadium; Attendance: 10,706; Referee: Geoff Eltringham

9 January 2016	Manchester United (1)	1–0	Sheffield United (3)	Old Trafford, Greater Manchester
17:30 GMT	Rooney 90+3' (pen.)	Report		Stadium: Old Trafford; Attendance: 74,284; Referee: Jon Moss

10 January 2016	Oxford United (4)	3–2	Swansea City (1)	Oxford
12:00 GMT	Sercombe 45' (pen.); Roofe 49', 59'	Report	Montero 23'; Gomis 66'	Stadium: Kassam Stadium; Attendance: 11,673; Referee: Kevin Friend

10 January 2016	Carlisle United (4)	2–2	Yeovil Town (4)	Blackpool
14:00 GMT	Grainger 25'; Ellis 76'	Report	Zoko 71'; Jeffers 90+3'	Stadium: Bloomfield Road; Attendance: 3,357; Referee: Andrew Madley

19 January 2016 Replay	Yeovil Town (4)	1–1 (a.e.t.) (4–5 p)	Carlisle United (4)	Yeovil
19:45 GMT	Compton 31'	Report	Sweeney 77'	Stadium: Huish Park; Attendance: 4,114; Referee: Tim Robinson
	Penalties
	Dickson (penalty scored); Jeffers (penalty scored); Tozer (penalty scored); Dawson (penalty scored); Dolan (penalty missed)		(penalty scored) Kennedy; (penalty scored) Sweeney; (penalty scored) Wyke; (penalty scored) Ibehre; (penalty scored) Ellis

10 January 2016	Chelsea (1)	2–0	Scunthorpe United (3)	London
14:00 GMT	Costa 13'; Loftus-Cheek 68'	Report		Stadium: Stamford Bridge; Attendance: 41,625; Referee: Craig Pawson

10 January 2016	Tottenham Hotspur (1)	2–2	Leicester City (1)	London
16:00 GMT	Eriksen 8'; Kane 89' (pen.)	Report	Wasilewski 19'; Okazaki 48'	Stadium: White Hart Lane; Attendance: 35,805; Referee: Bobby Madley

20 January 2016 Replay	Leicester City (1)	0–2	Tottenham Hotspur (1)	Leicester
19:45 GMT		Report	Son Heung-min 39'; Chadli 66'	Stadium: King Power Stadium; Attendance: 30,006; Referee: Anthony Taylor

10 January 2016	Cardiff City (2)	0–1	Shrewsbury Town (3)	Cardiff
18:00 GMT		Report	Mangan 62'	Stadium: Cardiff City Stadium; Attendance: 4,782; Referee: Peter Bankes

18 January 2016 (Note: The match on 9 January 2016 between Newport County and Blackburn Rovers was postponed due to a waterlogged pitch. The match was later rearranged for 18 January 2016.)	Newport County (4)	1–2	Blackburn Rovers (2)	Newport
19:15 GMT	Byrne 30'	Report	Marshall 8' (pen.); Rhodes 75'	Stadium: Rodney Parade; Attendance: 5,083; Referee: Charles Breakspear

== Fourth round proper ==
The draw for the fourth round proper was held on 11 January 2016. The fourth round proper was played across the weekend of 30 January 2016.

The three lowest ranked teams in this round were Oxford United, Portsmouth and Carlisle United, who competed in League Two (tier 4).

29 January 2016	Derby County (2)	1–3	Manchester United (1)	Derby
19:55 GMT	Thorne 37'	Report	Rooney 16'; Blind 65'; Mata 83'	Stadium: Pride Park Stadium; Attendance: 31,134; Referee: Anthony Taylor

30 January 2016	Colchester United (3)	1–4	Tottenham Hotspur (1)	Colchester
12:45 GMT	Davies 80' (o.g.)	Report	Chadli 27', 78'; Dier 64'; Carroll 82'	Stadium: Colchester Community Stadium; Attendance: 9,920; Referee: Michael Oliver

30 January 2016	West Bromwich Albion (1)	2–2	Peterborough United (3)	West Bromwich
15:00 GMT	Berahino 14', 84'	Report	Coulthirst 79'; Taylor 86'	Stadium: The Hawthorns; Attendance: 22,517; Referee: Kevin Friend

10 February 2016 Replay	Peterborough United (3)	1–1 (a.e.t.) (3–4 p)	West Bromwich Albion (1)	Peterborough
19:45 GMT	Taylor 55'	Report	Fletcher 71'	Stadium: London Road Stadium; Attendance: 10,632; Referee: Mike Jones
	Penalties
	Bostwick (penalty scored); Maddison (penalty scored); Samuelsen (penalty missed); Fox (penalty scored); Angol (penalty missed)		(penalty scored) Pocognoli; (penalty scored) Berahino; (penalty scored) Gardner; (penalty missed) Fletcher; (penalty scored) Chester

30 January 2016	Bolton Wanderers (2)	1–2	Leeds United (2)	Bolton
15:00 GMT	Pratley 80'	Report	Doukara 8'; Diagouraga 39'	Stadium: Macron Stadium; Attendance: 17,336; Referee: Andre Marriner

30 January 2016	Arsenal (1)	2–1	Burnley (2)	London
15:00 GMT	Chambers 19'; Sánchez 53'	Report	Vokes 30'	Stadium: Emirates Stadium; Attendance: 59,932; Referee: Roger East

30 January 2016	Reading (2)	4–0	Walsall (3)	Reading
15:00 GMT	Robson-Kanu 37'; Vydra 40', 89'; Williams 75'	Report		Stadium: Madejski Stadium; Attendance: 13,367; Referee: Peter Bankes

30 January 2016	Aston Villa (1)	0–4	Manchester City (1)	Birmingham
15:00 GMT		Report	Iheanacho 4', 24' (pen.), 74'; Sterling 76'	Stadium: Villa Park; Attendance: 23,636; Referee: Mike Jones

30 January 2016	Shrewsbury Town (3)	3–2	Sheffield Wednesday (2)	Shrewsbury
15:00 GMT	Akpa Akpro 56'; Whalley 87'; Grimmer 90+7'	Report	McGugan 19', 76'	Stadium: New Meadow; Attendance: 5,699; Referee: Paul Tierney

30 January 2016	Nottingham Forest (2)	0–1	Watford (1)	West Bridgford
15:00 GMT		Report	Ighalo 89'	Stadium: City Ground; Attendance: 24,703; Referee: Neil Swarbrick

30 January 2016	Crystal Palace (1)	1–0	Stoke City (1)	London
15:00 GMT	Zaha 17'	Report		Stadium: Selhurst Park; Attendance: 17,062; Referee: Mark Clattenburg

30 January 2016	Oxford United (4)	0–3	Blackburn Rovers (2)	Oxford
15:00 GMT		Report	Marshall 36' (pen.), 76'; Watt 45+2'	Stadium: Kassam Stadium; Attendance: 11,647; Referee: Andy Davies

30 January 2016	Portsmouth (4)	1–2	Bournemouth (1)	Portsmouth
15:00 GMT	Roberts 43'	Report	King 71'; Pugh 83'	Stadium: Fratton Park; Attendance: 18,901; Referee: Mike Dean

30 January 2016	Bury (3)	1–3	Hull City (2)	Bury
15:00 GMT	Jones 86'	Report	Akpom 14', 57' (pen.), 69'	Stadium: Gigg Lane; Attendance: 7,064; Referee: Darren Bond

30 January 2016	Liverpool (1)	0–0	West Ham United (1)	Liverpool
17:30 GMT		Report		Stadium: Anfield; Attendance: 44,006; Referee: Martin Atkinson

9 February 2016 Replay	West Ham United (1)	2–1 (a.e.t.)	Liverpool (1)	London
19:45 GMT	Antonio 45'; Ogbonna 120+1'	Report	Coutinho 48'	Stadium: Boleyn Ground; Attendance: 34,433; Referee: Roger East

31 January 2016	Carlisle United (4)	0–3	Everton (1)	Carlisle
13:30 GMT		Report	Koné 2'; Lennon 14'; Barkley 65'	Stadium: Brunton Park; Attendance: 17,101; Referee: Lee Mason

31 January 2016	Milton Keynes Dons (2)	1–5	Chelsea (1)	Milton Keynes
16:00 GMT	Potter 21'	Report	Oscar 15', 32', 44'; Hazard 55' (pen.); Traoré 62'	Stadium: Stadium mk Attendance: 28,172; Referee: Jon Moss

== Fifth round proper ==
The draw for the fifth round proper was held on 31 January 2016. The fifth round proper was played across the weekend of 20 February 2016.

The lowest ranked club in this round was Shrewsbury Town, who competed in League One (tier 3).

20 February 2016	Arsenal (1)	0–0	Hull City (2)	London
12:45 GMT		Report		Stadium: Emirates Stadium; Attendance: 59,830; Referee: Mike Dean

8 March 2016 Replay	Hull City (2)	0–4	Arsenal (1)	Kingston upon Hull
19:00 GMT		Report	Giroud 41', 71'; Walcott 77', 89'	Stadium: KC Stadium; Attendance: 20,993; Referee: Mike Jones

20 February 2016	Reading (2)	3–1	West Bromwich Albion (1)	Reading
15:00 GMT	McShane 59'; Hector 72'; Piazon 90+4'	Report	Fletcher 54'	Stadium: Madejski Stadium; Attendance: 19,566; Referee: Anthony Taylor

20 February 2016	Watford (1)	1–0	Leeds United (2)	Watford
15:00 GMT	Wootton 53' (o.g.)	Report		Stadium: Vicarage Road; Attendance: 18,336; Referee: Michael Oliver

20 February 2016	Bournemouth (1)	0–2	Everton (1)	Bournemouth
17:15 GMT		Report	Barkley 55'; Lukaku 76'	Stadium: Dean Court; Attendance: 11,404; Referee: Martin Atkinson

21 February 2016	Blackburn Rovers (2)	1–5	West Ham United (1)	Blackburn
14:00 GMT	Marshall 20'	Report	Moses 26'; Payet 36', 90+2'; Emenike 64', 85'	Stadium: Ewood Park; Attendance: 18,793; Referee: Jon Moss

21 February 2016	Tottenham Hotspur (1)	0–1	Crystal Palace (1)	London
15:00 GMT		Report	Kelly 45+1'	Stadium: White Hart Lane; Attendance: 35,547; Referee: Craig Pawson

21 February 2016	Chelsea (1)	5–1	Manchester City (1)	London
16:00 GMT	Costa 35'; Willian 48'; Cahill 53'; Hazard 67'; Traoré 89'	Report	Faupala 37'	Stadium: Stamford Bridge; Attendance: 41,594; Referee: Andre Marriner

22 February 2016	Shrewsbury Town (3)	0–3	Manchester United (1)	Shrewsbury
19:45 GMT		Report	Smalling 37'; Mata 45'; Lingard 61'	Stadium: New Meadow; Attendance: 9,370; Referee: Bobby Madley

== Sixth round proper ==
The draw for the sixth round proper (Quarter-finals) was held on 21 February 2016. The sixth round proper was played across the weekend of 12 March 2016. This marked the final year where the sixth round would go into a replay if teams were tied.

The lowest ranked club remaining in this round was Reading, who competed in the League Championship (tier 2).

11 March 2016	Reading (2)	0–2	Crystal Palace (1)	Reading
19:55 GMT		Report	Cabaye 86' (pen.); Campbell 90+4'	Stadium: Madejski Stadium; Attendance: 23,110; Referee: Mike Dean

12 March 2016	Everton (1)	2–0	Chelsea (1)	Liverpool
17:30 GMT	Lukaku 77', 82'	Report		Stadium: Goodison Park; Attendance: 37,283; Referee: Michael Oliver

13 March 2016	Arsenal (1)	1–2	Watford (1)	London
13:30 GMT	Welbeck 88'	Report	Ighalo 50'; Guedioura 63'	Stadium: Emirates Stadium; Attendance: 58,436; Referee: Andre Marriner

13 March 2016	Manchester United (1)	1–1	West Ham United (1)	Old Trafford, Greater Manchester
16:00 GMT	Martial 83'	Report	Payet 68'	Stadium: Old Trafford; Attendance: 74,298; Referee: Martin Atkinson

13 April 2016 Replay	West Ham United (1)	1–2	Manchester United (1)	London
19:00 BST	Tomkins 79'	Report	Rashford 54'; Fellaini 67'	Stadium: Boleyn Ground; Attendance: 33,505; Referee: Roger East

== Semi-finals ==
The draw for the semi-finals was held on 14 March 2016. The semi-finals were played on 23 and 24 April 2016.

23 April 2016	Everton (1)	1–2	Manchester United (1)	Wembley Stadium, London
17:15 BST	Smalling 75' (o.g.)	Report	Fellaini 34'; Martial 90+3'	Attendance: 86,064; Referee: Anthony Taylor

24 April 2016	Crystal Palace (1)	2–1	Watford (1)	Wembley Stadium, London
16:00 BST	Bolasie 6'; Wickham 61'	Report	Deeney 55'	Attendance: 79,110; Referee: Craig Pawson

== Final ==
The final took place on 21 May 2016 at Wembley Stadium.

21 May 2016
17:30 BST

Crystal Palace	1–2 (a.e.t.)	Manchester United
Puncheon 78'	Report, Statistics	Mata 81'; Lingard 110'

Wembley Stadium, London
Attendance: 88,619
Referee: Mark Clattenburg (County Durham)

== Top goalscorers ==
Rank	Player	Club	Goals
1	(Czech Republic) Matěj Vydra	Reading	6
2	(Zimbabwe) Macauley Bonne	Colchester United	4
2	(Nigeria) Kelechi Iheanacho	Manchester City	4
2	(England) Ben Marshall	Blackburn Rovers	4
2	(Northern Ireland) Conor Washington	Peterborough United	4

== Broadcasting rights ==
The domestic broadcasting rights for the competition were held by the BBC and subscription channel BT Sport. The BBC held the rights since 2014–15, while BT Sport since 2013–14. The FA Cup Final was required to be broadcast live on UK terrestrial television under the Ofcom code of protected sporting events.

The following matches were broadcast live on UK television:

Round	Date	Teams	Kick-off	Channels	
Round	Date	Teams	Kick-off	Digital	TV
First round	6 November	Salford City v Notts County	7:55pm	BBC iPlayer	BBC Two
First round	8 November	Didcot Town v Exeter City	12:00pm	BT Sport App	BT Sport 2
First round	9 November	F.C. United of Manchester v Chesterfield	7:45pm	BT Sport App	BT Sport 2
First round (Replay)	18 November	Bradford City v Aldershot Town	7:45pm	BT Sport App	BT Sport 2
First round (Replay)	19 November	Maidenhead United v Port Vale	7:45pm	BT Sport App	BT Sport 2
Second round	4 December	Salford City v Hartlepool United	7:55pm	BBC iPlayer	BBC Two
Second round	6 December	Rochdale v Bury	12:00pm	BT Sport App	BT Sport 2
Second round	7 December	Grimsby Town v Shrewsbury Town	7:45pm	BT Sport App	BT Sport 2
Second round (Replay)	15 December	Hartlepool United v Salford City	7:45pm	BT Sport App	BT Sport 2
Second round (Replay)	16 December	Whitehawk v Dagenham & Redbridge	7:45pm	BT Sport App	BT Sport 2
Third round	8 January	Exeter City v Liverpool	7:55pm	BBC iPlayer	BBC One
Third round	9 January	Wycombe Wanderers v Aston Villa	12:45pm	BT Sport App	BT Sport 2
Third round	9 January	~~Newport County v Blackburn Rovers~~	~~3:00pm~~	~~S4C Clic~~	~~S4C~~
Third round	9 January	Manchester United v Sheffield United	5:30pm	BT Sport App	BT Sport 2
Third round	10 January	Oxford United v Swansea City	12:00pm	BBC iPlayer	BBC Two Wales
Third round	10 January	Chelsea v Scunthorpe United	2:00pm	BT Sport App	BT Sport 2
Third round	10 January	Tottenham Hotspur v Leicester City	4:00pm	BBC iPlayer	BBC One
Third round	10 January	Cardiff City v Shrewsbury Town	6:00pm	S4C Clic	S4C
Third round	18 January	Newport County v Blackburn Rovers	7:15pm	S4C Clic	S4C
Third round (Replay)	19 January	Bristol City v West Bromwich Albion	7:45pm	BT Sport App	BT Sport 2
Third round (Replay)	20 January	Leicester City v Tottenham Hotspur	7:45pm	BBC iPlayer	BBC One
Third round (Replay)	20 January	Liverpool v Exeter City	8:00pm	BT Sport App	BT Sport 2
Fourth round	29 January	Derby County v Manchester United	7:55pm	BBC iPlayer	BBC One
Fourth round	30 January	Colchester United v Tottenham Hotspur	12:45pm	BT Sport App	BT Sport 2
Fourth round	30 January	Liverpool v West Ham United	5:30pm	BT Sport App	BT Sport 2
Fourth round	31 January	Carlisle United v Everton	1:30pm	BT Sport App	BT Sport 2
Fourth round	31 January	Milton Keynes Dons v Chelsea	4:00pm	BBC iPlayer	BBC One
Fourth round (Replay)	9 February	West Ham United v Liverpool	7:45pm	BT Sport App	BT Sport 2
Fourth round (Replay)	10 February	Peterborough United v West Bromwich Albion	7:45pm	BBC iPlayer	BBC One
Fifth round	20 February	Arsenal v Hull City	12:45pm	BT Sport App	BT Sport 2
Fifth round	20 February	Bournemouth v Everton	5:15pm	BBC iPlayer	BBC One
Fifth round	21 February	Blackburn Rovers v West Ham United	2:00pm	BT Sport App	BT Sport 2
Fifth round	21 February	Chelsea v Manchester City	4:00pm	BBC iPlayer	BBC One
Fifth round	22 February	Shrewsbury Town v Manchester United	7:45pm	BT Sport App	BT Sport 2
Fifth round (Replay)	8 March	Hull City v Arsenal	7:00pm	BT Sport App	BT Sport 2
Sixth round	11 March	Reading v Crystal Palace	7:55pm	BBC iPlayer	BBC One
Sixth round	12 March	Everton v Chelsea	5:30pm	BBC iPlayer	BBC One
Sixth round	13 March	Arsenal v Watford	1:30pm	BT Sport App	BT Sport 2
Sixth round	13 March	Manchester United v West Ham United	4:00pm	BT Sport App	BT Sport 2
Sixth round (Replay)	13 April	West Ham United v Manchester United	7:00pm	BBC iPlayer	BBC One
Semi-finals	23 April	Everton v Manchester United	5:15pm	BBC iPlayer	BBC One
Semi-finals	24 April	Crystal Palace v Watford	4:00pm	BT Sport App	BT Sport 2
Final	May 21	Crystal Palace v Manchester United	5:30pm	BBC iPlayer	BBC One
Final	May 21	Crystal Palace v Manchester United	5:30pm	BT Sport App	BT Sport 2

Welsh language channel S4C broadcast the third-round match between Cardiff City and Shrewsbury Town, and also broadcast the rescheduled third-round match between Newport County and Blackburn Rovers.
