= Malden Town F.C. =

Malden Town
- Full name: Malden Town Football Club
- Founded: prior to 1931
- Dissolved: 1992
- 1991–92: Combined Counties League, 2nd of 19

Malden Town Football Club was a football club based in New Malden, Greater London, England. The club played at Combined Counties Football League level, winning the title in 1980–81, and featured in the FA Cup and FA Vase.

== History ==
Playing in the Wimbledon & District League as Alpha F.C. in the early 1930s, the club switched to the Kingston and District League in 1935–36. Around the same time the club was renamed Malden F.C.

After World War II, as Malden Town, the club was again a member of the Wimbledon & District League before joining the Surrey Senior League in 1950. They won the league in 1958-59 and 1970–71, and finished in the top five every season between 1964 and 1978.

Joining the Combined Counties Football League on its inception in 1978, they won the league in 1980–81. When the league was split into two sections the following season, they won the Eastern Section, losing the playoff 3–0 on aggregate to Western Section winners Ash United. They were runners-up in 1983–84 and also in their final season 1991–92, after which the club folded.

Malden Town participated in the FA Cup during the late 1960s, reaching the third qualifying round in 1968–69 when they lost 4–0 at Walton & Hersham. They competed in the FA Vase during the 1970s and 1980s, their best performance coming in 1982–83, when they were beaten 3–1 at Burnham in the second round.

== Honours ==
=== League ===
Combined Counties Football League

- Winners: 1980–81

== Records ==
- FA Cup best performance: Third qualifying round, 1968–69
- FA Vase best performance: Second round, 1982–83
