= Worplesdon Phoenix F.C. =

Association football club in England

Worplesdon Phoenix
- Full name: Worplesdon Phoenix Football Club
- Founded: 1919 (as Worplesdon F.C.)
- Ground: Worplesdon Memorial Ground
- League: Surrey Intermediate League Premier Division
- 2024–25: Surrey Intermediate League Premier Division, 4th of 12
- Website: http://www.pitchero.com/clubs/worplesdonphoenixfc/

Worplesdon Phoenix Football Club is an English football club based in Worplesdon, Surrey. Formerly known as Worplesdon and Guildford & Worplesdon, the club has played at Combined Counties Football League level, and currently plays in the Surrey Intermediate League Premier Division. As Guildford & Worplesdon, they featured in the FA Vase during the early 1980s. The club is a FA chartered Standard club affiliated to the Surrey County Football Association. The club plays its home games at the Worplesdon Memorial Ground.

== History ==
Formed in 1919 as Worplesdon F.C., the club was a founder member of the Woking and District League before joining the Surrey Senior League. After a few unsuccessful seasons in the mid-1970s, the club was renamed Guildford & Worplesdon and became founder members of the Combined Counties Football League, then called the Home Counties League. Finishing sixth in the league's inaugural season, Guildford & Worplesdon won the league in 1979–80. They competed at this level until the end of the 1983–84 season, when they dropped out.

During this period, the club also competed in the FA Vase, their best performance being their last appearance in 1983–84, when they beat Horndean 3–0 in the preliminary round before losing 2–1 at home to Dorking in the first round.

Reverting to the name of Worplesdon F.C., the club has played for many years in the Surrey County Intermediate League (Western), and was relegated to Division One in 2005–06. Subsequently, merging with another local club, Woking Phoenix, the club was renamed Worplesdon Phoenix. They were promoted back to the Premier Division in 2007–08, but were relegated again in 2013–14.

== Ground ==
Worplesdon Phoenix play their home games at Worplesdon Memorial Ground, Worplesdon Road, Worplesdon, Surrey GU3 3RF.

The sports pavilion was rebuilt in 2008 and was opened by former Spurs player David Howells.

== Honours ==
=== League ===
Combined Counties Football League

- Winners (1): 1979–80 (as Guildford & Worplesdon)

Surrey County Intermediate League (Western) Division One

- Winners (1): 2007–08

Guildford & Woking Alliance

Winners Division one 2018 - 2019

== Records ==
- FA Vase best performance: First round 1983–84
