= Farnham Town F.C. =

English football club

Coordinates: 51°12′41″N 0°48′23″W

Farnham Town
- Full name: Farnham Town Football Club
- Nickname: Town
- Founded: 1906
- Ground: The Memorial Ground, Farnham
- Capacity: 2,200
- Chairman: Harry Hugo
- Manager: Paul Johnson
- League: National League South
- 2025–26: Southern League Premier Division South, 2nd of 22 (promoted via play-offs)
Home colours	Away colours	Third colours

Farnham Town Football Club is a semi-professional football club based in Farnham, Surrey, England. They are currently members of the National League South and play at the Memorial Ground.

== History ==
The club was established in 1906 as a merger of Farnham Bungs and Farnham Star. They became members of the Surrey Intermediate League, and were champions in 1929–30 and 1930–31. The club won the Surrey Junior Cup in 1945–46, and in 1947 they joined the Surrey Senior League. In 1962 they left the league, but they returned in 1963. They went on to win three successive league titles in 1965–66, 1966–67 and 1967–68 and were runners-up in 1969–70 and 1970–71, before joining the Spartan League in 1971. When the league merged with the Metropolitan–London League to form the London Spartan League in 1975, the club were placed in Division One, which became the Premier Division in 1977.

After finishing bottom of the London Spartan Premier Division in 1979–80, Farnham transferred to the Combined Counties League. The 1981–82 season saw them play in the Western Division as the league was temporarily split into two divisions, before reverting to a single division the following season. They were runners-up in 1986–87 and went on to win the league in 1990–91. The following season saw them retain the league title, as well as winning the Premier Challenge Cup and the Elite Cup. They were subsequently promoted to Division Three of the Isthmian League but resigned from the league prior to the start of the 1992–93 season as they were unable to raise the money needed to upgrade the Memorial Ground and were too late to rejoin the Combined Counties League until the following season.

Farnham won the Premier Challenge Cup for a second time in 1995–96. When the Combined Counties League gained a second division in 2003, they became members of the Premier Division. However, they were relegated to Division One after finishing bottom of the Premier Division in 2005–06. They won Division One at the first attempt, but were not promoted due to ground grading issues, and remained in the division until they finished as runners-up in 2010–11, after which they were promoted back to the Premier Division. The club won the Challenge Cup again in 2015–16. In 2017–18 they finished bottom of the Premier Division and were relegated to Division One. In 2021 the club were promoted to the Premier Division South based on their results in the abandoned 2019–20 and 2020–21 seasons. In 2022–23 they won the Southern Combination Challenge Cup, defeating Balham 3–2 after extra time in the final.

The 2023–24 season saw Farnham Town win their first 25 league matches of the season, a national record. They went on to win the Premier Division South title without losing a match, earning promotion to the South Central Division of the Isthmian League. The following season the club were South Central Division champions, resulting in promotion to the Premier Division South of the Southern League. A third successive promotion was achieved in 2025–26 when they finished second in the Premier Division South, and went on to win the promotion play-offs, beating Berkhamsted 2–1 in the semi-final and then winning 5–1 against Gloucester City in the final, securing promotion to the National League South. The season also saw them win the Surrey Senior Cup, defeating Merstham on penalties in the final.

== Ground ==
The club plays at the Memorial Ground, which was originally home to Farnham United Breweries before being gifted to the town in 1947; it was named in memory of five Farnham United Breweries workers who were killed during World War I. A new 170-seat stand was opened in 2023, with a new 210-capacity stand being opened the following year.

In April 2025 it was announced that the club had gained permission to build a new 700-capacity stand. The new partially-covered terrace increased the Memorial Ground's capacity from 1,500 to 2,200.

== Rivalries ==
The club contest the "Coxbridge Derby" with Badshot Lea.

== Current squad ==
As of 20 November 2026

Note: Flags indicate national team as defined under FIFA eligibility rules; some limited exceptions apply. Players may hold more than one non-FIFA nationality.

No.	Pos.	Nation	Player
1	GK	ENG	Michael Eacott
2	DF	ENG	Jack Dean (vice-captain)
3	DF	ENG	Brandon Mason
4	DF	ENG	Dan Bayliss
5	DF	ENG	Ryan Kinnane (captain)
6	DF	WAL	Tom Leggett
7	FW	ENG	George Alexander
8	MF	ENG	Jack Spong
10	MF	ENG	Darryl Sanders
11	FW	ENG	Trae Cook-Appiah
12	MF	ENG	Keane Anderson
13	GK	ENG	James Shaw

No.	Pos.	Nation	Player
14	FW	ENG	Rakish Bingham
16	MF	ENG	Bobby-Joe Taylor
17	MF	ENG	Dan Pybus
18	MF	ENG	Billy Clifford
19	FW	ENG	Miles Obodo
20	MF	ENG	Aaron Kuhl
21	MF	ENG	Mat Mackenzie
23	DF	ENG	Louie Holzman
24	DF	ENG	Marcel Lavinier
25	DF	ENG	Aaron Williams Fernandez
27	MF	ENG	Sam Hutchinson
29	FW	ENG	Jordan Alves

=== Out on loan ===
Note: Flags indicate national team as defined under FIFA eligibility rules; some limited exceptions apply. Players may hold more than one non-FIFA nationality.

No.	Pos.	Nation	Player
22	DF	ENG	Kai Tanner (at Bracknell Town until 17 January 2027)
33	DF	ENG	Quinn Schutter (at Ascot United until 5 December 2026)

No.	Pos.	Nation	Player
36	MF	ENG	Harley Platel (at Bracknell Town until 16 January 2027)

== Management team ==
Position	Staff
Manager	Paul Johnson
Assistant Manager	Jimmy Hibburt
Lead First Team Coach	Sam Hawkins
Head of Performance & Nutrition	David Givens
First Team Coach	Paul Barry
Goalkeeping Coach	Garreth Newton
Kitman	Stuart Puttock
Physiotherapist	Claire Benton

Source: Farnham Town F.C.

== Honours ==
- Isthmian League
  - South Central Division champions 2024–25
- Combined Counties League
  - Premier Division champions 1990–91, 1991–92
  - Premier Division South champions 2023–24
  - Division One champions 2006–07
  - Challenge Cup winners 1991–92, 1995–96, 2015–16
  - Elite Cup winners 1991–92
- Surrey Senior League
  - Champions 1965–66, 1966–67, 1967–68
- Surrey Intermediate League
  - Champions 1929–30, 1930–31
- Surrey Senior Cup
  - Winners 2025–26
- Surrey Junior Cup
  - Winners 1945–46
- Southern Combination Challenge Cup
  - Winners 2022–23

== Records ==
- Best FA Cup performance: Fourth qualifying round, 2025–26
- Best FA Trophy performance: Second round, 2025–26, 2026–27
- Best FA Vase performance: Fourth round, 1976–77, 2023–24
- Record attendance: 2,300 vs Sutton United, FA Cup fourth qualifying round, 11 October 2025

== See also ==
- Farnham Town F.C. players
