= Godalming Town F.C. =

English football club

Coordinates: 51°11′42″N 0°35′51″W

Godalming Town
- Full name: Godalming Town Football Club
- Nickname: The G's
- Founded: 1950 (as Godalming United)
- Ground: Bill Kyte Stadium, Godalming
- Capacity: 3,000 (200 seated)
- Chairman: Matthew Clay
- Manager: Sam Morgan
- League: Combined Counties League Premier Division South
- 2025–26: Southern Combination Division One, 1st of 18 (promoted)
Home colours	Away colours

Godalming Town Football Club is a semi-professional football club based in Godalming, Surrey, England. They are currently members of the Combined Counties League Premier Division South and play at the Bill Kyte Stadium.

== History ==
The club was established in 1950 as Godalming United by former pupils of Godalming Grammar School. When Godalming & Farncombe United folded in 1970, the club moved to their Weycourt ground and were renamed Godalming & Farncombe. In 1979 they joined the Combined Counties League, and in 1980 were renamed Godalming Town. League restructuring saw them placed in the Eastern Division of the league for the 1981–82 season, with the league reverting to a single division in 1982. In 1982–83 they won the league's Concours Challenge Trophy, and in 1983–84 the club were league champions.

In 1992 the club was renamed Godalming & Guildford, after the Guildford Football Appeal donated money for a set of floodlights. However, they changed back to Godalming Town in 2005. In 2005–06 they won the Combined Counties League and the league's Premier Challenge Cup, earning promotion to Division One South of the Isthmian League. Although they finished bottom of the division in the following season, they were reprieved from relegation and instead transferred to Division One South & West of the Southern League. At the end of the 2007–08 season the club were moved back to Division One South of the Isthmian League.

A fourth-place finish in 2009–10 saw Godalming qualify for the promotion play-offs. However, after defeating Worthing 2–1 in the semi-finals, they were beaten 2–1 in the final by Folkestone Invicta. They also won the Surrey Senior Cup, beating Sutton United 2–1 in the final. In 2011–12 the club finished fifth, losing 5–3 on penalties to Bognor Regis Town in the play-off semi-finals following a 4–4 draw. They were transferred to Division One Central of the Southern League for the following season, and a third-place finish resulted in another play-off campaign, this time losing 2–1 to Biggleswade Town in the semi-finals. The club also won the Surrey Senior Cup for a second time, again beating Sutton United in the final. They were subsequently transferred to Division One South & West for the 2013–14 season, then back to Division One Central in 2014, before returning to Division One South of the Isthmian League for the 2016–17 season. After finishing bottom of the table, they were relegated to the Premier Division of the Combined Counties League.

At the end of the 2020–21 season Godalming were transferred to Division One of the Southern Combination League. They were Division One champions in 2025–26 and were promoted to Premier Division South of the Combined Counties League.

== Ground ==
Bill Kyte Stadium, the club's home ground

Godalming initially played at the Recreation Ground, before moving to the Weycourt ground, taking over the tenancy from Farncombe. Improvement works at the site included moving the pitch to the site of a former rubbish tip. During the works, the club temporarily played at Broadwater Park. In 1985 the main stand from Addlestone & Weybridge Town's Liberty Lane ground was purchased for £225 after the club folded. The ground was renamed the Bill Kyte Stadium in 2018 in honour of a former president.

== Honours ==
- Combined Counties League
  - Champions 1983–84, 2005–06
  - Premier Challenge Cup winners 2005–06
  - Concours Challenge Trophy winners 1982–83
- Southern Combination
  - Division One champions 2025–26
- Surrey Senior Cup
  - Winners 2009–10, 2012–13

== Records ==
- Best FA Cup performance: Fourth qualifying round, 2011–12
- Best FA Trophy performance: Third qualifying round, 2009–10
- Best FA Vase performance: 2nd round, 1987–88, 1993–94, 1995–96
- Record attendance: 1,305 vs AFC Wimbledon, 2002
- Most appearances: James Mariner, over 500

== See also ==
- Godalming Town F.C. players
