= Hartley Wintney F.C. =

Association football club in England

Coordinates: 51°18′4″N 0°54′23″W

Hartley Wintney
- Full name: Hartley Wintney Football Club
- Nickname: The Row
- Founded: 1897
- Ground: The Memorial Playing Fields, Hartley Wintney
- Capacity: 2,000 (113 seated)
- Chairman: Luke Mullen
- Manager: John Cook and Jamie Daltrey
- League: Isthmian League South Central Division
- 2025–26: Isthmian League South Central Division, 12th of 22
- Website: http://www.hartleyfc.com
Home colours	Away colours

Hartley Wintney Football Club is a semi-professional football club based in the village of Hartley Wintney, Hampshire, England. They are currently members of the Isthmian League South Central Division and play at the Memorial Playing Fields. The club nickname of 'the Row' is because Hartley Row was a hamlet since subsumed by the spread of Hartley Wintney itself.

== History ==
The club was established in 1897. They played in the Basingstoke & District League before transferring to the Aldershot & District League, where the club won three consecutive league titles in the mid-1970s. In 1978 Hartley Wintney were founder members of the Home Counties League, which was renamed the Combined Counties League in 1979. They were runners-up in 1980–81, and were placed in the Western Division when the league was separated into two sections in 1981–82. When the league reverted to a single division in 1982–83, the club were league champions. Although they won the league's Challenge Trophy in 1987–88 and again in 1989–90, the team went into decline and finished second-from-bottom of the league twice in successive seasons in 1998–99 and 1999–2000.

When the league gained a second division in 2003, Hartley Wintney were placed in the Premier Division. However, they were relegated to Division One at the end of the 2004–05 season after finishing second-from-bottom of the Premier Division. In 2007–08 a third-place finish saw them promoted back to the Premier Division, but they were relegated again at the end of the following season. Another third-place finish in 2011–12 led to the club being promoted back to the Premier Division again. In 2015–16 Hartley Wintney won the Premier Division, but were unable to take promotion to the next level as they were unable to make the necessary improvements to their ground before the deadline. However, they were champions again the following season, and were able to take promotion to the East Division of the Southern League.

In 2017–18 Hartley Wintney finished fourth in the East Division, qualifying for the promotion play-offs. After beating AFC Dunstable 2–0 in the semi-finals, they defeated Cambridge City 1–0 in the final to earn promotion to the Premier South division. The club finished bottom of the Premier Division South in 2022–23 and were relegated to the South Central Division of the Isthmian League.

== Ground ==
The club initially played at Causeway Farm, before moving to their current ground in 1953. Initially known as Green Lane, it later became the Memorial Playing Fields. The ground currently has a capacity of 2,000, of which 113 is seated.

== Honours ==
- Combined Counties League
  - Premier Division champions 1982–83, 2015–16, 2016–17
  - Challenge Trophy winners 1987–88, 1989–90

== Records ==
- Best FA Cup performance: Fourth qualifying round, 2013–14, 2020–21
- Best FA Vase performance: Fifth round, 2015–16
- Record attendance: 1,392 vs AFC Wimbledon, Combined Counties League Premier Division, 25 January 2003

== See also ==
- Hartley Wintney F.C. players
- Hartley Wintney F.C. managers
