= Westfield F.C. (Surrey) =

Association football club in England

Coordinates: 51°18′32″N 0°33′23″W

Westfield
- Full name: Westfield Football Club
- Nicknames: The Field, The Yella
- Founded: 1953
- Ground: Woking Park
- Capacity: 1,500
- Chairman: Steven Perkins
- Manager: Andrew Crossley
- League: Isthmian League South Central Division
- 2025–26: Isthmian League South Central Division, 2nd of 22
Home colours	Away colours

Westfield Football Club is a semi-professional football club based in the Westfield area of Woking, England. The club is affiliated to the Surrey County Football Association. They are currently members of the Isthmian League South Central Division.

== History ==
The club was established in 1953 as Westfield Boys Club and started playing in the local Woking and District Football league. During their time in the local leagues, the club won the Surrey Junior Charity Cup and the Surrey Junior Cup. After a few seasons, the club moved up to the Surrey intermediate leagues.

For the 1962–63 season, the club joined the Parthenon League, now under the name of Westfield and finished runners-up at the first attempt. The following season saw the club join the Surrey Senior League. Their ninth season in the Surrey Senior League, 1972–73, saw the club clinch the league title and complete a double success by winning the league cup. Further success followed the next season as they successfully defended the league title. In April 1974 Dorking FC invited Westfield to play a friendly to inaugurate their new floodlights. Westfield won the match 1 - 0. Not long after Dorking FC merged with Guildford City to form Guildford and Dorking United. The 1974–75 campaign saw the club make their debut in the FA Vase, where they lost to Chertsey Town, and finished bottom of the league; however, they did not suffer relegation back to the intermediate leagues.

In 1978, the club became a founder member of the Home Counties Football League, which was then renamed the Combined Counties Football League the following season. The club remained in the Combined Counties Football league for the next twenty-seven seasons, despite finishing in the bottom three times within this period. They also managed to advance to the Concours Challenge Trophy, but lost out to Hartley Wintney in the final. This period also saw the club enter the FA Cup for the first time when they met Dorking in the extra preliminary qualifying round, but lost 2–1. The 2005–06 campaign saw the club finish in eleventh place, but they were relegated to Division one as their ground did not meet the criteria to remain in the Premier Division.

In 2011–12, the club reached its first cup final for in twenty years when they met Warlingham in the Division One Challenge Cup, but lost 4–2. In 2013, the club's youth team was transferred to the Sturridge Football Academy, owned by Daniel Sturridge and operated in part by Leon Sturridge and Cleveland Clarke. However, as of May 2025, the U18s has been put back in control of the club.

In 2017–18, Tony Reid's side went one better than their runners up position the previous season, after they clinched the Combined Counties Football League title with six games remaining. The Yellows beat local rivals Knaphill 4–1 at Woking Park (12 April 2018) to secure the championship and promotion to step 4 of the National League System for the first time in their history.

2018-19 saw the club finish in 5th place, losing the play-off semi-final to Bracknell Town.

The club remained in contention for promotion to the Isthmian League Premier Division during the 2019–20; however, the season was eventually abandoned due to the coronavirus pandemic, after the UK Government placed all four nations on lockdown from 23 March 2020. This prompted Reid and his assistant Martyn Lee to resign on 15 April 2020, with both seeking new managerial roles within the higher echelons of the non-League football pyramid.

On 16 May 2020, Westfield formally announced the appointment of Simon Lane, who had previously managed at Egham Town, Northwood, Windsor and Eton and Wingate and Finchley. On 9 February 2023, it was announced that Lane had left the Woking Park side to join Kingstonian.

On 25 February 2023, the club announced it had appointed former Arsenal, Fulham and Woking midfielder Ian Selley.

The 2023/24 season proved to be one of great excitement, which saw the club reach the playoffs again, but fell in extra time away to Marlow.

A week later the club lifted the Aldershot Senior Cup for the first time after defeating Badshot Lea on penalties. The Field had progressed to the final the previous season, where they met a then Combined Counties Division Badshot Lea side, but were defeated 2-0.

On 16 May 2024, the club announced that Ian Selley had resigned so that he could take up the vacant manager position at Leatherhead. He was replaced by player-manager Andrew Crossley, who guided The Field to a twelfth placed finish in the 2024/25 campaign.

The 2025/26 campaign saw the Field equal their best ever run in the FA Cup, reaching the Second Qualifying Round, where they were defeated 6-0 by Horsham in a replay after a 2-2 draw at Woking Park. The Field also secured their highest ever league finish, sitting in second place following a 4-2 win against Hendon, setting up a play-off semi-final at Woking Park vs fifth placed AFC Portchester. The game ended 1-1 in regular time, with The Field then winning 7-6 on penalties. They lost 2-0 in the play-off final against Hanworth Villa in front of a record-breaking crowd of 1,497 at Woking Park.

The season ended in triumph, however, as the Field lifted the Aldershot Senior Cup once again, defeating Yateley United 1-0 in the final, with the sole goal coming from forward Trey Masikini.

== Ground ==
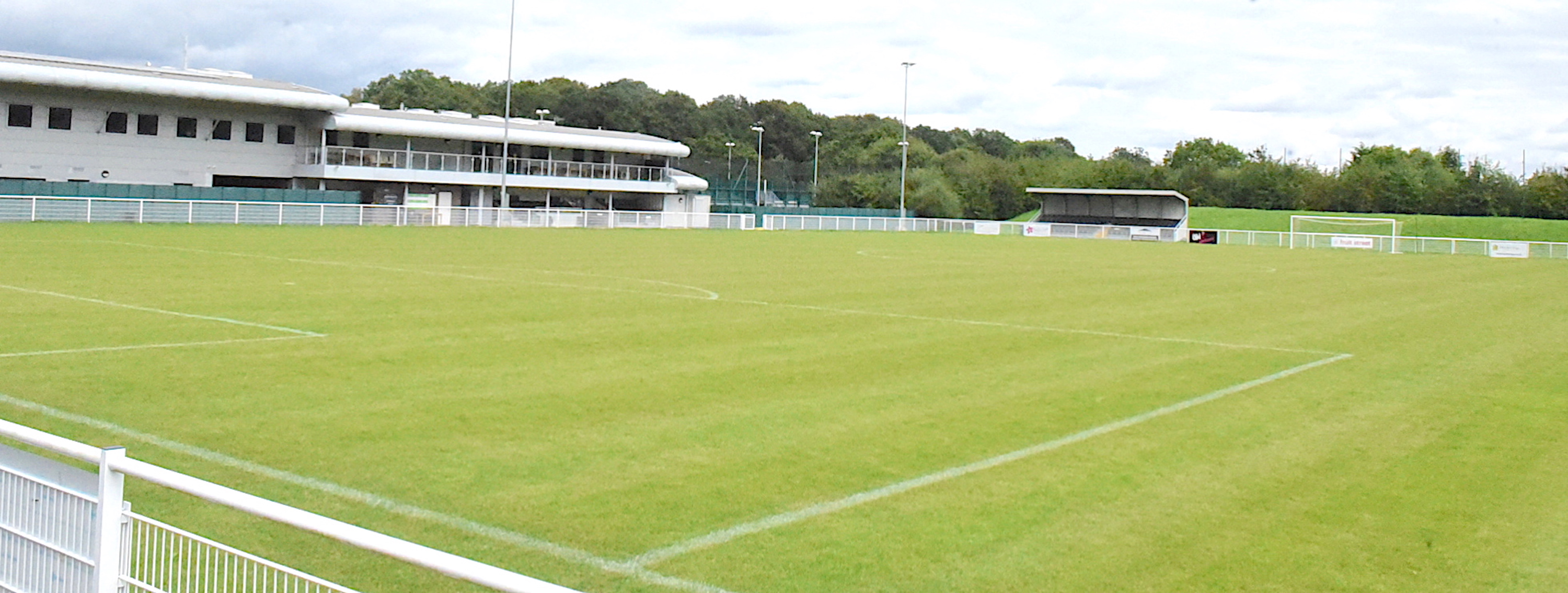
Woking Park, home of Westfield F.C.

Westfield play their home games at Woking Park, Woking, Surrey, GU22 9BA. The ground is located on the north side of Kingfield Road, Woking, on the south side is fellow local non-league side Woking F.C. The top of Woking's Leslie Gosden Stand and floodlights at Kingfield Stadium are visible from the balcony at Woking Park.

The Field moved to their current location around 1960, with floodlights being installed in 1998. Major work was undertaken to the ground in the 2010–11 season, which saw the building of a new stand and facilities and the pitch being dug up and raised in May 2011. A new 50 seater stand was constructed in March 2014 at the western end of the football ground to comply with FA Ground Grading requirements (shown in picture to right), this was later expanded to 104 seats in March 2019 following the club's promotion to the Isthmian League.

== Current squad ==
As of 4 November 2026

Note: Flags indicate national team as defined under FIFA eligibility rules; some limited exceptions apply. Players may hold more than one non-FIFA nationality.

Pos.	Nation	Player
GK	ENG	Lewis Gallifent
DF	ENG	Harry Bowden (dual-registered with Basingstoke Town)
DF	ENG	Ibrahim Busari
DF	GRE	Manolis Gogonas
DF	ENG	George Hedley
DF	ENG	Max Meaton (captain)
DF	ENG	KJ Osu
DF	ENG	Tom Smith
MF	ENG	David Barrie Diaz
MF	ENG	Andy Crossley (player-manager)
MF	ENG	Rohdell Gordon
MF	ENG	Alfie Huckle

Pos.	Nation	Player
MF	ENG	Dennis Kelmendi
MF	ENG	Jack Knight
MF	ENG	Mikey O'Connor
MF	ENG	Devonte Webster-Swack
MF	ENG	Caleb Wright
MF	ENG	Kai Zini
FW	ENG	Alex Cruickshank
FW	ENG	Aderi Dede
FW	ENG	Kamaron English
FW	ENG	Trey Masikini
FW	ENG	Sean O'Brien
FW	ENG	James Roberts

== Staff ==
- President - David Robson
- Chairman - Steve Perkins
- Vice Chairman & Commercial Manager - Jim Ahmed
- Honorary Secretary - Michael Powell
- Match Secretary and Social Media Lead - Darren Pasley
- Treasurer - Denis Healy
- Catering Manager - Maggie Powell
- Safeguarding Officer - Michael Lawrence
- Bar Manager - Neil Harding
- Programme Editor and Social Media Assistant - Harrison Powell
- Social Media Assistants - Tom Oxtoby & Theo Powell
- Hospitality Manager - Michael Robson
- Videographer - Ben Bronx
- Turnstile Operator - Chris Pasley
- First Team Manager - Andrew Crossley
- Assistant Managers - Dave Powell & Jake Baxter
- Coach - Marc Gorman
- GK Coach - Gary Dodd
- Sports therapist- Daniel Dodd
- Physio - Katie Williams
- Vice Presidents - John Ellesley, Philip Arthur-Worsop, Peter Gales, Nobby Reynolds, Alan Evans, Brian Weston, John McIlhargy, John Ludlow, Mick Joseph, Doreen Cable, Michael Lawrence, Alan Morton, Graham Pope, Colin Rearden, Neil Harding, Pat Kelly, David Robson, Michael Robson, Martin Powell, Mark Pullen & Richard Hill

(Last updated: 11 June 2026)

== Honours ==
=== League honours ===
- Combined Counties Football League:
  - Champions (1): 2017–18
  - Runners up (1): 2016–17
- Surrey Senior League:
  - Champions (2): 1972–73, 1973–74
- Parthenon League:
  - Runners up (1): 1962–63

=== Cup honours ===
- Combined Counties Football League Premier Cup:
  - Winners (1): 2016–17
- Surrey Senior League Cup:
  - Winners (2): 1971–72, 1972–73
- Combined Counties Football League Cup:
  - Runners up (1): 1989–90
- Combined Counties Football League Division One Challenge Cup:
  - Runners up (1): 2011–12
- Surrey FA Saturday Premier Cup :
  - Runners-up (1): 2012–13
- Surrey County Junior Cup:
  - Winners (1): 1954–55
  - Runners up (2): 1955–56, 1957–58
- Surrey County Junior Charity Cup:
  - Runners up (1): 1954–55
- Aldershot Senior Cup
  - Winners (2): 2023-24, 2025-26
  - Runners up (1): 2022-23

== Records ==
- Highest League Position: 2nd in Isthmian League South Central Division - 2025-26
- FA Cup best performance: 2nd Qualifying Round - 2022–23, 2025–26
- FA Trophy best performance: 1st Round Proper - 2023–24
- FA Vase best performance: Fourth round – 2000–01
- Highest Attendance: 1,497 vs Hanworth Villa, Isthmian League South Central Division Play-Off Final - 2025-26
- Oldest Competitive Player: Roger Steer (1 appearance) 2017–18

== Westfield Ladies ==
Westfield Football Club had operated a women's football team, Westfield Ladies FC. It had been affiliated to the men's team since forming in 2009 until 2014, and contributes into the club's community development programme. The Ladies won their respective league in their opening season and played their homes games at Woking Park. However, after only a few seasons the ladies team was dissolved leaving only the senior men's team and the reserves (now U18s).
