= 2003–04 Essex Senior Football League =

The 2003–04 season was the 33rd in the history of Essex Senior Football League a football competition in England.

The league featured 15 clubs which competed in the league last season, along with one new club:

- London APSA, joined from the Essex Business Houses League

Concord Rangers were champions, winning their second Essex Senior League title, while Ilford were promoted to the Isthmian League.

== League table ==
Essex Senior Football League
- Season: 2003–04
- Champions: Concord Rangers
- Promoted: Ilford
- Matches: 240
- Goals: 784 (3.27 per match)

Pos	Team	Pld	W	D	L	GF	GA	GD	Pts	Promotion or relegation
1	Concord Rangers	30	22	4	4	75	26	+49	70	
2	Ilford	30	19	8	3	66	23	+43	65	Promoted to the Isthmian League
3	Sawbridgeworth Town	30	19	6	5	60	29	+31	63	
4	Enfield Town	30	18	9	3	60	35	+25	63	
5	Romford	30	18	4	8	66	39	+27	58	
6	Waltham Abbey	30	16	6	8	50	37	+13	54	
7	Basildon United	30	15	4	11	67	42	+25	49	
8	Bowers United	30	13	4	13	41	51	−10	43	
9	Eton Manor	30	9	8	13	43	52	−9	35	
10	Southend Manor	30	9	7	14	42	50	−8	34	
11	Barkingside	30	9	6	15	46	62	−16	33	
12	Burnham Ramblers	30	7	10	13	42	58	−16	31	
13	Stansted	30	7	5	18	33	72	−39	26	
14	Brentwood	30	5	5	20	31	60	−29	20	
15	London APSA	30	5	5	20	34	76	−42	20	
16	Hullbridge Sports	30	2	3	25	28	72	−44	9	

Source: fchd
Rules for classification: 1) points; 2) goal difference; 3) number of goals scored.
