= Eastern Floodlight League =

- Founded: 1964
- Folded: 2007
- Country: England
- Most championships: Chelmsford City (6 titles)

The Eastern Floodlight League, formerly known as the Eastern Professional Floodlight League, was a football knock-out cup competition played from the 1960s until the 2000s.

== History ==
The Eastern Professional Floodlight League was founded in 1964 to provide additional midweek matches for semi-professional teams in the East and South East of England.

Initially running on a league basis, it quickly grew from the seven clubs of its inaugural season to ten clubs by 1966.

Several seasons of the competition were not completed, including its final season.

== Winners ==
Season	Winner
Eastern Professional Floodlight League
1964-65	Wimbledon
1965-66	Cambridge City
1966-67	Chelmsford City
1967-68	Romford
1968-69	King's Lynn Town
1969-70	Cambridge United
1970-71	Bedford Town
1971-72	Boston United
1972-73	Cambridge City
1973-74	Competition not completed
1974-75	Chelmsford City
1975-76	Ilford
1976-77	Maidstone United
1977-78	Chelmsford City
1978-79	Competition not completed
1979-80	Dartford
1980-81	Chatham Town
1981-82	Chelmsford City
1982-83	Chelmsford City
1983-84	Stansted
1984-85	Bishop's Stortford
Eastern Floodlight League
1985-86	Braintree Town
1986-87	Chelmsford City
1987-88	Dover Athletic
1988-89	Dover Athletic
1989-90	Hythe Town
1990-91	Hythe Town
1991-92	Saffron Walden Town
1992-93	Saffron Walden Town
1993-94	Heybridge Swifts
1994-95	Competition not completed
1995-96	Clacton Town
1996-97	Braintree Town
1997-98	Leyton Pennant
1998-99	Leyton Pennant
1999-00	Saffron Walden Town
2000-01	Competition not completed
2001-02	Cornard United
2002-03	Southend Manor
2003-04	Concord Rangers
2004-05	Heybridge Swifts
2005-06	Billericay Town
2006-07	Competition not completed
