= Essex Senior Cup =

- Organiser(s): Essex County FA
- Founded: 1883; 143 years ago
- Region: Essex
- Teams: 44
- Current champions: Billericay Town (5th title)
- Most championships: Ilford (13 titles)
- Website: Essex Senior Cup

The Essex Senior Cup is a knock-out system football competition that has been running since 1884, and is the most prestigious cup competition in the county of Essex. The competition is run mainly for non-League clubs in the region, although league sides have been known to enter the competition, such as Colchester United, Dagenham & Redbridge, Leyton Orient and Southend United. Ilford have won the competition the most times, with 13 wins (their first victory came in 1888 and their most recent in 1954). The current holders are Billericay Town, who beat Great Wakering Rovers F.C. 2-1 in the 2026 final at Colchester United F.C's JobServe Community Stadium.

== Finals ==
The following shows a full list of winners and runners-up in the Essex Senior Cup since the knock-out competition was started in 1883.

Key
Score	Match went to extra time
Score	Match decided by a penalty shootout after extra time
Note	Match went to a replay

Season	Winners	Result	Runner-up	Notes
1883–84	Colchester	3–1	Braintree	
1884–85	Old Foresters	7–0	Woodford Bridge	
1885–86	Old Foresters	5–0	Ilford	
1886–87	Old Foresters	7–1	Grange Park	
1887–88	Ilford	3–1	Upton Excelsior	
1888–89	Ilford	2–0	Somerset Light Infantry	
1889–90	Ilford	2–0	Romford	
1890–91	Clapton	7–0	Harwich & Parkeston	
1891–92	Ilford	3–1	Colchester	
1892–93	Chelmsford	3–0	Romford	
1893–94	Woodville	5–1	Braintree Gordon	
1894–95	Upton Park	2–1	Harwich & Parkeston	
1895–96	Barking Woodville	2–0	Woodford	
1896–97	Leyton	4–0	York and Lancaster Regiment	
1897–98	Leyton	3–0	Romford	
1898–99	Harwich & Parkeston	2–0	Leytonstone	
1899–1900	Leyton	5–1	Colchester Town	
1900–01	Leyton	4–3	Woodford	
1901–02	Chelmsford	5–2	Leytonstone	
1902–03	Leyton	2–1	Colchester Crown	
1903–04	Ilford	7–0	South Weald	
1904–05	Leytonstone	3–1	Chelmsford	
1905–06	Wanstead	2–0	South Weald	
1906–07	South Weald	5–0	Harwich & Parkeston	
1907–08	Ilford	3–0	Walthamstow Grange	
1908–09	King's Royal Rifle Corps	4–0	Barking	
1909–10	South Weald	1–0	Leytonstone	
1910–11	Custom House	3–1	South Weald	
1911–12	Romford Town	1–0	South Weald	
1912–13	Ilford	3–2	Romford Town	
1913–14	Leytonstone	2–1	Harwich & Parkeston	Replay after 2–2 draw.
1914–15	Grays Athletic	2–1	Clapton	
1915–1919	No competition - World War I			
1919–20	Barking Town	1–0	Grays Athletic	
1920–21	Grays Athletic	2–1	Great Eastern Railway (Romford)	
1921–22	Custom House	1–0	Harwich & Parkeston	Replay after 1–1 draw.
1922–23	Grays Athletic	4–1	Harwich & Parkeston	
1923–24	Ilford	1–0	Grays Athletic	Replay after 3–3 draw.
1924–25	Clapton	2–0	Leyton	Replay after 0–0 draw.
1925–26	Clapton	2–0	Grays Athletic	
1926–27	Ilford	2–1	Barking Town	
1927–28	Ilford	2–1	Barking Town	
1928–29	Ilford	8–1	Barking Town	
1929–30	Leyton	2–1	Barking Town	
1930–31	Leyton	2–0	Chelmsford	
1931–32	Romford	3–0	Clapton	
1932–33	Walthamstow Avenue	2–1	Leyton	
1933–34	Romford	3–0	Walthamstow Avenue	
1934–35	Leyton	1–0	Harwich & Parkeston	Replay after 1–1 draw.
1935–36	Walthamstow Avenue	3–2	Ilford	
1936–37	Harwich & Parkeston	2–1	Ilford	Replay after 2–2 draw.
1937–38	Romford	3–1	Eton Manor	Replay after 0–0 draw.
1938–39	Walthamstow Avenue	1–0	Barking	
1939–40	Briggs Sports	3–0	Leyton	
1940–1944	No competition due to World War II.			
1944–45	Grays Athletic	2–1	Clapton	Replay after 3–3 draw.
1945–46	Barking	3–2	Romford	Replay after 2–2 draw.
1946–47	Romford	1–0	Tilbury	
1947–48	Leytonstone	4–0	Tilbury	
1948–49	Leytonstone	3–0	Leyton	
1949–50	Briggs Sports	4–0	Leyton	
1950–51	Briggs Sports	3–1	Barking	
1951–52	Briggs Sports	1–0	Romford	
1952–53	Ilford	3–1	Grays Athletic	
1953–54	Ilford	2–0	Grays Athletic	
1954–55	Clapton	3–2	Grays Athletic	
1955–56	Walthamstow Avenue	3–1	Dagenham	
1956–57	Grays Athletic	3–1	Ilford	
1957–58	Walthamstow Avenue	2–1	Grays Athletic	
1958–59	Walthamstow Avenue	1–0	Romford	
1959–60	Walthamstow Avenue	3–0	Harwich & Parkeston	
1960–61	Tilbury	4–1	Walthamstow Avenue	
1961–62	Dagenham	3–1	Walthamstow Avenue	On aggregate
1962–63	Barking	3–2	Ilford	On aggregate
1963–64	Tilbury	4–3	Ford United	On aggregate
1964–65	Leytonstone	7–1	Aveley	On aggregate
1965–66	Leytonstone	5–1	Grays Athletic	On aggregate
1966–67	Leytonstone	7–5	Barking	On aggregate
1967–68	Dagenham	4–3	Leytonstone	On aggregate
1968–69	Walthamstow Avenue	2–1	Leytonstone	On aggregate
1969–70	Barking	3–1	Tilbury	On aggregate
1970–71	Dagenham	1–0	Leytonstone	On aggregate
1971–72	Walthamstow Avenue	2–1	Tilbury	On aggregate
1972–73	Tilbury	2–0	Dagenham	On aggregate
1973–74	Walthamstow Avenue	4–0	Leytonstone	On aggregate
1974–75	Tilbury	3–2	Dagenham	
1975–76	Billericay Town	3–2	Epping Town	
1976–77	Walthamstow Avenue	1–0	Romford	
1977–78	Dagenham	7–1	Harwich & Parkeston	
1978–79	Harlow Town	1–0	Tilbury	
1979–80	Dagenham	2–1	Harwich & Parkeston	
1980–81	Dagenham	6–2	Chelmsford City	Replay after 1–1 draw.
1981–82	Leytonstone & Ilford	2–1	Colchester United	
1982–83	Southend United	2–0	Clapton	
1983–84	Clapton	1–0	Southend United	
1984–85	Walthamstow Avenue	2–1	Dagenham	
1985–86	Chelmsford City	3–0	Billericay Town	On aggregate
1986–87	Dagenham	2–1	Southend United	
1987–88	Grays Athletic	1–0	Leytonstone & Ilford	
1988–89	Chelmsford City	3–2	Grays Athletic	
1989–90	Barking	4–0	Southend United	Replay after 1–1 draw.
1990–91	Southend United	3–2	Leyton Orient	Replay after 1–1 draw.
1991–92	Redbridge Forest	3–0	Chelmsford City	
1992–93	Chelmsford City	1–0	Wivenhoe Town	
1993–94	Grays Athletic	1–0	Billericay Town	
1994–95	Grays Athletic	1–0	Billericay Town	
1995–96	Braintree Town	2–1	Billericay Town	
1996–97	Southend United	2–1	Braintree Town	
1997–98	Dagenham & Redbridge	2–1	Purfleet	
1998–99	Canvey Island	2–1	Leyton Orient	
1999–2000	Canvey Island	2–0	Purfleet	
2000–01	Dagenham & Redbridge	2–2	Canvey Island	5–3 on penalties
2001–02	Canvey Island	6–1	Dagenham & Redbridge	
2002–03	Chelmsford City	5–0	Aveley	
2003–04	Thurrock	3–1	Aveley	
2004–05	Thurrock	1–0	Halstead Town	
2005–06	Waltham Forest			Awarded (Note: The 2005–06 final was not played due to Chelmsford City and Braintree Town being removed from the competition following the abandonment of their semi-final in the second half (63rd minute) due to an all-in-brawl. Waltham Forest beat Heybridge Swifts 3–0 in their semi-final.)
2006–07	A.F.C. Hornchurch	2–1	Great Wakering Rovers	
2007–08	Southend United	1–0	Chelmsford City	
2008–09	Chelmsford City	2–0	Concord Rangers	
2009–10	Colchester United	2–1	A.F.C. Hornchurch	
2010–11	Billericay Town	2–0	Aveley	
2011–12	Canvey Island	1–0	Colchester United	
2012–13	A.F.C. Hornchurch	2–1	Grays Athletic	
2013–14	Concord Rangers	2–1	Braintree Town	
2014–15	Concord Rangers	5–0	Billericay Town	
2015–16	Concord Rangers	1–0	Heybridge Swifts	
2016–17	Chelmsford City	1–0	East Thurrock United	
2017–18	Billericay Town	2–1	Chelmsford City	
2018–19	East Thurrock United	3–1	Chelmsford City	
2019–20	Competition not completed due to COVID-19 pandemic.			
2020–21	Competition not completed due to COVID-19 pandemic.			
2021–22	Billericay Town	1–0	Bowers & Pitsea	
2022–23	Braintree Town	2–0	Concord Rangers	
2023–24	Redbridge	0–0	Colchester United	5–4 on penalties.
2024–25	Canvey Island	1–1	Hornchurch	4–2 on penalties.
2025–26	Billericay Town	2–1	Great Wakering Rovers	

=== Wins by teams ===
Club	Wins	First final won	Last final won	Runner-up	Last final lost	Total final apps.	Notes
Ilford	13	1887–88	1953–54	5	1962–63	18	
Walthamstow Avenue †	12	1932–33	1984–85	3	1961–62	15	(Note: Dissolved in 1988. Merged with Leytonstone & Ilford.)
Chelmsford City	8	1892–93	2016–17	7	2018–19	15	(Note: Won 2 titles as Chelmsford.)
Grays Athletic	8	1914–15	1994–95	10	2012–13	18	
Leyton †	8	1896–97	1934–35	5	1949–50	13	(Note: Dissolved in 2011.)
Dagenham †	7	1896–97	1934–35	4	1949–50	11	(Note: Dissolved in 1992. Merged with Redbridge Forest to form Dagenham & Redbridge.)
Leytonstone †	7	1904–05	1966–67	7	1973–74	14	(Note: Dissolved in 1979. Merged with Ilford to form Leytonstone & Ilford.)
Barking	5	1919–15	1989–90	8	1966–67	13	(Note: Won 1 title as Barking Town.)
Romford	5	1911–12	1946–47	8	1976–77	13	(Note: Won 1 title as Romford Town.)
Clapton	5	1890–91	1983–84	4	1982–83	9	
Canvey Island	5	1998–99	2024–25	1	2000–01	6	
Billericay Town	5	1975–76	2025–26	5	2014–15	10	
Tilbury	4	1960–61	1974–75	5	1978–79	9	
Southend United	4	1982–83	2007–08	3	1989–90	7	
Briggs Sports †	4	1939–40	1851–52	0	–	4	(Note: Dissolved in 1959.)
Concord Rangers	3	2013–14	2015–16	2	2022–23	5	
Old Foresters	3	1884–85	1886–87	0	–	3	
Harwich & Parkeston	2	1898–99	1936–37	10	1979–80	12	
South Weald	2	1906–07	1909–10	4	1911–12	6	
Braintree Town	2	1995–96	2022–23	2	2013–14	4	
A.F.C. Hornchurch	2	2006–07	2012–13	2	2024–25	4	
Dagenham & Redbridge	2	1997–98	2000–01	1	2001–02	3	
Redbridge Forest †	2	1981–82	1981–82	1	1987–88	2	(Note: Dissolved in 1992. Merged with Dagenham to form Dagenham & Redbridge. Won 1 title as Leytonstone & Ilford.)
Custom House †	2	1910–11	1921–21	0	–	2	(Note: Dissolved in mid-20th century.)
Thurrock †	2	2003–04	2004–05	0	–	2	(Note: Dissolved in 2018.)
Colchester †	1	1883–84	1883–84	2	1899–1900	3	(Note: Dissolved in 1937.)
Colchester United	1	2009–10	2009–10	2	2011–12	3	
East Thurrock United †	1	2018–19	2018–19	1	2016–17	2	(Note: Dissolved in 2023.)
Redbridge	1	2023–24	2023–24	1	1963–64	2	
Barking Woodville †	1	1895–96	1895–96	0	–	1	(Note: Dissolved in 1896. Merged with Barking Rovers to form Barking Institute.)
Harlow Town	1	1978–79	1978–79	0	–	1	
King's Royal Rifle Corps †	1	1908–09	1908–09	0	–	1	(Note: Military team. Regiment ceased to exist in 1958.)
Upton Park †	1	1894–95	1894–95	0	–	1	(Note: Dissolved in 1887 & again in 1911.)
Waltham Forest	1	2005–06	2005–06	0	–	1	
Wanstead	1	1905–06	1905–06	0	–	1	
Woodville †	1	1893–94	1893–94	0	–	1	(Note: Dissolved in 1996.)

=== Wins by cities/towns ===
City/Town	County	Wins	Teams
Walthamstow	Greater London	16	Walthamstow Avenue (12), Old Foresters (3), Waltham Forest (1)
Dagenham	Greater London	15	Dagenham (7), Briggs Sports (4), Dagenham & Redbridge (2), Redbridge Forest (1), Woodville (1)
Ilford	Greater London	14	Ilford (13), Redbridge (1)
Chelmsford	Essex	8	Chelmsford City (8)
Grays	Essex	8	Grays Athletic (8)
Leyton	Greater London	8	Leyton (8)
Leytonstone	Greater London	7	Leytonstone (7)
Canvey Island	Essex	8	Canvey Island (5), Concord Rangers (3)
Barking	Greater London	6	Barking (5), Barking Woodville (1)
London	Greater London	5	Clapton (5)
Romford	Greater London	5	Romford (5)
Billericay	Essex	5	Billericay Town (5)
Tilbury	Essex	4	Tilbury (4)
Southend-on-Sea	Essex	4	Southend United (4)
Harwich	Essex	2	Harwich & Parkeston (2)
Brentwood	Essex	2	South Weald (2)
Braintree	Essex	2	Braintree Town (2)
Upminster	Greater London	2	A.F.C. Hornchurch (2)
Custom House	Greater London	2	Custom House (2)
Thurrock	Essex	2	Thurrock (2)
Colchester	Essex	2	Colchester (1), Colchester United (1)
Corringham	Essex	1	East Thurrock United (1)
Harlow	Essex	1	Harlow Town (1)
Winchester	Hampshire	1	King's Royal Rifle Corps (1)
Upton Park	Greater London	1	Upton Park (1)
Wanstead	Greater London	1	Wanstead (1)
