= Lamar Jackson (disambiguation) =

Lamar Jackson (born 1997) is an American football quarterback for the Baltimore Ravens.

Lamar Jackson may also refer to:

- Lamar Jackson (cornerback) (born 1998), American football cornerback
- Bo Jackson (2020s running back) (born Lamar Jackson), American football running back
- Lamar Jackson, actor in films including Smokey and the Bandit

== See also ==
- Brandon Jackson (American football) (born 1985, middle name Lamar), American former football player
- Cedric Jackson (born 1986, middle name Lamar), American former professional basketball player
- Dexter Jackson (safety) (born 1977, middle name Lamar), American former football player
- Wayne Jackson (musician) (1941–2016, middle name Lamar), American musician
- Lamar Johnson (disambiguation)
