= Joseph Hughes (footballer) =

English footballer

Personal information
- Full name: Clifford Joseph Gwendy Hughes
- Date of birth: 27 June 1891
- Place of birth: Willesden, England
- Date of death: 1966 (aged 75)
- Place of death: England
- Height: 5 ft 9 in (1.75 m)
- Position: Goalkeeper

Senior career*
Years	Team	Apps	(Gls)
- Tufnell Park
- South Weald
1911–1915	West Ham United	90	(0)
1919–1921	Bolton Wanderers	41	(0)
1921–1922	Charlton Athletic	19	(0)
1922–1923	Clapton Orient	0	(0)
- * Club domestic league appearances and goals

Clifford Joseph Gwendy Hughes (27 June 1891 – 1966) was a footballer who played as goalkeeper for Tufnell Park, South Weald, West Ham United, Bolton Wanderers and Charlton Athletic.

== Club career ==
After spells at Tufnell Park and South Weald, Hughes joined West Ham United in 1911 and made his debut against rivals Millwall in a 2–1 victory on 4 November 1911. Hughes played over 100 times in all competitions for West Ham before requesting manager Syd King transfer list him after remarking on Ted Hufton's ability during a trial, King obliged and sold Hughes to Bolton Wanderers for £350.

Hughes' career was interrupted due to the outbreak of World War I, with Hughes playing for Chelsea in that period. Hughes joined Charlton Athletic in the summer of 1921 in time for the club's debut Football League campaign where he made 19 appearances. After his departure from Charlton, Hughes spent the 1922–1923 season at Clapton Orient before retiring from professional football.
