= 1995–96 Essex Senior Football League =

The 1995–96 season was the 25th in the history of Essex Senior Football League a football competition in England.

The league featured 15 clubs which competed in the league last season, no new clubs joined the league this season.

Romford were champions, winning their first Essex Senior League title and merged with Collier Row to form united club that took Collier Row's place in the Isthmian League.

== League table ==
Essex Senior Football League
- Season: 1995–96
- Champions: Romford
- Matches: 210
- Goals: 785 (3.74 per match)

Pos	Team	Pld	W	D	L	GF	GA	GD	Pts	Promotion or relegation
1	Romford	28	23	2	3	91	27	+64	71	Merged with Collier Row
2	Great Wakering Rovers	28	20	4	4	67	28	+39	64	
3	Concord Rangers	28	20	3	5	67	31	+36	63	
4	Maldon Town	28	16	4	8	87	47	+40	52	Transferred to the Eastern Counties League
5	Ford United	28	14	6	8	59	53	+6	48	
6	Sawbridgeworth Town	28	13	5	10	59	43	+16	44	
7	Stansted	28	12	8	8	47	34	+13	44	
8	Southend Manor	28	12	7	9	50	49	+1	43	
9	Burnham Ramblers	28	13	3	12	63	48	+15	42	
10	Brentwood	28	13	2	13	56	53	+3	41	
11	Basildon United	28	5	8	15	31	52	−21	23	
12	Bowers United	28	5	6	17	28	57	−29	18 (Note: Bowers United were deducted three points.)	
13	Eton Manor	28	4	6	18	32	72	−40	18	
14	Hullbridge Sports	28	4	5	19	30	88	−58	17	
15	East Ham United	28	0	3	25	18	103	−85	3	

Source: fchd
Rules for classification: 1) points; 2) goal difference; 3) number of goals scored.
