= Dondre Abraham =

Footballer (born 2006)

Personal information
- Date of birth: 24 May 2006 (age 20)
- Place of birth: Enfield, England
- Height: 1.86 m (6 ft 1 in)
- Position: Goalkeeper

Team information
- Current team: White Ensign

Youth career
- 2015–2024: West Ham United

Senior career*
Years	Team	Apps	(Gls)
2024–2025	West Ham United	0	(0)
2024	→ Concord Rangers (loan)	3	(0)
2025	Billericay Town	0	(0)
2025–	White Ensign	4	(0)

International career^{‡}
2023	England U17	1	(0)
2025–	Saint Vincent and the Grenadines	2	(0)
- * Club domestic league appearances and goals as of 15:00, 21 December 2025 (UTC) ‡ National team caps and goals as of 15:00, 21 December 2025 (UTC)

Dondre Abraham (born 24 May 2006) is a professional footballer who last played as a goalkeeper for White Ensign. Born in England, he represents Saint Vincent and the Grenadines at international level.

== Club career ==
In 2015, Abraham joined the academy at West Ham United. Ahead of the 2024–25 season, he joined Isthmian League North Division side Concord Rangers on loan. On 9 June 2025, West Ham announced Abraham would be departing the club at the end of his contract.

Following his release from West Ham, Abraham joined Essex-based clubs Billericay Town and White Ensign.

== International career ==
On 14 January 2023, Abraham made his debut for England under-17's in a 6–0 win against Germany.

On 9 March 2025, Abraham made his debut for Saint Vincent and the Grenadines in a 1–1 draw against Grenada.
