= Lamar Johnson (footballer) =

Saint Lucian footballer

Personal information
- Date of birth: 4 November 1991 (age 34)
- Place of birth: Hackney, England
- Height: 1.83 m (6 ft 0 in)
- Position: Goalkeeper

Team information
- Current team: Romford
- Number: 1

Youth career
- Charlton Athletic
- Thurrock

Senior career*
Years	Team	Apps	(Gls)
2010–2011	Concord Rangers	2	(0)
2011	Romford	43	(0)
2011	Aveley	9	(0)
- Canvey Island
2012–2016	Grays Athletic	79	(0)
2014	→ Tilbury (loan)	5	(0)
2014	→ Lowestoft Town (loan)	1	(0)
2015	→ Soham Town Rangers (loan)	5	(0)
2015	→ Tilbury (loan)	3	(0)
2016–2017	Aveley	53	(0)
2017	→ Chelmsford City (loan)	0	(0)
2017–2018	Grays Athletic	32	(0)
2018	Hertford Town	26	(0)
2018	Basildon United	2	(0)
2018–2019	Waltham Abbey	16	(0)
2019	Aveley	12	(0)
2019–2020	Canvey Island	36	(0)
2020–2021	Bowers & Pitsea	6	(0)
2021–2022	Haringey Borough	8	(0)
2022	Tilbury	8	(0)
2022	Walthamstow		
2022–2023	Hornchurch	7	(0)
2023	Concord Rangers		
2023–2024	Harefield United		
2024	Tower Hamlets		
2024–2025	Enfield	13	(0)
2025	Risborough Rangers	6	(0)
2025–	Walthamstow	9	(0)
2025–	Welwyn Garden City	23	(0)

International career^{‡}
2020–	Saint Lucia	2	(0)
- * Club domestic league appearances and goals as of 23 March 2026 ‡ National team caps and goals as of 24 March 2026

Lamar Johnson (born 4 November 1991) is a footballer who plays as a goalkeeper for Romford and the Saint Lucia national football team.

== Club career ==
Johnson began his career in the youth systems at Charlton Athletic and Thurrock, before joining non-League club Concord Rangers in 2010. Johnson's formative years were spent at Romford, Aveley and Canvey Island, before signing for Grays Athletic in 2012.

In January 2014, following an off the field incident against Bury Town that had occurred on 25 September 2013, Johnson was given a year long ban by The Football Association. Upon the completion of his ban, Johnson re-signed for Grays, going out on loan to Tilbury in order to gain match fitness. Whilst at Grays, loans to Soham Town Rangers and Harlow Town followed, before departing in 2016, re-joining tenants Aveley. On 24 March 2017, Johnson, alongside Canvey Island goalkeeper Conor Gough, joined Chelmsford City on dual-registration as cover for Ross Fitzsimons during Chelmsford's National League South run-in. During the 2017–18 season, Johnson re-signed for Grays, having spells at Hertford Town, Basildon United, Waltham Abbey and Aveley in the following campaign. In July 2019, Canvey Island signed Johnson. In the summer Johnson moved to Canveys near neighbour's Bowers & Pitsea.

In the period November 2021 until the end of January, Johnson played for Haringey Borough, before continuing his career at Tilbury. In the summer 2022, Johnson joined Walthamstow.

From November 2022 until the end of the 2022-23 season, Johnson played for Hornchurch before moving to Concord Rangers. Later in 2023, he moved to Harefield United.

During the first half part of 2024, Johnson played for Tower Hamlets FC. In the summer 2024, he joined Enfield. In the beginning of 2025, he moved to Risborough Rangers. In March 2025, he returned to his former club, Walthamstow.

It was announced on the 9 June 2026 that Johnson would be joining his former club Romford in the Essex Senior League

== International career ==
In November 2019, Johnson received a call-up for Saint Lucia. On 16 November 2019, Johnson kept a clean-sheet on his debut for the country in a 1–0 win against the Dominican Republic.
