= Benstock =

Benstock is an English surname. Notable people with this surname include:

- Bernard Benstock (1930–1994), American literary critic
- Danny Benstock (born 1970), English footballer
- Shari Benstock (1944–2015), American literary scholar, pen name of Shari Gabrielson Goodmann
