= Ricky Modeste =

Footballer (born 1988)

Personal information
- Full name: Ricky Steve Modeste
- Date of birth: 20 February 1988 (age 38)
- Place of birth: Dagenham, England
- Height: 1.78 m (5 ft 10 in)
- Position: Winger

Team information
- Current team: Concord Rangers (manager)

Youth career
- Charlton Athletic
- Arsenal
- Rushden & Diamonds
- 2006–2007: Waltham Forest

Senior career*
Years	Team	Apps	(Gls)
2007–2012	Chelmsford City	92	(8)
2008–2009	→ Witham Town (loan)	8	(0)
2012–2017	Dover Athletic	150	(22)
2017–2018	Billericay Town	45	(6)
2018–2020	Dover Athletic	40	(6)
2020–2021	Dartford	3	(0)
2021–2022	Tonbridge Angels	18	(1)
2022–2024	Concord Rangers	62	(8)
2024	Potters Bar Town	8	(0)
2024–2025	Saffron Walden Town	36	(1)
2025–2026	Concord Rangers	18	(0)
Total		480	(52)

International career
2017–2021	Grenada	8	(2)

Managerial career
- 2026–: Concord Rangers
- * Club domestic league appearances and goals as of 20:00, 7 May 2026 (UTC)

Ricky Steve Modeste (born 20 February 1988) is former semi-professional footballer who played as a winger, who currently manages Concord Rangers. Born in England, he represented the Grenada national team at international level.

== Club career ==
Modeste began his career at Chelmsford City in 2007, Modeste broke into the first team at the club, making four appearances for the club in the 2008–09 season. In December 2008, Modeste joined Witham Town on loan, making eight league appearances in the Isthmian Division One North. During his time at Chelmsford, Modeste made over 100 appearances in all competitions as well as winning the club's Young Player of the Year award in 2009.

Modeste signed for Dover Athletic at the beginning of the 2012–13 season. Modeste helped the club gain promotion to the Conference National, after scoring twice in a 3–0 Conference South semi-final win over Sutton United, as well as assisting Nathan Elder's winner in the play-off final against Ebbsfleet United in May 2014.

In May 2017, Modeste rejected a new contract to stay with Dover, and subsequently signed for Billericay Town. On 7 December 2018, Modeste left Billericay. On 15 December 2018, Modeste re-signed for Dover.

In August 2020, Modeste joined Dartford.

On 25 June 2021, Modeste joined fellow National League South side Tonbridge Angels.

On 10 July 2022, Modeste joined Concord Rangers.

In March 2024, Modeste joined fellow Isthmian League Premier Division club Potters Bar Town.

Ahead of the 2024–25 season, Modeste signed for Essex Senior League side Saffron Walden Town.

In June 2025, Modeste returned to Concord Rangers.

== Managerial career ==
On 7 May 2026, Modeste was announced as manager of Concord Rangers.

== International career ==
In November 2017, Modeste received a call-up for the Grenada national team, qualifying through his grandfather. On 11 November 2017, he scored on his debut for Grenada in a 2–2 draw against Trinidad and Tobago.

=== International goals ===
Scores and results list Grenada's goal tally first, score column indicates score after each Modeste goal.

List of international goals scored by Ricky Modeste
No.	Date	Venue	Opponent	Score	Result	Competition
1	12 November 2017	Ato Boldon Stadium, Couva, Trinidad and Tobago	Trinidad and Tobago	2–0	2–2	Friendly
2	22 March 2018	Isidoro Beaton Stadium, Belmopan, Belize	Belize	1–0	2–4	Friendly
