= Chelmsford City F.C. =

English association football club

Coordinates: 51°45′12″N 0°27′05″E

Chelmsford City
- Full name: Chelmsford City Football Club
- Nicknames: City; The Clarets
- Founded: 1878 (Chelmsford); 1938 (Chelmsford City)
- Ground: Melbourne Stadium, Chelmsford
- Chairman: Spencer Gore
- Manager: Mark Cooper
- League: National League South
- 2025–26: National League South, 10th of 24
| Home colours | Away colours | Third colours |

Chelmsford City Football Club is a professional football club based in Chelmsford, Essex, England. Currently members of the National League South, the sixth tier of English football, they play at the Melbourne Stadium.

== History ==
=== Chelmsford ===
Chelmsford Football Club was established in 1878 by members of the Chelmsford Lawn Tennis and Croquet club to give them something to do in the winter. Six years earlier, an attempt to form a football club by the same name had been proposed by Chelmsford West End Cricket Club, but the plans failed to materialise. On 16 November 1878, Chelmsford played their first game, drawing 1–1 against Romford at home, with Chelmsford's first ever goal being scored by E. H. Christy. In May 1883, some members of the club proposed to fold the club and reform as a new club due to a lack of interest, however nothing came of it. The club won the Essex Senior Cup in 1892–93 and again in 1901–02. In 1895 they were founder members of the North Essex League, but left in 1900 to join Division One of the South Essex League. In 1903–04 the club also entered a team into the newly formed South East Anglian League, but left after a single season. They finished bottom of Division One of the South Essex League in 1903–04, and again in 1910–11. In 1908–09 they spent a season playing in the Eastern Division of the Spartan League.

In 1912 Chelmsford were amongst the founder members of the Athenian League, although they also continued to play in the South Essex League for another season. In 1922 the club failed to be re-elected and dropped into the Middlesex County League. In 1923–24 they also entered a team into the Essex & Suffolk Border League. That season saw the club win the Middlesex County League and finish second in the Border League, prompting them to step up to the Premier Division of the London League. In the following season, Chelmsford won the East Anglian Cup, a feat repeated in 1926–27 and 1928–29. The club won the London League Premier Division title in 1930–31, before becoming founder members of the Eastern Counties League in 1935. Two years later they left the ECL to become founder members of the Essex County League.

In 1938 it was decided to form a professional club to join the Southern League. Having seen how Colchester Town had fared so badly after the formation of the professional Colchester United, the existing club was closed down and reformed as "Chelmsford City", despite Chelmsford was not a city (although it was eventually granted city status in 2012). Chelmsford's last game as an amateur club came in the Chelmsford Hospital Cup, drawing 1–1 at New Writtle Street against Hoffman Athletic on 23 April 1938.

=== Chelmsford City ===
The new club continued playing at New Writtle Street and were accepted into the Southern League. On 27 August 1938 Chelmsford City played their first game, drawing 3–3 against Bristol Rovers Reserves. They made an immediate impact in the FA Cup, reaching the fourth round in their first season. After beating fellow non-League club Kidderminster Harriers 4–0 in the first round, they defeated Division Three North Darlington 3–1 in the second round and Second Division Southampton 4–1 in home matches with attendances in excess of 10,000. In the fourth round they lost 6–0 at Birmingham City. At the end of the season the club applied to join the Football League, but received only one vote. In the 1939–40 season the Southern League was split into Eastern and Western Divisions; City were Eastern Division champions and were declared joint overall champions after drawing a play-off with Lovells Athletic 3–3. The club were the Southern League's first champions when football resumed after World War II, also winning the Southern League Cup that season. They applied for Football League membership in 1947, 1948, 1950 and 1951 and 1956 but were unsuccessful on each occasion; their eight votes in 1950 put them second amongst the unsuccessful clubs, and marked their highest-ever vote total.

Chelmsford won the Southern League Cup again in 1959–60 and the league title in 1967–68 and 1971–72. They continued to apply to join the Football League, making bids in 1960, 1961, 1962 and every year between 1967 and 1971 and again from 1973 until 1976, but were unsuccessful; In total the club had 17 unsuccessful attempts at election into the Football League between 1947 and 1976. They remained in the top division of the Southern League until 1976–77, when they were relegated to Division One South. In 1977, City were one of six clubs to represent England in the Anglo-Italian Cup. After the formation of the Alliance Premier League they regained their top division status in the Southern League. The club were relegated again in 1987–88 but made an immediate return to the Premier Division after winning Division One South the following season. Another relegation was experienced in 1996–97 and after an issue with the seating at the ground meant they were refused promotion in 1997–98, they did not return to the Premier Division until 2001.

In 2004 Chelmsford transferred to the Premier Division of the Isthmian League and were champions in 2007–08, earning promotion to the Conference South. They reached the play-offs in the following season but lost to Hampton & Richmond in the play-off semi-finals. The club qualified for the play-offs again in 2009–10 and 2010–11, but lost in the semi-finals on both occasions. They reached the second round of FA Cup in 2010–11, losing 3–1 at Wycombe Wanderers. In the following season Chelmsford reached the second round again, taking Macclesfield Town to a replay after drawing at home, however they lost 1–0 in the replay at Moss Rose. During the 2012–13 season, the club reached the second round for the third consecutive year, defeating Essex rivals Colchester United 3–1 at Melbourne Park. At the end of the season the club qualified for the play-offs for the fourth time in five years, but lost in the semi-finals to Salisbury City.

After a period of mid-table finishes Chelmsford qualified for the play-offs again in 2016–17 after finishing fourth in the renamed National League South. After beating Dartford 2–1 on aggregate in the semi-finals, they lost 2–1 to Ebbsfleet United in the final. A third-place finish the following season led to another play-off campaign, but the club were beaten 1–0 by Hampton & Richmond Borough in the semi-finals. In the 2018–19 season, Chelmsford finished fourth, however lost 3–2 in the play-offs away to Welling United; their ninth play-off campaign in total. During the 2022–23 season, the club qualified for the first round of the FA Cup for the first time in five years, losing against Barnet in a replay, as well as qualifying for the play-offs for the first time since 2019, where they lost 1–0 against St Albans City. In the 2023–24 season, Chelmsford recorded their highest finish and highest points total since being in the National League South, finishing second in the division before losing 3–2 in the play-off semi-finals to local rivals Braintree Town.

=== Reserve team ===
When Chelmsford City was formed in 1938 it entered a reserve team into the Eastern Counties League. After World War II the team were champions in 1946–47, 1947–48 and 1948–49 (a season in which they also won the East Anglian Cup), going unbeaten in the first season. They also played in the London League between 1945 and 1948, winning the Premier Division in 1946–47 and 1947–48. Although the team's later years in the ECL were not as successful, they won the League Cup in 1960–61, before withdrawing in 1963 after losing the title to Lowestoft Town on goal average. They then joined the Metropolitan League, winning the league title and Professional Cup in 1967–68 before being disbanded in 1969 to reduce the club's running costs. However, the reserves were resurrected briefly in 1970–71 and then again in 1976 when the team joined the Essex Senior League, in which they played until 1990. The reserve team then joined the Essex & Herts Border Combination League and was disbanded again in 1997. Resurrected again in 2004, the reserve team rejoined the Border Combination, before moving to the Capital League in 2007. In 2014, the reserve team returned to the Essex & Herts Border Combination. In June 2021, the club confirmed the reserve side would enter the Essex & Suffolk Border League Premier Division. In June 2023, after two seasons in the Essex & Suffolk Border League, the club withdrew from the league.

== Ground ==
Chelmsford moved to New Writtle Street in 1925, playing their first game at New Writtle Street against West Ham United's reserves on 7 February 1925. having previously played at Broomfield Road, New Street and King's Head Meadow in the centre of the town.

After their establishment Chelmsford City continued to play at the New Writtle Street ground, which the club purchased in 1939. During the early parts of World War II the ground was shared by Southend United, before it became a barrage balloon site in 1942. On two occasions (the 1930s and 1940s) the stadium hosted greyhound racing. The record attendance of 16,807 was set for a local derby with Colchester United on 10 September 1949. Floodlights were installed in 1960 and several plans were made to increase facilities at the ground, including installing a swimming pool and building office blocks or a hotel, but none came to fruition. The club's first floodlit game was against Wisbech Town on 21 September 1960, with the official opening coming in a friendly against Norwich City on 3 October 1960.

In 1997 the site was sold to developers and the club had to move out of Chelmsford, with Chelmsford's last game at the ground being a 2–0 win against Clevedon Town on 16 August 1997. They initially shared at Maldon Town's Wallace Binder Ground, before moving to Billericay Town's New Lodge in January 1998. In January 2006, the club moved back to Chelmsford when they became tenants at the Melbourne Stadium, also known as Chelmsford Sport and Athletics Centre. The centre first had a track in 1934, before a cinder track was opened in 1962 alongside two seated stands on one side of the track, together holding 700 spectators. It hosted Chelmsford City Ladies matches, as the pitch inside the track was too small for men's football. The Ladies team left the ground when the stands were dismantled, although a new 270-seat stand was built in the early 2000s.

Chelmsford City announced that they would be moving to the Melbourne Stadium in March 2004. Following the announcement another stand was built on the other side of the pitch. The first game back in Chelmsford was against former landlords Billericay Town on 2 January 2006 and was played in front of a then-record crowd of 2,998. The current record attendance at Melbourne Stadium is 3,628 in an FA Cup second round game against Weston-super-Mare on 6 December 2025.

== Supporters and rivalries ==
In 1928 a supporters' club was in operation during the existence of Chelmsford F.C., the town's former amateur club. With branches in the Essex towns of Braintree, Maldon and Witham, the supporters' club had built up enough funding to improve the terracing at New Writtle Street and purchase houses to accommodate players that did not already live local to Chelmsford. On 31 August 1939, "a number of small fights" broke out, according to the Essex County Standard, following Chelmsford's 2–1 win against Colchester United at Layer Road. During the club's Southern League stay, Chelmsford regularly drew attendances of over 3,000 in the late 1950s, reaching a seasonal high average attendance of 4,438 during the 1960–61 season. In January 1968, the club recorded an attendance of 16,403 for an FA Cup tie against Colchester United. Five years later, Chelmsford declared an attendance of 15,557 in the same competition against Ipswich Town with numerous supporters being charged in regards to spectator violence. In August 1976, the two clubs once again experienced violence during a pre-season friendly at New Writtle Street. Nowadays, the club holds rivalries with Braintree Town, Billericay Town and Dartford. During both clubs' tenure in the Southern League, Chelmsford and Romford also held a rivalry.

== European record ==
In 1977 Chelmsford City were one of six clubs to represent England in the Anglo-Italian Cup. Former England international Jimmy Greaves described the 1977 Anglo-Italian Cup as the "highlight" of his time at Chelmsford City. In 1983 Chelmsford returned to Italy for a two-game stint in the Anglo-Italian Cup.

| Season | Competition | Round | Date | Opposition | Home | Away |
|---|---|---|---|---|---|---|
| 1976–77 | Anglo-Italian Cup | First stage | 27 April 1977 | (Italy) Cremonese | 1–1 | —N/a |
| 1976–77 | Anglo-Italian Cup | First stage | 30 April 1977 | (Italy) Lecco | 1–2 | —N/a |
| 1976–77 | Anglo-Italian Cup | Second stage | 22 June 1977 | (Italy) Bari | —N/a | 1–6 |
| 1976–77 | Anglo-Italian Cup | Second stage | 25 June 1977 | (Italy) Turris | —N/a | 1–2 |
| 1982–83 | Anglo-Italian Cup | Semi-final | 23 April 1983 | (Italy) Padova | —N/a | 2–4 |
| 1982–83 | Anglo-Italian Cup | Third-place play-off | 25 April 1983 | (England) Wycombe Wanderers | —N/a | 2–2 (Note: Played at Cosenza's Stadio San Vito-Gigi Marulla, Wycombe Wanderers finished third, beating Chelmsford 6–5 on penalties.) |
Source: RSSSF

== Current squad ==
As of 14 November 2026

Note: Flags indicate national team as defined under FIFA eligibility rules; some limited exceptions apply. Players may hold more than one non-FIFA nationality.

| No. | Pos. | Nation | Player |
|---|---|---|---|
| 1 | GK | ENG | Adam Hayton |
| 2 | DF | GIB | Kian Ronan |
| 3 | DF | ENG | Harry Barbrook |
| 4 | DF | ENG | Ben Tompkins |
| 5 | DF | ENG | Joe Grimwood |
| 6 | DF | ENG | Nathan Ralph |
| 7 | FW | ENG | Leo Sery |
| 8 | MF | ENG | Chay Cooper |
| 9 | FW | ENG | Kamani McFarlane |
| 10 | FW | ENG | Jack Barham |
| 11 | FW | ENG | Ricky Holmes |
| 12 | GK | ENG | Alfie Marriott (on loan from Watford) |
| 13 | GK | ENG | Billy Eastwood |

| No. | Pos. | Nation | Player |
|---|---|---|---|
| 14 | FW | ANT | Rhys Browne |
| 15 | DF | ENG | Cam Green (on loan from Solihull Moors) |
| 16 | DF | ENG | Adam Crowther |
| 17 | MF | ENG | Cav Miley (captain) |
| 18 | DF | ENG | Mandela Egbo |
| 20 | MF | IRL | Louis Dunne |
| 23 | MF | ENG | Jack Bridge |
| 24 | MF | ENG | Denzelle Olopade |
| 25 | FW | ENG | Jamie Odegah (on loan from Luton Town) |
| 26 | MF | ENG | Ben Worman (on loan from Solihull Moors) |
| 27 | FW | ENG | Ashley Clarke (on loan from Woking) |
| 33 | FW | MSR | Lyle Taylor |

== Managerial history ==
- 1938: Billy Walker
- 1938–1939: Allan Sliman
- 1939–1945: Harry Warren
- 1945–1949: Arthur Rowe
- 1949–1950: Jack Tresadern
- 1950–1951: George Smith
- 1951–1952: Billy Walsh
- 1952–1954: Ben Burley
- 1954–1955: Augie Scott
- 1955–1959: Frank Grice
- 1959–1963: Harry Ferrier
- 1963–1965: Billy Frith
- 1966: Peter Harburn
- 1966–1969: Harry Ferrier
- 1969–1970: Geoff Walker
- 1970–1974: Dave Bumpstead
- 1974–1975: Sid Prosser
- 1975: Bill Leivers
- 1975–1976: Don Walker (caretaker)
- 1976–1977: Bobby Kellard
- 1977–1978: Mick Loughton
- 1978: Ollie Hopkins
- 1978: Brian Honeywood (caretaker)
- 1978: Don Walker (caretaker)
- 1978–1979: John Newman
- 1979–1980: Don Walker
- 1980–1981: Colin Harper
- 1981: Paul Delea (caretaker)
- 1981–1984: Mick Loughton
- 1984–1985: Don Stewart (caretaker)
- 1985–1987: Joe O'Sullivan
- 1987: Don Stewart (caretaker)
- 1987–1989: Chris Symes
- 1989–1990: George Borg
- 1990–1992: Danny O'Leary
- 1992–1996: Joe O'Sullivan
- 1996: Robbie Garvey and Paul Watts
- 1996: Roy McDonough
- 1996–1998: Colin Norman and Gary Bellamy
- 1996–2001: Gary Bellamy
- 2001–2003: Paul Parker
- 2003–2004: Steve Mosely
- 2004–2005: Aidan Boxall (caretaker)
- 2005–2006: Craig Edwards
- 2006–2009: Jeff King
- 2009–2013: Glenn Pennyfather
- 2013: Dean Holdsworth
- 2013: Kenny Brown (caretaker)
- 2013–2016: Mark Hawkes
- 2016: Kevin Maher (caretaker)
- 2016–2020: Rod Stringer
- 2020–2025: Robbie Simpson
- 2025–2026: Angelo Harrop
- 2026: Ricky Holmes (caretaker)
- 2026–: Mark Cooper

== Honours ==
- Isthmian League
  - Premier Division champions 2007–08
- Southern League
  - Champions 1939–40 (joint), 1945–46, 1967–68, 1971–72
  - Division One South champions 1988–89
  - League Cup winners 1945–46, 1959–60, 1990–91
- London League
  - Champions 1930–31
- Middlesex County League
  - Champions 1923–24
- East Anglian Cup
  - Winners 1924–25, 1926–27, 1928–29
- Eastern Floodlight League
  - Winners 1966–67, 1974–75, 1977–78, 1981–82, 1982–83, 1986–87
- Eastern Floodlight League Cup
  - Winners 1972–73, 1974–75
- Essex Professional Cup
  - Winners 1957–58, 1969–70, 1970–71, 1973–74, 1974–75
- Essex Senior Cup
  - Winners 1892–93, 1901–02, 1985–86, 1988–89, 1992–93, 2002–03, 2008–09, 2016–17
- Non-League Champions Cup
  - Winners 1971–72

== Records ==
- Best FA Cup performance: Fourth round, 1938–39
- Best FA Trophy performance: Semi-finals, 1969–70
- Record attendance:
  - New Writtle Street: 16,807 vs Colchester United, Southern League, 10 September 1949
  - Melbourne Stadium: 3,628 vs Weston-super-Mare, FA Cup second round, 6 December 2025
- Lowest attendance: 120 vs Dover, Southern League, 21 December 1979
- Biggest victory: 9–0 vs Leiston, FA Cup fourth qualifying round, 3 November 1945; 9–0 vs Ruislip, Southern League Southern Division, 6 December 1988; 10–1 vs Bashley, Southern League Division One East, 26 April 2000
- Heaviest defeat: 2–10 vs Barking, FA Trophy, 11 November 1978
- Most appearances: Tony Butcher, 560 (1957–1971)
- Most goals: Tony Butcher, 286 (1957–1971)
- Record transfer fee received: £50,000 from Peterborough United for Dave Morrison, 1994
- Record transfer fee paid: Undisclosed to Barnet for Joe Grimwood, 18 June 2025
- Youngest player: John Felton; 15 years, 10 months and 26 days vs Waterlooville, 30 April 1980
- Oldest player: Peter Taylor; 42 years, 3 months and 7 days vs VS Rugby, 10 April 1995

== See also ==
- Chelmsford City F.C. players
- Chelmsford City F.C. managers
