= South Essex League =

- Founded: 1892
- First season: 1892–1893 (first iteration); 1895–1896 (second iteration)
- Folded: 1989
- Country: England
- Divisions: Two
- Domestic cup(s): FA Cup; FA Amateur Cup

The South Essex League was a football league that was held in Essex and Greater London.

== History ==
The league was formed for the 1892–93 season. Only four clubs in the league managed to fulfill all their fixtures, with Barking Excelsior winning the league and Grays Town finishing runners-up. The league was restarted in the 1895–96 season. Upon the reformation of the league in the 1895–96 season, Leyton were champions, with St Luke's placing second.

The league disbanded at the end of the 1988–89 season.

=== 1895–96 season table ===
Pos	Team	Pld	W	D	L	GF	GA	GD	Pts
1	Leyton	12	10	0	2	38	14	+24	20
2	St Luke's	12	9	1	2	43	15	+28	19
3	Leytonstone	12	8	0	4	36	21	+15	16
4	South West Ham	12	7	2	3	24	15	+9	16
5	Manor Park	12	2	3	7	19	35	−16	7
6	Forest Swifts	12	1	1	10	19	51	−32	3
7	H. M. Customs	12	1	1	10	10	38	−28	3

Source: Early Doors: Football in Southend and District 1875 to 1906

== Champions ==
=== South Essex League First Division ===
- 1892–93 – Barking Excelsior
- 1895–96 – Leyton
- 1897–98 – Leytonstone
- 1898–99 – Barking Woodville
- 1899–1900 – Leyton
- 1900–01 – West Ham United reserves
- 1901–02 – Leytonstone
- 1902–03 – Leytonstone (1A); Grays Town (1B)
- 1903–04 – Woodford (1A); Southend Athletic (1B)
- 1904–05 – Southend Athletic
- 1905–06 – South Weald
- 1906–07 – South Weald
- 1907–08 – 4th Kings Royal Rifles (1A); Shoeburyness Garrison (1B)
- 1908–09 – 4th Kings Royal Rifles
- 1909–10 – South Weald
- 1910–11 – Custom House
- 1911–12 – Barking
- 1912–13 – Colchester Town
- 1913–14 – Shoeburyness Garrison
- 1914–15 – Grays Athletic
- 1921–22 – Tilbury
- 1946–47 – Brentwood & Warley
- 1949–50 – Storey Athletic
- 1955–56 – Witham Town

=== South Essex League Second Division ===
- 1896–97 – Woodford reserves
- 1897–98 – Woodgrange Wesley
- 1898–99 – Leyton reserves
- 1899–1900 – Leyton reserves
- 1900–01 – Barking Institute
- 1901–02 – Barking Institute (2A); Leigh Town (2B)
- 1902–03 – Romford (2A); Southend Athletic (2B)
- 1903–04 – Leigh Ramblers (Eastern); Newportonians (Western)
- 1904–05 – Southend Victoria (Eastern); Barking Victoria (Western)
- 1905–06 – Leigh Ramblers (Eastern); Barking Victoria (Western)
- 1906–07 – Southend Corinthian (Eastern); South West Ham (Western)
- 1907–08 – Custom House reserves
- 1908–09 – Clapton 'A' (2A); Grays Athletic
- 1909–10 – Woodford Crusaders (2A); Beckton (2B)
- 1910–11 – Custom House reserves
- 1911–12 – Silvertown Rubber Works
- 1913–14 – Grays Athletic 'A'
- 1914–15 – Grays Athletic 'A'
- 1922–23 – Tilbury
- 1924–25 – Tilbury
- 1946–47 – Storey Athletic
- 1947–48 – Storey Athletic

== Member clubs ==
- 1st Norfolk Regiment
- 4th Kings Royal Rifles
- Ascension
- Barking
- Barking Borough
- Barking Excelsior
- Barking Institute
- Barking Victoria
- Barking Woodville
- Barking Working Men’s Institute
- Barkingside
- Basildon Town
- Bata Sports
- Beckton
- Becontree United
- Boleyn Castle
- Border Rangers
- Borough United
- Brentwood
- Brentwood & Warley
- Brentwood St. Thomas
- Brittons
- Buckhurst Hill
- Burnham Ramblers
- Canning Town
- Caterham
- Chadwell Manor
- Chelmsford
- Chelmsford Swifts
- Chingford Casuals
- Commercial Athletic
- Clapton 'A'
- Claptonians
- Crittall Athletic
- Crittall Athletic (Witham)
- Custom House
- Dagenham Cables
- Dagenham Trades
- Dagenham WMC
- Downshall Athletic
- Debden Sports
- Downshall Athletic reserves
- Colchester Town
- East Ham Town
- East Ham United
- Esso
- Fairbairn House
- Fenchurch
- Fletchers
- Forest Swifts
- Gnome Athletic
- Grange Park
- Grays Athletic
- Grays Town
- Grays United
- Great Eastern Railway Rovers
- Green and Silley Weir
- Hainault
- Heathwell United
- Heybridge Swifts
- H. M. Customs
- Hoffman Athletic
- Hope
- Ilford
- Ilford Alliance
- Ilford Electricity
- Jurgens
- Kelvedon Hatch
- Kingswood
- Leigh Ramblers
- Leigh Town
- Leyton
- Leyton Amateurs
- Leyton United
- Leytonstone
- Leytonstone United
- Limehouse Town
- London Electric
- Manor Park
- Manor Park Albion
- Mansfield House
- Mayfield
- Newmont
- Newportonians
- Peoples' Palace
- Pitfield
- P.L.A
- Product Works
- Rainham reserves
- Romford
- Romford Ivy Leafers
- Romford St. Andrew’s
- Romford Town
- Romford United
- Sandringham Central
- Shoeburyness Garrison
- Silvertown Rubber Works
- Sheppey United
- SM Tipples
- Snaresbrook
- Southend Amateurs
- Southend Athletic
- Southend Corinthian
- Southend United reserves
- Southend Victoria
- South Weald
- South West Ham
- Springfield
- St Luke's
- Staines United
- Storey Athletic
- Stork
- Stratford Y.M.C.A
- Temperance United
- Temple Mills
- Thames Ironworks
- Thames Mills
- Tilbury
- Trowbridge
- Upminster reserves
- Upton United
- Walthamstow Grange
- Walthamstow Holborn
- Wanstead
- Wanstead Amateurs
- West Ham Amateurs
- West Ham Garfield
- West Ham United reserves
- West Thurrock Athletic
- Witham Town
- Woodford
- Woodford Crusaders
- Woodford Swifts
- Woodgrange Wesley
