= Colchester Town F.C. =

English amateur football club

Colchester Town
- Full name: Colchester Town Football Club
- Nickname: The Oystermen
- Founded: October 1873
- Dissolved: December 1937
- Ground: Layer Road, Colchester
- 1937–38: Essex County League, resigned
Home colours

Colchester Town Football club was an amateur football club based in Colchester, Essex, England. Established in 1873, the club folded in 1937 after the formation of Colchester United.

== History ==
Colchester Football Club was established in October 1873 as an association football club. In 1876 the club resolved to change to rugby union rules, but played under both codes for a season, and were subsequently founder members of the Essex FA in 1882. They were the first winners of the Essex Senior Cup, defeating Braintree 3–1 in the final. In 1890 Colchester Excelsior merged into the club. The club played in the Colchester Borough League, which they won in 1894–95 but then withdrew at the end of the season. In 1899 the club was renamed Colchester Town and entered the North Essex League, in which they played for two seasons, winning it in both. They returned to the Borough League in 1901.

Despite almost folding after losing their ground in 1902, they finished as runners-up in 1902–03, by which time the league had been renamed the Colchester & District League. At the end of the season they also joined the South East Anglian League, which they played in until 1910, winning it in 1906–07. The following season they won the Colchester & District League. In 1910 they joined the South Essex League, continuing to play in the Essex & Suffolk Border League (as the Colchester & District League had been renamed in 1911), and also rejoined the East Anglian League (formerly the South East Anglian League) in 1912. In 1912–13 they were champions of all three leagues, and retained the East Anglian League title the following season.

After World War I the club left the East Anglian League, but continued to play in the South Essex and Essex & Suffolk Border leagues. In 1921 they left the South Essex League, but the following year they joined the Middlesex League, winning it in their only season. In 1923–24 the club won the Border League, and a year later joined the Spartan League. In 1935 they were founder members of the Eastern Counties League. Two years later they left to establish the Essex County League. However, Town's poor performances in the ECL had convinced supporters that the club should turn professional like nearby Ipswich Town. Officials at the club were against the idea, resulting in a new professional club, Colchester United, being formed in March 1937, which would also play at Layer Road. United joined the Southern League and crowds at Town matches quickly dwindled. In December United formed a reserve team, signing many Town players. As a result of this and financial problems (the club were £300 in debt), they folded in the same month.

== Grounds ==
The club initially played at Cambridge Road, a ground which was shared by the local lacrosse club. In 1902 the ground was built on, so the club moved to Reed Hall, not playing a home match in the 1902–03 season until 6 December. In 1903–04 they played at Drury Lodge on the junction of Drury Road and Maldon Road. The following season they moved to Spaldings Meadow in Albert Road, before moving to the Oval in Sheepen Road in 1908. A brief period at the Oval in Water Lane was followed by a move to Layer Road in April 1903. The ground was also the home of the 4th Battalion King's Royal Rifle Corps Team from 1906.

During World War I the ground was handed over to the army for use as a drill ground. Seven Town players were killed in action during the war, a tablet with their names inscribed on it was hung in the changing rooms. They were:

- Lieutenant Charles Carrington (Durham Light Infantry, 5th Btn)
- Private Will Chaplin (Suffolk Regiment, 4th Btn)
- Sgt T E Ellison
- Lance Corporal Albert Edward Pitchford (Royal Suffolk Regiment, 2nd Btn)
- Acting Bombardier Arthur Knox (Royal Horse Artillery, 1st/1st Essex Bde)
- AB W Boyle
- Sapper T W Bagley (Royal Engineers, "L" Signal Bn).

In 1919 the club bought the ground. The main stand (which remained until the ground closed) was opened in 1933. After the club folded, Colchester United took over the ground, where they remained until moving to the Colchester Community Stadium in 2008.

== Colours ==
The club originally played in red and white caps, jerseys, and stockings, but in 1875 changed to light blue, which the club wore into the 1880s. At some point the club changed to "two-blue" shirts, which it exchanged for red shirts and blue shorts in 1906.

== Honours ==
- Essex & Suffolk Border League
  - Champions 1894–95, 1907–08, 1912–13, 1923–24
- North Essex League
  - Champions 1899–1900, 1900–01
- South East Anglian League
  - Champions 1906–07
- South Essex League
  - Champions 1912–13
- East Anglian League
  - Champions 1912–13, 1913–14
- Middlesex League
  - Champions 1922–23
- Essex Senior Cup
  - Winners 1883–84
- East Anglian Cup
  - Winners 1906–07
