= Allan Sliman =

Scottish footballer and manager

Personal information
- Full name: Allan Melrose Sliman
- Date of birth: 27 February 1906
- Place of birth: Busby, Scotland
- Date of death: 14 April 1945 (aged 39)
- Place of death: Ely, England
- Position: Centre half

Senior career*
Years	Team	Apps	(Gls)
1925–1928	Arthurlie	70	(1)
1928–1932	Bristol City	136	(1)
1932–1938	Chesterfield	241	(9)
1938–1940	Chelmsford City	47	(1)
Total		494	(12)

Managerial career
- 1938–1939: Chelmsford City (player-manager)
- * Club domestic league appearances and goals

Allan Melrose Sliman (27 February 1906 – 14 April 1945), sometimes known as Jack Sliman, was a Scottish professional footballer who made over 370 Football League appearances for Chesterfield and Bristol City as a centre half. He also had a spell as player-manager of non-League club Chelmsford City.

== Career ==
A centre half, Sliman began his career with Scottish League Second Division club Arthurlie, before Bristol City manager Alex Raisbeck paid a £280 fee to bring him to the Second Division club in September 1928. After making 136 league appearances for Bristol City, Sliman joined Second Division club Chesterfield for a £1,738 fee on 4 March 1932. He remained at Saltergate until October 1938 and was a part of the club's 1935–36 Third Division South title-winning team. Sliman finished his career with Southern League club Chelmsford City during the 1938–39 season, becoming the first signing for the newly formed club. Aside from captaining the club, he held the role of player-manager between October 1938 and March 1939.

== Personal life ==
Sliman's younger brother Richard was an amateur footballer. Before and after his professional football career, he worked as a carpenter. In 1943, during the Second World War, Sliman joined the Royal Air Force Volunteer Reserve and became a flight engineer with No. 75 Squadron. On 14 April 1945, Sliman took part in his first bombing mission, targeting a location southwest of Potsdam. During the return trip to England, Sliman's bomber was attacked by Junkers Ju 88s and he was fatally wounded by cannon fire. He died in hospital in Ely and was buried in Chelmsford Cemetery.

== Career statistics ==
Appearances and goals by club, season and competition
Club	Season	League			FA Cup		Other		Total	
Club	Season	Division	Apps	Goals	Apps	Goals	Apps	Goals	Apps	Goals
Arthurlie	1925–26	Scottish Second Division	32	1	3	0	—		35	1
Arthurlie	1926–27	Scottish Second Division	20	0	0	0	—		20	0
Arthurlie	1927–28	Scottish Second Division	11	0	0	0	—		11	0
Arthurlie	1928–29	Scottish Second Division	7	0	0	0	—		7	0
Arthurlie	Total		70	1	3	0	—		73	1
Chesterfield	1931–32	Second Division	11	0	—		0	0	11	0
Chesterfield	1932–33	Second Division	39	3	4	0	1 (Note: Appearance in Derbyshire Senior Cup)	0	44	3
Chesterfield	1933–34	Third Division North	37	1	2	0	1 (Note: Appearances in Third Division North Cup)	0	40	1
Chesterfield	1934–35	Third Division North	39	3	1	0	5 (Note: 4 appearances and 1 goal in Third Division North Cup, 1 appearance in Derbyshire Senior Cup)	1	44	4
Chesterfield	1935–36	Third Division North	42	1	3	0	5 (Note: 2 appearances in Third Division North Cup, 1 appearance in Derbyshire Senior Cup, 1 appearance in Chesterfield Hospital Senior Cup)	0	50	1
Chesterfield	1936–37	Second Division	41	1	1	1	3 (Note: 1 appearance in Derbyshire Senior Cup, 1 appearance in Chesterfield Hospital Senior Cup, 1 appearance in Mansfield Charity Cup)	0	45	2
Chesterfield	1937–38	Second Division	32	0	6	1	0	0	38	1
Chesterfield	Total		241	9	17	2	15	1	273	12
Career total			311	10	20	3	15	1	346	14

== Honours ==
Chesterfield

- Football League Third Division North: 1935–36
- Derbyshire Senior Cup: 1932–33, 1936–37
- Chesterfield Hospital Senior Cup: 1935–36, 1936–37
- Mansfield Charity Cup: 1936–37
