= Lamar Johnson =

Lamar Johnson may refer to:

- Lamar Johnson (actor) (born 1994), Canadian actor and dancer
- Lamar Johnson (baseball) (born 1950), American baseball player and coach
- Lamar Johnson (footballer) (born 1991), English footballer

== See also ==
- Lamar Johnstone, American silent film actor and director
