= South Weald F.C. =

Defunct association football club in England

South Weald
- Full name: South Weald Football Club
- Dissolved: 1912; 113 years ago
- Ground: Warley Road, Brentwood
- Final season; 1911–12: South Essex League First Division, 8th of 9
Home colours

South Weald Football Club was a football club based in Brentwood, England.

== History ==
In 1900, South Weald joined the Romford & District League, later joining the South Essex League, winning two consecutive titles in 1906 and 1907. In the 1905–06 season, South Weald entered the FA Cup for the first time, losing 4–1 against Bristolian club Staple Hill, who played Manchester United away in the following round, losing 7–2. During the early 20th century, South Weald competeted in six Essex Senior Cup finals in nine seasons, winning the competition in 1907 and 1910. In 1908, South Weald joined the Spartan League, before rejoining the South Essex League, winning the league in 1910. In 1912, the club folded after being suspended from the Essex FA, due to fielding an ineligible player in the Romford Charity Cup. Prior to folding, South Weald were due to join the newly formed Athenian League.

== Colours ==
The club wore blue and white hoops.

== Ground ==
South Weald played on Warley Road in Brentwood, erecting a canvas screen in 1902 on the Woodman Road side of the ground to prevent the public viewing games for free.

== Records ==
- Best FA Cup performance: Fourth qualifying round, 1905–06

== Honours ==
- South Essex League
  - First Division champions: 1905–06, 1906–07, 1909–10
- Essex Senior Cup
  - Winners: 1906–07, 1909–10
  - Runners-up: 1903–04, 1905–06, 1910–11, 1911–12
