= 1906–07 Isthmian League =

The 1906–07 Isthmian League season was the second in the history of the Isthmian League, an English football competition. Ilford won the title. At the end of the season Casuals, Civil Service and Ealing Association resigned from the league.

== League table ==
Isthmian League
- Season: 1906–07
- Champions: Ilford
- Matches: 30
- Goals: 101 (3.37 per match)

Pos	Team	Pld	W	D	L	GF	GA	GR	Pts	Results
1	Ilford	10	8	2	0	26	9	2.889	18	
2	London Caledonians	10	6	0	4	19	14	1.357	12	
3	Clapton	10	4	3	3	18	11	1.636	11	
4	Civil Service	10	3	1	6	11	19	0.579	7	Left the league at end of the season
5	Ealing Association	10	3	1	6	12	22	0.545	7	Left the league at end of the season
6	Casuals	10	2	1	7	15	26	0.577	5	Left the league at end of the season

Source: fchd.com rsssf.com
Rules for classification: 1) points; 2) goal ratio.
