= 2008–09 Essex Senior Football League =

The 2008–09 season was the 38th in the history of Essex Senior Football League a football competition in England.

The league featured 15 clubs which competed in the league last season, along with one new club:

- Takeley, promoted from the Essex Olympian League

Romford were champions, winning their second Essex Senior League title and returned to the Isthmian League after seven seasons in the Essex Senior League.

== League table ==
Essex Senior Football League
- Season: 2008–09
- Champions: Romford
- Promoted: Romford
- Matches: 240
- Goals: 820 (3.42 per match)

Pos	Team	Pld	W	D	L	GF	GA	GD	Pts	Promotion or relegation
1	Romford	30	21	8	1	79	25	+54	71	Promoted to the Isthmian League
2	Enfield 1893	30	21	1	8	62	29	+33	64	
3	Takeley	30	19	4	7	59	37	+22	61	
4	Southend Manor	30	16	7	7	65	41	+24	55	
5	Barkingside	30	13	7	10	48	51	−3	46	
6	Basildon United	30	14	3	13	53	50	+3	45	
7	Eton Manor	30	12	8	10	52	40	+12	44	
8	Burnham Ramblers	30	12	7	11	62	50	+12	43	
9	Hullbridge Sports	30	11	8	11	44	46	−2	41	
10	Stansted	30	12	4	14	57	50	+7	40	
11	Bowers & Pitsea	30	11	7	12	35	35	0	37 (Note: Bowers & Pitsea were deducted three points.)	
12	Barking	30	8	7	15	45	62	−17	31	
13	Sawbridgeworth Town	30	8	5	17	43	70	−27	29	
14	London APSA	30	7	5	18	34	67	−33	25 (Note: London APSA were deducted one point.)	
15	Mauritius Sports & Pennant	30	4	8	18	42	76	−34	20	
16	Clapton	30	5	3	22	40	91	−51	18	

Source: fchd
Rules for classification: 1) points; 2) goal difference; 3) number of goals scored.
