= 2024 FA Vase final =

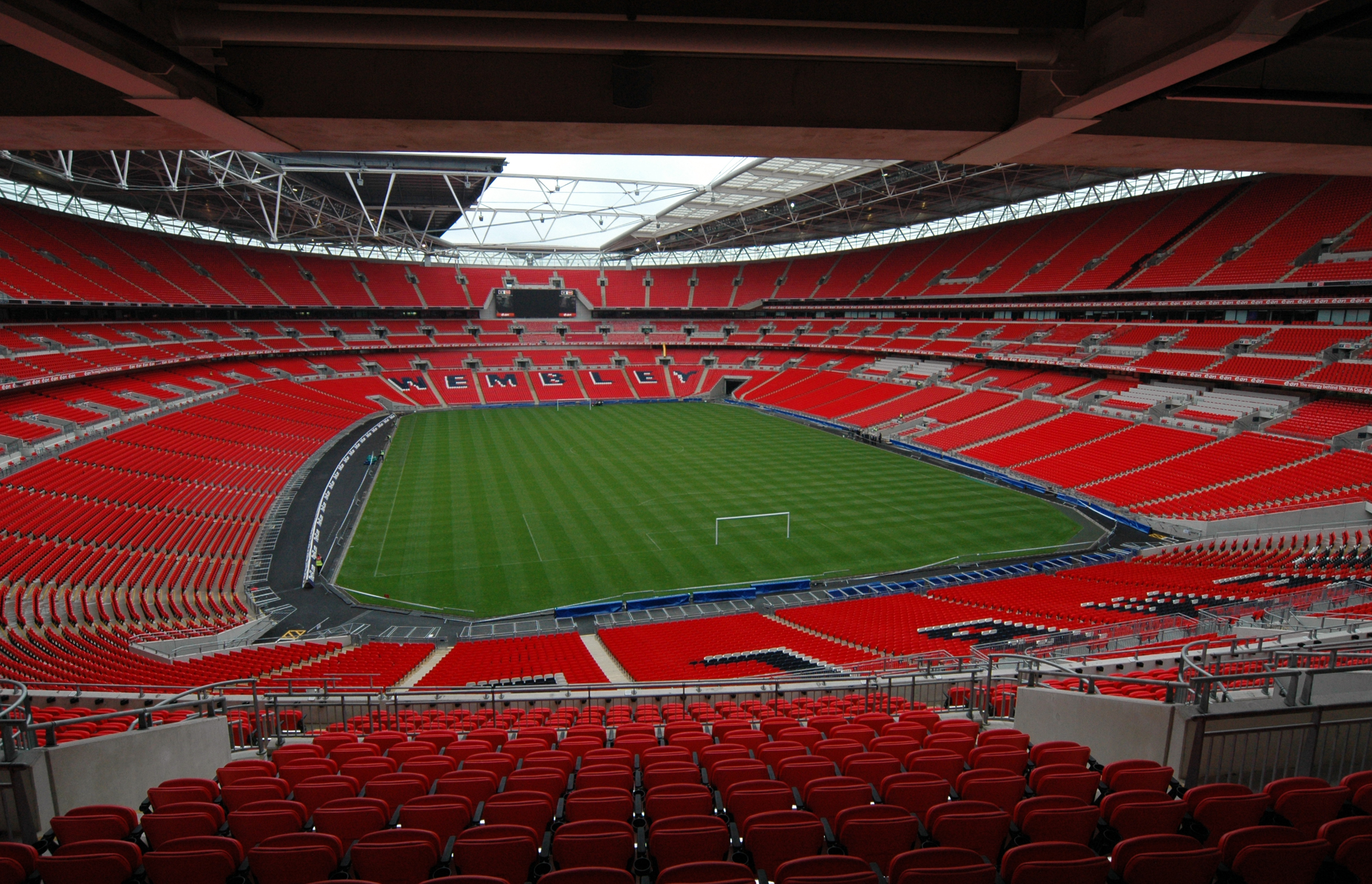
- Wembley Stadium hosted the final
- Event: 2023–24 FA Vase
Great Wakering Rovers	Romford
0	3
- Date: 11 May 2024
- Venue: Wembley Stadium, London
- Referee: Will Finnie

The 2024 FA Vase final was the 50th final of the Football Association's cup competition for teams at levels 9–11 of the English football league system. The match was contested between Great Wakering Rovers and Romford, both of the Essex Senior League. Both clubs appeared in their first final.

As part of Non-League Finals Day, the final of the FA Trophy was played on the same day at the same venue.

== Route to the Final ==
=== Great Wakering Rovers ===
26 August 2023 First Qualifying Round	Basildon Town	2–5	Great Wakering Rovers	Corringham
15:00 BST				Stadium: Rookery Hill; Attendance: 72

23 September 2023 Second Qualifying Round	Great Wakering Rovers	4–3	Buckhurst Hill	Great Wakering
15:00 BST				Stadium: Burroughs Park; Attendance: 66

21 October 2023 First Round	St Neots Town	2–2 (2–4 p)	Great Wakering Rovers	St Neots
15:00 BST				Stadium: Rowley Park; Attendance: 227

11 November 2023 Second Round	Great Wakering Rovers	2–0	Downham Town	Great Wakering
15:00 GMT				Stadium: Burroughs Park; Attendance: 128

16 December 2023 Third Round	Fakenham Town	0–3	Great Wakering Rovers	Great Wakering
15:00 GMT				Stadium: Burroughs Park; Attendance: 112
Note: Match played at Great Wakering Rovers

13 January 2024 Fourth Round	Whitchurch Alport	1–2	Great Wakering Rovers	Whitchurch
15:00 GMT				Stadium: Yockings Park; Attendance: 230

17 February 2024 Fifth Round	Highworth Town	2–3	Great Wakering Rovers	Highworth
15:00 GMT				Stadium: The Elms Recreation Ground; Attendance: 365

9 March 2024 Quarter-Final	Great Wakering Rovers	2–0	Falmouth Town	Great Wakering
15:00 GMT				Stadium: Burroughs Park; Attendance: 694

6 April 2024 Semi-Final First Leg	Worcester City	1–0	Great Wakering Rovers	Worcester
15:00 BST	Hartley 77'			Stadium: Sixways Stadium; Attendance: 3,189

13 April 2024 Semi-Final Second Leg	Great Wakering Rovers	2–1 (2–2 agg.) (5–4 p)	Worcester City	Great Wakering
15:00 BST	Gordon 13'; Gnandi 83'		Hart 34'	Stadium: Burroughs Park; Attendance: 1,502
	Penalties
	Boylan (penalty scored); Johnson (penalty scored); Talbot (penalty scored); Martin (penalty missed); Gordon (penalty scored); Nolde (penalty scored)		Insall (penalty scored); Reid (penalty scored); Mace (penalty scored); Belmonte (penalty missed); Dinsley (penalty scored); Knight (penalty missed)

=== Romford ===
11 November 2023 Second Round	Romford	2–0	Crawley Green	Corringham
15:00 GMT				Stadium: Rookery Hill; Attendance: 103

2 December 2023 Third Round	Romford	3–0	Mildenhall Town	Corringham
15:00 GMT				Stadium: Rookery Hill; Attendance: 88

13 January 2024 Fourth Round	Romford	2–1	Stanway Pegasus	Corringham
15:00 GMT				Stadium: Rookery Hill; Attendance: 159

10 February 2024 Fifth Round	Hilltop	1–3	Romford	Cobham
15:00 GMT				Stadium: Leg O' Mutton Field; Attendance: 220

9 March 2024 Quarter-Final	North Greenford United	0–1	Romford	Greenford
15:00 GMT				Stadium: Berkeley Fields; Attendance: 379

30 March 2024 Semi-Final First Leg	Romford	2–2	Lincoln United	Corringham
15:00 GMT	Dorrell 57'; Siddik 90+4'		Cotton 11'; Dye 90'	Stadium: Rookery Hill; Attendance: 561

6 April 2024 Semi-Final Second Leg	Lincoln United	0–0 (2–2 agg.) (9–10 p)	Romford	Lincoln
15:00 BST				Stadium: Ashby Avenue; Attendance: 1,475

== Match ==
=== Details ===
11 May 2024
12:15 BST

Romford (9)	3–0	Great Wakering Rovers (9)
Nalbant 53, 90+4'; Deering 55'

Wembley Stadium, London
Attendance: 19,964
Referee: Will Finne

Assistant referees:
Johnathon Bickerdike (West Riding)
Steve Durnall (Birmingham)
Fourth official:
Adam Herczeg (Durham)
