= Leyton F.C. =

Leyton
- Full name: Leyton Football Club
- Nicknames: The Lilywhites (or Lillies), The Swifts
- Founded: 1868 (reformed 1997)
- Dissolved: 2011
- Ground: Leyton Stadium, London
- Capacity: 4,000
- 2010–11: Isthmian League; Division One North, resigned
Home colours	Away colours

Leyton Football Club was an English association football club based in Leyton, in the London Borough of Waltham Forest. The club withdrew from the Isthmian League Division One North in January 2011 due to severe financial difficulties, and disbanded. The first club to go by the name was founded in 1868, and the last incarnation of the club, which began playing in 1997, won a High Court action in 2002 in support of its claim to be a continuation of the original team, making it at that stage the second-oldest existing club in Greater London, after Cray Wanderers.

The team played in white shirts with blue shorts and white socks and were nicknamed the Lilywhites or Lillies. The club were unrelated to their Football League neighbours Leyton Orient, although Orient moved into their Brisbane Road stadium after Leyton moved out in 1937.

== History ==
The club was originally founded in 1868, and disbanded several times (late 1890s, 1911, 1914 and 2011) during its history. In 1975, the club merged with Wingate F.C. to become Leyton-Wingate F.C. until 1992 when the two clubs parted company and the name reverted to Leyton. In 1995 the club merged with Walthamstow Pennant and moved away from Leyton Stadium to become Leyton Pennant F.C., who are now known as Walthamstow.

A new Leyton Football Club was established in 1997, and following a High Court case in 2002, won the right to be recognised as a continuation of the original club. A statement by lawyers Richard West Freeman Christofi reads:

by Order of the High Court Chancery Division dated 26 July 2002, in an action brought against Leyton Pennant Football Club and the Football Association, Leyton Football Club (now incorporated as a Limited Company) of Wingate Stadium Lea Bridge Road Leyton has effectively been restored as Leyton Football Club, the unincorporated club formed in 1868; has had its membership to the FA restored; has had its history dating back to 1868 restored and the order also requires Leyton Pennant to refrain in any way from holding itself out to being Leyton Football Club.

At the beginning of the new millennium Leyton won back-to-back promotions, winning the Essex Senior League in 2001–02 then finishing second in the Isthmian League Second Division the following season. In 2003–04 Leyton finished second in the Isthmian League First Division North, gaining a place in the new Isthmian League Premier Division for the following season as the non-league pyramid was reconstructed. In 2004–05 Leyton finished fifth in the Isthmian Premier Division and reached the final of the play-offs for promotion to the Conference South, but the Lilywhites were beaten 2–1 in the final by Eastleigh.

Costas Sophocleous, the club chairman, was once the manager. Having managed the team for the 2003–04 and 2004–05 seasons, Sophocleous decided to step back from management to concentrate on his role as chairman. Following a bad start to the season, however, two managers were sacked in quick succession and the chairman took over the managerial role again.

Leyton then appointed Troy Townsend as manager for the 2005–06 season. He continued to manage the first team squad, the reserves side (which competed in the Capital League) and the Eastern Junior Alliance U18s squad.

In 2006–07 Leyton completed the season in 15th position. This led Troy Townsend to step aside as manager of the first team to concentrate on the reserves and U18s sides. The following season, under manager Rowley Cray, the club suffered an 11–1 home defeat to Hendon and a 9–0 loss at AFC Hornchurch en route to relegation.

Steve Newing and Del Deanus (previously at Edgware Town) were appointed as joint managers for the 2008–09 season, but resigned in November citing financial difficulties at the club. Tony Ievoli then took the reins but he resigned at the start of September 2009, before being replaced by former Grays Athletic manager, Craig Edwards. In November 2009 Edwards was replaced by Ivan Persaud.

In October 2009, following an investigation by HMRC, chairman Costas Sophocleous and former director Philip Foster pleaded guilty to their parts in a £16 million VAT fraud. In January 2010 Sophocleous was sentenced to 8 years 3 months and Foster to 5 years 3 months. Sophocleous' son, former Leyton player Mark, and his wife, Alison, were found not guilty of associated money laundering charges. Accountant Stewart Collins was found guilty and sentenced to 6 years. Sophocleous stood down as chairman and was replaced by former vice-chairman Tony Hardy.

Following Costas Sophocleous' conviction, Ivan Persaud left the club and was replaced as manager by former player Malcolm Dannie for the beginning of February 2010.

The team's inability to win a game in his tenure led to Dannie leaving and being replaced by former Ashford Town Middlesex Reserve Team manager Wilson Frimpong for the final six games of the season, during which time the team went unbeaten but still failed narrowly to avoid finishing 21st and in the relegation zone. However, because several clubs higher in the pyramid were dissolved or demoted, Leyton were awarded a reprieve and remained in the Isthmian League Division One North division for the 2010–11 season.

In January 2011, and after a short suspension from the league for not paying its subscription, the club was forced to withdraw from the league due to debt. Following this, the chairman, secretary, management and players all left the club, effectively ending its existence.

In the summer of 2017, a group of Dutch investors made an attempt to revive the club under the name Leyton 1868 FC. Going as far as hosting behind-closed-doors friendlies, however by November 2017 the project had fallen through.

== Stadium ==
Leyton F.C. played at the Leyton Stadium (previously known as the Hare and Hounds, and before that as the Wingate-Leyton Stadium). At its height the club had ten youth teams, ranging in age from under nines to under eighteens, and ran a Football in the Community scheme for local schools.

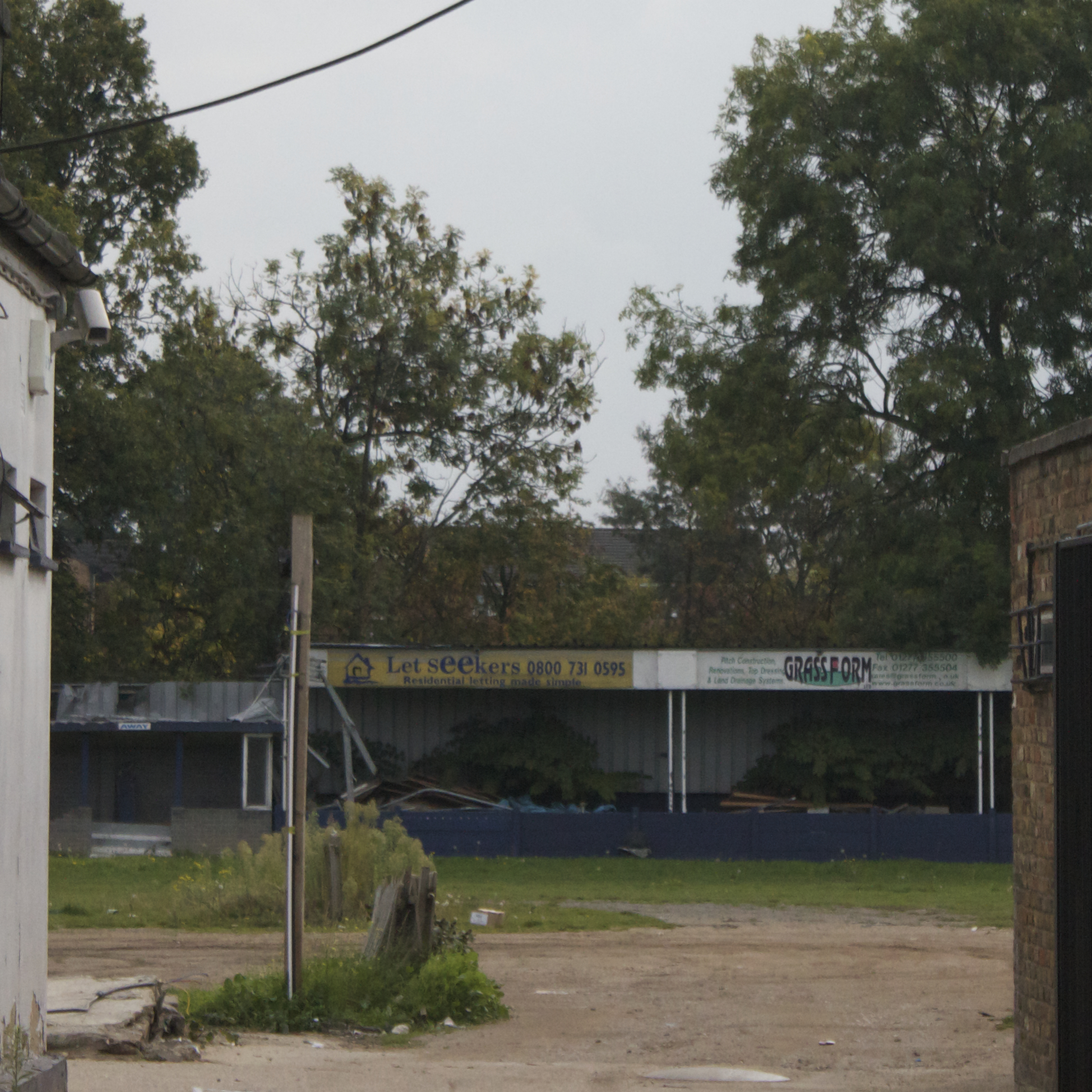
The remains of the main entrance to Leyton's stadium

== Honours ==
As Leyton FC (founded 1868)

- Athenian League: 1928–29, 1965–66, 1966–67
  - Runners-up: 1945–46, 1964–65
- Essex Senior Cup: 1896–97, 1897–1898, 1899–1900, 1900–01, 1902–03, 1929–30, 1930–31, 1934–35
- FA Amateur Cup: 1926–27, 1927–28
  - Runners-up: 1933–34, 1936–37, 1951–52
- London Charity Cup: 1934–35, 1936–37
- London League: 1923–24, 1924–25
- London Senior Cup: 1903–04, 1925–26
- South Essex League: 1895–96, 1899–1900
- South East League: 1896–97

As Leyton Wingate FC (renamed 1975)

- Athenian League: 1976–77, 1981–82
  - Runners-up: 1977–78
- Essex Thamesside Trophy: 1981–82
- Isthmian League Division Two North: 1984–85
- Runners-up Isthmian League Division One: 1986–87

As Leyton FC (renamed 1992)

- Essex Thamesside Trophy: 1992–93

As Leyton FC (reformed 1997)

- Essex Senior League: 2001–02
- Essex Senior League Cup : 2001–02
- Runners-up Isthmian League Division Two: 2002–03
- Isthmian League Associate Members Cup : 2002–03
- Runners-up Isthmian League Division One North: 2003–04

== See also ==
- Football in London
