= Ilford F.C. =

Association football club in England

Coordinates: 51°33′35.910″N 0°5′27.899″E

Ilford
- Full name: Ilford Football Club
- Nickname: The Foxes
- Founded: 1881 (original club); 1987 (modern club)
- Ground: Cricklefield Stadium, Ilford
- Capacity: 3,500 (216 seated)
- Chairman: Adam Peek
- Manager: Chris Davis and Ray Bartlett
- League: Essex Senior League
- 2024–25: Essex Senior League, 15th of 20
| Home colours | Away colours |

Ilford Football Club is a football club based in Ilford, East London, England. Affiliated to the Essex County Football Association, they are currently members of the Essex Senior League and play at the Cricklefield Stadium. Nicknamed the Foxes, the club play in blue and white hoops or stripes.

== History ==
The original Ilford Football Club was established in 1881 by a group of teenagers. They were founder members of the Southern League in 1894, joining Division One. They finished bottom of Division One in 1895–96, losing all 18 matches and subsequently faced a promotion-relegation test match against Wolverton LNWR; after losing 2–0, Ilford resigned from the league. They then became founder members of the London League, where they were placed in Division One for the 1896–97 season. However, they also left the London League after two season, this time joining Division One of the South Essex League. In 1900–01 the club won the London Senior Cup, beating Clapton 2–1 in the final. They won the competition again in 1904–05, winning the final against Ealing Association by the same scoreline.

In 1905 Ilford were founder members of the Isthmian League, which their treasurer George Clarke had played a key role in establishing. Although the club finished bottom of the table in the league's first season, they were champions the following season and runners-up in 1911–12. The club won the London Senior Cup for a third time in 1913–14, defeating Nunhead 2–0 in a replay after the initial final ended 1–1. Following World War I, they were runners-up in the 1919 season and then won back-to-back league titles in 1920–21 and 1921–22, also winning the London Senior Cup in the latter season with a 3–1 win over Nunhead in the final. In 1925–26 the club reached the first round of the FA Cup for the first time; after beating London Caledonians 2–1, they lost 1–0 at Clapton in the second round. The club went on to finish as league runners-up in 1926–27, and reached the second round of the FA Cup again the following season, losing 5–3 at Exeter City.

In 1928–29 Ilford reached the final of the FA Amateur Cup, going on to beat Leyton 3–1 at Highbury in front of a crowd of 35,000. The club also won the London Senior Cup, defeating London Caledonians 4–1 in the final. They retained both trophies next season, beating Bournemouth Gasworks Athletic 5–1 in the FA Amateur Cup final at Upton Park, and defeating Walthamstow Avenue 4–1 in the London Senior Cup final. The club were Isthmian League runners-up again in 1931–32, and reached a third FA Amateur Cup final in 1935–36. However, after the first match at Crystal Palace against Casuals ended in a 1–1 draw, they lost the replay at Upton Park 2–0. The club finished as Isthmian League runners-up in 1937–38 and again the following season.

In 1953–54 Ilford won the London Senior Cup again, defeating Hounslow Town 2–0 in the final. In 1957–58 they were FA Cup Amateur finalists for a fourth time, losing 3–0 to Woking at Wembley Stadium. Another appearance in the FA Cup first round the following season ended with a 3–1 defeat at Norwich City. In 1973–74 the club reached the final of the last edition of the FA Amateur Cup, losing 4–1 to Bishop's Stortford at Wembley. The following season the club reached the second round of the FA Cup, losing 2–0 at home to Southend United.

With plans in place to build a new ground in Fairlop, Ilford moved to Leytonstone's Granleigh Road ground in 1977. However, land development tax from the sale of their Lynn Road ground had not been considered in the budget and the club were left with insufficient funds to build a new ground. Instead they merged with Leytonstone in 1979 to form Leytonstone/Ilford. The new club later merged with Walthamstow Avenue to form Redbridge Forest, who in turn merged with Dagenham to form the modern Dagenham & Redbridge.

Ilford Football Club was resurrected as a separate entity in 1987. They joined Division One of the Spartan League in 1988. However, issues including a lack of finance, manpower and home ground led to the club leaving the league in 1990. Although they returned in 1993, they left at the end of the 1993–94 season. After a further two seasons in abeyance, the club joined the Essex Senior League in 1996. They were Essex Senior League runners-up in 2003–04, earning promotion to Division Two of the Isthmian League. They won Division Two at the first attempt, and were promoted to the Eastern Division of the Southern League.

After a single season in the Southern League, Ilford were transferred back to the Isthmian League, joining Division One North. They finished in the bottom three for six of the next seven seasons, before being relegated back to the Essex Senior League at the end of the 2012–13 season, in which they had finished bottom of Division One North. In June 2017 the club were voted out of the Essex Senior League due to the non-payment of fines. However, they were readmitted to the league in July following an appeal.

== Ground ==
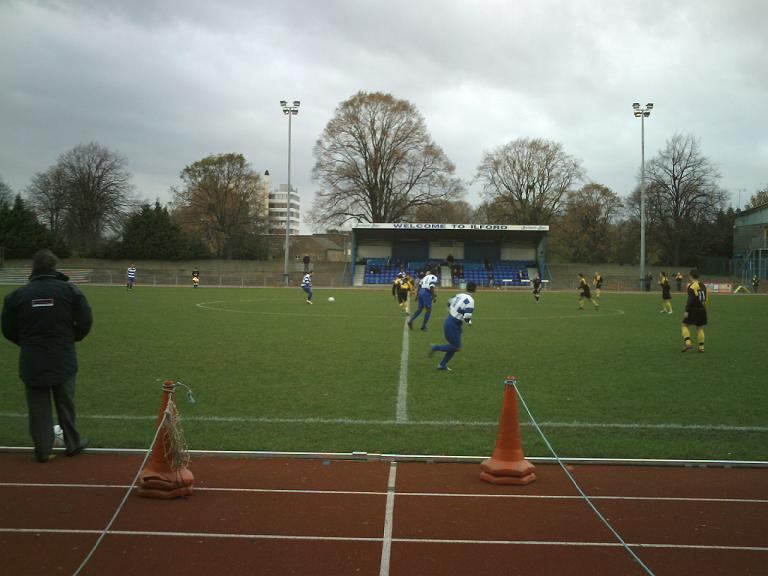
Cricklefield Stadium's main stand in 2007

The original Ilford were playing at the Ilford Sports Ground by the time they joined the Southern League in 1894. However, after being given notice to leave the site in 1904 as it was to be used for housing, the club leased four acres of land to the north of Ilford, where the ground that became known as Lynn Road was built. Lynn Road was used for FA Amateur Cup semi-finals, and during the 1948 Summer Olympics to host two matches in the football tournament. In 1977 the club moved to Leytonstone's Granleigh Road ground whilst a new ground was planned to be built in Fairlop.

After reforming, the modern Ilford struggled to secure a permanent ground, groundsharing at Barking East Ham United and Southgate Olympic, as well as playing at the Douglas Eyre leisure complex in Walthamstow and two matches at the council-owned Cricklefield Stadium in 1989. However, in 1994 the club made a permanent move to the Cricklefield Stadium in 1993. Cricklefield had been opened in 1925 as an athletics ground. During World War II it was used as a balloon landing site and following the war the ground was rebuilt and reopened on 27 May 1950.

== Honours ==
- FA Amateur Cup
  - Winners 1928–29, 1929–30
- Isthmian League
  - Champions 1906–07, 1920–21, 1921–22
  - Division Two champions 2004–05
- Essex Senior League
  - League Cup winners 2002–03
- London Senior Cup
  - Winners 1900–01, 1904–05, 1913–14, 1921–22, 1928–29, 1929–30, 1953–54

== Records ==
- Best FA Cup performance: Second round, 1925–26, 1927–28, 1974–75
- Best FA Trophy performance: Third round, 1974–75
- Best FA Vase performance: Second round, 1999–2000, 2004–05, 2020–21

== See also ==
- Ilford F.C. players
- Ilford F.C. managers
