= Layer Road =

Former football stadium in Colchester, England

Coordinates: 51°52′37″N 0°53′0″E

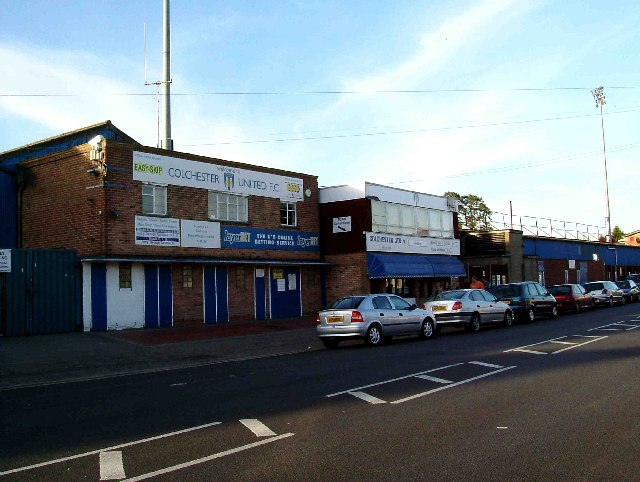
- Layer Road in October 2005
- Interactive map of Layer Road
- Location: Layer Road, Colchester, England
- Owner: Colchester United F.C.
- Capacity: 6,320 (2,040 seated)
- Surface: Grass

Construction
- Built: 1907
- Opened: 1907
- Closed: 2008
- Demolished: 2012

Tenants
- Colchester United (1937-2008); Colchester Town (1907-1937)

Layer Road was a Football League stadium in Colchester, England. It was the home of Colchester United Football Club from its inception in 1937, up until the club relocated to Colchester Community Stadium in 2008, resulting in its closure. The stadium held 6,320 spectators by the time of its closure, and was built in 1907, originally for use by Colchester Town Football Club.

The record attendance at Layer Road is 19,072 for an FA Cup fixture against Reading in November 1948, a match that was abandoned due to fog. The ground was also used to host Sudbury Town's FA Cup match against Brentford in 1996, as their Priory Stadium was deemed unfit. One of the unusual features of the ground was at the Layer Road End, where the back of the goal and the netting actually cut back into the stand.

The most recent development to the ground was the construction of a small, temporary seating stand for housing away supporters. It held 143 supporters and was similar to the chocolate boxes at The Dell.

The last first team match at Layer Road took place on 26 April 2008, when Colchester lost 1–0 to Stoke City, with Richard Cresswell scoring the last goal at the stadium.

Just three days after the first team farewell, Layer Road hosted a Pontins Holiday Combination reserve league fixture on Tuesday 29 April 2008 when 471 witnessed Colchester United beat Peterborough United 3-0 in the last competitive game at the ground with the floodlights being used for the final time.

Dulwich Hamlet youth team were invited to a behind closed doors friendly on 11 July 2008 where Colchester won 7-0 in what became the final game of football ever played at Layer Road.

The stadium was locked for the last time on 17 July 2008 after 101 years in use, with 71 years as the home of Colchester United.

In 2011, Colchester Borough Council sold the 3.63 acre stadium site to developer Abbey New Homes in a deal worth approximately £1.5 million. Planning permission was subsequently granted to build 58 homes on the site, a mixture of flats and houses, with a central open grassed space to be left to reflect its history as a football ground, and as a mark of respect to supporters who had their ashes scattered on the pitch as an expression of their love for the club. In mid-2012, Layer Road was demolished with the construction of houses commencing immediately.

A bronze statue of former player Peter Wright was unveiled at the centre of the new development in 2015 by his widow Lindsey and Sir Bob Russell MP, following Wright being voted Colchester United’s Player of the Century by supporters in 2000. The statue signifies that the site was home to Colchester United for seventy years and commemorates Wright, a player who joined the club in 1951, making over 400 appearances and scoring 93 goals over a 13 year spell. The statue unveiling ceremony saw around 150 in attendance, including then-current Colchester United captain Magnus Okuonghae, along with many people associated with the club both past and present. The statue was made by local artist Mandy Pratt and cast at Butterfly Bronze Foundry in Romford by Will Hayes.
