= Danny Benstock =

English footballer

Personal information
- Full name: Danny Benstock
- Date of birth: 10 July 1970 (age 56)
- Place of birth: Hackney, England
- Position: Midfielder

Youth career
- 1987–1988: Gillingham

Senior career*
Years	Team	Apps	(Gls)
1988–1990	Enfield	32	(6)
1990–1992	Barking	109	(27)
1992–1994	Leyton Orient	21	(0)
- Purfleet
- Collier Row & Romford
- Bishop's Stortford
- Ford United
- * Club domestic league appearances and goals

Danny Benstock (born 10 July 1970 in Hackney, London, England), is an English footballer who played as a midfielder. He played in the Football League for Leyton Orient.
