= Romford F.C. =

Association football club in Essex, England

Coordinates: 51°32′51″N 0°06′41″E

Romford FC
- Full name: Romford Football Club
- Nickname: The Boro
- Founded: 1876; 150 years ago
- Ground: Mayesbrook Park, Dagenham
- Capacity: 2,500 (250 seated)
- Chairman: Sean Desmond
- Manager: Vacant
- League: Essex Senior League
- 2025–26: Essex Senior League, 14th of 20
- Website: www.romfordfc.com
Home colours	Away colours

Romford Football Club is an English football club based in Romford, London. The club are currently members of the Essex Senior League and play at Mayesbrook Park in Dagenham, East London

== History ==
The original Romford was established in 1876. They reached the quarter-finals of the FA Cup in 1880–81, but lost 15–0 at Darwen, hampered by playing a dribbling game on a slushy pitch; Darwen also had four goals disallowed.

There was no league football for them to play until they joined the South Essex League in 1896. An internal dispute saw several committee and players leave to form a new club in 1909, called Romford United and competing directly against Romford in the South Essex League at a ground literally across the road. The original club continued under new management and joined the Southern League while still playing in the South Essex League, but played only a single season before leaving.

The new regime at the original club proved disastrous, being expelled from the South Essex League during the 1910/11 season and subsequently folding, leaving Romford United as the only club with the town's name. They changed to Romford Town and joined the Athenian League, but finished bottom in their first season and left at the end of their second, before closing down during World War I. Romford Town had remained members of the South Essex League and returned to action after the war, but lack of support saw them withdraw in December 1920 and fold. For the rest of the 1920s the only club under the Romford name was Romford Town Thursday, playing on Thursday afternoons at Brooklands, a ground previously used by Romford's reserve team.

In 1929 the club was re-established. Taking over the use of the Brooklands Stadium, they joined the London League. In 1931 they moved to the Athenian League, which they won in 1935–36 and 1936–37. Following World War II the club transferred to the Isthmian League. In 1948–49 they reached the final of the FA Amateur Cup, but lost 1–0 to Bromley in front of 100,000 spectators in the first final to be held at Wembley Stadium. In 1959 they switched to Division One of the Southern League. They were promoted to the Premier Division in their first season after finishing second, and won the Premier Division in 1966–67. The club made several applications to join the Football League, but were never successful in the elections. In 1974–75 they finished second bottom of the Premier Division, and were relegated to Division One. By this time the club had developed Brooklands considerably in anticipation of eventually being elected to the Football League and had large debts to show for it, and had to sell Brooklands in 1975 but remained until 1977. After a season of borrowing grounds to play home matches they resigned from the Southern League and folded in 1978, with the building work on a new ground barely started and hardly any money left.

In 1992 the club was resurrected for a second time and joined the Essex Senior League. They won the league in 1995–96, and in the summer merged with Collier Row (with whom they had been groundsharing since April) to form Collier Row & Romford. The new club took Collier Row's place in Division Two of the Isthmian League, which they won in their first season. In the summer of 1997 they were renamed Romford.

In 2000–01 they finished second bottom of Division One and were relegated to Division Two. After finishing bottom the following season they resigned to go back to the Essex Senior League. They returned to the Isthmian League after winning the Essex Senior League in 2008–09, and remained in Division One North for over a decade. Despite a difficult year in 2017–18, they were able to survive despite being five points adrift with just two games remaining. The following season they found themselves in a possibly even worse situation as they were nine points short of safety with five games remaining, but staged a late recovery only to fall short on goal difference behind Witham Town. However the knock-on effect of the mid-season demise of North Ferriby United meant Romford were reprieved from relegation to fill the vacancy.

In November 2019, the club appointed former Billericay Town owner Glenn Tamplin as manager and investor, who immediately signed multiple players on his first day. Under Tamplin Romford had a difficult time, largely because of the unavailability of the waterlogged Brentwood pitch which they were unable to use after Tamplin's first match, and a huge turnover of players but eventually recovered enough ground to move off the bottom of the table in March just as the season was brought to a premature end by the coronavirus pandemic. The following season Romford moved on again to Barking but with a resurgence of coronavirus cases the season was suspended in November with Boro in mid-table then eventually curtailed in February. Shortly after, Tamplin announced he was leaving the club, but his assistants Christos Mead and Derek Duncan would remain in charge of the team.

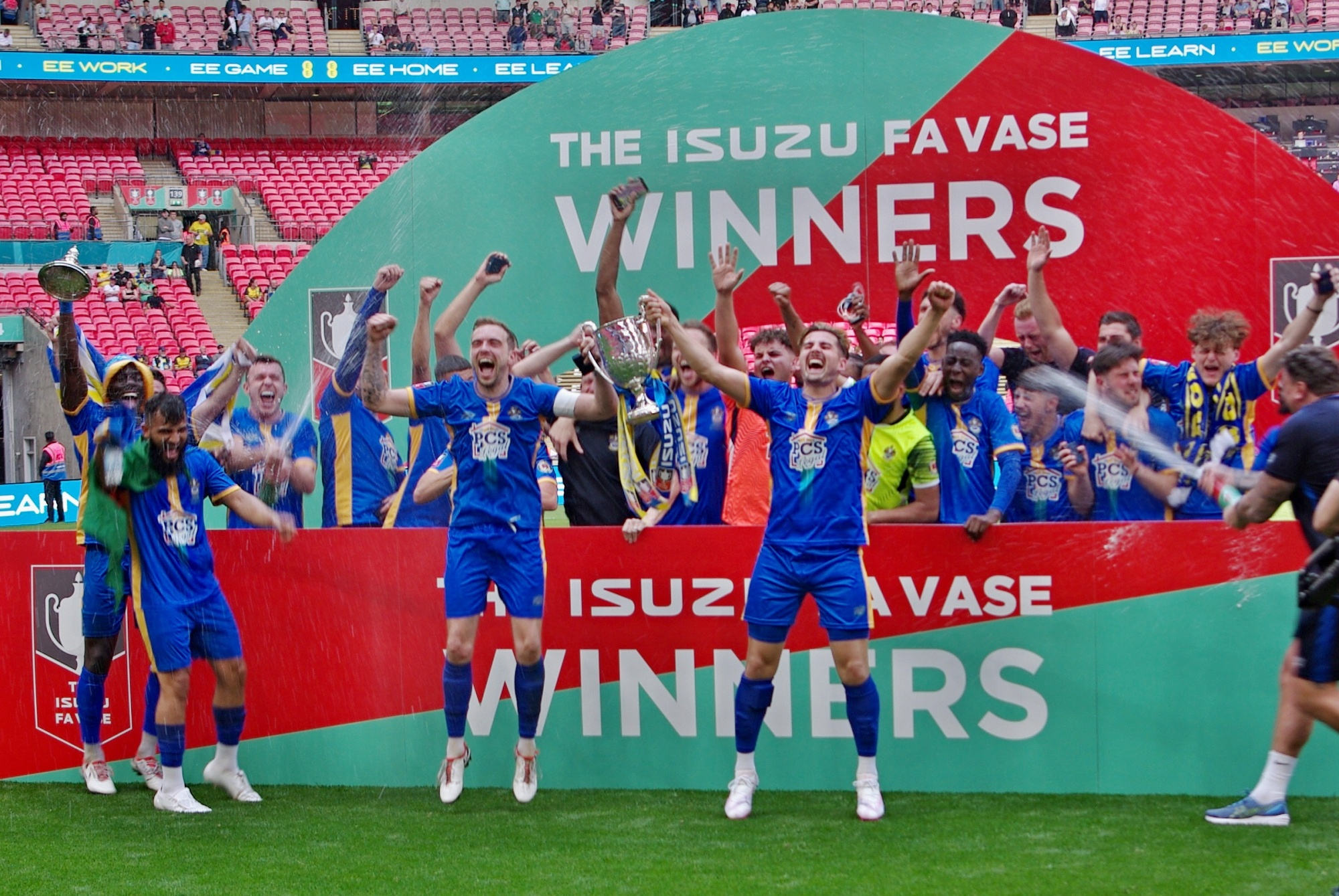
Romford win the FA Vase by defeating Great Wakering Rovers at Wembley Stadium on the 11 May 2024

At the start of the 2021–22 season the club announced joint managers Derek Duncan and Mark Holloway would take charge of team affairs, however they left the club in December 2021 after a disastrous run of results. Former boss Paul Martin took temporary charge, but results did not improve, and he left the club in March 2022 with Jon Fowell taking over until the end of the season. This saw the club have four managers during this season, over 100 players signed, using more than 70 players in all competitions and conceding a disastrous 154 goals in total in all competitive matches. Relegation to the Essex Senior League was confirmed on 26 March 2022, which was seen by many as inevitable.

Former Great Wakering Rovers boss Steve Butterworth was installed as manager in May 2022 and his tenure saw Boro reach the Third Qualifying Round of the FA Cup and the last sixteen of the FA Vase, both for the first time since the 1990s, but he left in March to take up a position at East Thurrock United. His assistant Dan Spinks took over and the last month of the season saw an excellent run of form which was an indicator of what was to come in 2023–24, which opened with five straight wins saw Romford miss out on promotion, losing the play-off final to Sporting Bengal. In the FA Vase, Romford made it all the way to the final at Wembley, beating Great Wakering Rovers 3-0 in the final.

In the 2024–25 season Romford finished 11th. The Boro had a decent start to the season going unbeaten for the first six games, after a 2-1 loss at home to Little Oakley Romford went on to win five games in a row. Over New Year The Boro had won a few games but then by the end of February everything started going downhill after a 4-1 loss away at Athletic Newham. Romford went on to lose 10 and draw 2 of the last 12 games, including a stunning 1-1 draw away at Stanway Rovers who went onto win the league. In the FA Cup Romford won after a replay against Eynesbury Rovers in the Extra Preliminary Round, then were drawn away to Brightlingsea Regent and lost 4-0. After winning the FA Vase last season, Romford lost away to Takeley in the second round. The Boro lost away in the Second Round to Little Oakley in the Essex Senior Cup, also lost to them in the Peter Butcher Memorial Trophy Quarter-Final on penalties. In the Errington Challenge Cup Romford lost 2-1 to Stanway Rovers.

At the end of the 2025–26 season Romford finished 14th, with a bit of a relegation battle on the final day with Sporting Bengal United, Athletic Newham and White Ensign. In the FA Cup Boro lost 1-0 away at Stanway Rovers in the Extra-Preliminary Round, in the FA Vase Boro lost 2-0 away at Ilford. It was announced on the 8 May 2026 that Steve Gardner would be stepping down from the Chairman role after 23 years and proposed Sean Desmond for the role.It was announced on the 6 May 2026 that Dan Brown would step down as Boro manager, and that Darren Manning would be the clubs new manager

== Reserve team ==
After being reformed in 1929, Romford entered a reserve team into Division One of the London League. During their time in the Athenian and Isthmian leagues the reserves played in the reserves sections of the leagues. When the club turned professional in 1959 they entered the reserves into the Eastern Counties League, where they spent four seasons before joining the Metropolitan League in 1963. They went on to play in the Eastern Professional Football League, which they won in 1967–68, and the Essex Senior League, where they had a single season in 1974–75.

The reformed club ran a side called Rom Valley Rangers in the Essex Business Houses League in 1992–93 but there was no reserve side after that until 1996, when a team was entered the Essex & Herts Border Combination, finishing runners-up in the Western Division in each of its first three seasons. Romford remained in that league until 2008.

In season 2009–10 Romford ran their own team in the Essex Olympian League Division 2 which they won.

In season 2012-13 the team finished second in the Essex Senior League Reserve Division West repeating the feat the following season.

At the club's Player Presentation Evening on 10 May it was announced that due to financial restraints, the Reserve and Under-18 side would not be run for the 2014–15 season.

On 8 September 2015 it was announced that the club had teamed up with Belgian 4th Division side SK Berlare with a view to working with them in the future.

For the 2023/24 season, a Reserve team was entered in the Essex Senior League Reserve Division.

The Reserve team was disbanded for the 2024/25 season.

== Stadium ==
The club has led a nomadic existence, playing at nineteen home grounds during its history although most of these have been emergency arrangements when their established home ground was unavailable for various reasons. When the club reformed in 1992 it began playing at the Hornchurch Stadium, before moving to Ford United's Rush Green ground in 1995. In April 1996 they moved to Collier Row's Sungate ground, and the clubs merged during the summer. The spell at Sungate was fraught with problems and there were frequent and protracted periods when Romford had to borrow other grounds to play home matches owing to problems with the facilities at Sungate. In December 2001 they left Sungate for good and played at several different stadiums in order to complete the season. They returned to Rush Green in 2002 (as Ford United had left to groundshare with Barkingside). They remained there until 2008, when they moved to Aveley's Mill Field ground.

In 2009 it was announced that the club had been given permission to build a new stadium on the Westlands Playing Fields on London Road, however building work has yet to commence as planning permission has had to be re-applied for as the original permission expired while awaiting government approval for the change of use.

Romford began sharing with Thurrock at Ship Lane in 2012 but were required to move to East Thurrock United's Rookery Hill in 2018 when Thurrock folded and the ground was closed. This arrangement was only in place for one year however, and it was arranged for Romford to move rather closer to home for the 2019–20 season and share with Brentwood Town. In 2020 Romford announced a ground share that would involve them playing their home games at Mayesbrook Park, home of Barking.

On 29 October 2023, Romford announced the club would be moving back to Rookery Hill the following month after East Thurrock folded at the beginning of October 2023. However the lease proved to be unsustainable and it was confirmed on 26 May 2024 that the Club would move back to Mayesbrook Park to groundshare with Barking, for at least two years beginning with the 2024–25 season.

On 10 December 2025 it was announced that Romford had agreed a deal with Barking to extend the stay for another 2 seasons beginning in the 2026-27 season.

== Players and staff ==
=== 2026-27 current squad ===
Player	Apps	Goals	Notes
Goalkeepers
Conor Beattie	3	0	---
Dino Maras	0	0	---
George Sapsford	0	0	---
Lamar Johnson	0	0	Joined from Welwyn Garden City
Defenders
Alfie Leach	2	1	---
Ben Sargent	3	0	Joined from White Ensign
Chris John	1	0	Joined from Walthamstow
Freddy Tandon	3	0	---
Julius Nwike	3	0	---
Teddy Desmond	3	0	---
Midfielders
Alfie Osbourne	3	0	Joined from Basildon United
Aron Gordon	3	0	Joined from Grays Athletic
Ben McCrow	3	0	Joined from Heybridge Swifts
Ekow Owusu-Boakye	3	0	Joined from Camberley Town
Flynn Hamilton	1	0	2025-26 Top Scorer
Greig Stewart	3	0	---
Jake Barlow	0	0	---
Prince Sikiru	1	0	Joined from Redbridge
Forwards
Elton Gjonbala	1	0	Joined from Sporting Bengal United
Jaxon Brown	3	2	---
Matthew Price	0	0	---

*will be updated once the 2026-27 season squad has been fully announced.

=== Current staff ===
Position	Name
Manager	Vacant
Assistant Manager	James Falaise
1st Team Coaches	Gary Beechey
1st Team Coaches	Warren Clarke
Physiotherapist	Chris Le-Vien

== List of managers ==
Dates	Name	First Competitive Game	Last Competitive Game	Notes
22/08/92 - 06/05/95	Lyndon Lynch	Romford 3-1 East Ham United	Maldon Town 1-2 Romford	Managed Romford FC's First Game
19/08/95 - 03/05/97	Don McGovern/Alan Marson	Romford 2-0 Bowers United	Romford 3-0 Hungerford Town	Essex Senior League Champions 95-96, Essex Senior League Cup Winners 95-96
16/08/97 - 15/05/98	Les Whitton	Molesey 1-1 Romford	Romford 3-2 Aveley	East Anglian Cup Champions 97-98
22/08/98 - 30/01/99	Steve Wheeler	Wealdstone 1-0 Romford	Romford 3-1 Whyteleafe	---
02/02/99 - 17/10/99	Amin Levitt	Hitchin Town 3-1 Romford	Romford 2-4 Braintree Town	---
21/10/00 - 11/11/00	John Bennett	Wealdstone 3-3 Romford	Northwood 2-0 Romford	---
18/11/00 - 29/11/00	Bob Clarkson (caretaker)	Romford 2-4 Thame United	Witham Town 0-1 Romford	---
27/01/01 - 27/08/01	Paul Withey	Leatherhead 4-1 Romford	Tilbury 2-0 Romford	Relegated to Isthmian League Division Two 00/01
01/09/01 - 26/04/03	Paul Joynes	Romford 1-2 Southend Manor	Southend Manor 1-1 Romford	---
16/08/03 - 15/01/08	Mark Reed	Waltham Abbey 2-1 Romford	Romford 1-4 Eton Manor	Resigned from Isthmian League 02/03, Gordon Brasted Trophy Winners 03/04
24/01/08 - 09/11/19	Paul Martin	London APSA 0-4 Romford	Heybridge Swifts 5-1 Romford	Essex Senior League Champions 08/09, longest serving Romford Manager
26/12/11	Keith Preston	Grays Athletic 1-2 Romford		Stepped in as Paul Martin suspended. Only Romford manager with 100% record
16/11/19 - 31/10/20	Glenn Tamplin	Romford 2-3 Coggeshall Town	Bury Town 2-2 Romford	---
07/08/21 - 18/12/21	Derek Duncan/Mark Holloway	Harpenden Town 1-1 Romford	Romford 0-4 Coggeshall Town	---
27/12/21 - 05/03/22	Paul Martin (interim)	Barking 3-1 Romford	Romford 0-8 Bury Town	---
12/03/22 - 23/04/22	Jon Fowell (interim)	Romford 0-5 Great Wakering	Romford 2-3 Witham Town	Relegated to Essex Senior League 21/22
30/07/22 - 01/03/23	Steve Butterworth	Buckhurst Hill 1-2 Romford	Romford 0-2 Enfield Town	---
04/03/23 - 11/05/24	Dan Spinks	White Ensign 1-0 Romford	Great Wakering 0-3 Romford	FA Vase Winners 23/24
27/07/24 - 01/11/25	Kris Newby	Romford 4-1 Stanway Rovers	Barking 1-3 Romford	---
02/11/25 - 06/05/26	Dan Browne (interim)	Ilford 2-0 Romford	Romford 2-1 Harwich & Parkeston	---
20/05/26 - 02/11/26	Darren Manning	Basildon United vs Romford		

*will be updated once the next game is played.

== Club honours ==
Trophy	Years won
FA Vase	2023–24
Southern Football League Premier Division	1966–67
Isthmian League Division Two	1996–97
Athenian League	1935-36, 1936–37
Essex Senior Football League	1995–96, 2008–09
Essex Senior League Cup	1995–96
Gordon Brasted Memorial Trophy	2003-04
Eastern Floodlight League	1967-68
Essex Senior Cup	1911-12, 1931–32, 1933–34, 1937–38, 1946–47
East Anglian Cup	1997-98

== Season by season overview ==
Season	League	Position	FA Cup	FA Trophy/Vase	Others Trophies Won	Top Appearance Maker	Top Scorer
1992-93	Essex Senior League	9th	---	---	---	Roy Drake - 36	Steve Brock - 9
1993-94	Essex Senior League	4th	---	FAV - Extra Preliminary Round	---	Roy Drake - 42	Shaun Adams - 17
1994-95	Essex Senior League	3rd	3rd Qualifying Round	FAV - Round 1	---	Roy Drake - 48	Micky Ross - 26
1995-96	Essex Senior League	1st (promoted)	3rd Qualifying Round	FAV - Round 1	Essex Senior League Cup	Paul Evans - 46	Danny Benstock - 20
1996-97	Isthmian League Division Two	1st (promoted)	1st Qualifying Round	FAV - Round 5	---	Danny Benstock - 64	Martin Hayes - 29
1997-98	Isthmian League Division One	7th	4th Qualifying Round	FAT - 3rd Qualifying Round	East Anglian Cup	Stuart Horne - 61	Vinny John - 45
1998-99	Isthmian League Division One	10th	2nd Qualifying Round	FAT - 2nd Qualifying Round	---	Kevin Marsden - 50	Trevor Paul - 23
1999-00	Isthmian League Division One	19th	4th Qualifying Round	FAT - Round 1	---	Tony Kinnear - 55	Chris Rose - 15
2000-01	Isthmian League Division One	21st (relegated)	Preliminary Round	FAT - Round 1	---	Steve Good - 44	Mervin Abraham - 13
2001-02	Isthmian League Division Two	22nd(relegated)	Preliminary Round	FAV - Round 2	---	Duncan Grover - 50	Wayne Mahoney - 6
2002-03	Essex Senior League	5th	1st Qualifying Round	FAV - 1st Qualifying Round	---	Steve King - 45	Kenny Leslie - 24
2003-04	Essex Senior League	5th	Extra-Preliminary Round	FAV - 2nd Qualifying Round	Gordon Brasted Memorial Trophy	Ross Biscoe - 41	Jason Friend - 29
2004-05	Essex Senior League	5th	Extra-Preliminary Round	FAV - Round 1	---	Steve King - 44	Jordan Tolan - 19
2005-06	Essex Senior League	12th	Extra-Preliminary Round	FAV - Round 2	---	Des Gallen - 45	Des Gallen - 16
2006-07	Essex Senior League	2nd	2nd Qualifying Round	FAV - Round 2	---	Paul Clayton - 54	Des Gallen - 25
2007-08	Essex Senior League	5th	Extra-Preliminary Round	FAV - Round 3	---	Danny Rafis - 48	Bradley Jones - 20
2008-09	Essex Senior League	1st (promoted)	Preliminary Round	FAV - Round 2	---	Ben Turner/Paul Clayton - 42	Paul Kavanagh - 17
2009-10	Isthmian League North Division	13th	1st Qualifying Round	FAT - Preliminary Round	---	Paul Kavanagh - 43	Kurt Smith - 16
2010-11	Isthmian League North Division	12th	2nd Qualifying Round	FAT - 3rd Qualifying Round	---	Paul Clayton - 48	Alex Read - 14
2011-12	Isthmian League North Division	13th	1st Qualifying Round	FAT - Preliminary Round	---	Jack Barry - 41	Kurt Smith - 20
2012-13	Isthmian League North Division	8th	Preliminary Round	FAT - 1st Qualifying Round	---	Paul Clayton - 41	Nick Reynolds - 16
2013-14	Isthmian League North Division	11th	1st Qualifying Round	FAT - Preliminary Round	---	Paul Clayton - 44	Tom Richardson - 16
2014-15	Isthmian League North Division	20th	2nd Qualifying Round	FAT - Preliminary Round	---	Aaron Omand - 52	Nick Reynolds - 13
2015-16	Isthmian League North Division	16th	Preliminary Round	FAT - 1st Qualifying Round	---	Ryan Boswell - 47	Nick Reynolds - 9
2016-17	Isthmian League North Division	16th	1st Qualifying Round	FAT - 2nd Qualifying Round	---	Ryan Boswell - 54	Chinedu McKenzie - 29
2017-18	Isthmian League North Division	23rd	1st Qualifying Round	FAT - Preliminary Round	---	Jonathan Nzengo - 54	Jonathan Nzengo - 9
2018-19	Isthmian League North Division	19th	1st Qualifying Round	FAT - Extra Preliminary Round	---	Danny Cossington - 38	Ayo Olukoga - 6
2019-20	Isthmian League North Division	N/A	1st Qualifying Round	FAT - Preliminary Round	---	Malakai Toussaint - 32	Adam Morgan - 8
2020-21	Isthmian League North Division	N/A	Extra Preliminary Round	FAT - 2nd Qualifying Round	---	Lee Newton - 10	Lee Newton - 2
2021-22	Isthmian League North Division	20th (relegated)	1st Qualifying Round	FAT - 2nd Qualifying Round	---	Sam Dickens - 32	L'Heureux Menga - 7
2022-23	Essex Senior League	14th	3rd Qualifying Round	FAV - Round 4	---	George Cox - 46	Charlie Morris - 22
2023-24	Essex Senior League	3rd	Preliminary Round	FAV - Winners	---	Hassan Nalbant - 51	Hassan Nalbant - 32
2024-25	Essex Senior League	11th	Preliminary Round	FAV - Round 2	---	Toheeb Elegushi - 37	Kennedy Feyi - 9
2025-26	Essex Senior League	14th	Extra-Preliminary Round	FAV - 1st Qualifying Round	---	Harry Elsey - 39	Flynn Hamilton - 11
2026-27	Essex Senior League						

2019-20, 2020-21 season void

== Statistics ==
=== Goals and appearances ===
No.	Player	Goals scorerd	No.	Player	Appearances
1.	Nick Reynolds	79	1.	Paul Clayton	396
2.	Danny Benstock	67	2.	Nick Reynolds	327
3.	Kurt Smith	57	3.	James Ishamil	255
4.	Micky Ross	57	4.	Danny Benstock	253
5.	Martin Hayes	57	5.	Steven Horne	246
6.	Des Gallen	50	6.	Jack Barry	228
7.	Steve King	48	7.	Micky Rogan	221
8.	Paul Clayton	48	8.	Jamie Dicks	212
9.	Kevin Clark	45	9.	Paul Kavanagh	201
10.	Vinny John	45	10.	Neil Finn	199

=== Player of the season ===
Season	Player	Season	Player	Season	Player	Season	Player
1992-93	Lee Faulkner	2003-04	Jason Friend	2014-15	Aaron Omand	2025-26	Greig Stewart
1993-94	Roy Drake	2004-05	Steve King	2015-16	Micheal Gooch		
1994-95	Micky Ross	2005-06	Neil Finn	2016-17	Callum Chafer		
1995-96	Danny Benstock	2006-07	Petrit Elbi	2017-18	Danny Cossington		
1996-97	Paul Evans	2007-08	Ricki Mackin	2018-19	Danny Cossington		
1997-98	Mark Reed	2008-09	Ricki Mackin	2019-20	Not Awarded		
1998-99	Kevin Marsden	2009-10	Paul Kavanagh	2020-21	Not Awarded		
1999-00	Jason White	2010-11	Adam Rafis	2021-22	Not Awarded		
2000-01	Steve Good	2011-12	Kurt Smith	2022-23	Jake Anderson		
2001-02	Wayne Mahoney	2012-13	Paul Clayton	2023-24	Scott Doe		
2002-03	Steve King	2013-14	Abs Seymour	2024-25	Qamil Dervishaj		

== Cup runs ==
- Best FA Cup performance: Quarter Final vs Darwen, 1880-81
- Best FA Trophy performance: 2nd round replay, 1998–99
- Best FA Vase performance: Champions, 2023–24
- Best FA Amateur Cup performance: Runners-up, 1948–49
- Best Essex Senior Cup performance: Winners, 1911/12, 1931/32, 1933/34, 1937/38, 1946/47

== Club records (since 1876) ==
- Attendance: 17 081 vs Southall, FA Amateur Cup 4th Round (replay), 28 February 1953
- Biggest victory: 12-1 vs Stork (Purfleet), FA Cup 17 September 1938
- Biggest defeat: 0–15 vs Darwen, FA Cup, 5 March 1885

== Club records (since 1992) ==
- Highest Attendance: 820 vs Leatherhead, Isthmian League Division Two, 15 April 1997
- Lowest Attendance: 41 vs London APSA, Essex Senior League Cup, 2 October 2007
- Highest Neutral Attendance: 19,964 vs Great Wakering Rovers, FA Vase final, Wembley Stadium, 11 May 2024
- Biggest Victory: 9-0 vs Hullbridge Sports, Essex Senior League, 21 October 1995
- Biggest Defeat: 0-13 vs Canvey Island, Isthmian League North Division, 9 April 2022

== Player records (since 1992) ==
- Most appearances: Paul Clayton, 396, 2006–2015
- Most goals: Nick Reynolds, 79, 2010–2019, 2025-Now
- Fastest goal: Danny Benstock 11 seconds vs Great Wakering Rovers, Essex Senior League, 28 August 1995
- Most goals in one season: Vinny John 45 (3 pens), 1997/98
- Most consecutive appearances: Ryan Boswell 67, 19 December 2015 – 18 February 2017
- Youngest player: Perry Burns (15 yrs 266 days, 29 April 2006)
- Oldest player: Mark Lord (48 yrs 90 days, 3 March 2015)
- Youngest goalscorer: Praise Ogbebor (16yrs 7m, 10 February 2023)
- Oldest goalscorer: John Maskell (39 yrs 5 months, 23 March 2019)
