= Essex County Football Association =

Area sporting organization with 19th century origins

- Essex FA logo
- Formation: 30 September 1882
- Purpose: Football association
- Headquarters: Springfield
- Location: Chelmsford, Essex
- Coordinates: 51.749029°N 0.512444°E
- Chief Executive: Phil Sammons
- Website: http://www.essexfa.com/

The Essex County Football Association, also simply known as the Essex FA, is the governing body of football in the county of Essex.
