= Concord Rangers F.C. =

Association football club in Canvey Island, England

Coordinates: 51°30′45″N 0°34′32″E

Concord Rangers
- Full name: Concord Rangers Football Club
- Nickname: The Beach Boys
- Founded: 1967; 59 years ago
- Ground: Thames Road, Canvey Island
- Capacity: 3,300
- Chairman: Declan Hogan
- Manager: Ricky Modeste
- League: Isthmian League North Division
- 2025–26: Isthmian League North Division, 13th of 22
Home colours	Away colours

Concord Rangers Football Club is a semi-professional football club based in Canvey Island in Essex, England. The club currently compete in the Isthmian League North Division, the eighth tier of English football, and play their home matches at Thames Road.

== History ==
Concord Rangers was officially formed in 1967 by Albert Lant, and originated from a team of boys (including Albert's son Steve) that played friendly matches during 1966 on a pitch along the Canvey Island seafront close to the Concord Beach, hence the name Concord Rangers. They are therefore quite possibly the only English football team to be specifically named after a beach. The club initially joined the Thundermite Boys' Football League in 1967, with Albert Lant as manager, before progressing into the Vange and District League in 1973, where the club won several league and cup honours in a six-year period before joining the Mid-Essex League for the 1979–80 season – the club's first foray into Saturday football. At that time fixtures were played at Waterside Farm, on Canvey Island. The 1978–79 season saw Concord Rangers become the inaugural winners of the Essex Sunday Junior Trophy, defeating Bishop's Park 4–0 in a game played at Tiptree United. It was not until 1985 that the club secured land in Thames Road, to initially develop the clubhouse and stadium.

In 1988, the club joined the Essex Intermediate League Division Two, where they stayed for three seasons, winning the title in 1990–91 on goal difference and gaining promotion to the Essex Senior League. Concord spent 17 seasons in the Senior League, winning the title three times in that period (1997–98, 2003–04, 2007–08), Antony Smith took over the reins in 1999 and his most important decision in the coming years was appointing Danny Cowley as Manager. Much success was achieved with the 2007–08 championship win under the joint-management team of Danny Cowley and Danny Scopes seeing the club gaining promotion to the Isthmian League. The 2007–08 Essex Senior League winning season was the club's 40th anniversary year, and also saw the team win the Gordon Brasted Memorial Trophy, reach the final of the Essex Senior League Cup, and also reach the quarter finals of the FA Vase, in which they lost 1–0 to Lowestoft Town.

The "Beach Boys" reached the play-off final in their first season (2008–09) in the Isthmian League Division One North, but lost 5–4 on penalties to Waltham Abbey. Despite being touted as having hugely over-performed in their debut season at this level, the team once again reached the play-off final in the 2009–10 season, this time emerging as winners, defeating Enfield Town 3–1 in front of a crowd of 752 at Thames Road, to gain promotion to the Isthmian League Premier Division.

Concord had an impressive start to life at Premier Division level, finishing in eighth place in 2010–11, but this was followed by a lower 14th-place position for 2011–12, before a resurgent 2012–13 campaign saw the team reach the Premier Division play-offs, where they beat Wealdstone 2–1 away from home in the semi-finals, followed by a 2–1 away win at Lowestoft Town in front of a crowd of 2,490, to see the Beach Boys earn promotion to the Conference South for the first time in their history. The Beach Boys were also winners of the Isthmian League Cup for 2012–13, with a 3–2 victory after extra time over Dulwich Hamlet at Maidstone United's Gallagher Stadium.

2013–14 saw Concord have a successful inaugural season at Conference South level, finishing in ninth position, and also winning their first ever Essex Senior Cup, defeating higher-ranked opposition Braintree Town 2–1 at Dagenham & Redbridge's Victoria Road ground.

2014–15 was also another successful season for The Beach Boys, and included many firsts for the club. The club reached the first round proper of the FA Cup for the first time in their history, eventually losing 1–0 at home to League Two side Mansfield Town in a replay, after Jordan Chiedozie's goal had seen the sides draw 1–1 in the initial tie. In the league, the team improved on the previous season's ninth-place finish by securing seventh place, and also retained the Essex Senior Cup with a 5–0 victory over Billericay Town in the final, again played at Dagenham & Redbridge, and by doing so became the first team in 15 years to win consecutive Essex Senior Cups.

In May 2015 the team updated its crest to reflect the local heritage on Canvey Island, with the new crest designed by Impact Media who were local to Canvey at the time. The badge features stylised breaking waves representing Concord Beach and the local sea wall meeting the Thames Estuary, anchored by the club's traditional blue and yellow colours.

At the end of the 2014–15 season, long-serving manager Danny Cowley departed the club to become first team manager at National League side Braintree Town, having won three promotions and three cups since his appointment in 2007–08; in the process becoming the most successful manager in the club's history. His younger brother, and assistant manager Nicky Cowley also moved to Braintree to take up the post of assistant manager, having made 268 appearances for the club as a player, the majority as club captain, before making the switch to a coaching role in late 2014.

Adam Flanagan, a former Concord player – was appointed ahead of the 2015–16 season to succeed Danny Cowley, joining the Beach Boys from Brentwood Town whom he had just guided to promotion from the Isthmian League Division One North via the play-offs, with an impressive 5–0 win over Thurrock in the play-off final.

In 2015–16, Concord retained the Essex Senior Cup during Flanagan's first season in charge beating Heybridge Swifts 1–0 in the final at Dagenham and Redbridge's Victoria Road ground, and in doing so became the first team to win the cup three years in succession for 50 years. This Essex Senior Cup win meant Flanagan joined only a small group of people who have lifted the trophy as both a player and manager; having also won the competition with Billericay Town in the 2010–11 season.

It was announced on 26 April 2018 that Adam Flanagan would leave his post as first team manager after 3 seasons in the role, with assistant manager & first team coach Glen Alzapiedi also departing following a 17th-placed finish that secured a 4th consecutive season of National League South football for 'The Beachboys'. Under Flanagan's reign, the side finished 10th, 18th, and 17th in the National League South, and reached the FA Cup 4th qualifying round in 2017–18, eventually bowing out to higher-division opposition Woking in a replay.

On 2 May 2018, the club confirmed the appointment of former Leatherhead player/manager Sammy Moore as the successor to Adam Flanagan, with Jack Midson – a former teammate of Moore's at AFC Wimbledon and also his player/assistant at Leatherhead as assistant manager, with Darren Beale also joining as first team coach. It was then announced on 18 May 2018 that Miki Hood, who had been part of the club's staff under both Danny Cowley and Adam Flanagan would take on the role of assistant first team coach to complete the club's new-look management team.

The club reached the final of the 2019–20 FA Trophy, losing 0–1 to Harrogate Town in a final played in May 2021 due to the COVID-19 pandemic. On 10 May 2021, following the final defeat, Antony Smith stepped down from his role as chairman after twenty one years in the role. A day later, manager Danny Scopes also resigned from his position, with Lee Minshull resigning from his position of assistant manager on 14 May 2021.

The club's nine-year spell in the sixth tier came to an end in the 2022–23 season, suffering relegation back to the Isthmian League. The following season saw the club suffer back-to-back relegations.

== Managers ==
The following table lists Concord Rangers F.C.'s recent first‑team managers and their principal honours while in charge of the club.

Manager	Appointed	Left	Honours	Ref.
Danny Cowley	1 July 2008	30 April 2015	Essex Senior League: 2007–08; Isthmian League Division One North promotion: 2009–10; National League South promotion: 2013–14	
Sammy Moore	2 May 2018	30 April 2019	—	
Danny Scopes	3 May 2019	11 May 2021	FA Trophy runner-up: 2020–21	

== Ground ==
Concord Rangers moved into their Thames Road ground in 1988, installing floodlights four years later. In 1997, the club purchased 166 seats from Cardiff Arms Park to install at Thames Road, with the club later building a terrace behind the north end of the ground a year later.

== Coaching staff ==
Role	Nationality	Name
Manager		Ricky Modeste
Assistant manager		Liam Wilson
First-team coach		Scott Keys
Head Sports Therapist		Ross Newcombe

== Players ==
=== First team squad ===
As of 10th May 2026

Note: Flags indicate national team as defined under FIFA eligibility rules; some limited exceptions apply. Players may hold more than one non-FIFA nationality.

No.	Pos.	Nation	Player
—	GK		Charlie Brown
—	DF		Tambeson Eyong
—	DF		Hassan Togba
—	DF		Teddy Perkins
—	DF		Callum Knowlden
—	DF		Mack Polyblank
—	MF		Charlie Wardle
—	MF		Demi Elegushi
—	MF		Conor Hart
—	MF		Sam Brogan
—	FW		Toheeb Elegushi
—	FW		Kris Oti
—	FW		Kai Torres
—	FW		Reggie Gregory

=== Out on loan ===
Note: Flags indicate national team as defined under FIFA eligibility rules; some limited exceptions apply. Players may hold more than one non-FIFA nationality.

No.	Pos.	Nation	Player

== Honours ==
=== League ===
- Isthmian League Premier (Tier 7)
  - Play-off Winners: 2012–13
- Isthmian League Division One North (Tier 8)
  - Play-off Winners: 2009–10
- Essex Senior League
  - Winners (3): 1997–98, 2003–04, 2007–08
- Essex Intermediate League
  - Winners: 1990–91

=== Cups ===
- Isthmian League Cup
  - Winners: 2012–13
- Essex Senior Cup
  - Winners (3): 2013–14, 2014–15, 2015–16

== Records ==
- FA Cup
  - First Round 2014–15, 2020–21
- FA Trophy
  - Runners-up 2019–20
- FA Vase
  - Quarter Finals 2007–08
- Record attendance: 1,537 vs Mansfield Town, FA Cup first round replay, 25 November 2014
