= 2013–14 FA Cup =

The Football Association Challenge Cup
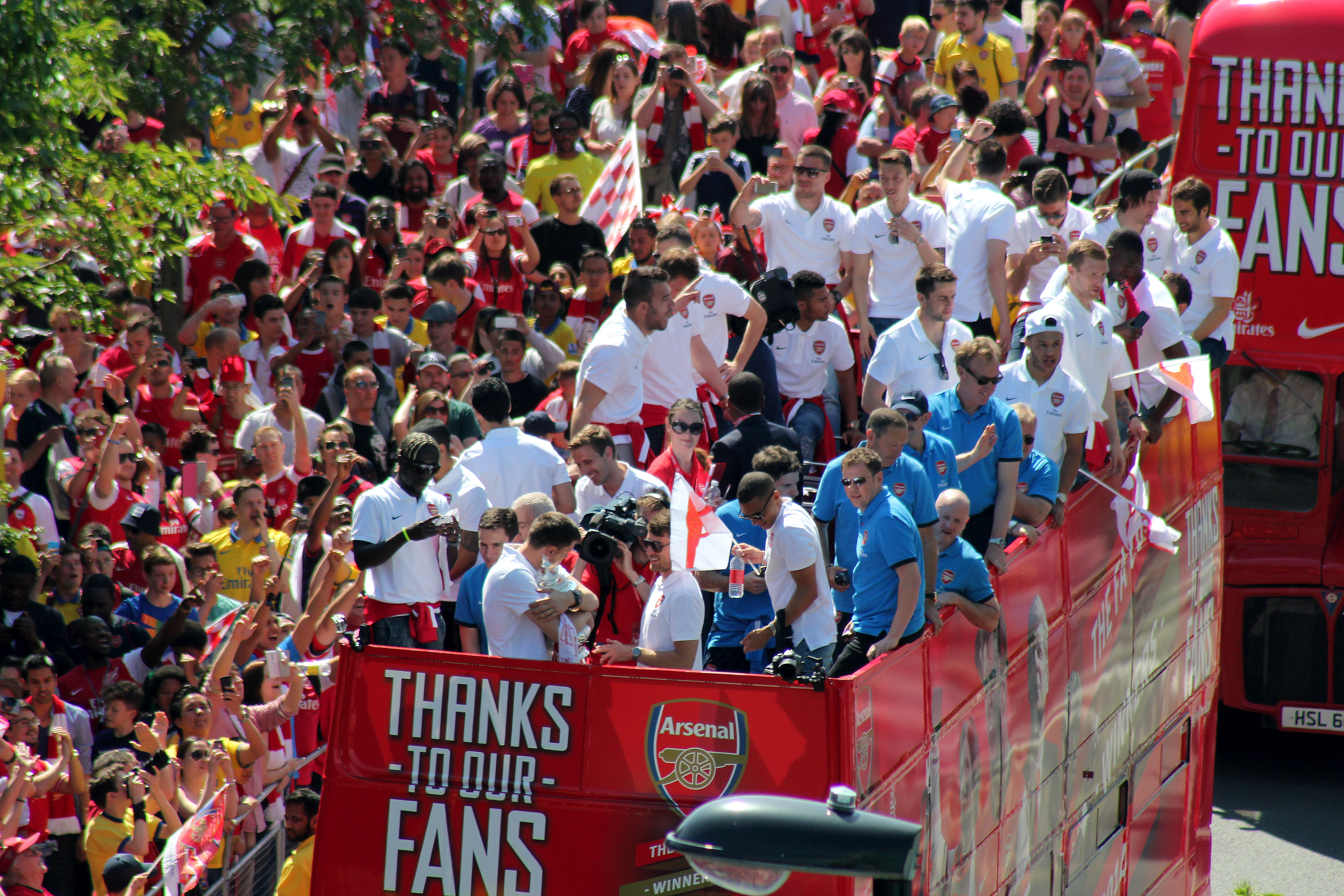
- Arsenal's victory parade following their 11th title

Tournament details
- Country: England; Guernsey; Wales
- Dates: 17 August 2013 – 17 May 2014
- Teams: 737

Final positions
- Champions: Arsenal (11th title)
- Runners-up: Hull City

Tournament statistics
- Matches played: 150
- Attendance: 1,887,923 (12,586 per match)
- Top goal scorer(s): Britt Assombalonga; Sam Clucas; Joe Garner (5 goals each)

The 2013–14 FA Cup (also known as the FA Cup with Budweiser for sponsorship reasons) was the 133rd season of the FA Cup, the main domestic cup competition in English football, and the oldest football knock-out competition in the world. It was sponsored by Budweiser for a third consecutive season. 737 clubs from England and Wales entered the competition, which began with the extra preliminary round on 16 August. For the first time in the history of the FA Cup, a team from Guernsey entered the competition, Guernsey F.C., who made it to the second round qualifying.

Football League Championship side Wigan Athletic were the defending champions, but they were eliminated by eventual winners Arsenal in the semi-finals. Wigan had won the previous season's FA Cup competition while still in the Premier League, beating Manchester City 1–0 in the 2013 final; they were relegated just days after the final.

The final was played on 17 May 2014 at Wembley Stadium, and saw Arsenal face Hull City. Arsenal were 2–0 down within the first 8 minutes; however, they were able to equalise through a free kick dispatched by Santi Cazorla and another goal by Laurent Koscielny, taking the match into extra time. Aaron Ramsey scored the winner for Arsenal in the 109th minute to give the club their 11th FA Cup, a tied record together with Manchester United.

As the winners of the FA Cup, Arsenal were entitled to play in the 2014–15 UEFA Europa League group stage. However, Arsenal had already qualified for the 2014–15 UEFA Champions League after finishing fourth in the 2013–14 Premier League so Hull City took the Europa League place as the FA Cup runners-up. Since Hull City did not win the Cup, they did not qualify for the group stage (as the Cup winners would do). Instead they qualified for the third qualifying round and the other English teams already qualified for Europa League, Everton and Tottenham Hotspur, moved up one round to the Europa League group stage and play-off round respectively.

== Teams ==
Round	Clubs remaining	Clubs involved	Winners from previous round	New entries this round	Leagues entering at this round
First round proper	124	80	32	48	EFL League One; EFL League Two
Second round proper	84	40	40	none	none
Third round proper	64	64	20	44	Premier League; EFL Championship
Fourth round proper	32	32	32	none	none
Fifth round proper	16	16	16	none	none
Quarter-finals	8	8	8	none	none
Semi-finals	4	4	4	none	none
Final	2	2	2	none	none

== Prize fund ==
Round	No. of clubs receive fund	Prize fund per club
Extra preliminary round	185	£1,500
Preliminary round	160	£1,925
First round qualifying	116	£3,000
Second round qualifying	80	£4,500
Third round qualifying	40	£7,500
Fourth round qualifying	32	£12,500
First round	40	£18,000
Second round	20	£27,000
Third round	32	£67,500
Fourth round	16	£90,000
Fifth round	8	£180,000
Sixth round	4	£360,000
Semi-final losers	2	£450,000
Semi-final winners	2	£900,000
Final runners-up	1	£900,000
Final winner	1	£1,800,000
Total		£15,133,500

== Qualifying rounds ==
All teams that entered the competition, but were not members of the Premier League or The Football League, competed in the qualifying rounds to secure one of 32 places available in the first round proper.

The winners from the fourth qualifying round were Macclesfield Town, Hednesford Town, Grimsby Town, Lincoln City, Kidderminster Harriers, Wrexham, Southport, Corby Town, Tamworth, Stourbridge, FC Halifax Town, Alfreton Town, Brackley Town, Gateshead, Sutton United, Barnet, Hereford United, Dartford, St Albans City, Boreham Wood, Dover Athletic, Gloucester City, Salisbury City, Bishop's Stortford, Cambridge United, Shortwood United, Braintree Town, Luton Town, Welling United, Biggleswade Town, Daventry Town and Staines Town.

Shortwood United, Biggleswade Town and Daventry Town were appearing in the competition proper for the first time. This was also the first season in which Shortwood United progressed further in the FA Cup than their higher-ranked crosstown rivals Forest Green Rovers. Of the other qualifying clubs, Hednesford Town and Welling United had last featured in the first round in 2005–06 and St Albans City had last done so in 2002–03.

== First round proper ==
The first round draw took place on Sunday 27 October at 1.35pm. A total of 80 teams competed, 32 of them having progressed from the Fourth Qualifying Round and 48 clubs from the Football League. The 48 Football League clubs that entered the first round proper comprised Football League One and Football League Two. The lowest-ranked sides in this round were Daventry Town and Shortwood United; they were the only level 8 teams left in the competition.

1 November 2013	Wimbledon (4)	1–3	Coventry City (3)	Cherry Red Records Stadium, Norbiton
20:00	Smith 54'	Report	Wilson 57'; Baker 60'; Kennedy 70' (o.g.)	Attendance: 3,379; Referee: Darren Drysdale

1 November 2013	Bristol Rovers (4)	3–3	York City (4)	Memorial Stadium, Bristol
19:45	Richards 37'; Harrold 59'; Beardsley 75'	Report	Jarvis 35'; Carson 41'; Fletcher 86'	Attendance: 4,654; Referee: Trevor Kettle

12 November 2013 Replay	York City (4)	2–3	Bristol Rovers (4)	Bootham Crescent, York
19:45	Fletcher 70' (pen.), 71'	Report	O'Toole 16'; Norburn 45'; Beardsley 50'	Attendance: 2,051; Referee: Andy Haines

2 November 2013	Grimsby Town (5)	0–0	Scunthorpe United (4)	Blundell Park, Cleethorpes
13:00		Report		Attendance: 8,306; Referee: David Coote

12 November 2013 Replay	Scunthorpe United (4)	1–2	Grimsby Town (5)	Glanford Park, Scunthorpe
19:45	Hawkridge 46'	Report	John-Lewis 10'; McDonald 57'	Attendance: 5,699; Referee: Stuart Attwell

2 November 2013	Boreham Wood (6)	0–0	Carlisle United (3)	Meadow Park, Borehamwood
14:00		Report		Attendance: 901; Referee: Brendan Malone

12 November 2013 Replay	Carlisle United (3)	2–1	Boreham Wood (6)	Brunton Park, Carlisle
19:45	Miller 80'; Beck 90+5'	Report	Garrard 29' (pen.)	Attendance: 1,484; Referee: Mark Haywood

2 November 2013	Morecambe (4)	0–3	Southend United (4)	Globe Arena, Morecambe
15:00		Report	Straker 7', 9'; Leonard 90+3'	Attendance: 1,475; Referee: Rob Lewis

2 November 2013	Walsall (3)	3–0	Shrewsbury Town (3)	Banks's Stadium, Walsall
15:00	Westcarr 29', 59'; Sawyers 73'	Report		Attendance: 3,338; Referee: Charles Breakspear

2 November 2013	St. Albans City (7)	1–8	Mansfield Town (4)	Clarence Park, St Albans
15:00	Locke 8'	Report	Stevenson 43'; Howell 45'; Daniel 70'; Clucas 74', 81', 86', 90'; Palmer 77'	Attendance: 3,251; Referee: Mark Heywood

2 November 2013	Milton Keynes Dons (3)	4–1	FC Halifax Town (5)	Stadium mk, Milton Keynes
15:00	McLeod 39', 70'; Williams 52' (pen.); Galloway 90+2'	Report	Gregory 78'	Attendance: 4,049; Referee: Darren Bond

2 November 2013	Tamworth (5)	1–0	Cheltenham Town (4)	The Lamb Ground, Tamworth
15:00	Chadwick 20'	Report		Attendance: 1,566; Referee: Richard Clark

12 November 2013	Bury (4)	0–0	Cambridge United (5)	Gigg Lane, Bury
19:45		Report		Attendance: 1,712; Referee: Mark Brown

26 November 2013 Replay	Cambridge United (5)	2–1	Bury (4)	Abbey Stadium, Cambridge
19:45	Berry 61', 87'	Report	Harrad 64'	Attendance: 3,342; Referee: Gary Sutton (referee)

2 November 2013	Corby Town (7)	1–2	Dover Athletic (6)	Steel Park, Corby
15:00	Carruthers 90+2'	Report	Elder 57'; Kinnear 65'	Attendance: 1,387; Referee: Amy Fearn

2 November 2013	Colchester United (3)	2–3	Sheffield United (3)	Weston Homes Community Stadium, Colchester
15:00	Bonne 48'; Garbutt 64'	Report	Maguire 10'; Walker 12' (o.g.); Porter 81' (pen.)	Attendance: 2,509; Referee: Phil Gibbs

9 November 2013	Oxford United (4)	2–2	Gateshead (5)	Kassam Stadium, Oxford
15:00	Smalley 77'; Rose 90'	Report	Marwood 12'; Chandler 51'	Attendance: 3,114; Referee: Jeremy Simpson

5 December 2013 Replay	Gateshead (5)	0–1 (a.e.t.)	Oxford United (4)	Gateshead International Stadium, Gateshead
19:45		Report	Smalley 116' (pen.)	Attendance: 2,632; Referee: Paul Tierney

2 November 2013	Hartlepool United (4)	3–2	Notts County (3)	Victoria Park, Hartlepool
15:00	Baldwin 16'; James 42', 75'	Report	Walton 18' (o.g.); Murray 84'	Attendance: 3,313; Referee: Carl Boyeson

2 November 2013	Wrexham (5)	3–1	Alfreton Town (5)	Racecourse Ground, Wrexham
15:00	Bishop 24', 49'; Harris 72'	Report	Speight 61' (pen.)	Attendance: 2,415; Referee: Darren England

2 November 2013	Chesterfield (4)	2–0	Daventry Town (8)	Proact Stadium, Chesterfield
15:00	Roberts 69'; Ryan 88'	Report		Attendance: 5,269; Referee: Darren Handley

2 November 2013	Bristol City (3)	3–0	Dagenham & Redbridge (4)	Ashton Gate, Bristol
15:00	Emmanuel-Thomas 35', 90+5'; Elliott 87'	Report		Attendance: 3,763; Referee: Andy Woolmer

2 November 2013	Preston North End (3)	6–0	Barnet (5)	Deepdale, Preston
15:00	Clarke 18'; Garner 36', 82'; Gallagher 45+1', 68', 79'	Report		Attendance: 5,217; Referee: Ross Joyce

2 November 2013	Rotherham United (3)	3–0	Bradford City (3)	New York Stadium, Rotherham
15:00	Agard 13', 71'; Revell 62'	Report		Attendance: 7,667; Referee: James Adcock

2 November 2013	Gillingham (3)	1–1	Brackley Town (6)	MEMS Priestfield Stadium, Gillingham
15:00	Dack 90+7'	Report	Martin 69' (o.g.)	Attendance: 3,004; Referee: Lee Collins

11 November 2013 Replay	Brackley Town (6)	1–0	Gillingham (3)	St James Park, Brackley
19:45	Walker 21'	Report		Attendance: 1,772; Referee: Lee Collins

2 November 2013	Salisbury City (5)	4–2	Dartford (5)	Raymond McEnhill Stadium, Salisbury
15:00	Fitchett 13', 77'; Wright 18'; Frear 45'	Report	Burns 68'; Cornhill 90+5'	Attendance: 1,279; Referee: Simon Bennett

2 November 2013	Accrington Stanley (4)	0–1	Tranmere Rovers (3)	Crown Ground, Accrington
15:00		Report	Lowe 90'	Attendance: 1,711; Referee: Seb Stockbridge

2 November 2013	Brentford (3)	5–0	Staines Town (6)	Griffin Park, Brentford
15:00	McCormack 21' (pen.); Reeves 35'; Harris 38'; Trotta 50'; Donaldson 90+2'	Report		Attendance: 5,263; Referee: Steve Rushton

2 November 2013	Stevenage (3)	2–1	Portsmouth (4)	Lamex Stadium, Stevenage
15:00	Zoko 9', 39'	Report	Connolly 71'	Attendance: 2,829; Referee: Gary Sutton

2 November 2013	Leyton Orient (3)	5–2	Southport (5)	Matchroom Stadium, Leyton
15:00	Batt 3', 56'; Mooney 9'; James 45+9'; Cox 67'	Report	George 21'; Flynn 87'	Attendance: 3,014; Referee: Kevin Johnson

2 November 2013	Peterborough United (3)	2–0	Exeter City (4)	London Road, Peterborough
15:00	Assombalonga 72'; Mendez-Laing 79'	Report		Attendance: 3,379; Referee: Graham Salisbury

2 November 2013	Torquay United (4)	0–2	Rochdale (4)	Plainmoor, Torquay
15:00		Report	Hogan 85'; Vincenti 89'	Attendance: 1,976; Referee: Keith Hill

2 November 2013	Braintree Town (5)	1–1	Newport County (4)	Amlin Stadium, Braintree
15:00	Isaac 9'	Report	Peters 50' (o.g.)	Attendance: 1,004; Referee: Graham Horwood

12 November 2013 Replay	Newport County (4)	1–0	Braintree Town (5)	Rodney Parade, Newport
19:45	Willmott 45+1'	Report		Attendance: 1,406; Referee: Andy Davies

2 November 2013	Oldham Athletic (3)	1–1	Wolverhampton Wanderers (3)	Boundary Park, Oldham
15:00	Kusunga 2'	Report	Golbourne 37'	Attendance: 3,916; Referee: Geoff Eltringham

2 November 2013 Replay	Wolverhampton Wanderers (3)	1–2	Oldham Athletic (3)	Molineux, Wolverhampton
19:45	Griffiths 90+5'	Report	Philliskirk 21'; Rooney 73'	Attendance: 4,226; Referee: Keith Stroud

2 November 2013	Lincoln City (5)	0–0	Plymouth Argyle (4)	Gelder Group Sincil Bank Stadium, Lincoln
15:00		Report		Attendance: 2,924; Referee: Scott Duncan

13 November 2013 Replay	Plymouth Argyle (4)	5–0	Lincoln City (5)	Home Park, Plymouth
19:45	Reid 4', 24' (pen.), 35'; Alessandra 5'; Boyce 65' (o.g.)	Report		Attendance: 3,324; Referee: Darren Deadman

2 November 2013	Kidderminster Harriers (5)	4–1	Sutton United (6)	Aggborough, Kidderminster
15:00	Morgan-Smith 13'; Gittings 18'; Lolley 60'; Malbon 90'	Report	Clough 10'	Attendance: 2,045; Referee: Justin Amey

2 November 2013	Hednesford Town (6)	1–2	Crawley Town (3)	Keys Park, Hednesford
15:00	Durrell 76' (pen.)	Report	Campion 61' (o.g.); Sinclair 83'	Attendance: 2,321; Referee: Michael Bull

2 November 2013	Stourbridge (7)	4–1	Biggleswade Town (7)	War Memorial Ground, Amblecote
15:00	Rowe 12', 17'; Richards 58'; Benbow 85'	Report	Key 14'	Attendance: 1,605; Referee: Lee Swabey

2 November 2013	Welling United (5)	2–1	Luton Town (5)	Park View Road, Welling
15:00	Clarke 28'; Healy 44'	Report	Benson 57'	Attendance: 1,555; Referee: Ben Toner

2 November 2013	Macclesfield Town (5)	4–0	Swindon Town (3)	Moss Rose, Macclesfield
15:00	Jennings 26', 74'; Boden 70'; Winn 89'	Report		Attendance: 1,835; Referee: Andy Madley

2 November 2013	Wycombe Wanderers (4)	1–1	Crewe Alexandra (3)	Adams Park, High Wycombe
15:00	Cowan-Hall 37'	Report	Grant 4'	Attendance: 1,929; Referee: David Phillips

12 November 2013 Replay	Crewe Alexandra (3)	0–2	Wycombe Wanderers (4)	Alexandra Stadium, Crewe
19:45		Report	Craig 50' (pen.); Doherty 70'	Attendance: 1,695; Referee: Kevin Wright

2 November 2013	Gloucester City (6)	0–2	Fleetwood Town (4)	Abbey Business Stadium, Cheltenham
15:00		Report	Ball 11'; Parkin 84'	Attendance: 1,183; Referee: Fred Graham

3 November 2013	Bishop's Stortford (6)	1–2	Northampton Town (4)	ProKit UK Stadium, Bishop's Stortford
14:00	Prestedge 81'	Report	Emerton 62'; Norris 68'	Attendance: 2,548; Referee: Stephen Martin

3 November 2013	Burton Albion (4)	2–0	Hereford United (5)	Pirelli Stadium, Burton upon Trent
15:00	McGurk 37'; Palmer 84'	Report		Attendance: 2,069; Referee: Chris Kavanagh

4 November 2013	Shortwood United (8)	0–4	Port Vale (3)	Meadowbank Ground, Nailsworth
19:45		Report	Myrie-Williams 14', 89' (pen.); Birchall 30'; Lines 90+2'	Attendance: 1,247; Referee: Dean Whitestone

== Second round Proper ==
The second round draw took place on Saturday 2 November at 11.00pm. A total of 40 teams competed, all having progressed from the first round proper. The lowest ranked side to qualify for this round was Stourbridge, the only level 7 team left in the competition.

29 November 2013	Port Vale (3)	4–1	Salisbury City (5)	Vale Park, Burslem
19:45	Robertson 25'; Pope 78'; Taylor 81'; Williamson 90+1'	Report	Fitchett 64'	Attendance: 4,658; Referee: Darren Sheldrake

30 November 2013	Wycombe Wanderers (4)	0–1	Preston North End (3)	Adams Park, High Wycombe
15:00		Report	Davies 34'	Attendance: 2,249; Referee: David Webb

30 November 2013	Bristol Rovers (4)	0–0	Crawley Town (3)	Memorial Stadium, Bristol
15:00		Report		Attendance: 4,623; Referee: Chris Sarginson

11 December 2013 Replay	Crawley Town (3)	0–0	Bristol Rovers (4)	The Checkatrade.com Stadium, Crawley
19:45				Attendance: 1,496; Referee: Stuart Attwell

21 December 2013 Replay	Crawley Town (3)	1–2	Bristol Rovers (4)	The Checkatrade.com Stadium, Crawley
15:00	Proctor 15'	Report	Richards 82'; O'Toole 89'	Attendance: 2,435; Referee: Stuart Attwell

30 November 2013	Milton Keynes Dons (3)	1–0	Dover Athletic (6)	Stadium mk, Milton Keynes
15:00	Reeves 51'	Report		Attendance: 4,060; Referee: Lee Collins

30 November 2013	Carlisle United (3)	3–2	Brentford (3)	Brunton Park, Carlisle
15:00	Berrett 45+1'; Miller 73', 77' (pen.)	Report	Chimbonda 63' (o.g.); El Alagui 86'	Attendance: 2,581; Referee: Andy Woolmer

30 November 2013	Macclesfield Town (5)	3–2	Brackley Town (6)	Moss Rose, Macclesfield
15:00	Andrew 17'; Boden 50'; Mackreth 81'	Report	Diggin 58'; Story 71'	Attendance: 2,438; Referee: Tony Harrington

30 November 2013	Chesterfield (4)	1–3	Southend United (4)	Proact Stadium, Chesterfield
15:00	Darikwa 4'	Report	Laird 12'; Straker 17'; Hurst 85'	Attendance: 4,067; Referee: Mick Russell

30 November 2013	Oldham Athletic (3)	1–1	Mansfield Town (4)	Boundary Park, Oldham
15:00	Smith 28'	Report	Clucas 45+1'	Attendance: 3,429; Referee: Ian Williamson

10 December 2013 Replay	Mansfield Town (4)	1–4	Oldham Athletic (3)	Field Mill, Mansfield
19:45	Dyer 12'	Report	Philliskirk 57'; Clarke-Harris 62'; Lanzoni 76'; Rooney 80' (pen.)	Attendance: 2,836

30 November 2013	Rotherham United (3)	1–2	Rochdale (4)	New York Stadium, Rotherham
15:00	Frecklington 6'	Report	Lund 55'; Vincenti 83'	Attendance: 4,957; Referee: Graham Scott

30 November 2013	Peterborough United (3)	5–0	Tranmere Rovers (3)	London Road, Peterborough
15:00	Assombalonga 38', 64', 73'; Jeffers 45+3', 90+2'	Report		Attendance: 3,269; Referee: Michael Naylor

30 November 2013	Hartlepool United (4)	1–1	Coventry City (3)	Victoria Park, Hartlepool
15:00	Monkhouse 78'	Report	Baker 12'	Attendance: 2,898; Referee: Andy Madley

10 December 2013 Replay	Coventry City (3)	2–1	Hartlepool United (4)	Sixfields Stadium, Northampton
19:45	L. Clarke 36', 90+3'	Report	Baldwin 88'	Attendance: 1,214

30 November 2013	Kidderminster Harriers (5)	4–2	Newport County (4)	Aggborough Stadium, Kidderminster
15:00	Gash 19', 63'; Gittings 28', 43'	Report	Willmott 79', 83'	Attendance: 2,636; Referee: Mark Heywood

30 November 2013	Plymouth Argyle (4)	3–1	Welling United (5)	Home Park, Plymouth
15:00	Gurrieri 13'; Nelson 18'; Alessandra 21'	Report	Lafayette 53'	Attendance: 4,706; Referee: Stephen Bratt

30 November 2013	Fleetwood Town (4)	1–1	Burton Albion (4)	Highbury Stadium, Fleetwood
15:00	Hughes 83'	Report	Kee 90+3'	Attendance: 2,119; Referee: Eddie Ilderton

10 December 2013 Replay	Burton Albion (4)	1–0	Fleetwood Town (4)	Pirelli Stadium, Burton upon Trent
19:45	Kee 24'	Report		Attendance: 1,777

30 November 2013	Grimsby Town (5)	2–0	Northampton Town (4)	Blundell Park, Cleethorpes
15:00	Pearson 64'; McLaughlin 90+5'	Report		Attendance: 3,828; Referee: Scott Mathieson

30 November 2013	Leyton Orient (3)	1–0	Walsall (3)	Matchroom Stadium, Leyton
15:00	Cox 41'	Report		Attendance: 2,604; Referee: Mark Brown

30 November 2013	Stevenage (3)	4–0	Stourbridge (7)	Lamex Stadium, Stevenage
15:00	Zoko 44'; Akins 49'; Freeman 60'; Morais 90' (pen.)	Report		Attendance: 2,160; Referee: Tim Robinson

1 December 2013	Cambridge United (5)	0–2	Sheffield United (3)	Abbey Stadium, Cambridge
12:00			Baxter 12'; Murphy 58'	Attendance: 4,593; Referee: Oliver Langford

1 December 2013	Tamworth (5)	1–2	Bristol City (3)	The Lamb Ground, Tamworth
14:00	Todd 90+1'	Report	Emmanuel-Thomas 36'; Baldock 83'	Attendance: 2,860; Referee: Andy D'Urso

9 December 2013	Wrexham (5)	1–2	Oxford United (4)	Racecourse Ground, Wrexham
19:45	Clarke 28'	Report	Constable 54'; Williams 56'	Attendance: 2,906; Referee: Gavin Ward

Notes

1. Match was abandoned in second half due to waterlogged pitch and was due to be replayed on 4 January 2014. However, on 3 January a pitch inspection postponed this match further to 8 January 2014.

== Third round Proper ==
The third round draw took place on Saturday 30 November at 23:00. A total of 64 teams competed, 20 of which had progressed from the second round proper along with 44 clubs from the Premier League and Football League Championship. The lowest ranked sides that qualified for this round were Kidderminster Harriers, Macclesfield Town and Grimsby Town; they were the only level 5 teams left in the competition.

4 January 2014	Blackburn Rovers (2)	1–1	Manchester City (1)	Ewood Park, Blackburn
12:45 GMT	Dann 55'	Report	Negredo 45+1'	Attendance: 18,813; Referee: Michael Oliver

15 January 2014 Replay	Manchester City (1)	5–0	Blackburn Rovers (2)	Etihad Stadium, Manchester
20:10 GMT	Negredo 45+1', 47'; Džeko 67', 79'; Agüero 73'	Report		Attendance: 33,102; Referee: Craig Pawson

4 January 2014	Stoke City (1)	2–1	Leicester City (2)	Britannia Stadium, Stoke-on-Trent
15:00 GMT	Jones 16'; Adam 55'	Report	Nugent 77'	Attendance: 16,844; Referee: Lee Probert

4 January 2014	Barnsley (2)	1–2	Coventry City (3)	Oakwell, Barnsley
15:00 GMT	O'Brien 19'	Report	Moussa 78'; L. Clarke 89'	Attendance: 7,439; Referee: Carl Boyeson

4 January 2014	Yeovil Town (2)	4–0	Leyton Orient (3)	Huish Park, Yeovil
15:00 GMT	Hayter 12', 60'; Grant 49'; Moore 90'	Report		Attendance: 3,667; Referee: Oliver Langford

4 January 2014	Bristol City (3)	1–1	Watford (2)	Ashton Gate Stadium, Bristol
15:00 GMT	Emmanuel-Thomas 85'	Report	Murray 84'	Attendance: 10,165; Referee: Paul Tierney

14 January 2014 Replay	Watford (2)	2–0	Bristol City (3)	Vicarage Road, Watford
19:45 GMT	Faraoni 29'; McGugan 64'	Report		Attendance: 7,302; Referee: Darren Drysdale

4 January 2014	Southend United (4)	4–1	Millwall (2)	Roots Hall, Southend-on-Sea
15:00 GMT	Corr 22'; Atkinson 45+6'; Timlin 56'; Leonard 90+5'	Report	Woolford 64'	Attendance: 7,923; Referee: James Adcock

4 January 2014	Middlesbrough (2)	0–2	Hull City (1)	Riverside Stadium, Middlesbrough
15:00 GMT		Report	McLean 10'; Proschwitz 61'	Attendance: 15,571; Referee: Kevin Friend

4 January 2014	West Bromwich Albion (1)	0–2	Crystal Palace (1)	The Hawthorns, West Bromwich
15:00 GMT		Report	Gayle 23'; Chamakh 90+5'	Attendance: 12,700; Referee: Phil Dowd

4 January 2014	Kidderminster Harriers (5)	0–0	Peterborough United (3)	Aggborough, Kidderminster
15:00 GMT		Report		Attendance: 3,858; Referee: Jonathan Moss

14 January 2014 Replay	Peterborough United (3)	2–3	Kidderminster Harriers (5)	London Road, Peterborough
19:45 GMT	Rowe 23'; Assombalonga 74' (pen.)	Report	Gash 48'; Byrne 51'; Lolley 76'	Attendance: 3,483; Referee: Andy D'Urso

4 January 2014	Doncaster Rovers (2)	2–3	Stevenage (3)	Keepmoat Stadium, Doncaster
15:00 GMT	Forrester 72'; Wakefield 90+5'	Report	Zoko 49'; Hartley 65'; Charles 90+1'	Attendance: 3,899; Referee: Scott Duncan

4 January 2014	Southampton (1)	4–3	Burnley (2)	St Mary's Stadium, Southampton
15:00 GMT	Clyne 22'; Lambert 38'; Rodriguez 66'; Lallana 73'	Report	Vokes 51'; Ings 57'; Long 87'	Attendance: 15,077; Referee: Robert Madley

4 January 2014	Newcastle United (1)	1–2	Cardiff City (1)	St. James' Park, Newcastle upon Tyne
15:00 GMT	Cissé 62'	Report	Noone 73'; Campbell 80'	Attendance: 31,166; Referee: Anthony Taylor

4 January 2014	Rochdale (4)	2–0	Leeds United (2)	Spotland Stadium, Rochdale
15:00 GMT	Hogan 45+2'; Henderson 84'	Report		Attendance: 8,255; Referee: Mike Jones

4 January 2014	Wigan Athletic (2)	3–3	Milton Keynes Dons (3)	DW Stadium, Wigan
15:00 GMT	Espinoza 18'; Gómez 27'; McManaman 65'	Report	Reeves 45', 45+2'; Bamford 84'	Attendance: 6,960; Referee: Roger East

14 January 2014 Replay	Milton Keynes Dons (3)	1–3 (a.e.t.)	Wigan Athletic (2)	Stadium mk, Milton Keynes
19:45 GMT	Chadwick 10'	Report	Powell 79', 92'; Fortuné 105'	Attendance: 8,316; Referee: James Adcock

4 January 2014	Norwich City (1)	1–1	Fulham (1)	Carrow Road, Norwich
15:00 GMT	Snodgrass 44'	Report	Bent 39'	Attendance: 21,703; Referee: Craig Pawson

14 January 2014 Replay	Fulham (1)	3–0	Norwich City (1)	Craven Cottage, Fulham
19:45 GMT	Bent 17'; Dejagah 41'; Sidwell 68'	Report		Attendance: 11,172; Referee: Lee Mason

4 January 2014	Aston Villa (1)	1–2	Sheffield United (3)	Villa Park, Birmingham
15:00 GMT	Helenius 74'	Report	Murphy 20'; Flynn 80'	Attendance: 24,038; Referee: David Coote

4 January 2014	Macclesfield Town (5)	1–1	Sheffield Wednesday (2)	Moss Rose, Macclesfield
15:00 GMT	Williams 71'	Report	Ré. Johnson 24'	Attendance: 5,873; Referee: Lee Mason

14 January 2014 Replay	Sheffield Wednesday (2)	4–1	Macclesfield Town (5)	Hillsborough, Sheffield
19:45 GMT	Maguire 3'; Maghoma 78'; J. Johnson 85'; Llera 90+1'	Report	Boden 65' (pen.)	Attendance: 12,302; Referee: Nigel Miller

4 January 2014	Bolton Wanderers (2)	2–1	Blackpool (2)	Reebok Stadium, Bolton
15:00 GMT	Ngog 9'; Beckford 50'	Report	Barkhuizen 45+1'	Attendance: 11,180; Referee: Simon Hooper

4 January 2014	Everton (1)	4–0	Queens Park Rangers (2)	Goodison Park, Liverpool
15:00 GMT	Barkley 34'; Jelavić 43', 67'; Coleman 75'	Report		Attendance: 32,283; Referee: Howard Webb

4 January 2014	Brighton & Hove Albion (2)	1–0	Reading (2)	Falmer Stadium, Brighton
15:00 GMT	Crofts 32'	Report		Attendance: 20,696; Referee: Chris Foy

4 January 2014	Grimsby Town (5)	2–3	Huddersfield Town (2)	Blundell Park, Cleethorpes
15:00 GMT	Hannah 25'; Disley 62'	Report	Norwood 51'; Paterson 86'; Thomas 90' (o.g.)	Attendance: 6,504; Referee: Keith Stroud

4 January 2014	Ipswich Town (2)	1–1	Preston North End (3)	Portman Road, Ipswich
15:00 GMT	McGoldrick 38'	Report	K. Davies 42'	Attendance: 13,534; Referee: Michael Naylor

14 January 2014 Replay	Preston North End (3)	3–2	Ipswich Town (2)	Deepdale, Preston
19:45 GMT	Garner 67', 68', 88'	Report	Nouble 58'; McGoldrick 76'	Attendance: 6,088; Referee: Keith Stroud

4 January 2014	Arsenal (1)	2–0	Tottenham Hotspur (1)	Emirates Stadium, London
17:15 GMT	Cazorla 31'; Rosický 62'	Report		Attendance: 59,476; Referee: Mark Clattenburg

5 January 2014	Nottingham Forest (2)	5–0	West Ham United (1)	City Ground, Nottingham
12:00 GMT	Abdoun 12' (pen.); Paterson 65', 71', 79'; Reid 90+1'	Report		Attendance: 14,397; Referee: Martin Atkinson

5 January 2014	Sunderland (1)	3–1	Carlisle United (3)	Stadium of Light, Sunderland
14:00 GMT	Johnson 34'; O'Hanlon 50' (o.g.); Ba 90'	Report	Robson 43'	Attendance: 21,973; Referee: Neil Swarbrick

5 January 2014	Derby County (2)	0–2	Chelsea (1)	Pride Park, Derby
14:15 GMT		Report	Mikel 66'; Oscar 71'	Attendance: 32,110; Referee: Andre Marriner

5 January 2014	Liverpool (1)	2–0	Oldham Athletic (3)	Anfield, Liverpool
15:00 GMT	Aspas 54'; Tarkowski 82' (o.g.)	Report		Attendance: 44,102; Referee: Stuart Attwell

5 January 2014	Port Vale (3)	2–2	Plymouth Argyle (4)	Vale Park, Burslem
15:00 GMT	Tomlin 15'; Pope 36'	Report	Reid 51'; Purrington 74'	Attendance: 5,511; Referee: David Webb

14 January 2014 Replay	Plymouth Argyle (4)	2–3	Port Vale (3)	Home Park, Plymouth
19:45	Gurrieri 2'; Hourihane 35'	Report	Hugill 30'; Williamson 63'; Myrie-Williams 76'	Attendance: 6,474; Referee: Graham Scott

5 January 2014	Manchester United (1)	1–2	Swansea City (1)	Old Trafford, Manchester
16:30 GMT	Hernández 16'	Report	Routledge 12'; Bony 90'	Attendance: 73,190; Referee: Mike Dean

14 January 2014	Charlton Athletic (2)	2–2	Oxford United (4)	The Valley, London
19:45 GMT	Morrison 54'; Kermorgant 82'		Mullins 13'; Davies 24'	Attendance: 5,566; Referee: Stephen Martin

21 January 2014 Replay	Oxford United (4)	0–3	Charlton Athletic (2)	Kassam Stadium, Oxford
19:45 GMT		Report	Kermorgant 35', 58'; Green 38'	Attendance: 3,225; Referee: David Coote

14 January 2014	Bournemouth (2)	4–1	Burton Albion (4)	Goldsands Stadium, Bournemouth
19:45 GMT	Pitman 5', 88' (pen.); Elphick 45'; Fraser 86'		Phillips 35'	Attendance: 10,343; Referee: Ian Williamson

14 January 2014	Birmingham City (2)	3–0	Bristol Rovers (4)	St Andrew's, Birmingham
19:45 GMT	Robinson 35'; Burke 85', 87'			Attendance: 9,914; Referee: Tony Harrington

== Fourth round Proper ==
The fourth round draw took place on Sunday 5 January 2014, live on ITV at 14:00. Kidderminster Harriers were the lowest ranked team to qualify for this round, the only non-league/level 5 team left in the competition.

24 January 2014	Arsenal (1)	4–0	Coventry City (3)	Emirates Stadium, London
19:45 GMT	Podolski 15', 27'; Giroud 84'; Cazorla 89'	Report		Attendance: 59,451; Referee: Robert Madley

24 January 2014	Nottingham Forest (2)	0–0	Preston North End (3)	City Ground, Nottingham
20:00 GMT		Report		Attendance: 26,465; Referee: Mike Dean

5 February 2014 Replay	Preston North End (3)	0–2	Nottingham Forest (2)	Deepdale, Preston
19:45 GMT		Report	Mackie 18'; Henderson 90+4'	Attendance: 9,744; Referee: Jonathan Moss

25 January 2014	Bournemouth (2)	0–2	Liverpool (1)	Goldsands Stadium, Bournemouth
12:45 GMT		Report	Moses 26'; Sturridge 60'	Attendance: 11,475; Referee: Lee Probert

25 January 2014	Sunderland (1)	1–0	Kidderminster Harriers (5)	Stadium of Light, Sunderland
15:00 GMT	Mavrias 5'	Report		Attendance: 25,081; Referee: Roger East

25 January 2014	Bolton Wanderers (2)	0–1	Cardiff City (1)	Reebok Stadium, Bolton
15:00 GMT		Report	Campbell 50'	Attendance: 12,750; Referee: Jonathan Moss

25 January 2014	Southampton (1)	2–0	Yeovil Town (2)	St Mary's Stadium, Southampton
15:00 GMT	do Prado 23' (pen.); Gallagher 70'	Report		Attendance: 24,070; Referee: Phil Dowd

25 January 2014	Huddersfield Town (2)	0–1	Charlton Athletic (2)	John Smith's Stadium, Huddersfield
15:00 GMT		Report	Church 54'	Attendance: 10,120; Referee: Stuart Attwell

25 January 2014	Port Vale (3)	1–3	Brighton & Hove Albion (2)	Vale Park, Burslem
15:00 GMT	Robertson 36'	Report	Ince 27'; March 43'; Obika 78'	Attendance: 7,293; Referee: Paul Tierney

25 January 2014	Southend United (4)	0–2	Hull City (1)	Roots Hall, Southend-on-Sea
15:00 GMT		Report	Fryatt 63', 90+1'	Attendance: 10,250; Referee: Lee Mason

25 January 2014	Rochdale (4)	1–2	Sheffield Wednesday (2)	Spotland Stadium, Rochdale
15:00 GMT	Rose 60'	Report	Mattock 51'; Onyewu 57'	Attendance: 8,240; Referee: Simon Hooper

25 January 2014	Wigan Athletic (2)	2–1	Crystal Palace (1)	DW Stadium, Wigan
15:00 GMT	Watson 36'; McClean 78'	Report	Wilbraham 69'	Attendance: 9,542; Referee: Mike Jones

25 January 2014	Manchester City (1)	4–2	Watford (2)	Etihad Stadium, Manchester
15:00 GMT	Agüero 60', 79', 90+2'; Kolarov 87'	Report	Forestieri 20'; Deeney 30'	Attendance: 46,514; Referee: Kevin Friend

25 January 2014	Birmingham City (2)	1–2	Swansea City (1)	St Andrew's, Birmingham
15:00 GMT	Novak 15'	Report	Bony 67', 69'	Attendance: 11,490; Referee: Neil Swarbrick

25 January 2014	Stevenage (3)	0–4	Everton (1)	Broadhall Way, Stevenage
17:30 GMT		Report	Naismith 5', 32'; Heitinga 55'; Gueye 84'	Attendance: 6,913; Referee: Anthony Taylor

26 January 2014	Sheffield United (3)	1–1	Fulham (1)	Bramall Lane, Sheffield
13:00 GMT	Porter 31'	Report	Rodallega 75'	Attendance: 16,324; Referee: Andre Marriner

4 February 2014 Replay	Fulham (1)	0–1 (a.e.t.)	Sheffield United (3)	Craven Cottage, London
19:45 GMT		Report	Miller 120'	Attendance: 10,139; Referee: Neil Swarbrick

26 January 2014	Chelsea (1)	1–0	Stoke City (1)	Stamford Bridge, London
15:30 GMT	Oscar 27'	Report		Attendance: 40,845; Referee: Chris Foy

== Fifth round Proper ==
The fifth round draw took place at Wembley Stadium on Sunday 26 January 2014. A total of 16 teams competed, all having progressed from the fourth round proper. The lowest ranked side qualified for this round were Sheffield United, the only level 3 team in the fifth round.

15 February 2014	Sunderland (1)	1–0	Southampton (1)	Stadium of Light, Sunderland
12:45 GMT	Gardner 49'	Report		Attendance: 16,777; Referee: Mike Dean

15 February 2014	Cardiff City (1)	1–2	Wigan Athletic (2)	Cardiff City Stadium, Cardiff
15:00 GMT	Campbell 27'	Report	McCann 18'; Watson 40'	Attendance: 17,123; Referee: Martin Atkinson

15 February 2014	Manchester City (1)	2–0	Chelsea (1)	Etihad Stadium, Manchester
17:15 GMT	Jovetić 16'; Nasri 67'	Report		Attendance: 47,013; Referee: Phil Dowd

16 February 2014	Everton (1)	3–1	Swansea City (1)	Goodison Park, Liverpool
13:30 GMT	Traoré 5'; Naismith 65'; Baines 72' (pen.)	Report	de Guzmán 16'	Attendance: 31,498; Referee: Kevin Friend

16 February 2014	Sheffield United (3)	3–1	Nottingham Forest (2)	Bramall Lane, Sheffield
15:00 GMT	Coady 66'; Porter 90' (pen.), 90+2'	(Report)	Paterson 28'	Attendance: 25,118; Referee: Michael Oliver

16 February 2014	Arsenal (1)	2–1	Liverpool (1)	Emirates Stadium, London
16:00 GMT	Chamberlain 16'; Podolski 47'	Report	Gerrard 59' (pen.)	Attendance: 59,801; Referee: Howard Webb

17 February 2014	Brighton & Hove Albion (2)	1–1	Hull City (1)	Falmer Stadium, Brighton
19:45 GMT	Ulloa 30'	Report	Sagbo 86'	Attendance: 21,352; Referee: Lee Probert

24 February 2014 Replay	Hull City (1)	2–1	Brighton & Hove Albion (2)	KC Stadium, Kingston upon Hull
19:45 GMT	Davies 14'; Koren 36'	Report	Ulloa 69'	Attendance: 10,795; Referee: Andre Marriner

24 February 2014	Sheffield Wednesday (2)	1–2	Charlton Athletic (2)	Hillsborough, Sheffield
19:45 GMT	Best 57'	Report	Harriott 22'; Church 65'	Attendance: 24,607; Referee: Mark Clattenburg

== Sixth round Proper ==
The draw for the sixth round took place on Sunday 16 February 2014. The lowest-ranked side qualified for this round were again Sheffield United, the only level 3 team left in the competition.

8 March 2014	Arsenal (1)	4–1	Everton (1)	Emirates Stadium, London
12:45 GMT	Özil 7'; Arteta 68' (pen.); Giroud 83', 85'	Report	Lukaku 32'	Attendance: 59,719; Referee: Mark Clattenburg

9 March 2014	Sheffield United (3)	2–0	Charlton Athletic (2)	Bramall Lane, Sheffield
12:00 GMT	Flynn 66'; Brayford 67'	Report		Attendance: 30,048; Referee: Lee Mason

9 March 2014	Hull City (1)	3–0	Sunderland (1)	KC Stadium, Kingston upon Hull
14:00 GMT	Davies 69'; Meyler 72'; Fryatt 77'	Report		Attendance: 20,047; Referee: Craig Pawson

9 March 2014	Manchester City (1)	1–2	Wigan Athletic (2)	Etihad Stadium, Manchester
16:05 GMT	Nasri 68'	Report	Gómez 27' (pen.); Perch 47'	Attendance: 46,824; Referee: Anthony Taylor

== Semi-finals ==
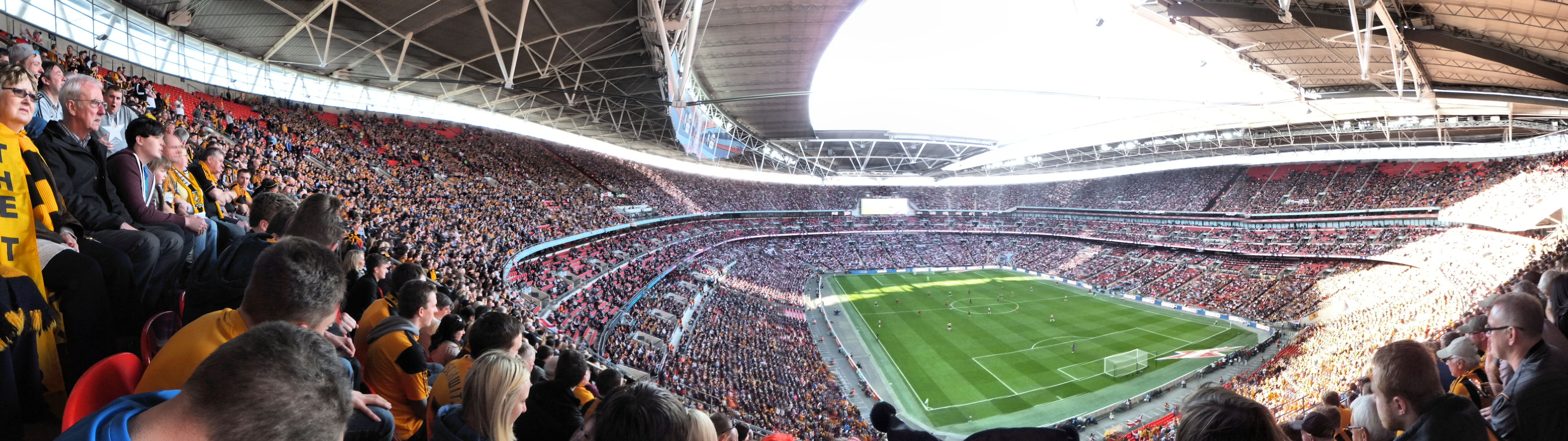
The second of the 2013–14 semi-finals as Hull City face Sheffield United at Wembley Stadium

The draw for the semi-finals took place at Wembley Stadium, London on Sunday 9 March 2014. A total of four teams competed, all of them progressing from the sixth round proper. The lowest-ranked team qualified for this round was Sheffield United, the only level 3 team in the semi-finals. The matches were delayed by 7 minutes to mark the 25th anniversary of the Hillsborough Disaster, which took place on 15 April 1989 in an FA Cup semi-final match between Nottingham Forest and Liverpool, claiming 97 lives.

12 April 2014	Wigan Athletic (2)	1–1 (a.e.t.) (2–4 p)	Arsenal (1)	Wembley Stadium, London
17:07 BST	Gómez 63' (pen.)	Report	Mertesacker 82'	Attendance: 82,185; Referee: Michael Oliver
	Penalties
	Caldwell (penalty missed); Collison (penalty missed); Beausejour (penalty scored); McArthur (penalty scored)		(penalty scored) Arteta; (penalty scored) Källström; (penalty scored) Giroud; (penalty scored) Cazorla

13 April 2014	Hull City (1)	5–3	Sheffield United (3)	Wembley Stadium, London
16:07 BST	Sagbo 42'; Fryatt 49'; Huddlestone 54'; Quinn 67'; Meyler 90+3'	Report	Baxter 19'; Scougall 44'; Murphy 90'	Attendance: 71,820; Referee: Andre Marriner

== Final ==
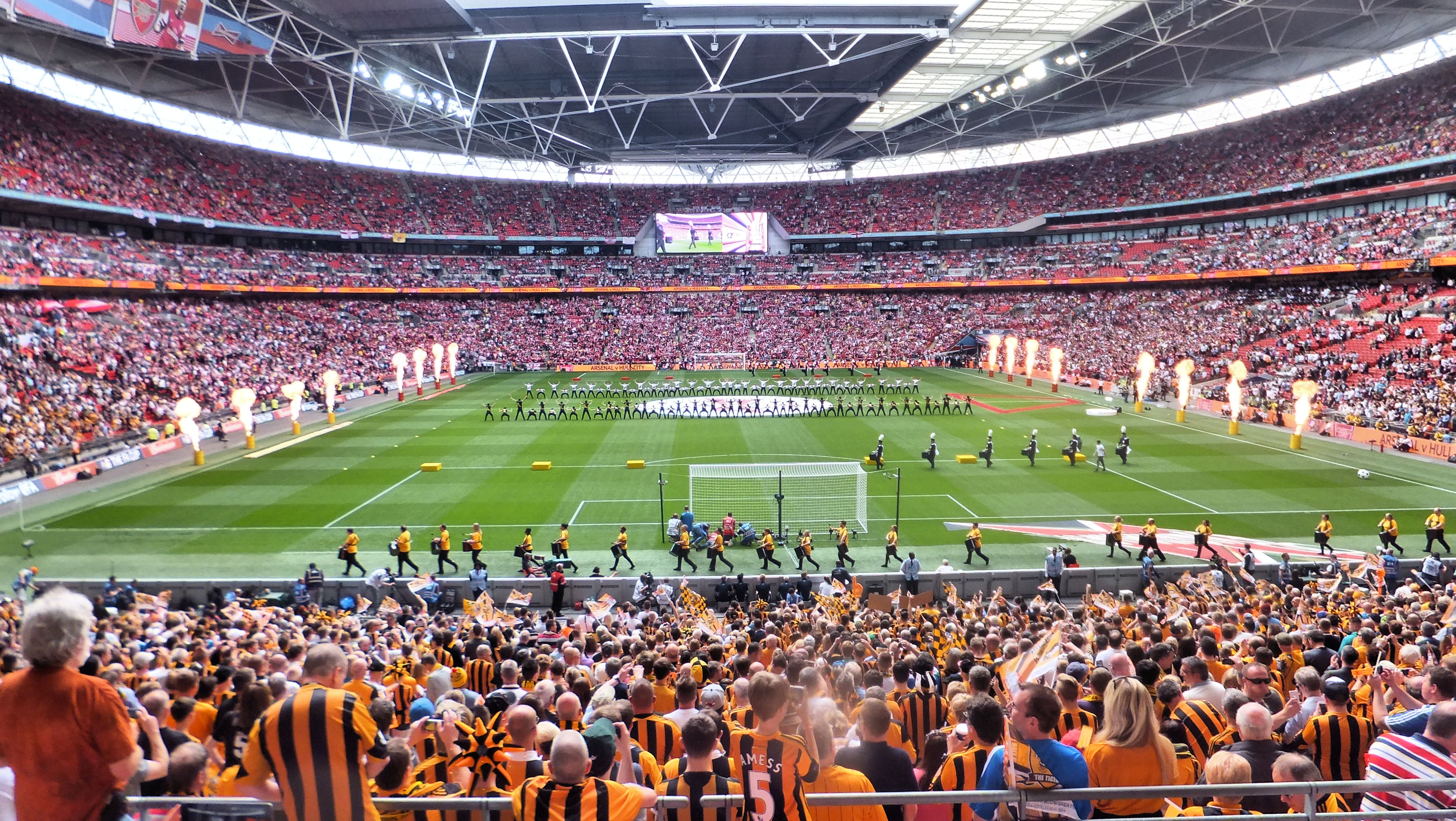
Before kick off as Arsenal face Hull City in the 2013–14 FA Cup Final at Wembley Stadium

17 May 2014
17:00 BST

Arsenal	3–2 (a.e.t.)	Hull City
Cazorla 17'; Koscielny 71'; Ramsey 109'	Report; Statistics	Chester 4'; Davies 8'

Wembley Stadium, London
Attendance: 89,345
Referee: Lee Probert (Wiltshire)

== Top scorers ==
As of 13 April 2014

Rank	Player	Club	Goals
1	(Democratic Republic of the Congo) Britt Assombalonga	Peterborough United	5
1	(England) Sam Clucas	Mansfield Town	5
1	(England) Joe Garner	Preston North End	5
4	(Argentina) Sergio Agüero	Manchester City	4
4	(England) Jay Emmanuel-Thomas	Bristol City	4
4	(England) Matty Fryatt	Hull City	4
4	(England) Jamie Paterson	Nottingham Forest	4
4	(England) Chris Porter	Sheffield United	4
4	(England) Reuben Reid	Plymouth Argyle	4
4	(Ivory Coast) François Zoko	Stevenage	4

== Broadcasting rights ==
The domestic broadcasting rights for the competition were held by the free-to-air channel ITV and the new subscription channel BT Sport. ITV had held the rights since 2008–09, while BT Sport bought ESPN's remaining FA Cup rights in February 2013. The FA Cup Final had to be broadcast live on UK terrestrial television under the Ofcom code of protected sporting events.

These matches were broadcast live on UK television:

Round	Date	Teams	Kick-off	Channels	
Round	Date	Teams	Kick-off	Digital	TV
First Round	8 November	Wimbledon v Coventry City	19:45	BT Sport App	BT Sport 1
First Round	10 November	Bishop's Stortford v Northampton Town	14:00	ITV Hub	ITV
First Round	11 November	Shortwood United v Port Vale	19:45	BT Sport App	BT Sport 1
First Round (Replay)	18 November	Brackley Town v Gillingham	19:45	BT Sport App	BT Sport 1
First Round (Replay)	5 December	Gateshead v Oxford United	19:45	BT Sport App	BT Sport 1
Second Round	8 December	Wrexham v Oxford United	12:00	BT Sport App	BT Sport 1
Second Round	8 December	Tamworth v Bristol City	14:00	ITV Hub	ITV
Second Round	9 December	Cambridge United v Sheffield United	19:45	BT Sport App	BT Sport 1
Second Round (Replay)	17 December	Mansfield Town v Oldham Athletic	19:45	BT Sport App	BT Sport 1
Second Round (Replay)	18 December	Crawley Town v Bristol Rovers	19:45	BT Sport App	BT Sport 1
Third Round	4 January	Blackburn Rovers v Manchester City	12:45	BT Sport App	BT Sport 1
Third Round	4 January	Arsenal v Tottenham Hotspur	17:15	ITV Hub	ITV
Third Round	5 January	Nottingham Forest v West Ham United	12:00	ITV Hub	ITV
Third Round	5 January	Derby County v Chelsea	14:15	BT Sport App	BT Sport 1
Third Round	5 January	Manchester United v Swansea City	16:30	BT Sport App	BT Sport 1
Third Round (Replay)	14 January	Fulham v Norwich City	19:45	BT Sport App	BT Sport 1
Third Round (Replay)	15 January	Manchester City v Blackburn Rovers	20:10	ITV Hub	ITV
Fourth Round	24 January	Arsenal v Coventry City	19:45	BT Sport App	BT Sport 1
Fourth Round	25 January	Bournemouth v Liverpool	12:45	ITV Hub	ITV
Fourth Round	25 January	Stevenage v Everton	17:30	BT Sport App	BT Sport 1
Fourth Round	26 January	Sheffield United v Fulham	13:00	BT Sport App	BT Sport 1
Fourth Round	26 January	Chelsea v Stoke City	15:30	ITV Hub	ITV
Fourth Round (Replay)	4 February	Fulham v Sheffield United	19:45	ITV Hub	ITV4
Fourth Round (Replay)	5 February	Preston North End v Nottingham Forest	19:45	BT Sport App	BT Sport 1
Fifth Round	15 February	Sunderland v Southampton	12:45	BT Sport App	BT Sport 1
Fifth Round	15 February	Manchester City v Chelsea	17:15	ITV Hub	ITV
Fifth Round	16 February	Everton v Swansea City	13:30	ITV Hub	ITV
Fifth Round	16 February	Arsenal v Liverpool	16:00	BT Sport App	BT Sport 1
Fifth Round	17 February	Brighton & Hove Albion v Hull City	19:45	BT Sport App	BT Sport 1
Fifth Round (Replay)	24 February	Hull City v Brighton & Hove Albion	19:45	ITV Hub	ITV4
Sixth Round	8 March	Arsenal v Everton	12:45	ITV Hub	ITV
Sixth Round	9 March	Sheffield United v Charlton Athletic	12:00	BT Sport App	BT Sport 1
Sixth Round	9 March	Hull City v Sunderland	14:00	ITV Hub	ITV
Sixth Round	9 March	Manchester City v Wigan Athletic	16:05	BT Sport App	BT Sport 1
Semi-Finals	12 April	Wigan Athletic v Arsenal	17:07	ITV Hub	ITV
Semi-Finals	13 April	Hull City v Sheffield United	16:07	BT Sport App	BT Sport 1
Final	17 May	Arsenal v Hull City	17:00	ITV Hub	ITV
Final	17 May	Arsenal v Hull City	17:00	STV Player	STV
Final	17 May	Arsenal v Hull City	17:00	BT Sport App	BT Sport 1
