= 2013–14 Mansfield Town F.C. season =

Mansfield Town
2013–14 season
- Chairman: John Radford
- Manager: Paul Cox
- Stadium: Field Mill
- Football League Two: 11th
- FA Cup: 2nd round replay (lost to Oldham Athletic 4–1)
- League Cup: 1st Round (lost 2–0 to Tranmere Rovers)
- Football League Trophy: 2nd Round (lost 1–0 to Chesterfield)
- Top goalscorer: League: Sam Clucas (8); All: Sam Clucas (13)
- Highest home attendance: 5,931 (Chesterfield in the League Two)
- Lowest home attendance: 2,549 (Accrington Stanley League Two)
- Average home league attendance: 3,385.2
| Home colours | Away colours |

The 2013–2014 Season of Mansfield Town F.C. was its first back in the Football League, following promotion as champions from the Blue Square Bet Premier at the end of the 2012–13 season. The club also took part in the FA Cup, the League Cup and the Football League Trophy. The club played its home games at Field Mill, renamed the One Call Stadium for sponsorship reasons, the oldest ground in the Football League.

== Goal scorers ==
| Name | League Goals | FA Cup Goals | FLT Goals | LC Goals | Total |
|---|---|---|---|---|---|
| Sam Clucas | 8 | 5 | 0 | 0 | 13 |
| Ben Hutchinson | 2 | 0 | 0 | 0 | 2 |
| Ollie Palmer | 4 | 1 | 0 | 0 | 5 |
| Matt Rhead | 6 | 0 | 0 | 0 | 6 |
| Lindon Meikle | 1 | 0 | 0 | 0 | 1 |
| Jamie McGuire | 2 | 0 | 0 | 0 | 2 |
| Calvin Andrew | 1 | 0 | 0 | 0 | 1 |
| Lee Stevenson | 5 | 1 | 0 | 0 | 6 |
| Colin Daniel | 2 | 1 | 0 | 0 | 3 |
| Anthony Howell | 3 | 1 | 0 | 0 | 4 |
| Chris Clements | 1 | 0 | 0 | 0 | 1 |
| Ross Dyer | 2 | 1 | 0 | 0 | 3 |
| John McCombe | 2 | 0 | 0 | 0 | 2 |
| James Jennings | 4 | 0 | 0 | 0 | 4 |
| Ryan Tafazolli | 2 | 0 | 0 | 0 | 2 |
| Adam Murray | 1 | 0 | 0 | 0 | 1 |
| Martin Riley | 1 | 0 | 0 | 0 | 1 |
| Jake Speight | 1 | 0 | 0 | 0 | 1 |
| Total | 48 | 10 | 0 | 0 | 58 |

== Transfers ==
=== In ===
| Date announced | Player | Previous club | Sources |
|---|---|---|---|
| 13 May 2013 | Jamie McGuire | Fleetwood Town | |
| 13 May 2013 | Ben Birch; Jason Gregory; Liam Marsden | Youth Team | |
| 22 May 2013 | Paul Black | Tranmere Rovers | |
| 23 May 2013 | Jack Thomas | Youth Team | |
| 28 May 2013 | Keiran Murtagh | Macclesfield Town | |
| 1 June 2013 | John McCombe | Port Vale | |
| 3 June 2013 | Martin Riley | Wrexham | |
| 21 June 2013 | Sam Clucas | Hereford United | |
| 18 October 2013 | Jack Blake (1 month loan) | Nottingham Forest | |
| 31 October 2013 | James Alabi (1 month loan) | Stoke City | |
| 28 November 2013 | Darryl Westlake (Season loan) | Sheffield United FC | |
| 21 February 2014 | Michael Cain (1 month loan) | Leicester City | |

=== Out ===
| Date announced | Player | Destination | Sources |
|---|---|---|---|
| 30 April 2013 | John Thompson | Retirement | |
| 3 May 2013 | Paul Bolland; Jamie Hand; Andy Owens; Shane Redmond; Gary Roberts; Jamie Tolley; Nick Wright | Released | |
| 18 May 2013 | Exodus Geohaghon | Released | |
| 21 May 2013 | Luke Jones | Stevenage | |
| 3 July 2013 | Matt Green | Birmingham City | |
| 11 July 2013 | Andy Todd | Released | |
| 11 November 2013 | Jason Gregory | Released | |
| 6 January 2014 | Calvin Andrew | Released | |
| 12 January 2014 | John McCombe | York City | |

== Pre-season ==
=== Tour of Malta ===
| Date | Kick-off | Opponents | H / A | Result F–A | Scorers | Attendance | Notes |
|---|---|---|---|---|---|---|---|
| 6 July 2013 | 20:45 | Naxxar Lions | A | 0–0 | | ~400 (~300) | |

=== Green Energy Cup ===
† Trialist, ‡ Youth Team player

| Date | Kick-off | Opponents | H / A | Result F–A | Scorers | Attendance | Notes |
|---|---|---|---|---|---|---|---|
| 23 July 2013 | 19:30 | Rainworth Miners Welfare | A | 4–0 | Hutchinson 5', 32', Dyer 25', Ball† 37' | 232 | |

=== Other friendlies ===
† Trialist, ‡ Youth Team player

| Date | Kick-off | Opponents | H / A | Result F–A | Scorers | Attendance | Notes |
|---|---|---|---|---|---|---|---|
| 10 July 2013 | 19:30 | Worksop Town | A | 1–4 | Robertson† 74' | | |
| 13 July 2013 | 15:00 | Nottingham Forest | H | 0–1 | | 3993 (1482) | |
| 16 July 2013 | 19:30 | Chester | A | 1–0 | Arnold† 75' | 802 | |
| 17 July 2013 | 19:30 | Peterborough United | H | 4–2 | Dempster 15', Daniel 30', Clucas 82', 89' | | |
| 20 July 2013 | 15:00 | Sheffield United | H | 0–1 | | | |
| 26 July 2013 | 19:30 | Coventry City | H | 2–3 | Todd 22', Clucas 48' | 1,012 (121) | |
| 27 July 2013 | 15:00 | Boston United | A | 1–3 | Hutchinson 76' | | |
| 30 July 2013 | 19:30 | Gainsborough Trinity | A | 5–0 | | | |

== League Two ==
=== Matches ===
| Date | Kick-off | Opponents | H / A | Result F–A | Scorers | Att. | Notes |
|---|---|---|---|---|---|---|---|
| 3 Aug | 15:00 | Scunthorpe United | A | 0–2 | | 5,241 | |
| 10 Aug | 15:00 | Exeter City | H | 0–0 | | 3,284 | |
| 17 Aug | 15:00 | Wycombe Wanderers | A | 1–0 | Palmer | 3,352 | |
| 24 Aug | 15:00 | Portsmouth | H | 2–2 | Hutchinson, Meikle | 4,574 | |
| 31 Aug | 15:00 | Dagenham & Redbridge | H | 3–0 | Clucas, McGuire, Rhead | 3,015 | |
| 7 Sep | 15:00 | Newport County | A | 1–1 | Clucas | 3,709 | |
| 14 Sep | 15:00 | York City | A | 2–1 | Clucas, Palmer | 3,513 | |
| 21 Sep | 15:00 | Northampton Town | H | 3–0 | Hutchinson, Clucas, Kouo-Doumbe (OG) | 3,469 | |
| 28 Sep | 13:00 | Chesterfield | A | 1–0 | Andrew | 10,015 | |
| 5 Oct | 15.00 | Hartlepool United | H | 1–4 | Clucas | 3,457 | |
| 12 Oct | 15.00 | Bristol Rovers | H | 1–1 | Stevenson | 3,275 | |
| 19 Oct | 15.00 | Torquay United | A | 0–0 | | 2,473 | |
| 22 Oct | 19.45 | Bury | A | 0–0 | | 2,518 | |
| 26 Oct | 15.00 | Plymouth Argyle | H | 0–1 | | 3,379 | |
| 1 Nov | 19.45 | Southend United | A | 0–3 | | 4,824 | |
| 16 Nov | 15.00 | Oxford United | H | 1–3 | Stevenson | 3,831 | |
| 23 Nov | 15.00 | Fleetwood Town | A | 4–5 | Clements, Howell, Clucas, Dyer | 2,831 | |
| 26 Nov | 19.45 | Burton Albion | A | 0–1 | | 2,751 | |
| 30 Nov | 15.00 | Morecambe | H | 1–2 | Dyer | 2,753 | |
| 14 Dec | 15.00 | AFC Wimbledon | A | 0–0 | | 3,900 | |
| 21 Dec | 15.00 | Accrington Stanley | H | 2–3 | McCombe x2 | 2,549 | |
| 26 Dec | 19.45 | Rochdale | A | 0–3 | | 2,671 | |
| 29 Dec | 15.00 | Cheltenham Town | A | 2–1 | Howell, Rhead | 2,928 | |
| 1 Jan | 15.00 | Burton Albion | H | 0–0 | | 3,266 | |
| 4 Jan | 15.00 | Exeter City | A | 1–0 | Stevenson | 3,303 | |
| 11 Jan | 15.00 | Scunthorpe United | H | 0–2 | | 4,115 | |
| 18 Jan | 15.00 | Portsmouth | A | 1–1 | Stevenson | 14,686 | |
| 25 Jan | 15.00 | Wycombe Wanderers | H | 2–2 | Stevenson, Palmer | 2,789 | |
| 28 Jan | 19.45 | Bury | H | Postponed due to waterlogged pitch | | | |
| 1 Feb | 15.00 | Plymouth | A | 1–1 | Rhead | 6,248 | |
| 8 Feb | 15.00 | Southend | H | 2–1 | Clucas, Jennings | 3,055 | |
| 11 Feb | 19.45 | Bury (rearranged) | H | Postponed due to waterlogged pitch | | | |
| 15 Feb | 15.00 | Oxford United | A | 0–3 | | 5,108 | |
| 22 Feb | 15.00 | Fleetwood Town | H | 1–0 | Rhead | 2,759 | |
| 25 Feb | 19.45 | Bury (rearranged) | H | 1–4 | Clucas | 2,628 | |
| 1 Mar | 15.00 | Dagenham & Redbridge | A | 0–0 | | 1,377 | |
| 8 Mar | 15.00 | Newport County | H | 2–1 | Tafazolli, Howell | 2,756 | |
| 11 Mar | 19.45 | York City | H | 0–1 | | 2,865 | |
| 15 Mar | 15.00 | Northampton Town | A | 1–1 | Palmer | 5,129 | |
| 22 Mar | 15.00 | Chesterfield | H | 0–0 | | 5,931 | |
| 25 Mar | 19.45 | Hartlepool United | A | 4–2 | Jennings x2, Rhead, McGuire | 2,976 | |
| 29 Mar | 15.00 | AFC Wimbledon | H | 1–0 | Murray | 3,292 | |
| 5 Apr | 15.00 | Morecambe | A | 1–0 | Daniel | 1,772 | |
| 12 Apr | 15.00 | Rochdale | H | 3–0 | Riley, Rhead, Tafazolli | 3,843 | |
| 18 Apr | 15.00 | Accrington Stanley | A | 1–1 | Speight | 2,092 | |
| 21 Apr | 15.00 | Cheltenham Town | H | 0–2 | | 3,586 | |
| 26 Apr | 15.00 | Torquay United | H | 1–3 | Jennings | 3,389 | |
| 3 May | 15.00 | Bristol Rovers | A | 1–0 | Daniel | 10,594 | |

=== League table ===
| Pos | Team | Pld | W | D | L | GF | GA | GD | Pts |
|---|---|---|---|---|---|---|---|---|---|
| 9 | Dagenham & Redbridge | 46 | 15 | 15 | 16 | 53 | 59 | −6 | 60 |
| 10 | Plymouth Argyle | 46 | 16 | 12 | 18 | 51 | 58 | −7 | 60 |
| 11 | Mansfield Town | 46 | 15 | 15 | 16 | 49 | 58 | −9 | 60 |
| 12 | Bury | 46 | 13 | 20 | 13 | 59 | 51 | +8 | 59 |
| 13 | Portsmouth | 46 | 14 | 17 | 15 | 56 | 66 | −10 | 59 |

Updated to match(es) played on 3 May 2014. Source: BBC Sport
Rules for classification: 1) Points; 2) Goal difference; 3) Number of goals scored

== FA Cup ==
| Round | Date | Kick-off | Opponents | H / A | Result F–A | Scorers | Attendance | Notes |
|---|---|---|---|---|---|---|---|---|
| Round 1 | 9 November 2013 | 15.00 | St Albans City | A | 8–1 | Stevenson, Howell, Daniel, Clucas, Palmer, Clucas x3 | 3,251 | |
| Round 2 | 7 December 2013 | 15.00 | Oldham Athletic | A | 1–1 | Clucas | 3,429 | |
| Round 2 Replay | 17 December 2013 | 19.45 | Oldham Athletic | H | 1–4 | Dyer | 2,836 | |

== League Cup ==
| Round | Date | Kick-off | Opponents | H / A | Result F–A | Scorers | Attendance | Notes |
|---|---|---|---|---|---|---|---|---|
| First Round | 6 August 2013 | 19:45 | Tranmere Rovers | A | 0–2 | | 3,067 | |

== Football League Trophy ==
| Round | Date | Kick-off | Opponents | H / A | Result F–A | Scorers | Attendance | Notes |
|---|---|---|---|---|---|---|---|---|
| First Round | Bye | | | | | | | |
| Second Round | 8 Oct | 7.45 | Chesterfield | H | 0–1 | | 4,834 | |
