= 1898–99 Brentford F.C. season =

English football team season

Brentford
1898–99 season
- Chairman: Bill Stephenson
- Stadium: Cross Roads
- Southern League Second Division London: 4th
- FA Cup: Third qualifying round
- London Senior Cup: First round
- Middlesex Senior Cup: Second round
- West Middlesex Cup: Semi-final
- Top goalscorer: League: Booth, Dailley, Ward (9); All: Booth, Dailley (12)

During the 1898–99 English football season, Brentford competed in the Southern League Second Division London. Though the season was largely viewed as a disappointment, the Bees finished in 4th place.

== Season summary ==
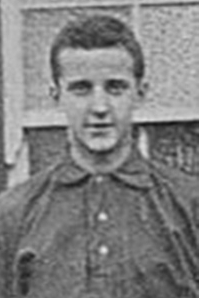
The 1898–99 season was half back Arthur Charlton's last with Brentford, after a career stretching back to 1892.

Brentford enjoyed a meteoric rise in London amateur football during a three-year period, going from playing only friendly and cup matches in 1895–96, to being promoted through the London League and elected into the Southern League for 1898–99 season. The club paid for its success and a number of its better players were lured away during the off-season, with forwards Oakey Field and David Lloyd turning professional and signing for Sheffield United and Thames Ironworks respectively. On the financial front, attendances had consistently improved year-on-year for the previous three seasons, but the leaseholder of the club's Shotter's Lane ground took the opportunity to increase the rent to an unacceptable amount. The club, which had made a loss on the previous season, were forced to move out of Brentford to Cross Roads, an unsatisfactory patch of ground located near South Ealing tube station. To compound the financial problems, while the club remained officially amateur, it was illegally forced to pay some of its new signings more than their travelling expenses to entice them to play.

Despite the goals of Oakey Field's replacement C. Ward, Brentford had a modest start to life in the London section of the Southern League Second Division, but after the departure of Ward in early November 1898, wins over Southall and St Albans put the club top of the division late in the month. The Bees subsequently fell away badly, taking just one point from a possible 10 over the next five matches. After winning two cups during the previous season, the club experienced little joy in 1898–99, suffering early exits in the FA Cup, London Senior Cup, Middlesex Senior Cup and suffering a semi-final defeat to Harrow Athletic in the West Middlesex Cup. The club entered the FA Amateur Cup for the only time, but withdrew after progressing to the second round. Though the season was largely a disappointment, Brentford finished in a credible 4th place in the London section of the Southern League Second Division.

== League table ==
Pos	Team	Pld	W	D	L	GF	GA	GR	Pts
2	Wolverton L&NWR	22	13	4	5	88	43	2.047	30
3	Watford	22	14	2	6	62	35	1.771	30
4	Brentford	22	11	3	8	59	39	1.513	25
5	Wycombe Wanderers	22	10	2	10	55	57	0.965	22
6	Southall	22	11	0	11	44	55	0.800	22

Source: rsssf.com
Rules for classification: The system of using goal average to separate two teams tied on points was used until the 1976-77 season. The points system: 2 points for a win, 1 point for a draw and 0 points for losing.

== Results ==
Brentford's goal tally listed first.

=== Legend ===
Win	Draw	Loss

=== Southern League Second Division London ===
No.	Date	Opponent	Venue	Result	Scorer(s)
1	10 September 1898	St Albans	H	6–1	Ward (3), Booth, Dailley, Richardson
2	17 September 1898	Fulham	A	4–1	Edney, Booth (2), Knapman
3	24 September 1898	Thames Ironworks	A	1–3	Tranter (og)
4	8 October 1898	Watford	H	2–4	Dailley (pen), Booth
5	15 October 1898	Wycombe Wanderers	H	9–2	Knapman, Ward (5), Richardson, Dailley (2, 1 pen)
6	5 November 1898	Wolverton London & North Western Railway	A	2–4	Dailley, Booth
7	12 November 1898	Southall	A	3–0	Booth, Richardson, Ward
8	24 November 1898	St Albans	A	5–4	McMillan, Dailley (2, 1 pen), Booth
9	3 December 1898	Uxbridge	A	0–3	
10	17 December 1898	Shepherds Bush	H	1–1	Johnson
11	24 December 1898	Watford	A	1–2	Evans
12	31 December 1898	Chesham	A	1–2	Dailley
13	11 February 1899	Thames Ironworks	H	0–2	
14	18 February 1899	Maidenhead	A	3–0	Walker, Booth, Robey (og)
15	25 February 1899	Fulham	H	2–1	Evans, Johnson
16	4 March 1899	Wolverton London & North Western Railway	H	3–3	Johnson, Knapman (2)
17	11 March 1899	Uxbridge	H	0–1	
18	18 March 1899	Shepherds Bush	A	2–1	Walker, Dailley
19	1 April 1899	Chesham	H	5–2	Knapman (2), Walker (pen), Westhead, Richardson
20	8 April 1899	Maidenhead	H	6–0	Evans, Johnson (2), Walker, Richardson
21	15 April 1899	Southall	H	2–1	Johnson (2)
22	22 April 1899	Wycombe Wanderers	A	1–1	Turner

=== FA Cup ===
Round	Date	Opponent	Venue	Result	Scorer(s)
3QR	29 October 1898	Clapton	A	1–6	Dailley

=== London Senior Cup ===
Round	Date	Opponent	Venue	Result	Scorer(s)
1R	14 January 1899	London Caledonians	H	1–6	Evans

=== Middlesex Senior Cup ===
Round	Date	Opponent	Venue	Result	Scorer(s)
1R	7 January 1899	Uxbridge	H	7–0	Evans, Dailley (2, 1 pen), Booth, Knapman (2), Johnson
2R	4 February 1899	Barnet	H	1–2	Johnson

=== West Middlesex Cup ===
Round	Date	Opponent	Venue	Result	Scorer(s)	Notes
1R	21 January 1899	Civil Service	H	4–3	Evans, Booth (2), Johnson	
SF	18 March 1899	Harrow Athletic	N	1–2 (a.e.t.)	Johnson	(Note: Match played at Hanwell, London.)

- Source: 100 Years of Brentford

== Playing squad ==
Note: Flags indicate national team as defined under FIFA eligibility rules; some limited exceptions apply. Players may hold more than one non-FIFA nationality.

Pos.	Nation	Player
GK	ENG	Ben Brown
GK	SCO	Frank Burton
GK	SCO	Henry Gill
GK	ENG	Charles Gillett
GK	ENG	Harry Pennington
DF	ENG	"Gosling"
DF	WAL	Frank Lewis
DF	ENG	Alfred Lugg
DF	ENG	George Pollitt
DF	ENG	Percy Swann
DF	SCO	George Turner
DF	ENG	Archie Williams
MF	SCO	Arthur Charlton
MF	ENG	George Haslen
MF	ENG	Alfred Mattocks
MF	ENG	William Mehew

Pos.	Nation	Player
MF	ENG	Billy Smith
MF	ENG	W. Walker
MF	ENG	William Westhead
FW	ENG	Ernest Booth
FW	ENG	J. Chambers
FW	ENG	John Cotton
FW	ENG	Richard Dailley
FW		Charlie Evans
FW	ENG	W. Hancock
FW	ENG	Frederick Johnson
FW	ENG	Thomas Knapman
FW		J. McMillan
FW	WAL	John Owen
FW	ENG	John Richardson
FW	SCO	James Rough

=== Left club during season ===
Note: Flags indicate national team as defined under FIFA eligibility rules; some limited exceptions apply. Players may hold more than one non-FIFA nationality.

Pos. / Nation / Player; MF / ENG / Herbert Edney (Retired)	Pos. / Nation / Player; FW / / C. Ward

- "Gosling" is an alias
- Source: 100 Years of Brentford

== Statistics ==

Brentford's highest appearance-makers in each position during the Southern League season.

=== Goalscorers ===
Pos.	Nat	Player	SL2	FAC	LSC	MSC	WMC	Total
FW	(England)	Ernest Booth	9	0	0	1	2	12
FW	(England)	Richard Dailley	9	1	0	2	0	12
FW	(England)	Frederick Johnson	7	0	0	2	2	11
FW	n/a	C. Ward	9	—	—	—	—	9
FW	(England)	Thomas Knapman	6	0	0	2	0	8
FW	(England)	John Richardson	6	0	0	0	0	6
FW	n/a	Charlie Evans	3	0	1	1	1	6
HB	(England)	W. Walker	4	0	0	0	0	4
HB	(England)	Herbert Edney	1	0	—	—	—	1
DF	(Scotland)	George Turner	1	0	—	0	0	1
FW	n/a	J. McMillan	1	0	0	0	0	1
HB	(England)	William Westhead	1	0	0	0	0	1
Opponents			2	0	0	0	0	2
Total			59	1	1	8	5	74

- Players listed in italics left the club mid-season.
- Source: 100 Years Of Brentford

=== Management ===
Name	From	To	Record All Comps					Record League				
Name	From	To	P	W	D	L	W %	P	W	D	L	W %
Committee	10 September 1898	22 April 1899	28	13	3	12	46.43	22	11	3	8	50.00

=== Summary ===
Games played	28 (22 Southern League Second Division London, 1 FA Cup, 1 London Senior Cup, 2 Middlesex Senior Cup, 2 West Middlesex Cup)
Games won	13 (11 Southern League Second Division London, 0 FA Cup, 0 London Senior Cup, 1 Middlesex Senior Cup, 1 West Middlesex Cup)
Games drawn	3 (3 Southern League Second Division London, 0 FA Cup, 0 London Senior Cup, 0 Middlesex Senior Cup, 0 West Middlesex Cup)
Games lost	12 (8 Southern League Second Division London, 1 FA Cup, 1 London Senior Cup, 1 Middlesex Senior Cup, 1 West Middlesex Cup)
Goals scored	74 (59 Southern League Second Division London, 1 FA Cup, 1 London Senior Cup, 8 Middlesex Senior Cup, 5 West Middlesex Cup)
Goals conceded	58 (39 Southern League Second Division London, 6 FA Cup, 6 London Senior Cup, 2 Middlesex Senior Cup, 5 West Middlesex Cup)
Clean sheets	4 (3 Southern League Second Division London, 0 FA Cup, 0 London Senior Cup, 1 Middlesex Senior Cup, 0 West Middlesex Cup)
Biggest league win	9–2 versus Wycombe Wanderers, 15 October 1898
Worst league defeat	3–0 versus Uxbridge, 3 December 1898
Most appearances	27, Richard Dailley (22 Southern League Second Division London, 1 FA Cup, 1 London Senior Cup, 2 Middlesex Senior Cup, 1 West Middlesex Cup)
Top scorer (league)	9, Ernest Booth, Richard Dailley, C. Ward
Top scorer (all competitions)	12, Ernest Booth, Richard Dailley
