= Great Western Suburban League =

- Founded: 1904
- First season: 1904–05
- Folded: 1931
- Country: England
- Divisions: One
- Domestic cup(s): FA Cup; FA Amateur Cup
- Most championships: Botwell Mission; Napier (4 titles each)

The Great Western Suburban League was a football league that was primarily held in the Home Counties, founded in 1904.

== History ==
The Great Western Suburban League was founded on the 18 May 1904, at a meeting called by Mr. W. G. Langdon of Staines which was held at the De Burgh Hotel in Yiewsley, Middlesex. It drew its membership from teams in the Home counties to the west of London, located near to the Great Western Railway. An initial rule of the league that stated that all clubs should have their grounds situated within about a mile of any Great Western Railway station between Paddington and Reading was amended in a special general meeting held at the Royal Hotel in Slough on 19 March 1914 to allow the admission into the league of Chesham Town and Newbury Town.

The league was generally considered by clubs to be a stepping stone to the Spartan League. After the 1926–27 season, all the member clubs left, with a new constitution of teams being formed for the following season. Following the 1930–31 season, in which only seven teams competed, the league folded.

== Champions ==
Season	Winner	Runners-up	Third place
1904–05	2nd Grenadier Guards	Maidenhead Norfolkians	Hounslow
1905–06	Hounslow	Brentford reserves	Maindehead Norfolkians
1906–07	Shepherd's Bush	Brentford reserves	Hounslow
1907–08	Brentford reserves	1st Grenadier Guards	Windsor & Eton
1908–09	Brentford reserves	Reading reserves	Wycombe Wanderers
1909–10	Reading reserves	Brentford reserves	Wycombe Wanderers
1910–11	Brentford reserves	Uxbridge	Southall
1911–12	2nd Grenadier Guards	Staines	Wycombe Wanderers
1912–13	Southall	19th Royal Hussars	Windsor & Eton
1913–14	19th Royal Hussars	Maidenhead Norfolkians	Southall
1914–19	Not held due to World War I		
1919–20	Maidenhead United	Botwell Mission	Slough
1920–21	Botwell Mission	Maidenhead United	Windsor & Eton
1921–22	Botwell Mission	Windsor & Eton	Uxbridge Town
1922–23	Botwell Mission	Staines Lagonda	Hounslow
1923–24	Botwell Mission	Staines Lagonda	Cowley
1924–25	Hounslow	Yiewsley	Newbury Town
1925–26	Newbury Town	Watford Old Boys	Yiewsley
1926–27	Leyland Motors	Newbury Town	Watford Old Boys reserves
1927–28	Napier	Holland Athletic reserves	Hounslow Rangers
1928–29	Napier	Roxeth & Harrow Old Boys	Holland Athletic reserves
1929–30	Napier	Ealing Celtic	Minters Athletic
1930–31	Napier	Feltham Sports	Ealing Celtic

== Member clubs ==
- 1st Coldstream Guards
- 1st Grenadier Guards
- 1st Irish Guards
- 1st Scots Guards
- 2nd Grenadier Guards
- 2nd Scots Guards
- 3rd Coldstream Guards
- 3rd Grenadier Guards
- 19th Royal Hussars
- Ashford
- Berkhamsted Town reserves
- Botwell Mission
- Botwell Mission reserves
- Brentford reserves
- Bush Hill Park reserves
- Chesham Town
- Chesham United reserves
- Chiswick Generals
- Cowley
- Ealing Celtic
- Feltham Sports
- Firestones
- Fourstores
- Great Western Railway reserves
- Hanwell
- Hanwell Athletic
- Hanwell Guild
- Harmondsworth St. Mary's
- Harrow & Greenhill
- Harrow Weald
- Hayesco
- Holland Athletic reserves
- Hounslow
- Hounslow Rangers
- Kensington Town
- Leavesden Mental Hospital
- Leyland Motors
- Lyons Club reserves
- Maidenhead Norfolkians
- Maidenhead United
- Marlow
- Minters Athletic
- Napier
- Newbury Town
- Paddington
- Park Royal reserves
- RAF Uxbridge
- Reading Amateurs
- Reading reserves
- Reading United
- Roxeth & Harrow Old Boys
- Royal Horse Guards
- Savoy Hotel
- Shepherd's Bush
- Slough
- Slough Trading Company
- Southall
- Southall United
- Staines
- Staines Lagonda
- Uxbridge
- Uxbridge Town
- Uxbridge Town reserves
- Uxbridge Unity
- Watford Old Boys
- Watford Old Boys reserves
- W.E.R.S.A.C
- Western United
- Willesden Town
- Windsor & Eton
- Windsor & Eton reserves
- Wycombe Wanderers
- Wycombe Wanderers reserves
- Yiewsley
- Yiewsley Juniors
