= 1897–98 Brentford F.C. season =

English football team season

Brentford
1897–98 season
- Chairman: Bill Stephenson
- Stadium: Shotter's Field
- London League First Division: 2nd
- FA Cup: Second qualifying round
- London Senior Cup: Winners
- Middlesex Senior Cup: Winners
- Top goalscorer: League: Field (11); All: Field (26)

During the 1897–98 English football season, Brentford competed in the London League First Division. A hugely successful season saw the Bees win the London Senior Cup, the Middlesex Senior Cup and finish as runners-up in the league.

== Season summary ==
After winning promotion from the London League Second Division at the first attempt, the Brentford committee bolstered the team's firepower for its first season in the First Division by signing forwards Thomas Knapman, John Richardson and Ernest Booth. Goalkeeper Jack Foster, then one of the club's highest appearance-makers, elected to retire from football and Arthur Charlton, one of the club's first great players, moved to Nottingham and was succeeded as captain by Herbert Edney – though Charlton would return to play for Brentford sporadically through the season.

Brentford obliterated all opposition throughout the season, with the goals of forward Oakey Field providing the firepower to help the club win the London Senior Cup and the Middlesex Senior Cup. The pileup of London League fixtures meant that the Bees had to close the season with seven matches in just over three weeks, which included two matches in one day on 16 April. Brentford went into the final day of the season knowing that a victory over strugglers Barking Woodville would seal the league title, but the best the jaded team could manage was a 0–0 draw, which allowed Thames Ironworks, who won their final match, to finish the season as champions.

== League table ==
Pos	Team	Pld	W	D	L	GF	GA	GR	Pts	Promotion
1	Thames Ironworks	16	12	3	1	47	15	3.133	27	Elected to the 1898–99 Southern League Second Division
2	Brentford	16	12	2	2	43	17	2.529	26	Elected to the 1898–99 Southern League Second Division
3	Leyton	16	8	4	4	41	33	1.242	20	Left league at end of season
4	3rd Grenadier Guards	16	7	3	6	34	33	1.030	17	Left league at end of season
5	Ilford	16	5	7	4	33	25	1.320	17	Left league at end of season
6	Stanley	16	5	4	7	22	22	1.000	14	Left league at end of season
7	Barking Woodville	16	2	6	8	16	37	0.432	10	Left league at end of season
8	Bromley	16	4	2	10	20	49	0.408	10	Transferred to Kent League at end of season
9	2nd Grenadier Guards	16	0	3	13	17	42	0.405	3	Left league at end of season

Source: 100 Years of Brentford

== Results ==
Brentford's goal tally listed first.

=== Legend ===
Win	Draw	Loss

=== London League First Division ===
No.	Date	Opponent	Venue	Result	Scorer(s)	Notes
1	11 September 1897	Thames Ironworks	A	0–1		
2	18 September 1897	2nd Grenadier Guards	H	4–2	Untraced, Dailley, Wade, Field	
3	9 October 1897	Ilford	A	2–2	Dailley, Field	
4	6 November 1897	Stanley	A	1–0	Booth	
5	4 December 1897	Barking Woodville	A	2–1	Untraced	
6	11 December 1897	Bromley	A	1–0	Booth	
7	8 January 1898	Leyton	H	8–4	Dailley, Field (6), Booth	
8	15 January 1898	3rd Grenadier Guards	A	5–1	Dailley, Field (3), Knapman	
9	10 March 1898	2nd Grenadier Guards	A	2–1	Wade (2)	(Note: Match played at Shotter's Field, Brentford.)
10	7 April 1898	Bromley	H	9–1	Untraced	
11	9 April 1898	Stanley	H	1–0	Knapman	
12	16 April 1898	Leyton	A	1–2	Knapman	
13	16 April 1898	Ilford	H	2–1	Fox, Butcher	
14	23 April 1898	Thames Ironworks	H	1–0	Lloyd	
15	27 April 1898	3rd Grenadier Guards	H	4–1	Booth (2), Richardson, Butcher	
16	30 April 1898	Barking Woodville	H	0–0		

=== FA Cup ===
Round	Date	Opponent	Venue	Result	Scorer(s)
1QR	25 September 1897	1st Coldstream Guards	H	6–1	Wade (3), Knapman, Field, untraced
2QR	16 October 1897	3rd Grenadier Guards	H	1–1	Swann (pen)
2QR (replay)	20 October 1897	3rd Grenadier Guards	A	1–4	Richardson

=== London Senior Cup ===
Round	Date	Opponent	Venue	Result	Scorer(s)	Notes
1R	22 January 1898	Stanley	H	4–2	Field (3), Dailley	
2R	19 February 1898	Clapton	H	4–1	Dailley, Earle (og), Field, Swann (pen)	
SF	12 March 1898	Casuals	N	4–3	Field (3), Knapman	(Note: Match played at Essex County Ground, Leyton.)
F	2 April 1898	Ilford	N	5–1	Lloyd (2), Field (2), Booth	

=== Middlesex Senior Cup ===
Round	Date	Opponent	Venue	Result	Scorer(s)	Notes
1R	29 January 1898	1st Scots Guards	H	4–2	Field (2), Booth, Knapman	
2R	26 February 1898	2nd Grenadier Guards	H	0–0		
2R (replay)	5 March 1898	2nd Grenadier Guards	H	3–1	Newman (2), Booth	
SF	19 March 1898	3rd Grenadier Guards	N	4–1	Field (2), Booth, Richardson	(Note: Match played at Gunnersbury Lane, Acton.)
F	28 April 1898	2nd Scots Guards	N	3–2 (a.e.t.)	Field, Charlton, Knapman	(Note: Match played at National Athletic Grounds, Kensal Rise.)

- Source: 100 Years of Brentford

== Playing squad ==
Note: Flags indicate national team as defined under FIFA eligibility rules; some limited exceptions apply. Players may hold more than one non-FIFA nationality.

Pos.	Nation	Player
GK	ENG	Charles Gillett
GK	ENG	Harry Pennington
DF		G. Collings
DF	ENG	Alfred Lugg
DF	ENG	J. Reed
DF	ENG	Percy Swann
DF	ENG	Archie Williams
DF	ENG	Harry Williams
MF	ENG	"A. Bee"
MF		Blunt
MF	SCO	Arthur Charlton
MF	ENG	Herbert Edney (c)
MF	ENG	W. Harrison
MF	ENG	George Haslen
MF	ENG	Alfred Mattocks
MF	ENG	"A. Newman"

Pos.	Nation	Player
MF	ENG	G. Pearce
MF	ENG	Billy Smith
MF	ENG	W. Walker
MF	ENG	Arthur Yeoman
FW	ENG	Ernest Booth
FW	ENG	Fred Butcher
FW	ENG	C. Fox
FW	ENG	Richard Dailley
FW	ENG	Oakey Field
FW	ENG	Harold Hudson
FW	ENG	Thomas Knapman
FW	ENG	David Lloyd
FW	ENG	John Richardson
FW	SCO	James Rough
FW	ENG	Billy Steers
FW		J. Wade

- "A. Bee" and "A. Newman" are aliases
- Source: 100 Years of Brentford

== Statistics ==
=== Management ===
Name	From	To	Record All Comps					Record League				
Name	From	To	P	W	D	L	W %	P	W	D	L	W %
Committee	11 September 1897	30 April 1898	28	21	4	3	75.00	16	12	2	2	75.00

=== Summary ===
Games played	28 (16 London League First Division, 3 FA Cup, 4 London Senior Cup, 5 Middlesex Senior Cup)
Games won	21 (12 London League First Division, 1 FA Cup, 4 London Senior Cup, 4 Middlesex Senior Cup)
Games drawn	4 (2 London League First Division, 1 FA Cup, 0 London Senior Cup, 1 Middlesex Senior Cup)
Games lost	3 (2 London League First Division, 1 FA Cup, 0 London Senior Cup, 0 Middlesex Senior Cup)
Goals scored	82 (43 London League First Division, 8 FA Cup, 17 London Senior Cup, 14 Middlesex Senior Cup)
Goals conceded	36 (17 London League First Division, 6 FA Cup, 7 London Senior Cup, 6 Middlesex Senior Cup)
Clean sheets	6 (5 London League First Division, 0 FA Cup, 0 London Senior Cup, 1 Middlesex Senior Cup)
Biggest league win	9–1 versus Bromley, 7 April 1898
Worst league defeat	1–0 versus Thames Ironworks, 11 September 1897; 2–1 versus Leyton, 16 April 1898
Most appearances (where traced)	25, Richard Dailley (13 London League First Division, 3 FA Cup, 4 London Senior Cup, 5 Middlesex Senior Cup)
Top scorer (league, where traced)	11, Oakey Field
Top scorer (all competitions, where traced)	26, Oakey Field
