= Clarence Park (St Albans) =

Football stadium and park in St Albans, England

- Interactive map of Clarence Park
- Full name: Clarence Park Stadium
- Address: York Road; St Albans, Hertfordshire; AL1 4PL
- Coordinates: 51°45′13″N 0°19′26″W
- Owner: St Albans City & District Council
- Operator: St Albans City F.C.
- Capacity: 5,007 (667 seated)
- Surface: Grass
- Record attendance: 9,757 v Ferryhill Athletic (27 February 1926, Amateur Cup 4th round)
- Public transit: St Albans City

Construction
- Built: 1893–1894
- Opened: 23 July 1894

Tenants
- St Albans (1894–1899); St Albans Amateurs (1899–1904); St Albans City (1908–present)

Clarence Park is an association football stadium and surrounding public park in St Albans, Hertfordshire, which serves as the home ground for Isthmian League Premier Division club St Albans City. The park is also home to a number of other sports facilities, including a cricket ground and bowls club.

== History ==
The park was laid out in early 1894, and comprises a 16-acre (65,000 m^{2}) municipal sports ground and a 9-acre (36,000 m^{2}) public park. Businessman John Blundell Maple, who lived at nearby Childwickbury Manor, donated the land and paid for the laying out, planting and construction of the buildings; the layout of the park itself was designed by city surveyor Mr G. Ford. A water fountain, which can still be seen today, was donated by Maple's wife.

The park was opened on 23 July 1894 by Prince George, Duke of Cambridge, being accompanied by celebrations across the city.

The public park includes large grass areas used for sun bathing and games during summer, a bandstand, a children's play-area and a café.

Clarence Park has also been used as a filming location for Disney Channel preschool series Bunnytown due to the city's proximity to Elstree Studios.

== Stadium ==
Clarence Park Stadium is the home of St Albans City Football Club and has been since their formation in 1908. It was used by St Albans F.C. and St Albans Amateurs prior to the formation of the club. The first football match at Clarence Park took place on 22 September 1894.

In the 1992–93 season, St Albans City finished as runners-up in the Isthmian League but were denied promotion due to a low ground grading as a result of a diseased oak tree within one of the terraces.

=== Relocation to Chiswell Green ===
In December 2025, the club announced plans to relocate to a new stadium at Noak Lane in Chiswell Green, on the outskirts of the city. This is due to limitations faced at Clarence Park, including inability to expand and ownership of the land. The move is expected to happen by 2030.

== Cricket ground ==
Clarence Park
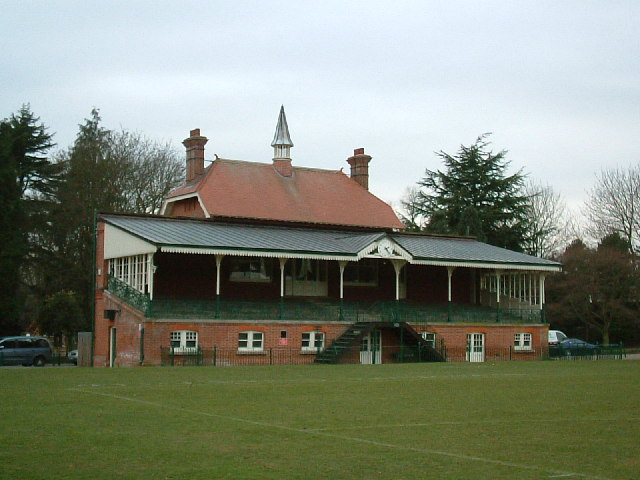
- Cricket pavilion at Clarence Park
- Interactive map of Clarence Park

Ground information
- Country: England

International information
- Only women's ODI: 23 June 1973: New Zealand v Trinidad and Tobago
- As of 6 September 2020; Source: CricketArchive

St Albans' cricket ground is also located in Clarence Park. The first recorded match played on the ground came in 1875, when Hertfordshire played Somerset. The first Minor Counties Championship match played on the ground came in 1895 when Hertfordshire played Bedfordshire. From 1895 to 1997, the ground hosted 84 Minor Counties Championship matches and 2 MCCA Knockout Trophy matches.

The cricket ground has played host to two List-A matches, the first of which came in the 1984 NatWest Trophy between Hertfordshire and Somerset. The second and final List-A match played on the ground came in the 1990 NatWest Trophy between Hertfordshire and Warwickshire.

The ground also hosted a single match in the 1973 Women's Cricket World Cup, which was contested between New Zealand and Trinidad and Tobago. In local domestic cricket, the ground is the home of St Albans Cricket Club who play in the Saracens Hertfordshire Cricket League Division 2A.

The cricket pavilion opened in 1894 and underwent a restoration of the external structure in 2023.
