= Harry Pennington (footballer) =

English footballer

Personal information
- Full name: Henry Pennington
- Date of birth: September 1873
- Place of birth: Farnworth, England
- Position: Goalkeeper

Senior career*
| Years | Team | Apps | (Gls) |
- 1st Scots Guards
| 1898 | Brentford | 12 | (0) |
| 1899 | Chorley | | |
| 1900–1904 | Notts County | 126 | (0) |
| 1905–1906 | Atherton Church House | | |
| 1906–1909 | Denaby United | | |
- * Club domestic league appearances and goals

Henry Pennington was an English professional footballer who played as a goalkeeper in the Football League for Notts County.

== Career statistics ==
Appearances and goals by club, season and competition
| Club | Season | League | | | FA Cup | | Other | | Total | |
| Club | Season | Division | Apps | Goals | Apps | Goals | Apps | Goals | Apps | Goals |
|---|---|---|---|---|---|---|---|---|---|---|
| Brentford | 1897–98 | London League First Division | 4 | 0 | — | | 2 (Note: Appearances in London Senior Cup) | 0 | 6 | 0 |
| Brentford | 1898–99 | Southern League Second Division | 8 | 0 | 1 | 0 | — | | 9 | 0 |
| Career total | | | 12 | 0 | 1 | 0 | 2 | 0 | 15 | 0 |

== Honours ==
Brentford

- London Senior Cup: 1897–98
