= Lindon Meikle =

English footballer (born 1988)

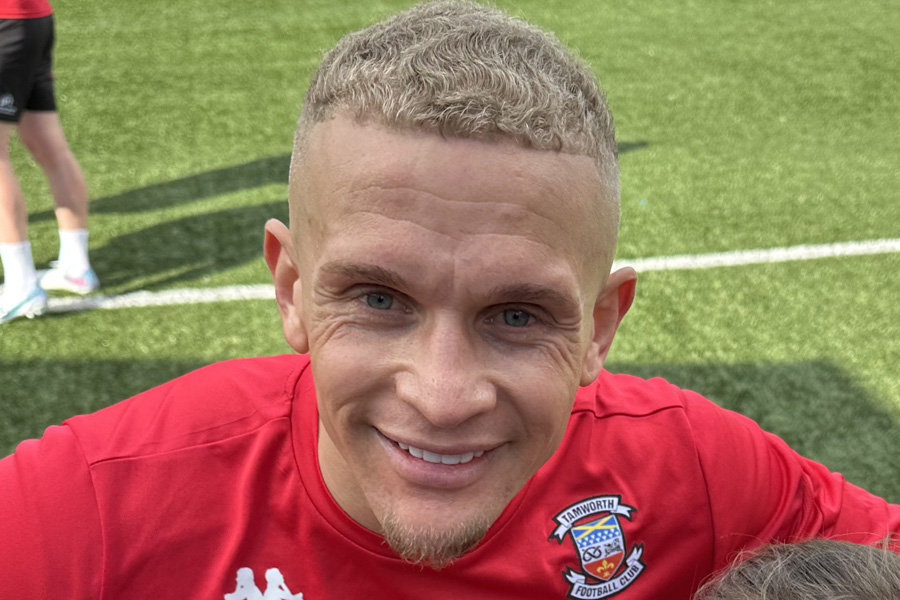
- Meikle in 2020

Personal information
- Full name: Lindon Levi Meikle
- Date of birth: 21 March 1988 (age 38)
- Place of birth: Nottingham, England
- Height: 5 ft 6 in (1.68 m)
- Positions: Winger; striker

Team information
- Current team: Rugby Borough

Youth career
- –2004: Eastwood Town

Senior career*
Years	Team	Apps	(Gls)
2004–2011	Eastwood Town (Note: The Eastwood Town appearances and goals only cover the 2009–10 and 2010–11 seasons.)	79	(21)
2011–2014	Mansfield Town	113	(12)
2014–2015	York City	28	(0)
2015	Macclesfield Town	6	(0)
2015–2016	Alfreton Town	23	(3)
2016–2017	Barrow	27	(0)
2017	→ Southport (loan)	4	(0)
2017–2020	Kettering Town	109	(14)
2020–2021	Tamworth	7	(0)
2021–2023	Buxton	56	(0)
2023	→ Tamworth (loan)	0	(0)
2023–2024	Tamworth	9	(0)
2024	→ Ilkeston Town (loan)	14	(1)
2024–2025	Ilkeston Town	36	(1)
2025	Barwell	7	(0)
2025–	Rugby Borough	0	(0)

International career^{‡}
2011–2013	England C	4	(0)
- * Club domestic league appearances and goals as of 19:40, 19 September 2025 (UTC) ‡ National team caps and goals as of 20:00, 21 February 2023 (UTC)

Lindon Levi Meikle (born 21 March 1988) is an English footballer who plays as a winger or striker for Northern Premier League Division One Midlands club Rugby Borough.

Meikle started his career with Vernon Colts before joining Eastwood Town's youth system, and made his first-team debut aged 16 in 2004. He helped Eastwood to promotion via the Northern Premier League First Division in 2007 and by winning the Northern Premier League Premier Division title in 2009. He played for them in the Conference North for two seasons before moving to Conference Premier club Mansfield Town in 2011, and helped them reach the play-offs in the 2011–12 season. Meikle was a member of the Mansfield team that won the Conference Premier title in 2013, and played for them for one season in League Two before joining divisional rivals York City.

== Club career ==
=== Eastwood Town ===
Meikle started his career with Vernon Colts before going on trial with Eastwood Town, after his father suggested he join his brother Deon at the club. He joined the club's youth system under Paul Cox. He graduated from the youth system and made his first-team debut as a 16-year-old during the 2004–05 season. Meikle helped Eastwood to promotion to the Northern Premier League Premier Division via the Northern Premier League First Division play-offs in 2006–07, and around this time had trials with Newcastle United, Nottingham Forest and Yeovil Town.

He established himself as a first-team regular under Cox in 2007–08 before helping Eastwood to the Northern Premier League Premier Division title, and so promotion to the Conference North, in 2008–09. During this season, Meikle scored with a 25-yard shot in Eastwood's 2–0 home win over Wycombe Wanderers in the second round of the 2011–12 FA Cup on 29 November 2008, which saw the club reach the third round for the first time in its history. He was named the FA Cup Player of the Round for his performance in this match.

Meikle scored 11 goals in 44 appearances in 2009–10 as Eastwood finished 10th in the Conference North. At the season's end, he was named the Supporters' Player of the Year, the chairman's Player of the Year and the Manager's Player of the Year. He helped Eastwood to a play-off position in 2010–11 with a fifth-place finish, although they were unable to play in them as their ground was not deemed good enough for the Conference Premier. He made 46 appearances and scored 11 goals in 2010–11.

=== Mansfield Town ===
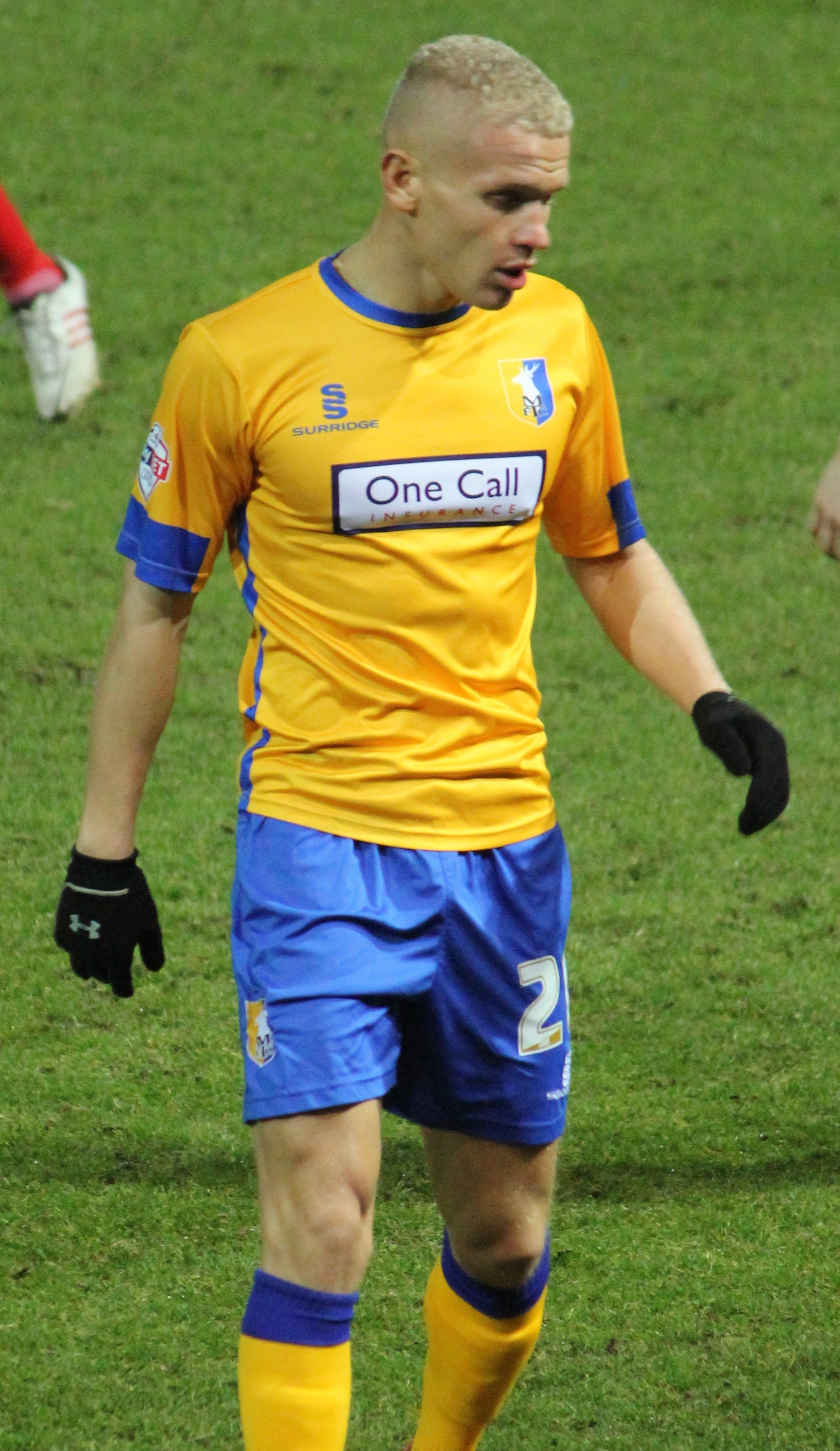
Meikle playing for Mansfield Town in 2013

Less than a week after Cox's appointment as manager of Mansfield Town, Meikle followed him to the Conference Premier club on 24 May 2011 after signing a one-year contract for an undisclosed fee. He made his debut as a 76th-minute substitute for Matt Green in a 1–1 home draw with Bath City on 13 August 2011. His first goal for the club was the 81st-minute winner in a 3–1 away win over Barrow, which came after he paced past two defenders before he calmly finished with a shot into the bottom corner. Meikle played a vital role in Mansfield reaching the play-offs in third place, playing in both semi-final matches against York City, which the team lost 2–1 on aggregate. He finished 2011–12 with 7 goals in 47 appearances and was offered a new contract by the club in May 2012.

Meikle made 50 appearances and scored 4 goals in 2012–13 as Mansfield won the Conference Premier title, and therefore promotion to League Two. He was handed a new contract with the club in May 2013. Meikle played in Mansfield's first Football League match for five years, entering the 2–0 away defeat to Scunthorpe United on 3 August 2013 as a 51st-minute substitute for Lee Stevenson. His first goal at this level was the equaliser in a 2–2 home draw with Portsmouth on 24 August 2013, with a close range finish in the 72nd minute. Meikle scored once in 32 appearances in 2013–14 as Mansfield finished 11th, although he was mostly used as a substitute as the formation employed by Mansfield did not include wingers.

=== York City ===
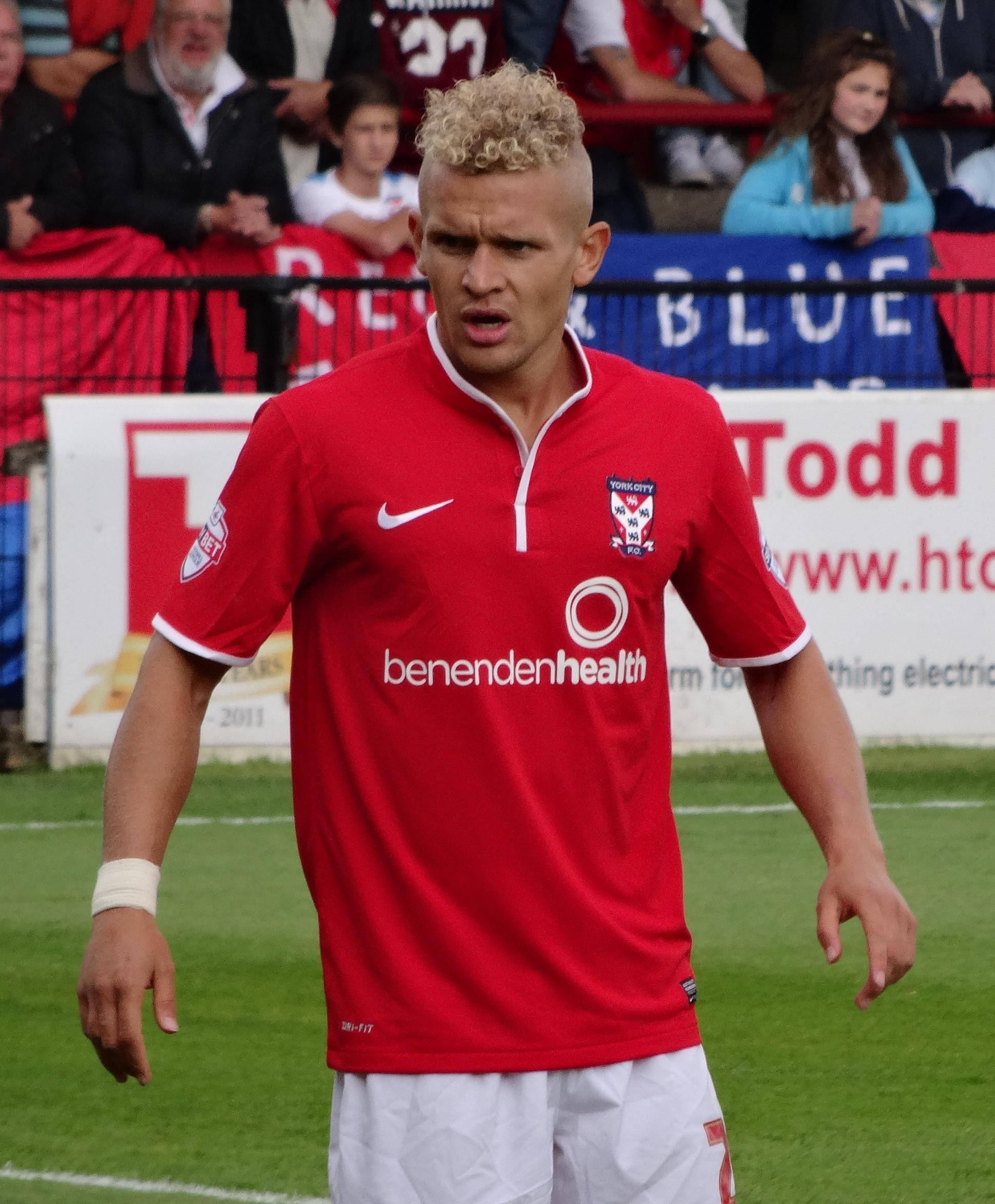
Meikle playing for York City in 2014

Meikle turned down a new contract with Mansfield to sign for their League Two rivals York City on 1 July 2014 on a two-year contract. He made his debut in York's 1–1 away draw with Tranmere Rovers in the opening match of 2014–15 on 9 August 2014. Meikle's season was described by The Press as "miserable", and his chances in the team were limited towards the end of the season. He made 32 appearances as York finished 18th in League Two, and was transfer listed by manager Russ Wilcox in May 2015. Having failed to make a matchday squad in the opening first five matches of 2015–16, he was released by York by mutual consent on 24 August 2015.

=== Macclesfield Town ===
Meikle signed for National League club Macclesfield Town on 25 September 2015 on non-contract terms, and made his debut a day later as a 67th-minute substitute for Danny Rowe in a 3–0 away win over Aldershot Town. He was released by Macclesfield in November 2015 after making seven appearances for the club, and was denied a move to Barrow by the Football Association as he could not join a third club at that stage of the season.

=== Alfreton Town ===
Meikle joined Alfreton Town of the National League North on 3 December 2015, making his debut two days later when starting their 1–0 away defeat to Lowestoft Town. He scored his first goal with a 12-yard curling shot in the 69th minute of a 2–1 away win over Tamworth on 26 December 2015. On 6 January 2016, Meikle signed a new contract with Alfreton to the end of the season, having initially joined on a one-month non-contract basis. He made 23 appearances and scored 3 goals as Alfreton finished 10th in the National League North in 2015–16.

=== Barrow ===
Meikle joined National League club Barrow on 26 May 2016, being reunited with Cox for the second time. He signed a one-year contract, with the option of a second year based on appearances.

On 16 February 2017, Meikle joined Barrow's National League rivals Southport on loan until the end of 2016–17. He made his debut two days later, starting in a 0–0 draw away to Woking. He was recalled by Barrow on 16 March 2017 to cover for players missing through injury and suspension, having made four appearances for Southport. He was released at the end of the season.

=== Kettering Town ===
On 15 July 2017, Meikle signed for Southern League Premier Division club Kettering Town. Lindon made his debut for Kettering Town on 15 August 2017 in a Southern League Premier Division Central fixture at home to Redditch United, with Meikle making an instant impression scoring the matchwinner in a 1–0 victory, with a minute of injury time remaining, and receiving the man of the match award. he helped Kettering Town to a 4th-place finish during the 2017–18 season, eventually losing to Slough Town in the play-offs. He made 44 league appearances and scored four goals.

=== Tamworth ===
Meikle signed for Southern League Premier Division Central side Tamworth on 15 July 2020. Lindon made his debut for Tamworth on 19 September 2020, as the club drew 1–1 away at Peterborough Sports on the opening day of the season.

=== Buxton ===
Ahead of the 2021-22 season, Meikle signed for Northern Premier League side Buxton.

=== Tamworth (loan) ===
On 21 February 2023, Meikle re-joined Southern League Premier Division Central side Tamworth on loan until the end of the season.

== International career ==
Meikle made his debut for the England national C team in a 3–1 away defeat to Gibraltar in a friendly on 11 November 2011. He earned four caps for England C from 2011 to 2012. He qualifies for Jamaica through his father.

== Style of play ==
Meikle primarily plays as a winger and can also play as a striker. He is known for his high workrate, on which Cox commented that "He works so hard and is full of energy". When signing for York in 2014 manager Nigel Worthington commented that he has "pace and that directness to get at defenders".

== Personal life ==
Born in Nottingham, Nottinghamshire, Meikle is from the Hyson Green area of the city and attended Djanogly City Academy. He worked in a clothes shop while playing semi-professionally for Eastwood, but left this role after turning professional when joining Mansfield in 2011.

== Career statistics ==
As of end of 9 September 2025

Appearances and goals by club, season and competition
Club	Season	League			FA Cup		League Cup		Other		Total	
Club	Season	Division	Apps	Goals	Apps	Goals	Apps	Goals	Apps	Goals	Apps	Goals
Eastwood Town	2009–10	Conference North	40	11	3	0	—		1 (Note: Appearance(s) in FA Trophy)	0	44	11
Eastwood Town	2010–11	Conference North	39	10	5	1	—		2	0	46	11
Eastwood Town	Total		79	21	8	1	—		3	0	90	22
Mansfield Town	2011–12	Conference Premier	42	7	2	0	—		3 (Note: One appearance in FA Trophy, two in Conference Premier play-offs)	0	47	7
Mansfield Town	2012–13	Conference Premier	43	4	6	0	—		1	0	50	4
Mansfield Town	2013–14	League Two	28	1	3	0	1	0	0	0	32	1
Mansfield Town	Total		113	12	11	0	1	0	4	0	129	12
York City	2014–15	League Two	28	0	2	0	1	0	1 (Note: Appearance in Football League Trophy)	0	32	0
York City	2015–16	League Two	0	0	—		0	0	—		0	0
York City	Total		28	0	2	0	1	0	1	0	32	0
Macclesfield Town	2015–16	National League	6	0	1	0	—		—		7	0
Alfreton Town	2015–16	National League North	23	3	—		—		—		23	3
Barrow	2016–17	National League	27	0	1	0	—		2	1	30	1
Southport (loan)	2016–17	National League	4	0	—		—		—		4	0
Kettering Town	2017–18	Southern League Premier Division	44	4	4	1	—		8 (Note: One appearance in Northamptonshire Cup, two in Southern League Cup, one in FA Trophy, three in Northamptonshire Senior Cup, one in Southern League Premier Division play-offs)	0	56	5
Kettering Town	2018–19	Southern League Premier Division Central	39	8	3	0	—		7 (Note: One appearance in Northamptonshire Cup, one in Northamptonshire Senior Cup, three in Southern League Cup, two in FA Trophy)	0	49	8
Kettering Town	2019–20	National League North	26	2	0	0	—		1 (Note: One appearance in FA Trophy)	0	27	2
Kettering Town	Total		109	14	7	1	—		16	0	132	15
Tamworth	2020–21	Southern League Premier Division Central	7	0	3	0	—		1	0	11	0
Buxton	2021–22	Northern Premier League	36	0	8	0	—		1	0	45	0
Buxton	2022–23	National League North	20	0	2	0	—		1	0	45	0
Tamworth (loan)	2022–23	Southern League Premier Division Central	9	0	0	0	—		0	0	9	0
Tamworth	2023–24	National League North	9	0	2	0	—		0	0	11	0
Ilkeston Town (loan)	2023–24	Northern Premier League Premier Division	14	1	0	0	—		0	0	14	1
Ilkeston Town	2024–25	Northern Premier League Premier Division	36	1	2	0	—		3 (Note: One appearance in FA Trophy, two appearances in Derbyshire Senior Cup)	0	41	1
Ilkeston Town	Total		50	2	2	0	0	0	3	0	55	2
Barwell	2025–26	Southern League Premier Division Central	7	0	1	0	—		0	0	8	0
Rugby Borough	2025–26	Northern Premier League Division One Midlands	—		—		—		—		—	
Career total			518	52	48	2	2	0	32	1	598	55

== Honours ==
Eastwood Town

- Northern Premier League First Division play-offs: 2007
- Northern Premier League Premier Division: 2008–09

Mansfield Town

- Conference Premier: 2012–13

Kettering Town

- Northamptonshire Cup: 2017–18; runner-up: 2018–19
- Northamptonshire Senior Cup: 2017–18
- Southern League Premier Division Central: 2018–19

Tamworth

- National League North: 2023–24

Individual

- Eastwood Town Player of the Year: 2009–10
