= David Lloyd (footballer, born 1872) =

English footballer

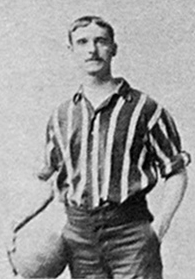
- Lloyd while with Brentford in 1898

Personal information
- Date of birth: June 1872
- Place of birth: Hackney, London
- Date of death: Unknown
- Height: 6 ft 4 in (1.93 m)
- Position: Forward

Senior career*
| Years | Team | Apps | (Gls) |
| 1896–1897 | 3rd Grenadier Guards | | |
| 1898 | Brentford | 6 | (1) |
| 1898–1899 | Thames Ironworks | 11 | (12) |
| 1899–1901 | Fulham | | |
| 1902–1904 | Fulham | | |
| 1904–1905 | Willesden | | |
- * Club domestic league appearances and goals

David Lloyd (born June 1872) was an English footballer who played for Brentford, Thames Ironworks, the club that went on to become West Ham United, Fulham and Willesden.

Lloyd was a career soldier in Third Grenadier Guards and played for the Third Grenadier Guards football team winning the first of his four footballing medals in the 1896–97 season when the Guards won the London League championship. Described as "dominant in the air in any position", he scored frequently with his head. In his second season as a player, he joined Brentford and won the London Senior Cup, scoring twice in the 5–1 final victory over Ilford.

He played for Thames Ironworks during the 1898–99 season, the club's only season in the Southern League Division Two. This season the management committee for the club agreed to accept professionalism within the club believing professional players would attract a larger crowd and greater revenue. Lloyd was such a player joining 18 new players for the season, the majority of whom were professionals, signed against the anti-professionalism stance of the club's benefactor, Arnold Hills who was preoccupied in dealing with the aftermath of the HMS Albion launching disaster. Lloyd played the first two League games as a full-back, but soon moved into attack and scored a hat-trick on his debut as a centre-forward, against St Albans. Thames Ironworks won the Southern League Division Two, giving Lloyd his third medal. A prolific goal-scorer, he scored six goals in 11 appearances in the Thames and Medway Combination, and 14 goals in 13 appearances in the Southern League, including the Irons' goal in the test match against Sheppey United at the end of the season. In the end, that result didn't matter as Division One was enlarged for the 1899–1900 season. He ended the 1898-99 season as top scorer for Thames Ironworks, but moved on before the new season.

Lloyd joined Fulham in 1899 and in two seasons scored 24 goals in 43 matches. He was their top scorer for the 1899–1900 season. He managed to fill most positions during his time at the club, even once playing in goal, against Maidenhead in April 1901.

Following the outbreak of the Boer War, Lloyd returned to the army in 1900 and saw active service in South Africa. He returned to Fulham for the 1902–03 season and played as a defender. In November 1902, Lloyd was suspended for 28 days after punching Jimmy Murray during the club's FA Cup game against Watford. He managed 12 goals in 31 appearances in his first season and he again won the Southern League Division Two, his fourth medal. The following season Fulham filled their side with fully professional players. Lloyd continued to play but made just three FA Cup appearances, scoring two goals. In August 1904 he signed for amateur club, Willesden.

== Honours ==
Brentford

- London Senior Cup: 1897–98
