= Arthur Charlton =

English footballer

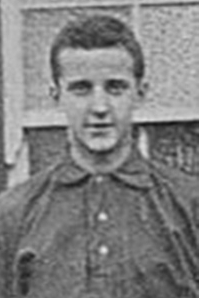
- Charlton while with Brentford in 1894.

Personal information
- Full name: Arthur Herbert Charlton
- Date of birth: 29 December 1876
- Place of birth: Paisley, Scotland
- Date of death: 24 October 1956 (aged 79)
- Place of death: Ealing, England
- Position: Half back

Senior career*
Years	Team	Apps	(Gls)
1892–1898	Brentford	19	(1)
1898	Nottingham Forest	3	(0)
- * Club domestic league appearances and goals

Arthur Herbert Charlton (29 December 1876 – 24 October 1956) was a Scottish amateur footballer who played as a half back in the Football League for Nottingham Forest. He is best remembered for his six years in amateur football with Brentford during the 1890s, captaining the team and being described as "probably the club's first great player". He was posthumously inducted into the Brentford Hall of Fame in 2015.

== Personal life ==
Charlton left Brentford to complete an apprenticeship in soap making. He later returned to West London served as head of the Brentford Chamber of Commerce from 1932 to 1933 and as mayor of the Municipal Borough of Brentford and Chiswick in 1951. He was also a county councillor, an alderman and chairman and managing director of the Brentford Soap Company. He was made a freeman of the borough in 1954.

== Career statistics ==
Appearances and goals by club, season and competition
Club	Season	League			FA Cup		Other		Total	
Club	Season	Division	Apps	Goals	Apps	Goals	Apps	Goals	Apps	Goals
Brentford	1896–97	London League Second Division	7	1	—		9 (Note: 5 appearances and 4 goals in London Senior Cup, 2 appearances and 1 goal in Middlesex Senior Cup, 2 appearances and 1 goal in West Middlesex Cup)	6	16	7
Brentford	1897–98	London League First Division	9	0	2	0	10 (Note: 6 appearances and 1 goal in Middlesex Senior Cup, 4 appearances in London Senior Cup)	1	21	1
Brentford	1898–99	Southern League Second Division	3	0	—		0	0	3	0
Brentford	Total		19	1	2	0	19	7	40	8
Nottingham Forest	1898–99	First Division	3	0	0	0	—		3	0
Career total			22	1	2	0	19	7	43	8

== Honours ==
Brentford

- West London Alliance: 1892–93
- West Middlesex Cup: 1894–95
- London League Second Division second-place promotion: 1896–97
- London League First Division second-place promotion: 1897–98
- London Senior Cup: 1897–98
- Middlesex Senior Cup: 1897–98

Individual

- Brentford Hall of Fame
