= Frederick Johnson (footballer) =

English footballer

Personal information
- Full name: Frederick Johnson
- Date of birth: 1876
- Place of birth: Staffordshire, England
- Positions: Right half; inside right

Senior career*
Years	Team	Apps	(Gls)
1898–1899	Brentford	11	(7)
1899–1902	Gainsborough Trinity	81	(4)
- * Club domestic league appearances and goals

Frederick Johnson was an English professional footballer who played in the Football League for Gainsborough Trinity as a right half.

== Career statistics ==
Appearances and goals by club, season and competition
Club	Season	League			FA Cup		Other		Total	
Club	Season	Division	Apps	Goals	Apps	Goals	Apps	Goals	Apps	Goals
Brentford	1898–99	Southern League Second Division	11	7	—		4 (Note: 2 appearances and 2 goals in West Middlesex Cup, 2 appearances and 1 goal in Middlesex Senior Cup)	3	15	10
Career total			11	7	0	0	4	3	15	10
