= Roger Ford (cricketer) =

New Zealand cricketer (born 1965)

Personal information
- Born: 29 November 1965 (age 60); Leeston, New Zealand
- Source: Cricinfo, 15 October 2020

Roger Ford (born 29 November 1965) is a New Zealand former cricketer. He played in 33 first-class and 11 List A matches for Canterbury from 1988 to 1994. He also played for St Albans Cricket Club.

== See also ==
- List of Canterbury representative cricketers
