= 1896–97 Brentford F.C. season =

English football team season

Brentford
1896–97 season
- Chairman: Bill Stephenson
- Stadium: Shotter's Field
- London League Second Division: 2nd (promoted)
- London Senior Cup: Semi-final
- Middlesex Senior Cup: Second qualifying round
- West Middlesex Cup: Runners-up
- Top goalscorer: League: Field (8); All: Field (15)

During the 1896–97 English football season, Brentford competed in the London League Second Division. The club finished as runners-up to gain promotion to the First Division.

== Season summary ==
The goals of Oakey Field fired Brentford to promotion at the end of the season.

During the 1896 off-season, Brentford was elected into the Second Division of the newly-formed London League. 1896–97 marked the club's first full season of competitive league play since 1892–93, when it finished as champions of the West London Alliance. Long-serving half back Jimmy Ray and outside left Tommy Stevenson were released and transferred in were forwards Oakey Field, Harold Hudson, J. Wade and left half Billy Smith.

Despite a failure to win either the London Senior Cup, Middlesex Senior Cup or the West Middlesex Cup, Brentford took the London League Second Division by storm, losing just one match all season to finish as runners-up to champions Bromley and gain promotion to the First Division. Attendances at Shotter's Field were rarely below 1,500 and forward Oakey Field and captain Arthur Charlton scored many of the team's goals.

== League table ==
Pos	Team	Pld	W	D	L	GF	GA	GR	Pts	Promotion
1	Bromley	16	11	3	2	42	16	2.625	25	Promoted to the 1897–98 London League First Division
2	Brentford	16	9	6	1	42	19	2.211	24	Promoted to the 1897–98 London League First Division
3	Queens Park Rangers	16	10	1	5	31	14	2.214	21	Promoted to the 1897–98 London League First Division
4	Stanley	16	7	6	3	22	10	2.200	20	Promoted to the 1897–98 London League First Division
5	Hammersmith Athletic	16	5	3	8	18	25	0.720	13	
6	Harrow Athletic	16	4	3	9	19	34	0.559	11	
7	Forest Swifts	16	3	4	9	25	37	0.676	10	
8	Fulham	16	3	4	9	17	40	0.425	10	
9	West Croydon	16	3	4	9	12	33	0.364	10	

Source: 100 Years of Brentford

== Results ==
Brentford's goal tally listed first.

=== Legend ===
Win	Draw	Loss

=== London League Second Division ===
No.	Date	Opponent	Venue	Result	Scorer(s)
1	3 October 1896	Fulham	H	6–1	Wade, Field (3), H. Williams, Hester
2	21 November 1896	Fulham	A	2–0	Steers, Ingram
3	5 December 1896	Bromley	A	2–2	A. Williams, Swann (pen)
4	12 December 1896	West Croydon	A	2–2	Hudson, Bailey
5	20 February 1897	Bromley	H	3–2	Untraced, Hudson, Swann (pen)
6	6 March 1897	Harrow Athletic	A	2–2	Field, Ingram
7	18 March 1897	West Croydon	H	4–0	Untraced
8	24 March 1897	Stanley	A	2–1	Field (2)
9	27 March 1897	Forest Swifts	A	1–1	Field
10	31 March 1897	Hammersmith Athletic	A	3–0	Untraced
11	1 April 1897	Forest Swifts	H	3–2	Untraced
12	3 April 1897	Harrow Athletic	H	5–0	Hudson, Wade (2), Charlton (2)
13	10 April 1897	Queens Park Rangers	H	2–2	Field, Hudson
14	16 April 1897	Hammersmith Athletic	H	4–1	Untraced
15	17 April 1897	Stanley	H	0–0	
16	22 April 1897	Queens Park Rangers	A	1–3	Untraced

=== London Senior Cup ===
Round	Date	Opponent	Venue	Result	Scorer(s)	Notes
1QR	17 October 1896	Novocastrians	H	3–1	Hudson, Charlton, Field	
2QR	7 November 1896	Harrow Athletic	A	3–0	Hudson, Charlton, Field	
3QR	28 November 1896	Crescent	H	5–1	Charlton (2), Hester (2), Bailey	
4QR	19 December 1896	Old St. Mark's	H	2–1	Charlton, Swann (pen)	
1R	6 February 1897	Old Foresters	H	4–2	Bailey (2), Hudson, H. Williams	
2R	27 February 1897	Bromley	H	3–1	Butcher, Batchelor, Swann (pen)	
SF	8 April 1897	Old Carthusians	N	1–5	Field	(Note: Match played at Essex County Ground, Leyton.)

=== Middlesex Senior Cup ===
Round	Date	Opponent	Venue	Result	Scorer(s)
1QR	10 October 1896	Bow	H	8–0	A. Williams, untraced, (Note: Goal was described thus; "forced into goal by several Bs". Middlesex Independent, p. 4, 14 October 1896) Field (2), untraced (2 og), (Note: First own goal was described thus; "one of the Bows backs tried to head it away but failed, the ball passing into the net", second own goal; "the back in trying to relieve, mis-kicked and permitted the ball to roll into his own goal". Middlesex Independent, p. 4, 14 October 1896) Charlton, Hester
2QR	14 November 1896	Royal Scots Greys	A	0–1	

=== West Middlesex Cup ===
Round	Date	Opponent	Venue	Result	Scorer(s)	Notes
1R	13 February 1897	Southall	A	3–1	Charlton, Wade (2)	
SF	13 March 1897	Harrow Athletic	N	5–2	Hudson, Field (2), Salt (og), untraced	(Note: Match played at unknown venue, Hanwell.)
F	24 April 1897	Hanwell	N	0–1		(Note: Match played at White Hart Field, Southall.)

- Source: 100 Years of Brentford

== Playing squad ==
Note: Flags indicate national team as defined under FIFA eligibility rules; some limited exceptions apply. Players may hold more than one non-FIFA nationality.

Pos.	Nation	Player
GK	ENG	Jack Foster
DF	ENG	A. Collins
DF	ENG	Alfred Lugg
DF		Shields
DF	ENG	Percy Swann
DF	ENG	Archie Williams
MF	SCO	Arthur Charlton (c)
MF	ENG	Richard Dailley
MF	ENG	Herbert Edney
MF	ENG	E. Osbourne
MF	ENG	Arthur Pring
MF	ENG	Billy Smith
FW		A. Adams

Pos.	Nation	Player
FW	ENG	G. Bailey
FW		Batchelor
FW	ENG	Fred Butcher
FW	ENG	Oakey Field
FW	ENG	George Hester
FW	ENG	Harold Hudson
FW	ENG	L. Ingram
FW	ENG	Hilton Saunders
FW	ENG	Billy Steers
FW		J. Wade
FW	MLT	George Whitmarsh
FW	ENG	Harry Williams

- Player of unknown position: Batchelor
- Source: 100 Years of Brentford

== Statistics ==
=== Management ===
Name	From	To	Record All Comps					Record League				
Name	From	To	P	W	D	L	W %	P	W	D	L	W %
Committee	3 October 1896	24 April 1897	28	18	6	4	64.29	16	9	6	1	56.25

=== Summary ===
Games played	28 (16 London League Second Division, 7 London Senior Cup, 2 Middlesex Senior Cup, 3 West Middlesex Cup)
Games won	18 (9 London League Second Division, 6 London Senior Cup, 1 Middlesex Senior Cup, 2 West Middlesex Cup)
Games drawn	6 (6 London League Second Division, 0 London Senior Cup, 0 Middlesex Senior Cup, 0 West Middlesex Cup)
Games lost	4 (1 London League Second Division, 1 London Senior Cup, 1 Middlesex Senior Cup, 1 West Middlesex Cup)
Goals scored	74 (42 London League Second Division, 21 London Senior Cup, 8 Middlesex Senior Cup, 3 West Middlesex Cup)
Goals conceded	39 (19 London League Second Division, 11 London Senior Cup, 1 Middlesex Senior Cup, 8 West Middlesex Cup)
Clean sheets	7 (5 London League Second Division, 1 London Senior Cup, 1 Middlesex Senior Cup, 0 West Middlesex Cup)
Biggest league win	5–0 versus Harrow Athletic, 3 April 1897; 6–1 versus Fulham, 3 October 1896
Worst league defeat	3–1 versus Queens Park Rangers, 22 April 1897
Most appearances (where traced)	17, Arthur Charlton, Richard Dailley, Jack Foster (7 London League Second Division, 6 London Senior Cup, 2 Middlesex Senior Cup, 2 West Middlesex Cup)
Top scorer (league, where traced)	8, Oakey Field
Top scorer (all competitions, where traced)	15, Oakey Field
