= George Pollitt =

English cricketer (1874–1942)

George Pollitt (3 June 1874–1942) was an English first-class cricketer, who played one match for Yorkshire County Cricket Club in 1899. Unusually for a 'one match wonder' he was highly successful in his only innings, scoring 51 against Hampshire in a drawn match at Park Avenue, Bradford. He took a catch but did not bowl. He also played for the Yorkshire Second XI during that year, and for Bedfordshire from 1904 to 1906. He also played football and made one Southern League appearance as a right back for Brentford in 1899.

Pollitt was born in Chickenley, Dewsbury, Yorkshire, England and died during 1942 in Blackpool Lancashire.
