= Will Richards (footballer) =

Welsh footballer (born 1991)

Personal information
- Full name: William Stanley Richards
- Date of birth: 18 December 1991 (age 34)
- Place of birth: Knighton, Wales
- Position: Defender

Team information
- Current team: Barry Town United

Youth career
- –2009: Shrewsbury Town

Senior career*
Years	Team	Apps	(Gls)
2009−2010	Shrewsbury Town	0	(0)
2010−2011	AFC Telford United		
2010−2011	→ Market Drayton Town (loan)		
2011	→ Redditch United (loan)		
2011−2012	Solihull Moors		
2011	→ Redditch United (loan)		
2011−2012	→ Evesham United (loan)		
2012−2013	Redditch United		
2013−2015	Stourbridge		
2015−2016	Redditch United		
2016−2023	Chippenham Town	118	(10)
2023–2024	Gloucester City	2	(0)
2024	Barry Town United	0	(0)
- * Club domestic league appearances and goals as of 18:00, 30 June 2019 (UTC)

William Stanley Richards (born 18 December 1991) is a Welsh footballer who plays as a defender for Barry Town United.

A product of the Shrewsbury Town youth system, he made just one senior appearance, before embarking on a career in non-league football in the West Midlands area.

== Playing career ==
Richards began his career in the Shrewsbury Town youth team, and despite ultimately never signing professional terms with the club made one competitive appearance in a Football League Trophy fixture against Accrington Stanley on 20 October 2009 as a substitute.

Having also been a regular for Shrewsbury's reserve team, on his release he was offered a trial and later signed up at non-league neighbours AFC Telford in June 2010, however he was sent out on loan to Market Drayton Town in September 2010 with then Telford manager Andy Sinton citing his sides good start to the season limiting Richards first team opportunities at the club. He was recalled from his loan to cover for suspension in January 2011 but was sent out on loan again to Redditch United in February 2011.

After the expiry of his contract at Telford, Richards later went on to sign for Solihull Moors in August 2011, before spending further loan spells at Redditch and Evesham United. He then spent the 2012−13 season on a permanent basis at Redditch United, before joining Stourbridge in June 2013. Whilst at Stourbridge, he notably scored in an FA Cup first-round tie against fellow Southern League Premier Division side Biggleswade Town in a 4−1 victory. He also played a full ninety minutes in the second round as they were knocked out of the competition by Stevenage of League One.

Richards returned to Redditch for a fourth time, signing a one-year deal in June 2015.

After being named in the Southern Football League team of the year for the 2015–16 season, he then signed for Chippenham Town in July 2016, helping them to promotion to the National League South as champions of the Southern League Premier Division in April 2017. He agreed a contract extension at the club the following month.

Will departed Chippenham Town after 4 seasons on 20 December 2019, and emigrated to Australia.

In December 2023, Richards joined National League North club Gloucester City. He departed the club on 10 January 2024, joining Cymru Premier club Barry Town United two days later.
