= St Albans Cricket Club =

St Albans Cricket Club was a cricket club in New Zealand. A St Albans Cricket Club had been created by 1872. A district club was created in 1905 to play district cricket, and played in Canterbury Cricket Association games.

The club won the Senior Championship in, in particular, the 1910–1911 season, the 1925–1926 season, the 1949–1950 season, the 1954–1955 season, the 1956–1957 season, the 1963–1964 season, and the 1964–1965 season. The club won the Senior Championship, now called the Trust Bank Trophy, in, in particular, the 1986–1987 season, the 1987–1988 season, and the 1988–1989 season.

The club had clubrooms at the Hagley Oval.

The club was sponsored by Kinetic Investments from 1988 and Imperial Cut Price Liquor Store in 1989.

The men's club merged with the women's club in 1977. St Albans won the senior grade women's championship during the 1938–1939 season and the 1939–1940 season, and the Christmas women's competition in 1985.

== Players ==
The following have played for St Albans in the past:

- C. W. Allard.
- Dr Arthur B. O'Brien
- Cyril Crawford
- Ernest Crawshaw
- Roger Ford
- Keith Ollivier
- Tom Reese
- Don Sandman
