= Anthony Howell (footballer) =

English footballer

Personal information
- Full name: Anthony Nikille Richard Howell
- Date of birth: 27 May 1986 (age 40)
- Place of birth: Nottingham, England
- Position: Midfielder

Team information
- Current team: Alfreton Town
- Number: 11

Senior career*
Years	Team	Apps	(Gls)
2007	Hucknall Town		
2008	Eastwood Town		
2008–2009	Ilkeston Town		
2009	Mansfield Town	2	(0)
2009	→ Alfreton Town (loan)		
2009–2011	Alfreton Town		
2011–2014	Mansfield Town	102	(12)
2014–	Alfreton Town	6	(0)
- * Club domestic league appearances and goals as of 01:45 16 September 2014 (UTC)

Anthony Nikille Richard Howell (born 27 May 1986) is an English professional footballer best known for his time with Mansfield Town FC. His playing position is primarily as a central midfielder, although he can play as a striker or winger. Howell has acted as an emergency goalkeeper for Alfreton.

== Career ==
After various spells at non-league clubs (including a short spell at Mansfield), Howell signed for Alfreton, where he spent two and a half years, helping the team to promotion to the Conference Premier in 2011.

He rejected a new contract at Alfreton to sign for Mansfield in June 2011. Howell helped Mansfield to the 2012–13 Conference title, thus promotion to the Football League. He was rewarded for this with a new contract.

Howell played a big part in the third round of the FA cup match against Liverpool F.C, at the One Call Stadium on Sunday 6 January 2013. Howell's big moments in the game were his well saved shot by Brad Jones and his crunching tackle on Liverpool's goal scorer Luis Suárez.

Howell re-signed for Alfreton Town on a one-year contract on 29 July 2014.

On 28 October 2014 in an FA Cup replay against Lincoln City, Howell played in goal. This was due to injuries and Alfreton being unable to register a player who was not registered for the original game. Alfreton lost the match 5–1.
