= Ross Dyer (footballer) =

English footballer

Personal information
- Full name: Ross David Dyer
- Date of birth: 12 May 1988 (age 38)
- Place of birth: Stafford, England
- Height: 6 ft 2 in (1.88 m)
- Position: Forward

Senior career*
Years	Team	Apps	(Gls)
200?–2010	Hednesford Town		
2010–2011	Forest Green Rovers	31	(5)
2011–2014	Mansfield Town	58	(10)
2013	→ Hereford United (loan)	5	(3)
2014–2015	FC Halifax Town	13	(1)
2014	→ Southport (loan)	6	(0)
2015	→ AFC Telford United (loan)	14	(0)
2015–2017	Tamworth	77	(17)
- * Club domestic league appearances and goals as of 00:00, 29 January 2018 (UTC)

Ross David Dyer (born 12 May 1988) is an English semi-professional footballer who last played for Conference North side Tamworth, where he played as a striker.

He can name Mansfield Town, Hednesford Town, Forest Green Rovers and FC Halifax Town among his previous clubs.

== Playing career ==
=== Hednesford Town ===
Dyer began his career with Hednesford Town, where after coming through the youth system, he eventually progressed to become the club's first team captain.

=== Forest Green Rovers ===
He joined Forest Green Rovers in May 2010 on a one-year deal. However he suffered an ankle injury in September 2010 that ruled him out temporarily. He scored five goals in 32 games in the 2010–11 season for Forest Green.

=== Mansfield Town ===
Dyer then joined Mansfield Town in August 2011, with his £6,000 compensation fee being paid by Mansfield Town's fundraising group the 12th Stag. He scored nine goals in 47 appearances in the 2011–12 season.

He was limited to one appearance in the 2012–13 campaign after picking up a cruciate knee ligament injury, as the "Stags" won promotion to the Football League as champions of the Conference Premier. He made his Football League debut on 3 August 2013, starting in a 2–0 defeat to Scunthorpe United.

=== Hereford United (loan) ===
On 11 October 2013, he joined Hereford United on a one-month loan deal. After three seasons with Mansfield he was released at the end of the 2013–14 season.

=== FC Halifax Town ===
On 27 June 2014, it was announced that Dyer had signed for Conference Premier FC Halifax Town.

=== Tamworth ===
On 18 June 2015, Dyer joined Conference North side Tamworth on a one-year deal, following his release from Halifax.

== Honours ==
Mansfield Town

- Conference Premier: 2012–13
