= 2nd Grenadier Guards F.C. =

Former association football club in England

- Full name: 2nd Grenadier Guards Football Club
- Ground: varied per stationing
Home colours

2nd Grenadier Guards F.C. were an English football team made up of soliders from the 2nd Grenadier Guards.

== History ==
The club's first notable showing was by taking part in the London League Division One during the 1897–98 season, finishing ninth of nine. In that season champions Thames Ironworks F.C. recorded their equal biggest win of the season against the 2nd Grenadier Guards, beating them 5–1.

They joined the Southern Football League in 1908 and finished fourth of seven in Division Two. They withdrew from the league after this season.

== Colours ==
The club wore red and blue stripes.

== See also ==
- Grenadier Guards
- 3rd Grenadier Guards F.C.
