= St Albans F.C. =

- Full name: St Albans Football Club
- Founded: 1881
- Dissolved: 1904
- Ground: Clarence Park
Home colours

St Albans F.C. was a football club based in St Albans, England.

== History ==
It was founded in 1881 and competed in the Southern League in the 1897–98 and 1898–99 seasons.

They disbanded in 1904. St Albans City F.C. was established four years later.

== Colours ==
The club played in amber and navy blue.

== Grounds ==
The club played home matches at Clarence Park from 1894. Before then it played at Bernards Heath moving to Holywell Meadows in 1885 (using the Crystal Palace Inn for facilities), and later Gombards.
