= 1st Scots Guards F.C. =

Military association football club in England

- Full name: 1st Battalion Scots Guards Football Club
- Nickname: The Guards/Guardsmen
- Founded: 1891
- Ground: Varies according to stationing
Home colours

1st Scots Guards F.C. are an English football team which has existed from at least 1891.

== History ==
The club's first successes came in the 1891–92 season, when it reached the final of both the Army Football Association Cup and the Middlesex Senior Cup, losing both to the 2nd Scots Guards.

They played in the Southern League from 1895–96 and finished third of nine in Division Two. This made them eligible to play in a test match promotion decider against Clapton, which they lost 1–4. The following season they finished 8th of 13.

They also participated briefly in the London League Division One for the 1896–97 season before withdrawing, and were the last club to play Thames Ironworks at their Hermit Road ground on 8 October 1896, when they lost 1–0. The Battalion was unable to join a league in 1899, as it was sent to the Transvaal in October.

The club has never won the Army Cup, but did win the Middlesex Senior Cup in 1908–09, beating West Hampstead 4–0 in the final on the Uxbridge F.C. ground, Cameron scoring a second-half hat-trick after a deflected shot from Donald gave the Guards a half-time lead.

The Christmas truce football game of 1914 supposedly featured men from the 1st Scots Guards.

== Colours ==
The club's traditional kit is all dark blue.

== Ground ==
The club's home depended on where it was stationed. For much of the 1890s it was based in Southall.
