= Lee Stevenson =

English footballer

Personal information
- Full name: Lee Cameron Stevenson
- Date of birth: 1 June 1984 (age 42)
- Place of birth: Sheffield, England
- Position: Midfielder

Team information
- Current team: Cambridge City

Youth career
- Sheffield Wednesday

Senior career*
Years	Team	Apps	(Gls)
2003–2004	King's Lynn	37	(9)
2006–2010	Belper Town	171	(96)
2010–2011	Eastwood Town	54	(35)
2011–2014	Mansfield Town	55	(18)
2011	→ Alfreton Town (loan)	3	(0)
2014–	Alfreton Town	14	(2)
2014	→ Stockport County (loan)	9	(3)
2015	→ King's Lynn Town (loan)	6	(3)
2015–2017	King's Lynn Town	75	(23)
2017	Shaw Lane		
2017–	Cambridge City (Dual reg.)	4	(0)

Managerial career
- 2016–2017: King's Lynn Town (player-assistant)
- * Club domestic league appearances and goals as of 6 April 2017 (UTC)

Lee Cameron Stevenson (born 1 June 1984) is an English semi-professional footballer who plays for Cambridge City as a midfielder on a dual registration.

== Playing career ==
Stevenson first joined Southern League side King's Lynn from Sheffield Wednesday towards the end of the 2002–03 season, scoring three times in eight appearances. His ability and performances over those games made him instantly popular with supporters of the Norfolk club.

Preparations for the 2003–04 season looked extremely promising when The Linnets announced Stevenson would be signing a permanent deal for the coming season. However, he ruptured a cruciate knee ligament during a pre-season training camp and it looked unlikely that he would take any part in the following season. He underwent surgery following his injury, and managed to return to action in February 2004. He came on as a substitute in a 5-0 league win at Erith & Belvedere, scoring within 60 seconds of coming on to the field. He played in all of King's Lynn's final 16 matches that season and scored some crucial goals as they eventually secured the Southern League Eastern Division title by 3 points. This saw them gain promotion to the Southern Premier League.

Stevenson remained with The Linnets for the start of the 2004–05 season in the new look Southern Premier League with the club tipped amongst the favourites for promotion again. However the season began inconsistently for both the club (which saw the managers depart after just eight games); and Stevenson who was struggling with injuries and in and out of the team as a result. New manager Tommy Taylor began dramatically reshaping the playing squad, despite releasing a number of players he expressed that he was keen to keep Stevenson. However, he was forced to announce his departure from the club in November 2004. It had been discovered that there were still complications surrounding the knee surgery he had the previous year.

Following further surgery and almost two years out of the game, Stevenson signed for Northern League side Belper Town in 2006.

Stevenson joined Eastwood Town from Belper Town in summer 2010. He signed with Mansfield Town in May 2011, becoming a full-time professional footballer for the first time. He was loaned out to Alfreton Town in October 2011. He scored 11 goals in 27 Conference Premier games in the 2012–13 season as the "Stags" won promotion to the Football League as champions of the Conference.

In re-joined Alfreton Town for a second spell.

On 19 September 2014 he joined Stockport County on a month's loan.

On Thursday 26 March 2015, King's Lynn Town announced that Stevenson had signed on loan from Alfreton for the remainder of the season, making his debut in the 3–1 defeat by Blyth Spartans two days later. He went on to score three goals in the Linnets' final six matches of the season, helping them narrowly avoid relegation from the Northern Premier League.

Stevenson made his move back to The Walks permanent during June 2015, despite King's Lynn Town being moved from the Northern Premier to the Southern Premier Division. He missed only one game for the Linnets during the 2015–16 season, scoring 16 times from 53 appearances. On 24 May 2016 he agreed to stay at King's Lynn for the 2016–17 season. On 24 February 2017 he asked for his release from the Walks outfit after the shock departure of Gary Setchell, Sacked and replaced by the incoming Ian Culverhouse. Stevenson signed for Northern Premier First Division Side Shaw Lane on 28 February 2017, with the club in first place in the league.

== Honours ==
King's Lynn Southern League Eastern Division Champions 2003-04

Mansfield Town

- Conference Premier: 2012–13
