= List of Arsenal F.C. players (1–24 appearances) =

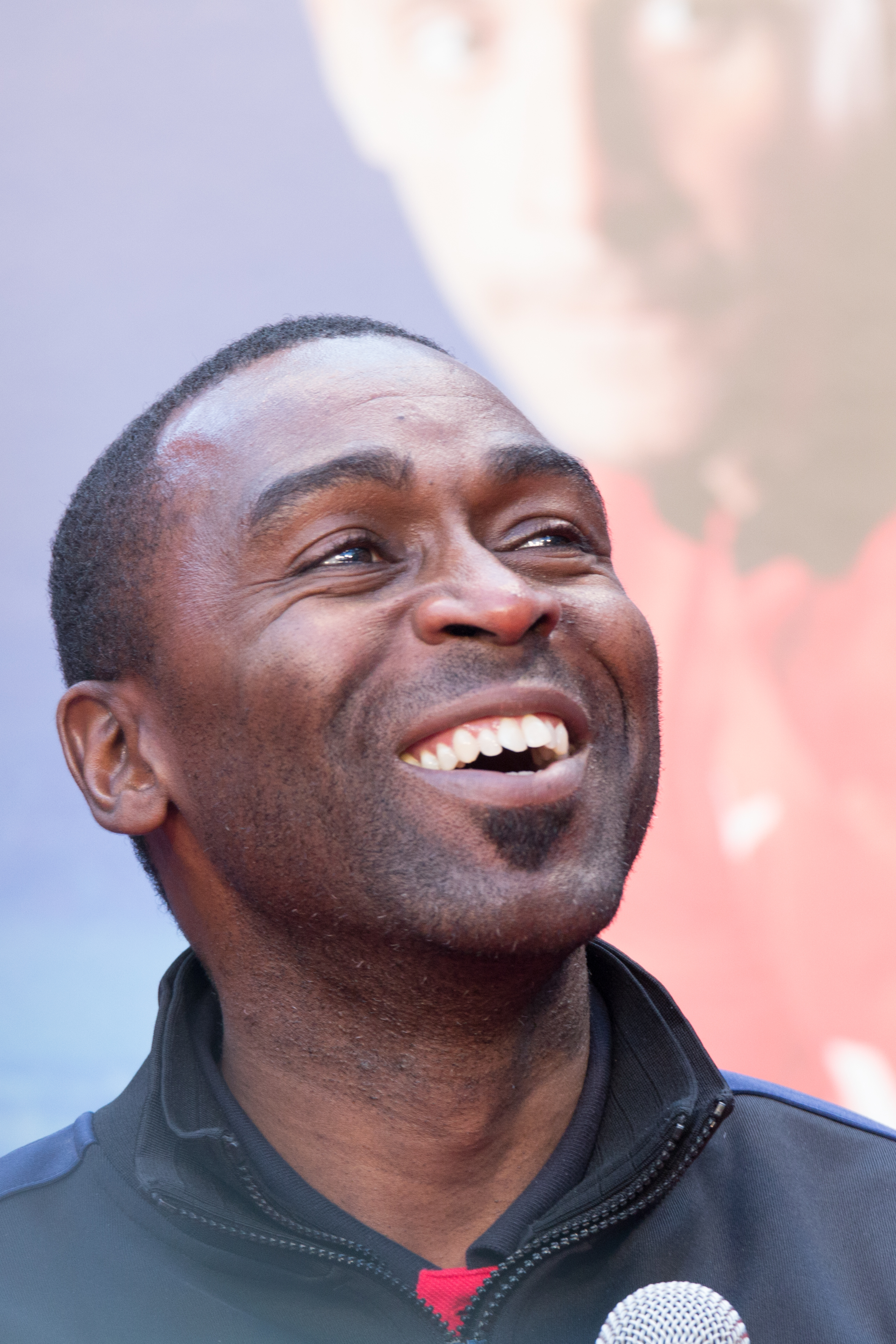
Andy Cole, who began his career at Arsenal, made two appearances for the club.

Arsenal Football Club, an association football club based in Islington, London, was founded in 1886 as Dial Square. They became the first southern member (Note: A club located in the southern counties of England. Initially these were amateur clubs, as professionalism in football was not as readily accepted in the south as in the north. In the 1893–94 season, Arsenal (under its former name Woolwich Arsenal) turned professional and became the first southern club admitted to the northern-oriented Football League. The following year saw the creation of the Southern Football League, which was composed of amateur and professional teams. By the 1920–21 season, the top division of the Southern Football League was absorbed by the Football League, to create its third division.) admitted into the Football League in 1893, having spent their first four seasons solely participating in cup tournaments and friendlies. The club's name, which shortly changed to Woolwich Arsenal, was shortened to Arsenal in 1914, a year after moving to Highbury. Despite finishing fifth in the Second Division in 1914–15, Arsenal rejoined the First Division at the expense of local rivals Tottenham Hotspur when football resumed after the First World War. Since that time, they have not fallen below the first tier of the English football league system and hold the record for the longest uninterrupted period in the top flight. The club's first team have competed in numerous national and continental organised competitions, and all players who have played between 1 and 24 such matches are listed below.

Since Arsenal's first competitive match, more than 500 players have failed to reach 25 appearances for the club. Many of these players have spent only a short period of their career at Arsenal before seeking opportunities in other teams; some players had their careers cut short by injury, while others left for other reasons. John Kosmina, who joined from Adelaide City in 1978, only made four appearances for Arsenal, before returning to his native Australia where his goalscoring record was prolific. Vladimir Petrović featured 22 times as an Arsenal first-teamer, and later forged a managerial career, coaching Red Star Belgrade and the Serbia national team. Andy Cole, who played one league match as a youngster for Arsenal, moved to Newcastle United where he won the Premier League Golden Boot in 1993–94, and enjoyed further success at Manchester United in the mid-to-late 1990s. David Bentley and Rohan Ricketts left Arsenal in pursuit of first-team football, and both went on to play for Tottenham Hotspur at certain stages of their careers.

Several players spent brief periods with Arsenal on loan from other clubs. Michal Papadopulos made one appearance in the 2003–04 season and later earned full international caps with the Czech Republic. Midfielder Kim Källström joined on a six-month spell and was part of the club's 2014 FA Cup-winning squad.

== Key ==
- The list is ordered first by date of debut, and then if necessary in alphabetical order.
- Appearances as a substitute are included. This feature of the game was introduced in the Football League at the start of the 1965–66 season.

Positions key
Pre-1960s		1960s–	
GK	Goalkeeper		
FB	Full back	DF	Defender
HB	Half back	MF	Midfielder
FW	Forward		

Nationality
Unless otherwise noted, the nationality of a player is determined by the country/countries which he has played for, or if said person has not played international football, their country of birth.
Position
Playing positions are listed according to the tactical formations that were employed at the time. Thus the change in the names of defensive and midfield positions reflects the tactical evolution that occurred from the 1960s onwards.
Club career
Club career is defined as the first and last calendar years in which the player appeared for the club in any of the competitions listed below.
Total appearances and Total goals
Total appearances and goals comprise those in the Football League, Premier League, FA Cup, Football League Cup, FA Charity/Community Shield, European Cup/UEFA Champions League, UEFA Cup, Inter-Cities Fairs Cup, UEFA Cup Winners' Cup, Football League Centenary Trophy and European Super Cup. Matches in the United League, Southern District Combination, London League and wartime competitions are excluded.

== Players ==
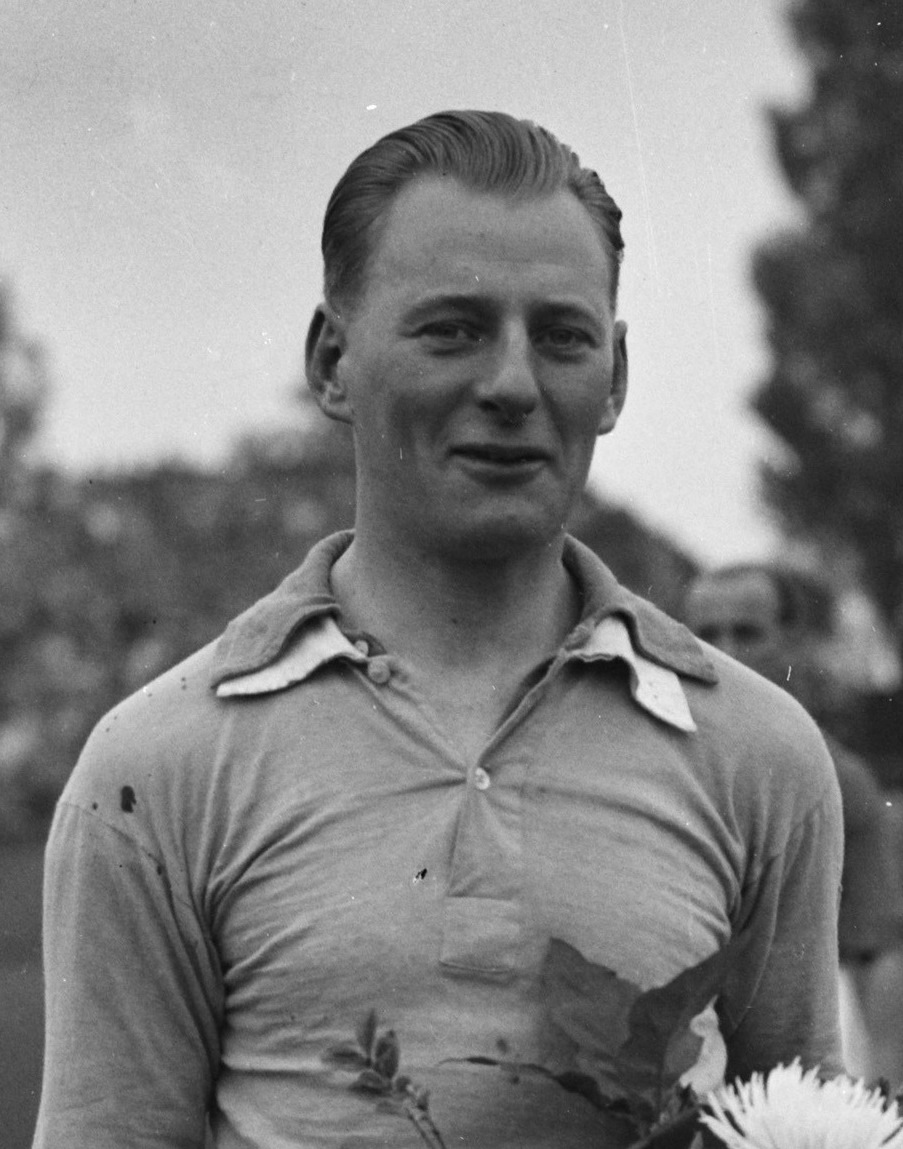
Gerrit Keizer, a Dutch goalkeeper, joined Arsenal in 1930 and made 13 appearances for the club.

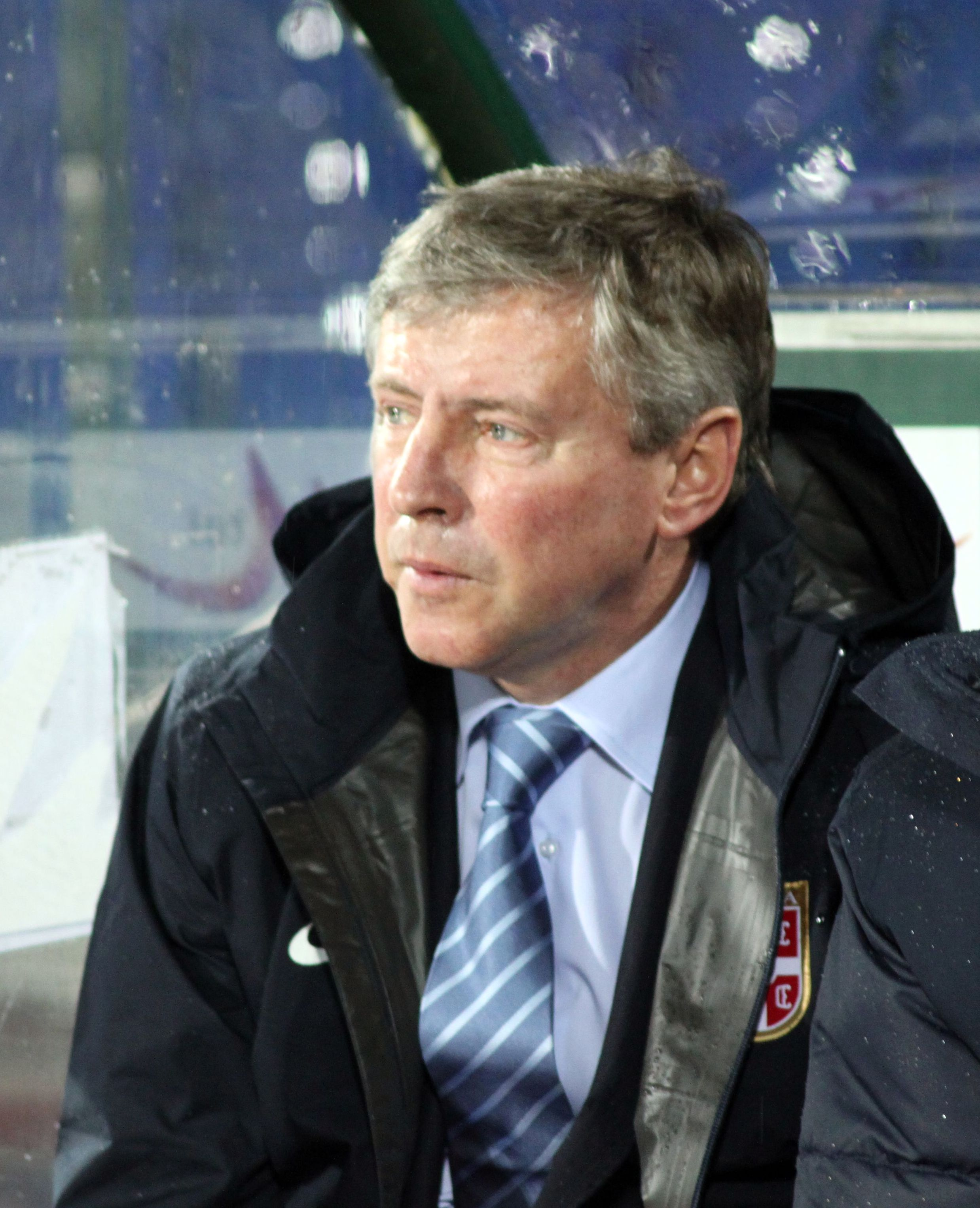
Vladimir Petrović (pictured in 2010) made 22 appearances for Arsenal, scoring twice.

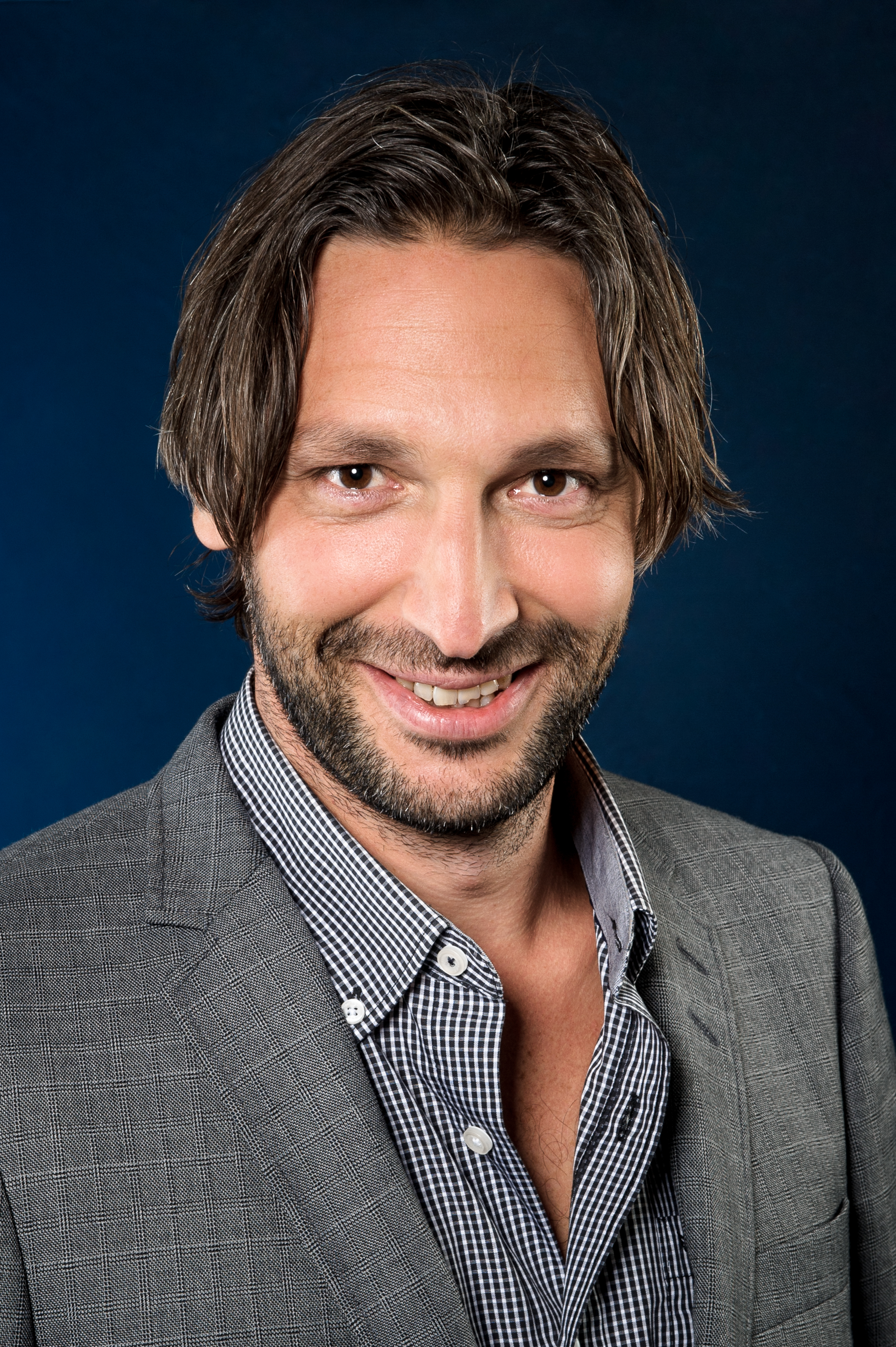
Rami Shaaban made his debut for Arsenal against PSV Eindhoven in November 2002.

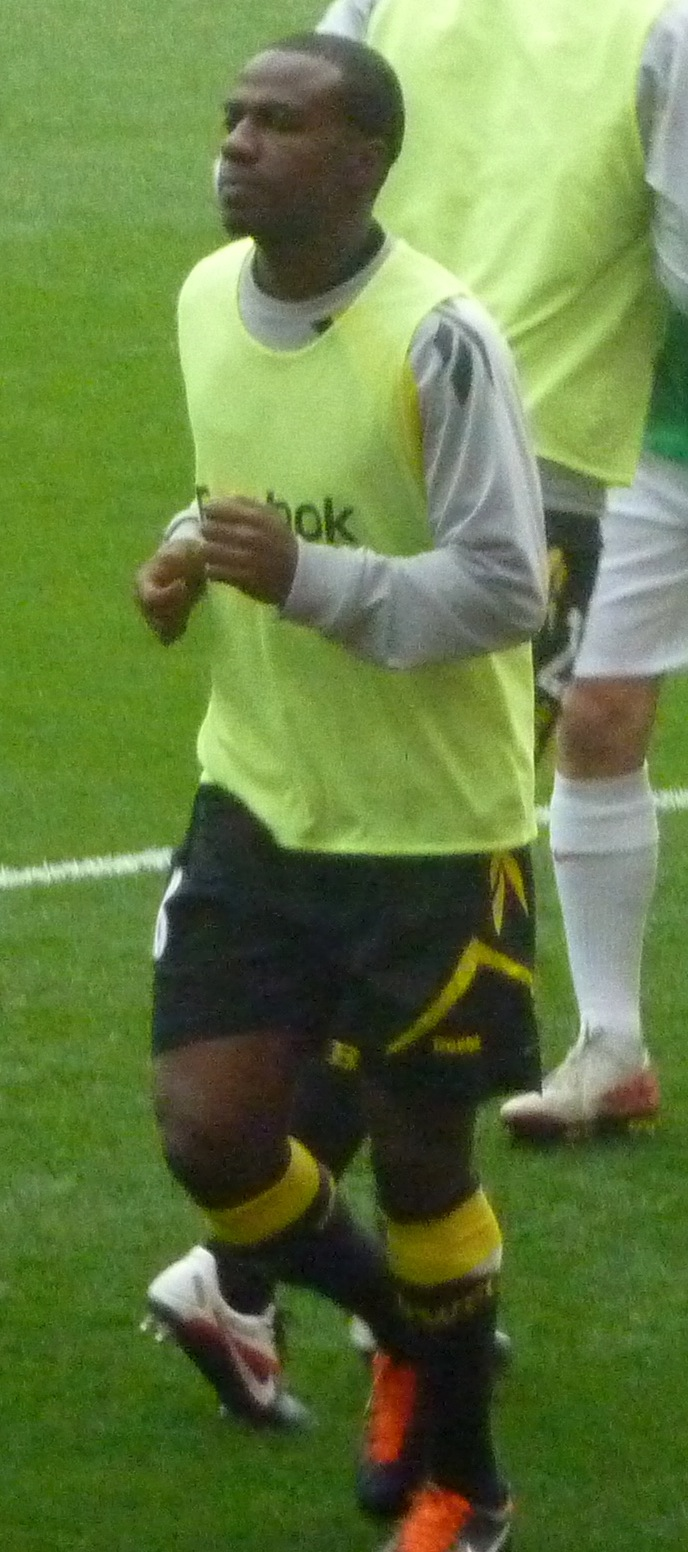
Fabrice Muamba started two League Cup games for Arsenal in the 2005–06 season.

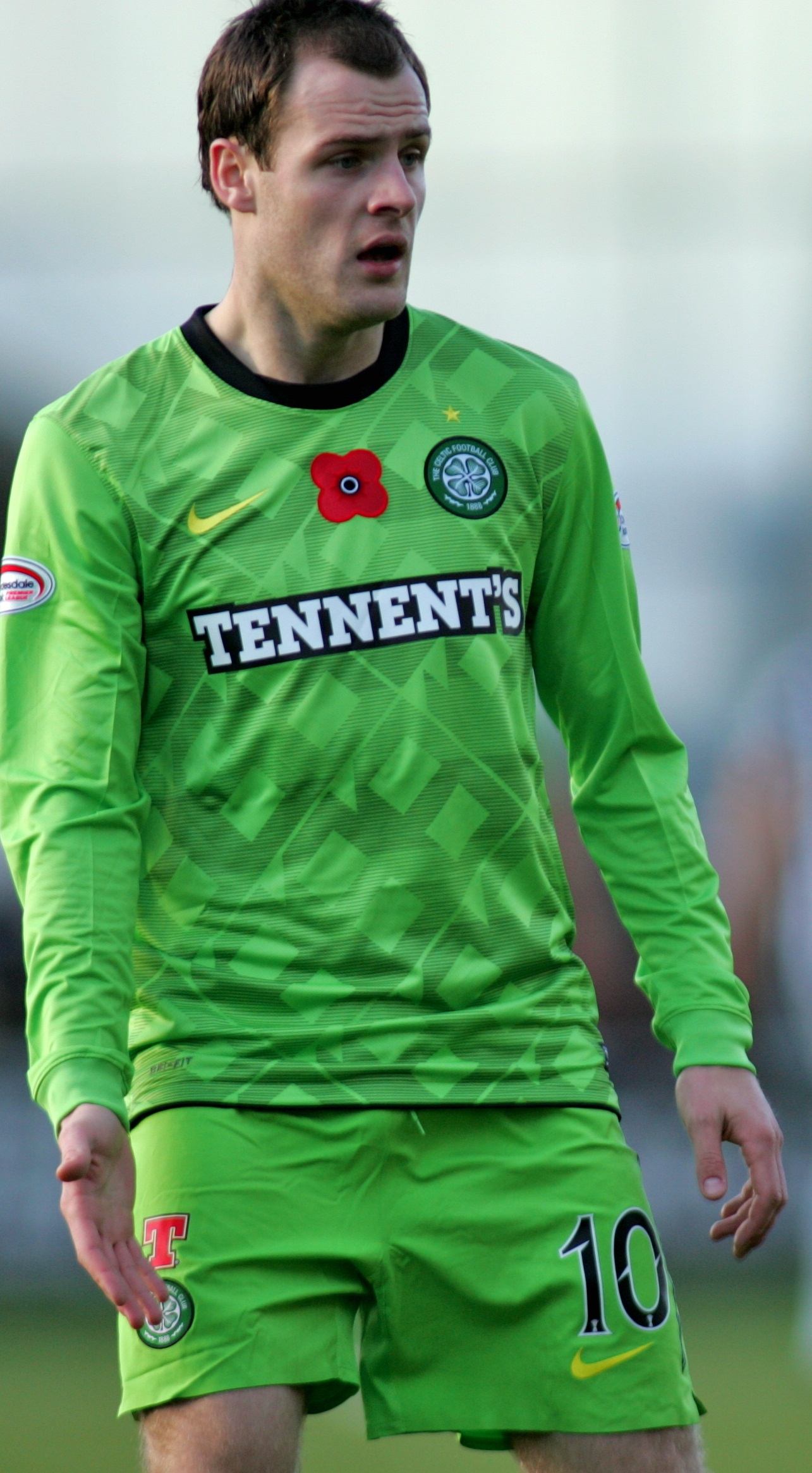
Anthony Stokes began his professional career with Arsenal, but never started in a first-team match for the club.

Players highlighted in bold are still actively playing at Arsenal.

Statistics correct as of match played 21 November 2026

List of Arsenal F.C. players with between 1 and 24 appearances
Player	Nationality	Pos	Club career	Starts	Subs	Total	Goals
Player	Nationality	Pos	Club career	Appearances			Goals
Fred Beardsley	England	GK	1889	2	0	2	0
Peter Connolly	Scotland	FB	1889–1892	6	0	6	2
Jack McBean	Scotland	FB	1889–1892	6	0	6	0
Morris Bates	England	FB	1889	3	0	3	0
Harry Offer	England	FW	1889–1891	3	0	3	1
Richard Horsington	England	FW	1889	2	0	2	1
James Meggs	England	FW	1889–1891	5	0	5	4
Humphrey Barbour	Scotland	FW	1889–1891	5	0	5	4
Hope Robertson	Scotland	FW	1889	4	0	4	4
William Scott	England	FW	1889	3	0	3	4
R. Foster	England	GK	1889	2	0	2	0
Bill Julian	England	HB	1889–1891	4	0	4	0
James Charteris	Scotland	FW	1889	1	0	1	0
William Stewart	Scotland	FB	1889–1891	2	0	2	1
Edward Williams	England	FW	1889	1	0	1	0
Edmund Bee	England	GK	1891–1892	4	0	4	0
Albert Christmas	England	FW	1891	1	0	1	0
David Gloak	England	FW	1891	1	0	1	0
Alex Robertson	Scotland	FB	1892	1	0	1	0
Bernard Shaw	England	FW	1892	1	0	1	0
George Davie	Scotland	FW	1892	4	0	4	3
Tom Graham	Scotland	FW	1892	1	0	1	0
Charles Peachey	England	FW	1892	1	0	1	0
Archie McQuilkie	Scotland	FB	1892	2	0	2	0
Frank Dyer	Scotland	FB	1892–1893	5	0	5	0
Duncan Gemmell	Scotland	FW	1892–1893	8	0	8	0
Fred Wood	England	GK	1892	1	0	1	0
Andrew Rankin	Scotland	FB	1892–1893	3	0	3	0
Charles Ambler	England	GK	1892–1895	2	0	2	0
Charlie Williams	England	GK	1893–1894	23	0	23	0
Daniel Devine	Scotland	FW	1893	4	0	4	0
Walter Shaw	England	FW	1893–1895	24	0	24	12
Joseph Heath	England	HB	1893–1896	12	0	12	7
John Storrs	England	FB	1893–1894	16	0	16	0
Joe Cooper	England	FW	1893–1894	8	0	8	2
Stanley Briggs	England	FB	1893	2	0	2	0
Frank Kirk	England	FW	1894	1	0	1	0
Arthur Worrall	England	FW	1894	4	0	4	1
Lycurgus Burrows	England	FB	1894–1895	10	0	10	0
Thomas Bryan	England	FW	1894	9	0	9	1
Walter Williams	England	FW	1894	1	0	1	0
William McNab	Scotland	FW	1894	2	0	2	1
George Jaques	England	FW	1894	2	0	2	2
Robert Stevenson	Scotland	HB	1894	7	0	7	0
William Sharpe	Scotland	FW	1894–1895	14	0	14	4
James Crozier	Scotland	GK	1894	1	0	1	0
Tommy Meade	England	FW	1895–1897	14	0	14	7
George Reece	England	FW	1895	1	0	1	0
Charlie Hare	England	FW	1895–1896	20	0	20	7
Thomas Hatfield	England	GK	1895	2	0	2	0
Allen Ward	England	FB	1895	7	0	7	0
Bob Gordon	Scotland	FW	1895–1896	20	0	20	6
William Gilmer	Ireland	GK	1896	3	0	3	0
Albert Russell	England	GK	1896	1	0	1	0
Patrick Boylan	Scotland	FB	1896	11	0	11	0
George Farmer	England	FW	1896	2	0	2	1
John Leather	England	GK	1896–1897	10	0	10	0
Tom Shrewsbury	England	HB	1896–1898	6	0	6	0
George Buist	Scotland	FB	1896–1897	6	0	6	0
Sandy MacFarlane	Scotland	FW	1896–1897	5	0	5	0
Arthur Talbot	England	GK	1896	5	0	5	0
Edwin Harding	England	FB	1896	1	0	1	0
George Carver	England	FB	1896	1	0	1	0
Jack Wilson	England	FB	1896	1	0	1	0
Edward Kington	England	FW	1896	1	0	1	0
Hugh Duff	England	FW	1896–1897	2	0	2	2
Job Whitfield	England	FB	1896–1897	2	0	2	0
Alex Caie	Scotland	FW	1897	8	0	8	4
Hugh Cassidy	Ireland	FB	1897	1	0	1	0
Edward Kane	Scotland	FB	1897	1	0	1	0
Patrick Farrell	Ireland	FB	1897–1898	22	0	22	3
Andrew Steven	Scotland	FW	1897	6	0	6	2
James Monteith	Ireland	FW	1897	6	0	6	1
James Stuart	England	FW	1897	2	0	2	1
James Devlin	Scotland	FW	1898	1	0	1	1
James Clark	England	FB	1898	4	0	4	0
James Fyfe	Scotland	FB	1898	7	0	7	0
Andrew Mitchell	Scotland	FW	1898–1899	10	0	10	2
Hugh Dailly	Scotland	FW	1898	8	0	8	4
John McPhee	Scotland	FB	1898–1899	8	0	8	0
Ernest Cottrell	England	FW	1898–1901	24	0	24	12
Thomas Hamilton	England	GK	1898–1900	7	0	7	0
John Garton	England	FB	1899	5	0	5	0
Moses Sanders	England	HB	1899	4	0	4	1
Richard Hannigan	Scotland	FW	1899	2	0	2	0
Jack Aston	England	FW	1899	15	0	15	5
Abe Hartley	Scotland	FW	1899	9	0	9	1
Jack Graham	England	FB	1899	1	0	1	0
Frank Lloyd	England	FW	1899–1900	19	0	19	3
Charles Dunsbee	England	FB	1899–1900	11	0	11	0
Joe Murrell	England	FB	1900	6	0	6	0
Tommy Spicer	England	GK	1900	4	0	4	0
John Blackwood	Scotland	FW	1900–1901	18	0	18	7
Tom Grieve	Scotland	FB	1900–1901	6	0	6	0
George Wolfe	England	FB	1900–1902	5	0	5	0
Andrew Swann	Scotland	FW	1901	7	0	7	2
Jimmy Laidlaw	Scotland	FW	1901	3	0	3	2
John Edgar	Scotland	FW	1901–1902	11	0	11	1
Isaac Owens	England	FB	1901	11	0	11	2
William Vaughan	England	FW	1901	1	0	1	0
Joe Connor	Ireland	FW	1902	16	0	16	3
Everard Lawrence	England	FW	1902–1903	23	0	23	3
William Bradshaw	England	FW	1902–1904	4	0	4	2
Stephen Theobald	England	FB	1902–1909	24	0	24	0
Billy Bannister	England	FB	1903	22	0	22	0
Harry Thorpe	England	FB	1903–1904	10	0	10	0
Tom Pratt	England	FW	1903–1904	10	0	10	2
Walter Busby	England	FW	1903–1904	6	0	6	2
Frank Ransom	Ireland	FB	1903	1	0	1	0
Edward Anderson	Scotland	FW	1904	2	0	2	0
Bob Watson	England	FW	1904–1905	10	0	10	1
James Buchan	Scotland	HB	1904–1905	8	0	8	0
John Hunter	Scotland	FW	1904–1905	22	0	22	4
Alex Davidson	Scotland	GK	1904	1	0	1	0
Alfred Crowe	England	FW	1904–1905	6	0	6	4
Fred Dwight	England	FB	1905	1	0	1	0
James Blair	Scotland	FW	1905–1906	13	0	13	3
Tom Arnold	England	FW	1905	2	0	2	0
Fred Kemp	England	FW	1905	2	0	2	0
Neve Grice	England	FW	1906	1	0	1	0
Archie Low	Scotland	FB	1906–1907	3	0	3	0
Tommy Hynds	Scotland	FB	1907	17	0	17	1
James Ferguson	Scotland	FW	1907	1	0	1	0
James Rodger	Scotland	FW	1907	1	0	1	0
Joe Satterthwaite	England	FW	1908	5	0	5	1
James Maxwell	Scotland	FW	1908–1909	2	0	2	0
Willie Curle	Scotland	FW	1908	3	0	3	0
Norman Chisholm	Scotland	FB	1908–1909	3	0	3	0
Bert Beney	England	FW	1909–1910	17	0	17	6
Thomas Drain	Scotland	FW	1909	2	0	2	0
Frank Heppinstall	England	FW	1909–1910	23	0	23	0
George Fisher	England	GK	1909	2	0	2	0
Spencer Bassett	England	FB	1909	1	0	1	0
Harold Oliver	England	FW	1909	1	0	1	0
Robert Stevens	Scotland	FW	1909–1910	7	0	7	1
Matthew McKellar	Scotland	FW	1909–1910	5	0	5	2
Bill Buckenham	England	FW	1909–1910	21	0	21	5
Charlie McGibbon	England	FW	1910	4	0	4	3
Willis Rippon	England	FW	1910–1911	9	0	9	2
Harry Logan	Scotland	FW	1910–1911	11	0	11	0
James Quayle	England	FB	1910	1	0	1	0
Matthew Shortt	Scotland	FW	1910	4	0	4	0
Leslie Calder	England	FW	1911	1	0	1	0
Fred Calvert	England	FW	1911	2	0	2	1
Leigh Richmond Roose	Wales	GK	1911–1912	13	0	13	0
Joe McLauchlan	Scotland	FW	1911–1913	16	0	16	3
John Grant	England	FW	1912	4	0	4	3
George Payne	England	FW	1912–1913	3	0	3	0
George Burrell	England	FW	1912–1913	24	0	24	3
Ernest Hanks	England	FW	1912	4	0	4	1
Billy Spittle	England	FW	1912–1914	7	0	7	0
Edward King	England	FW	1912–1913	13	0	13	0
David Duncan	Ireland	FW	1912–1913	5	0	5	2
George Ford	England	FB	1912–1915	10	0	10	0
Robert Evans	England	FB	1913	2	0	2	0
Archie Devine	Scotland	FW	1913–1914	24	0	24	5
Oliver Wilson	England	GK	1913	1	0	1	0
James Caldwell	England	GK	1913	3	0	3	0
Donald Slade	England	FW	1913–1914	12	0	12	4
Charlie Bell	Scotland	FW	1913	1	0	1	2
James Norman	England	FW	1914	4	0	4	0
Arthur Kempton	England	GK	1915	1	0	1	0
Alf Fletcher	England	HB	1915	3	0	3	0
Ned Liddle	England	FB	1915	2	0	2	0
Dan Burgess	England	FW	1919–1921	13	0	13	1
Frank Cownley	England	FB	1920–1922	15	0	15	0
Joe North	England	FW	1920–1921	23	0	23	6
Ernest Coopland	England	FW	1920	1	0	1	0
George Pattison	England	FB	1920–1922	10	0	10	0
James Smith	England	FW	1920	10	0	10	1
Harold Walden	England	FW	1921	2	0	2	1
Alex McKenzie	Scotland	FW	1921–1923	15	0	15	2
James Hopkins	Ireland	FW	1921–1922	22	0	22	7
Bill Henderson	England	FW	1921–1922	7	0	7	0
Sturdy Maxwell	Scotland	FW	1921	1	0	1	0
Walter Creegan	England	FW	1922	6	0	6	0
Stan Earle	England	FW	1922–1923	4	0	4	3
Frank Townrow	England	FW	1922–1923	9	0	9	2
Archie Roe	England	FW	1922	4	0	4	1
John Clark	England	FW	1923–1924	6	0	6	0
Richard Elvey	England	FB	1923	1	0	1	0
Ernie Wallington	England	FW	1923	1	0	1	0
Fred Jones	England	FW	1924	2	0	2	0
Donald Cock	England	FW	1925	3	0	3	0
Joseph Hughes	England	FW	1925	1	0	1	0
Arthur Roe	England	HB	1925	1	0	1	0
John Rutherford	England	FW	1925	1	0	1	0
Herbert Lawson	England	FW	1926	16	0	16	2
Jack Lee	England	FW	1926–1927	7	0	7	0
Charles Barley	England	FW	1927–1929	10	0	10	1
James Shaw	England	FW	1927–1928	11	0	11	4
Reg Tricker (Note: Tricker was born in Karachi, British India (now Pakistan), but is considered a British citizen by descent under nationality law.)	England	FW	1927–1929	12	0	12	5
John Moody	England	GK	1927–1928	6	0	6	0
Ted Bowen	England	FW	1927	1	0	1	0
Archie Clark	England	FB	1927	1	0	1	0
William Paterson	Scotland	GK	1928–1929	15	0	15	0
William Maycock	England	FW	1928	1	0	1	0
Bill Johnstone	Scotland	FW	1929–1930	9	0	9	4
Dave Halliday	Scotland	FW	1929–1930	15	0	15	8
Bert Humpish	England	HB	1930	3	0	3	0
Gerrit Keizer	Netherlands	GK	1930	13	0	13	0
Reg Stockill	England	FW	1932–1933	7	0	7	4
Tommy Black	Scotland	HB	1933	1	0	1	0
Billy Warnes	England	FW	1933	1	0	1	0
Charlie Walsh	England	FW	1933	1	0	1	0
Ralph Birkett	England	FW	1933–1935	23	0	23	11
Peter Dougall	Scotland	FW	1934–1936	23	0	23	5
George Cox	England	FW	1934–1936	7	0	7	1
James Marshall	Scotland	FW	1934	5	0	5	1
Ehud Rogers	Wales	FW	1935–1936	16	0	16	5
Reg Trim	England	FB	1935	1	0	1	0
Sidney Cartwright	England	FB	1936–1939	16	0	16	2
Ernie Tuckett	England	FW	1936	2	0	2	0
Ronnie Westcott	England	FW	1936	2	0	2	1
Arthur Biggs	England	FW	1937	3	0	3	0
George Hunt	England	FW	1937–1938	21	0	21	3
Ernie Collett	England	FB	1937–1947	21	0	21	0
Mal Griffiths	Wales	FW	1938	9	0	9	5
Eddie Carr	England	FW	1938	12	0	12	7
Gordon Bremner	Scotland	FW	1938–1939	15	0	15	4
Horace Cumner	Wales	FW	1938–1946	14	0	14	3
Wilf Walsh	Wales	FW	1938	3	0	3	0
David Pryde	Scotland	FW	1939	4	0	4	0
Alf Fields	England	FB	1939–1950	19	0	19	0
Sid Pugh	England	FB	1939	1	0	1	0
George Curtis	England	FW	1939–1947	14	0	14	0
George Marks	England	GK	1939	2	0	2	0
Andrew Farr	Scotland	FW	1939	2	0	2	1
Kevin O'Flanagan	Republic of Ireland	FW	1946–1949	16	0	16	3
Les Henley	England	HB	1946	1	0	1	0
Harry Waller	England	HB	1946–1947	9	0	9	0
Cyril Hodges	England	FW	1946	2	0	2	0
Alan Smith	England	FW	1946	3	0	3	0
Albert Guðmundsson	Iceland	FW	1946	2	0	2	0
Cyril Grant	England	FW	1946	2	0	2	0
Stan Morgan	Wales	FW	1946	2	0	2	0
Tommy Rudkin	England	FW	1947	5	0	5	2
Alf Calverley	England	FW	1947	11	0	11	0
Thomas Vallance	England	FW	1948–1949	15	0	15	2
Noel Kelly	Republic of Ireland	FW	1950	1	0	1	0
John Chenhall	England	FB	1951–1953	16	0	16	0
James Robertson	Scotland	FW	1952	1	0	1	0
Don Oakes	England	FB	1952–1955	11	0	11	1
Peter Tilley	Northern Ireland	FW	1953	1	0	1	0
Brian Walsh	England	FW	1953–1955	17	0	17	0
Ralph Guthrie	England	GK	1954	2	0	2	0
Jack Wilkinson	England	FW	1955	1	0	1	0
Ray Swallow	England	FW	1955–1957	13	0	13	4
Daniel Le Roux	South Africa	FW	1957	5	0	5	0
Tony Biggs	England	FW	1958	4	0	4	1
Len Julians	England	FW	1958–1960	24	0	24	10
Peter Goy	England	GK	1959	2	0	2	0
Roy Goulden	England	FW	1959	1	0	1	0
Denis Clapton	England	FW	1959–1961	4	0	4	0
Mike Everitt	England	DF	1960	9	0	9	1
Peter Kane	Scotland	FW	1960	4	0	4	1
Allan Young	England	DF	1960–1961	4	0	4	0
Frank O'Neill	Republic of Ireland	FW	1960–1961	2	0	2	0
Arfon Griffiths	Wales	FW	1961–1962	15	0	15	2
Eddie Clamp	England	MF	1961–1962	24	0	24	1
Rodney Smithson	England	DF	1962	2	0	2	0
Gordon Ferry	England	DF	1964	11	0	11	0
Brian Tawse	Scotland	GK	1964–1965	5	0	5	0
Tommy Baldwin	England	MF	1965–1966	20	0	20	11
Tom Walley	Wales	MF	1965–1967	14	4	18	1
Gordon Neilson	Scotland	FW	1966–1967	17	0	17	3
Roy Pack	England	DF	1966	1	0	1	0
Jimmy McGill	Scotland	MF	1966	8	4	12	0
Tommy Coakley	Scotland	MF	1966	13	0	13	2
Alan Tyrer	England	FW	1966	1	1	2	0
Micky Boot	England	DF	1966	4	1	5	2
John Woodward	Scotland	DF	1966–1967	3	1	4	0
Roger Davidson	England	MF	1968	0	1	1	0
Malcolm Webster	England	GK	1969	6	0	6	0
Paul Davies	Wales	FW	1971	0	2	2	0
Brendon Batson	England	DF	1972–1973	6	4	10	0
Brian Chambers	England	MF	1973	1	1	2	0
Wilf Rostron	England	MF	1975–1977	14	5	19	2
Pat Howard	England	DF	1976–1977	19	1	20	0
Mark Heeley	England	FW	1977–1979	13	7	20	1
Jim Harvey	Northern Ireland	MF	1978	3	1	4	0
John Kosmina	Australia	FW	1978	1	3	4	0
Paul Barron	England	GK	1978–1980	8	0	8	0
Kevin Stead	England	DF	1978	1	1	2	0
Steve Brignall	England	DF	1979	0	1	1	0
John Hawley	England	FW	1981–1983	15	6	21	3
Ray Hankin	England	FW	1981	0	2	2	0
Paul Gorman	Republic of Ireland	MF	1982–1983	5	1	6	0
Danny O'Shea	England	MF	1982	9	0	9	0
Vladimir Petrović	Serbia	MF	1983	19	3	22	3
John Kay	England	DF	1983–1984	13	1	14	0
David Madden	England	MF	1983	2	0	2	0
David Cork	England	FW	1983–1984	6	2	8	1
Brian Sparrow	England	DF	1984	2	0	2	0
Rhys Wilmot	Wales	GK	1986–1987	9	0	9	0
Sigurður Jónsson	Iceland	MF	1989–1990	3	7	10	1
Kwame Ampadu	Republic of Ireland	MF	1990	0	2	2	0
Andy Cole	England	FW	1990–1991	0	2	2	0
Pål Lydersen	Norway	DF	1992–1993	13	3	16	0
Neil Heaney	England	FW	1992–1993	4	4	8	0
Mark Flatts	England	MF	1992–1995	10	8	18	0
Alan Miller	England	GK	1992–1994	6	2	8	0
Gavin McGowan	England	DF	1993–1998	4	3	7	0
Vince Bartram	England	GK	1994–1995	11	1	12	0
Paul Shaw	England	MF	1994–1997	1	12	13	2
Adrian Clarke	England	MF	1994–1996	5	4	9	0
Chris Kiwomya	England	FW	1995	6	11	17	3
Matthew Rose	England	DF	1996–1997	2	3	5	0
Lee Harper	England	GK	1997	1	0	1	0
Jason Crowe	England	DF	1997–1998	0	3	3	0
Alberto Méndez	Germany	MF	1997–2000	6	5	11	2
Jehad Muntasser	Libya	MF	1997	0	1	1	0
Paolo Vernazza	England	MF	1997–2000	7	4	11	1
Isaiah Rankin	England	FW	1997	0	1	1	0
David Grondin	France	DF	1998–1999	4	0	4	0
Omer Riza	Turkey	FW	1998	0	1	1	0
Fabián Caballero	Argentina	FW	1998–1999	0	3	3	0
Michael Black	England	MF	1998	0	1	1	0
Kaba Diawara	Guinea	FW	1999	3	12	15	0
Stefan Malz	Germany	MF	1999–2001	6	8	14	2
Tommy Black	England	MF	1999–2000	1	1	2	0
Rhys Weston	Wales	DF	1999–2000	2	1	3	0
Graham Barrett	Republic of Ireland	FW	1999–2000	1	2	3	0
Julian Gray	England	MF	2000	0	1	1	0
Brian McGovern	Republic of Ireland	DF	2000	0	1	1	0
Lee Canoville	England	DF	2000	0	1	1	0
Moritz Volz	Germany	DF	2000–2002	1	1	2	0
Tomas Danilevičius	Lithuania	FW	2000–2001	0	3	3	0
Junichi Inamoto	Japan	MF	2001–2002	2	2	4	0
Richard Wright	England	GK	2001–2002	22	0	22	0
John Halls	England	MF	2001	0	3	3	0
Carlin Itonga	DR Congo	FW	2001	0	1	1	0
Rohan Ricketts	England	MF	2001	0	1	1	0
Stathis Tavlaridis	Greece	DF	2001–2003	7	1	8	0
Juan	Brazil	MF	2001–2002	2	0	2	0
Sebastian Svärd	Denmark	MF	2001–2004	2	2	4	0
Ryan Garry	England	DF	2002–2003	1	1	2	0
Rami Shaaban	Sweden	GK	2002	5	0	5	0
David Bentley	England	MF	2003–2004	5	4	9	1
Quincy Owusu-Abeyie	Ghana	FW	2003–2006	8	15	23	2
Ryan Smith	England	FW	2003–2004	2	4	6	0
John Spicer	England	MF	2003	0	1	1	0
Graham Stack	Republic of Ireland	GK	2003–2004	5	0	5	0
Jerome Thomas	England	FW	2003–2004	1	2	3	0
Michal Papadopulos	Czech Republic	FW	2003	0	1	1	0
Frank Simek	United States	DF	2003	1	0	1	0
Ólafur Ingi Skúlason	Iceland	MF	2003	0	1	1	0
Danny Karbassiyoon	United States	DF	2004–2005	1	2	3	1
Sebastian Larsson	Sweden	MF	2004–2006	7	5	12	0
Arturo Lupoli	Italy	FW	2004–2006	6	3	9	3
Patrick Cregg	Republic of Ireland	MF	2004–2005	0	3	3	0
Fabrice Muamba	England	MF	2005	2	0	2	0
Anthony Stokes	Republic of Ireland	FW	2005	0	1	1	0
Kerrea Gilbert	England	DF	2005–2009	10	2	12	0
Matthew Connolly	England	DF	2006–2007	1	1	2	0
Mark Randall	England	MF	2006–2009	4	9	13	0
Mart Poom	Estonia	GK	2006–2007	1	1	2	0
Lassana Diarra	France	MF	2007	9	5	14	0
Fran Mérida	Spain	MF	2007–2010	7	9	16	2
Nacer Barazite	Netherlands	FW	2007–2009	0	3	3	0
Henri Lansbury	England	MF	2007–2011	1	7	8	1
Gavin Hoyte	England	DF	2008	4	0	4	0
Jay Simpson	England	FW	2008	1	2	3	2
Amaury Bischoff	Portugal	MF	2008–2009	0	4	4	0
Rui Fonte	Portugal	FW	2008	0	1	1	0
Paul Rodgers	England	DF	2008	1	0	1	0
Vito Mannone	Italy	GK	2009–2012	22	1	23	0
Gilles Sunu	Togo	FW	2009	1	1	2	0
Sanchez Watt	England	FW	2009	1	2	3	1
Craig Eastmond	England	MF	2009–2010	7	3	10	0
Kyle Bartley	England	DF	2009	1	0	1	0
Thomas Cruise	England	DF	2009	1	0	1	0
Jay Emmanuel-Thomas	England	FW	2010	1	4	5	0
Ignasi Miquel	Spain	DF	2011–2013	9	5	14	1
Conor Henderson	Republic of Ireland	MF	2011	1	0	1	0
Emmanuel Frimpong	Ghana	MF	2011–2012	10	6	16	0
Chuks Aneke	England	MF	2011	0	1	1	0
Ryo Miyaichi	Japan	FW	2011–2013	2	5	7	0
Oğuzhan Özyakup	Turkey	MF	2011	0	2	2	0
Park Chu-young	South Korea	FW	2011–2013	4	3	7	1
Daniel Boateng	England	DF	2011	0	1	1	0
Nico Yennaris	China	DF	2011–2012	2	2	4	0
Martin Angha	Switzerland	DF	2012	1	1	2	0
Serge Gnabry	Germany	FW	2012–2016	9	9	18	1
Thomas Eisfeld	Germany	MF	2012–2013	1	1	2	1
Jernade Meade	England	MF	2012	0	2	2	0
Yaya Sanogo	France	FW	2013–2014	9	11	20	1
Chuba Akpom	England	FW	2013–2018	1	11	12	0
Isaac Hayden	Jamaica	DF	2013–2014	2	0	2	0
Kristoffer Olsson	Sweden	MF	2013	0	1	1	0
Gedion Zelalem	United States	MF	2014	0	4	4	0
Kim Källström	Sweden	MF	2014	1	3	4	0
Stefan O'Connor	England	DF	2014	0	1	1	0
Ismaël Bennacer	Algeria	MF	2015	0	1	1	0
Krystian Bielik	Poland	MF	2015–2016	0	2	2	0
Glen Kamara	Finland	MF	2015	1	0	1	0
Jeff Reine-Adélaïde	France	MF	2016–2018	5	3	8	0
Lucas Pérez	Spain	FW	2016–2018	9	12	21	7
Chris Willock	England	FW	2016	0	2	2	0
Josh Dasilva	England	FW	2017–2018	0	3	3	0
Marcus McGuane	England	MF	2017	0	2	2	0
Ben Sheaf	England	MF	2017–2021	0	2	2	0
Matt Macey	England	GK	2017–2021	2	0	2	0
Konstantinos Mavropanos	Greece	DF	2018–2022	7	1	8	0
Stephan Lichtsteiner	Switzerland	DF	2018–2019	19	4	23	1
Julio Pleguezuelo	Spain	DF	2018	0	1	1	0
Zech Medley	England	DF	2018–2021	0	3	3	0
Charlie Gilmour	Scotland	MF	2018	0	2	2	0
Denis Suárez	Spain	MF	2018	0	6	6	0
Pablo Marí	Spain	DF	2020–2023	22	0	22	1
Ben Cottrell	England	MF	2020–2023	0	1	1	0
Miguel Azeez	England	MF	2020–2024	0	1	1	0
Rúnar Alex Rúnarsson	Iceland	GK	2020–2024	5	1	6	0
Folarin Balogun	United States	FW	2020–2023	2	8	10	2
Mathew Ryan	Australia	GK	2021	3	0	3	0
Charlie Patino	England	MF	2021–2024	1	1	2	1
Marquinhos	Brazil	FW	2022–2025	3	3	6	1
Matt Turner	United States	GK	2022–2023	7	0	7	0
Karl Hein	Estonia	GK	2022	1	0	1	0
**Charles Sagoe Jr.**	England	FW	2023–	1	0	1	0
**Jack Porter**	England	GK	2024–	1	0	1	0
Josh Nichols	England	DF	2024	1	0	1	0
Maldini Kacurri	Albania	DF	2024	0	1	1	0
**Ismeal Kabia**	Netherlands	FW	2024–	0	1	1	0
**Tommy Setford**	England	GK	2024–	1	1	2	0
Ayden Heaven	England	DF	2024–2025	0	1	1	0
Nathan Butler-Oyedeji	England	FW	2025	0	2	2	0
Neto	Brazil	GK	2025	1	0	1	0
**Max Dowman**	England	MF	2025–	6	13	19	3
Christian Nørgaard	Denmark	MF	2025–2026	11	9	20	0
**Kepa Arrizabalaga**	Spain	GK	2025–	13	1	14	0
**Andre Harriman-Annous**	England	FW	2025–	1	1	2	0
**Marli Salmon**	England	DF	2025–	3	3	6	0
**Ife Ibrahim**	England	MF	2026–	0	2	2	0
**Brando Bailey-Joseph**	England	FW	2026–	0	1	1	0
**Jaden Dixon**	England	DF	2026–	0	1	1	0
**Christos Tzolis**	Greece	FW	2026–	8	4	12	0
**Bruno Guimarães**	Brazil	MF	2026–	9	6	15	2
**Ezri Konsa**	England	DF	2026–	13	3	16	1
**Theo Julienne**	England	MF	2026–	0	1	1	0
**Illan Meslier**	France	GK	2026–	1	0	1	0
**Ceadach O'Neill**	Northern Ireland	FW	2026–	1	0	1	0
