= 1886–87 Royal Arsenal F.C. season =

English football club season

Dial Square / Royal Arsenal
1886–87 season
- Chairman: None
- Manager: None
- Ground: Plumstead Common
Home colours

The 1886–87 English football season was the first in which the club that was to become Arsenal Football Club competed. At the Dial Square workshop in the Royal Arsenal, Kent (later London), munition workers agreed to expand the Dial Square Cricket Club to incorporate an amateur football team – Dial Square Football Club. Among the several workers who helped form the club, the men primarily responsible were David Danskin, Elijah Watkins and Fred Beardsley. The team played their first game on 11 December 1886 in Millwall against a pub team called Eastern Wanderers, Dial Square won 6–0 with unknown goal scorers.

Following their first match, the workers changed the club's name to Royal Arsenal Football Club; a club committee was formed as Danskin and Beardsley were voted captain and vice-captain respectively. Royal Arsenal won their first home game 6–1 on Plumstead Common against Erith on 8 January 1887. Facilities in local pubs were often used as changing rooms and administrative hubs during the season. In their first season, the club played ten friendly games; scoring 36 goals and conceding eight. They faced five different opponents twice, both home and away.

== Establishment ==
The club was formed by David Danskin and other workers from the Royal Arsenal, Woolwich. Early games were played under the name Dial Square.

Home games were played on an area of Plumstead Common that is now bordered by Heavitree Road, Waverley Crescent and St John's Terrace. Players used The Star Inn public house in Jago Close as a dressing room.

The club's first match was against Eastern Wanderers on 11 December 1886. The match was played on a piece of scrap land in what is now Tiller Road on the Isle of Dogs.

In his book "Forward, Arsenal!", Bernard Joy gave the team line-up for first match as: Beardsley, Danskin, Porteous, Gregory, Bee, Wolfe, Smith, Moy, Whitehead, Morris, Duggan. However, in 1953 Robert Thompson claimed that he played in the first game (along with Wells in place of Morris and Duggan) and scored the first goal. Further, it has been found that Fred Beardsley played for Nottingham Forest in the FA Cup that day.

Thompson also claimed to have suggested the name Royal Arsenal. From Thompson's account, it appears that the first game played as Royal Arsenal was against Millwall Rovers on 5 February 1887.

== Players ==
Players that were reported as having played for Dial Square / Royal Arsenal during the 1886–87 season include:

- (Scotland) David Danskin (captain)
- (England) Fred Beardsley (vice-captain)
- (England) Joseph Bee
- James Crichton
- Robert Crichton
- Charles Duggan
- John Gellatly
- Thomas Gregory
- Alfred Morris
- James Moy
- Richard Pearce
- Duncan Porteous
- Richard Price
- George Smith
- Robert Thompson
- Thomas Wells
- G Whitehead
- (England) Frank Wolfe
- (England) Morris Bates

== Club officials ==
Committee members

- David Danskin
- Fred Beardsley
- Joseph Bee
- Thomas Wells
- Duncan Porteous
- G Whitehead
- George Smith
- Thomas Gregory
- Trainer: Morris Bates
- Secretary: Elijah Watkins
- Treasurer: Fred Beardsley

Jack Humble was probably involved with the club during the season.

== Matches ==
=== Friendlies ===
All matches that Dial Square / Royal Arsenal played during the 1886–87 season were friendlies. Significant matches were:

- 11 December 1886 v Eastern Wanderers (A) – the club's first-ever game
- 8 January 1887 v Erith (H) – the club's first home game and the club's first game under the name Royal Arsenal
- 5 February 1887 v Millwall Rovers (A)-First defeat

11 December 1886	Eastern Wanderers	0–6	Dial Square

8 January 1887	Royal Arsenal	6–1	Erith

15 January 1887	Royal Arsenal	11–0	Alexandra United

22 January 1887	Royal Arsenal	1–0	Eastern Wanderers

29 January 1887	Erith	2–3	Royal Arsenal

5 February 1887	Millwall Rovers	4–0	Royal Arsenal
				Attendance: 600

12 February 1887	Alexandra United	0–6	Royal Arsenal

26 February 1887	Royal Arsenal	0–0	2nd Rifle Brigade

12 March 1887	Royal Arsenal	3–0	Millwall Rovers

26 March 1887	2nd Rifle Brigade	1–0	Royal Arsenal
