= 1889–90 Royal Arsenal F.C. season =

English football club season

Royal Arsenal F.C.
1889–1890 season
- Chairman: None
- Manager: None
- Stadium: Manor Field, Plumstead
- FA Cup: 4th qualifying round
- London Senior Cup: Runner-up
- Kent Senior Cup: Winner
- London Charity Cup: Winner
- Top goalscorer: League: Comp: Robertson/Barbour (15); All: All: Barbour (33)
- Highest home attendance: 8000 vs London Caledonians F.C. (3 May 1890)
- Lowest home attendance: 1000 vs West Kent/Foxes (9 Nov 1889/25 Jan 1890)

1889–90 marked the 4th season of the club that was to become Arsenal F.C. They remained at the Manor Field in Plumstead for the second consecutive season, and competed in four cup competitions, including the FA Cup, for the first time, reaching the fourth qualifying round. This season saw Arsenal win their first silverware, in the form of the Kent Senior Cup and the London Charity Cup, whilst also finishing runners up in the London Senior Cup.

== Players ==
Below is a list of players who made at least one appearance for Royal Arsenal during the season, with number of appearances, and goals. Debutantes are marked in Bold, whilst goalkeepers are marked in Italics. David Danskin again captained Arsenal for the season. Out of 41 games played across the season, 39 full lineups were recorded, with the other 2 games line-ups being partially recorded.

	FA Cup		Other Cups		Friendlies		Total	
Player	App	Goals	App	Goals	App	Goals	App	Goals
H. Barbour	4	4	10	11	19	18	33	33
JM. Bates	3	0	10	0	21	1	34	1
FW. Beardsley	2	0	9	0	18	0	29	0
A. Brown	0	0	1	0	0	0	1	0
**WC. Campbell**	0	0	1	2	8	12	9	14
JM. Charteris	1	0	3	4	4	3	8	7
**AF. Christmas**	0	0	2	1	9	0	11	1
P. Connolly	4	2	10	2	23	2	37	6
JB. Crichton	0	0	0	0	5	0	5	0
D. Danskin	0	0	0	0	2	0	2	0
**T. Denham**	0	0	0	0	2	0	2	0
**T. Dixon**	0	0	0	0	2	0	2	0
**WC. Edwards**	0	0	0	0	1	0	1	0
**R. Foster**	2	0	1	0	2	0	5	0
**WE. Fry**	0	0	1	1	1	0	2	1
**S. Gardiner**	0	0	0	0	2	0	2	0
**W J George**	0	0	0	0	4	0	4	0
**D. Gloak**	0	0	0	0	6	3	6	3
**RJ. Grandison**	0	0	0	0	1	2	1	2
E. Hartland	0	0	0	0	1	0	1	0
**FB. Hills**	0	0	1	1	0	0	1	1
RT. Horsington	2	1	8	3	12	3	22	7
D. Howat	4	0	9	0	14	1	27	1
**JW. Julian**	2	0	10	0	19	2	31	2
**J. Kime**	0	0	0	0	1	1	1	1
JD. McBean	4	0	10	0	22	0	36	0
**M. McFie**	0	0	0	0	1	0	1	0
JW. Meggs	4	4	8	5	12	9	24	18
JA. Morris	0	0	1	1	0	0	1	1
**HT. Offer**	3	0	8	3	20	0	31	3
**J. Pell**	0	0	0	0	1	0	1	0
**HR. Robertson**	4	4	8	11	17	12	29	27
WW. Scott	3	4	3	0	1	1	7	5
Smith	0	0	0	0	1	0	1	0
**WS. Stewart**	1	0	1	0	6	0	8	0
**WE. Thomas**	0	0	1	0	1	0	2	0
H. Tomes	0	0	1	1	0	0	1	1
J. Walton	0	0	1	0	0	0	1	0
**E. Williams**	1	0	1	1	5	3	7	4
J. Wilson	0	0	1	0	2	0	3	0

== Matches ==
Below is a list of results of all fixtures played by the Royal Arsenal during the season. Out of 41 games, 4 of these were FA Cup fixtures, another 11 were competitive fixtures for other cups. They also played 26 friendlies. The overall season record stands at 31 wins, 5 draws, and 5 losses.

Date	Opponent	Ground	Competition	Result	Attendance
7 September 1889	London Caledonians F.C.	H		2-2	1500
14 September 1889	Casuals	H		6-0	2500
21 September 1889	Tottenham Hotspur F.C.	H		10-1	1500
28 September 1889	Unity	H		8-0	1200
5 October 1889	Lyndhurst F.C.	H	FA Cup	11-0	2500
12 October 1889	5th Northumberland Fusiliers	H		6-1	
19 October 1889	St. Marks College	A		2-1	
26 October 1889	Thorpe	A	FA Cup	2-2	1000
2 November 1889	Unity	H	LSC	4-1	2000
9 November 1889	West Kent	H	KSC	10-1	1000
16 November 1889	Crusaders	H	FA Cup	5-2	4500
23 November 1889	Foxes	H	LSC	4-1	2000
30 November 1889	Great Marlow	A		0-2	
7 December 1889	Swifts	H	FA Cup	1-5	6000
14 December 1889	Gravesend	A	KSC	7-2	800
14 December 1889	St. Martins Athletic	H	LSC	6-0	
21 December 1889	Ilford F.C.	A		2-0	
25 December 1889	Preston Hornets	H		5-0	4000
26 December 1889	Chatham	A		2-2	5000
27 December 1889	Reading Town F.C.	H		5-1	
4 January 1890	Windsor Phoenix	H		3-1	2500
11 January 1890	London Caledonians	N	LSC	3-1	5000
18 January 1890	Old Harrovians	H		2-1	2000
25 January 1890	Foxes	H		7-2	1000
1 February 1890	Great Marlow	H	LCC	4-1	5000
8 February 1890	Chiswick Park	H		1-1	4000
15 February 1890	Chatham	A	KSC	5-0	3000
22 February 1890	2nd Battalions Scots Guard	H		3-0	3000
1 March 1890	Birmingham St. Georges	H		1-4	4000
8 March 1890	Old Westminsters F.C.	N	LSC (Final)	0-1	5000
15 March 1890	Ilford	A		4-1	
22 March 1890	Thanet Wanderers	N	KSC (Final)	3-0	5000
29 March 1890	Clapton F.C.	A		0-2	2000
31 March 1890	Mr. WH Loraine's XI	H		3-1	3000
5 April 1890	Old Westminsters	N	LCC (Final)	3-1	10000
7 April 1890	1st Lincolnshire Regiment	H		2-1	4000
12 April 1890	Great Marlow	H		3-1	3000
19 April 1890	Chatham	H		1-0	4000
26 April 1890	Clapton	H		6-1	4000
3 May 1890	London Caledonians/Clapton XI	H		3-2	8000
10 May 1890	Millwall F.C.	A		3-3	800
