= 1978–79 Arsenal F.C. season =

English football club season

Arsenal F.C.
1978–79 season
- Chairman: Denis Hill-Wood
- Manager: Terry Neill
- First Division: 7th
- FA Cup: Winners
- League Cup: Second round
- UEFA Cup: Third round
- Top goalscorer: League: Frank Stapleton (17); All: Frank Stapleton (28)
Home colours	Away colours

The 1978–79 season was Arsenal Football Club's 53rd consecutive season in the Football League First Division. The club finished seventh in the league but won the 1978-79 FA Cup. It was their second of three consecutive FA Cup finals under manager Terry Neill. Known as the "Five Minute Final," Arsenal went 2-0 up until the 85th minute, before Manchester United brought it to a tie. Alan Sunderland scored the winning goal for Arsenal and Arsenal won the FA Cup 3-2.

Arsenal were rather less successful in other cup competitions, going out to Rotherham United in the second round in the League Cup. The team had qualified for the UEFA Cup by finishing fifth the previous season, but went out in the third round to Red Star Belgrade.

In the transfer market, Neill brought in Brian Talbot from Ipswich Town halfway through the season to strengthen Arsenal's midfield, especially with a tough cup run. Paul Barron was brought in as the understudy to goalkeeper Pat Jennings at the beginning of the season.

== Season summary ==
Arsenal had their first trophy since 1971, when they won the FA Cup final against Manchester United. Terry Neill had what was to be his only trophy as manager, and became the fifth Arsenal manager to win the FA Cup.

Arsenal had earned a place in the UEFA Cup with a fifth-place finish in the 1977-78 Football League. They faced Lokomotiv Leipzig, Hajduk Split (a game which brought Liam Brady's first goal in Europe), and Red Star Belgrade. Arsenal were eliminated by Red Star Belgrade in the third round of the competition. The Serbian side won 2-1 on aggregate, and the crucial last minute goal was scored by Dusan Savic at Highbury. In the League Cup, Arsenal went out early, losing 3-1 to Rotherham United.

For a while Arsenal had flirted with the notion of winning the league as they sat in the top four by Christmas, but the marathon battle with Sheffield Wednesday in January 1979 had put all the focus on the FA Cup, and league results had been at best average in the second half of the season.

However, the focus on the FA Cup paid dividends as Arsenal reached the "Five Minute Final." Arsenal's toughest opponent in the run up had been Third Division side managed by Jack Charlton, Sheffield Wednesday. The tie went to five matches in sixteen days. Arsenal won the fourth replay 2-0. After the first replay, Arsenal bought Brian Talbot from Ipswich for £400,000, an essential player in the team that had beat Arsenal in the FA Cup final the previous year. Talbot made his FA Cup debut in a 2-0 defeat of Notts Country before Arsenal faced Brian Clough's Nottingham Forest in the fifth round. Arsenal beat Forest 1-0 in a game where Forest hit the woodwork three times. It was Forest's first home defeat in 52 matches. Arsenal then beat Southampton in a replay, though lost Brady to injury thirty minutes from the end. Arsenal next faced Wolves under new manager John Barnwell in the semifinal. Alan Sunderland scored the second goal against his former club.

Arsenal faced Manchester United the FA Cup final. United had beaten the world-class Liverpool in the semifinal and Arsenal had played 9 games in 34 days (about 1 in every 4 days) in the run up to the final. Arsenal scored twice through Sunderland and Talbot. However, with five minutes remaining in the match, United recovered with goals from Gordon McQueen and Sammy McIlroy. From the second kick-off, Brady booted a pass to Graham Rix who crossed to the far post for Sunderland. United goalkeeper Gary Bailey misjudged the cross and Sunderland scored. Arsenal won the final, 3-2, with three goals of the five goals scored in the last five minutes of the match. Arsenal qualified for the UEFA Cup Winners' Cup with the victory.

After the season, Brady announced that he would leave the club when his contract ran out in 1980, hoping for a new challenge in European football. Malcolm Macdonald announced his retirement in August 1979 at just 29 years old.

== Squad ==
Note: Flags indicate national team as defined under FIFA eligibility rules; some limited exceptions apply. Players may hold more than one non-FIFA nationality.

Pos.	Nation	Player
GK	NIR	Pat Jennings
DF	NIR	Pat Rice
DF	NIR	Sammy Nelson
MF	ENG	Brian Talbot
DF	IRL	David O'Leary
DF	SCO	Willie Young
MF	IRL	Liam Brady
FW	ENG	Alan Sunderland
FW	IRL	Frank Stapleton
MF	ENG	David Price
MF	ENG	Graham Rix

Pos.	Nation	Player
MF	ENG	Steve Walford
DF	ENG	Steve Gatting
DF	IRL	John Devine
MF	ENG	Mark Heeley
FW	ENG	Malcolm Macdonald
GK	ENG	Paul Barron
MF	NIR	Jim Harvey
DF	ENG	Kevin Stead
FW	ENG	Paul Vaessen
DF	ENG	Steve Brignall
FW	AUS	John Kosmina
MF	ENG	Brian McDermott

== Results ==
=== First Division ===
Pos	Team	Pld	W	D	L	GF	GA	GD	Pts	Qualification or relegation
5	Leeds United	42	18	14	10	70	52	+18	50	Qualification for the UEFA Cup first round
6	Ipswich Town	42	20	9	13	63	49	+14	49	Qualification for the UEFA Cup first round
7	Arsenal	42	17	14	11	61	48	+13	48	Qualification for the European Cup Winners' Cup first round (Note: Arsenal qualified for the European Cup Winners' Cup first round as the 1978–79 FA Cup winners.)
8	Aston Villa	42	15	16	11	59	49	+10	46	
9	Manchester United	42	15	15	12	60	63	−3	45	

Source: World Football
Rules for classification: 1) Points; 2) Goal difference; 3) Goals scored
Notes:

19 August 1978 1	Arsenal	2–2	Leeds United	London
				Stadium: Highbury

22 August 1978 2	Manchester City	1–1	Arsenal	Manchester
				Stadium: Maine Road

26 August 1978 3	Everton	1–0	Arsenal	Liverpool
				Stadium: Goodison Park

2 September 1978 4	Arsenal	5–1	Queen's Park Rangers	London
				Stadium: Highbury

9 September 1978 5	Nottingham Forest	2–1	Arsenal	Nottingham
				Stadium: City Ground

16 September 1978 6	Arsenal	1–0	Bolton Wanderers	London
				Stadium: Highbury

23 September 1978 7	Arsenal	1–1	Manchester United	London
				Stadium: Highbury

30 September 1978 8	Middlesbrough	2–3	Arsenal	Middlesbrough
				Stadium: Ayresome Park

7 October 1978 9	Arsenal	1–1	Aston Villa	London
				Stadium: Highbury

14 October 1978 10	Wolverhampton Wanderers	1–0	Arsenal	Wolverhampton
				Stadium: Molineux

21 October 1978 11	Arsenal	1–0	Southampton	London
				Stadium: Highbury

28 October 1978 12	Bristol City	1–3	Arsenal	Bristol
				Stadium: Ashton Gate

4 November 1978 13	Arsenal	4–1	Ipswich Town	London
				Stadium: Highbury

11 November 1978 14	Leeds United	0–1	Arsenal	Leeds
				Stadium: Elland Road

18 November 1978 15	Arsenal	2–2	Everton	London
				Stadium: Highbury

25 November 1978 16	Coventry City	1–1	Arsenal	Coventry
				Stadium: Highfield Road

2 December 1978 17	Arsenal	1–0	Liverpool	London
				Stadium: Highbury

9 December 1978 18	Norwich City	0–0	Arsenal	Norwich
				Stadium: Carrow Road

16 December 1978 19	Arsenal	2–0	Derby County	London
				Stadium: Highbury

23 December 1978 20	Tottenham Hotspur	0–5	Arsenal	London
				Stadium: White Hart Lane

26 December 1978 21	Arsenal	1–2	West Bromwich Albion	London
				Stadium: Highbury

30 December 1978 22	Arsenal	3–1	Birmingham City	London
				Stadium: Highbury

13 January 1979 23	Arsenal	2–1	Nottingham Forest	London
				Stadium: Highbury

3 February 1979 24	Manchester United	0–2	Arsenal	Manchester
				Stadium: Old Trafford

10 February 1979 25	Arsenal	0–0	Middlesbrough	London
				Stadium: Highbury

13 February 1979 26	Queen's Park Rangers	1–2	Arsenal	London
				Stadium: Loftus Road

24 February 1979 27	Arsenal	0–1	Wolverhampton Wanderers	London
				Stadium: Highbury

3 March 1979 28	Southampton	2–0	Arsenal	Southampton
				Stadium: The Dell

10 March 1979 29	Arsenal	2–0	Bristol City	London
				Stadium: Highbury

17 March 1979 30	Ipswich Town	2–0	Arsenal	Ipswich Town
				Stadium: Portman Road

24 March 1979 31	Arsenal	1–1	Manchester City	London
				Stadium: Highbury

26 March 1979 32	Bolton Wanderers	4–2	Arsenal	Bolton
				Stadium: Burnden Park

3 April 1979 33	Arsenal	1–1	Coventry City	London
				Stadium: Highbury

7 April 1979 34	Liverpool	3–0	Arsenal	Liverpool
				Stadium: Anfield

10 April 1979 35	Arsenal	1–0	Tottenham Hotspur	London
				Stadium: Highbury

14 April 1979 36	West Bromwich Albion	1–1	Arsenal	West Bromwich
				Stadium: The Hawthorns

16 April 1979 37	Arsenal	5–2	Chelsea	London
				Stadium: Highbury

21 April 1979 38	Derby County	2–0	Arsenal	Derby
				Stadium: Baseball Ground

25 April 1979 39	Aston Villa	5–1	Arsenal	Birmingham
				Stadium: Villa Park

28 April 1979 40	Arsenal	1–1	Norwich City	London
				Stadium: Highbury

5 May 1979 41	Birmingham City	0–0	Arsenal	Birmingham
				Stadium: St Andrew's

19 May 1979 42	Chelsea	1–1	Arsenal	London
				Stadium: Stamford Bridge

=== Football League Cup ===
29 August 1978 Second round	Rotherham United	3–1	Arsenal	Rotherham
				Stadium: Millmoor

=== FA Cup ===
Arsenal entered the FA Cup in the third round proper, in which they were drawn to face Sheffield Wednesday.

6 January 1979 Third round	Sheffield Wednesday	1–1	Arsenal	Sheffield
	Johnson		Sunderland	Stadium: Hillsborough Stadium

9 January 1979 Third round replay	Arsenal	1–1	Sheffield Wednesday	London
	Brady		Wylde	Stadium: Highbury

15 January 1979 Third round 2nd replay	Sheffield Wednesday	2–2 (aet)	Arsenal	Leicester
	Hornsby (2, 1 pen)		Brady; Sunderland	Stadium: Filbert Street

17 January 1979 Third round 3rd replay	Arsenal	3–3 (aet)	Sheffield Wednesday	Leicester
	Stapleton (2); Young		Rushbury; Lowey; Hornsby (pen)	Stadium: Filbert Street

22 January 1979 Third round 4th replay	Sheffield Wednesday	0–2	Arsenal	Leicester
			Gatting; Stapleton	Stadium: Filbert Street

27 January 1979 Fourth round	Arsenal	2–0	Notts County	London
	Talbot; Young			Stadium: Highbury

26 February 1979 Fifth round	Nottingham Forest	0–1	Arsenal	Nottingham
			Stapleton 78'	Stadium: City Ground

19 March 1979 Sixth round	Southampton	1–1	Arsenal	Southampton
	Hayes		Price	Stadium: The Dell

21 March 1979 Sixth round replay	Arsenal	2–0	Southampton	London
	Sunderland 32', 75'			Stadium: Highbury

31 March 1979 Semi-Final	Arsenal	2–0	Wolverhampton Wanderers	Birmingham
	Stapleton 50'; Sunderland 79'			Stadium: Villa Park

12 May 1979 Final	Arsenal	3–2	Manchester United	London
	Talbot 12'; Stapleton 43'; Sunderland 89'		McQueen 86'; McIlroy 88'	Stadium: Wembley Stadium; Attendance: 100,000

=== UEFA Cup ===
13 September 1978 First round (1st Leg)	Arsenal (England)	3–0	(East Germany) Lokomotive Leipzig	London
				Stadium: Highbury

27 September 1978 First round (2nd Leg)	Lokomotive Leipzig (East Germany)	1–4 (1–7 agg.)	(England) Arsenal	Leipzig
				Stadium: Bruno-Plache-Stadion

18 October 1978 Second round (1st Leg)	Hajduk Split (Socialist Federal Republic of Yugoslavia)	2–1	(England) Arsenal	Split
				Stadium: Plinara Stadion

1 November 1978 Second round (2nd Leg)	Arsenal (England)	1–0 (2–2 agg.)	(Socialist Federal Republic of Yugoslavia) Hajduk Split	London
				Stadium: Highbury

22 November 1978 Third Round (1st Leg)	Red Star Belgrade (Socialist Federal Republic of Yugoslavia)	1–0	(England) Arsenal	Belgrade
				Stadium: Red Star Stadium

6 December 1978 Third Round (2nd Leg)	Arsenal (England)	1–1 (1–2 agg.)	(Socialist Federal Republic of Yugoslavia) Red Star Belgrade	London
				Stadium: Highbury

== Top scorers ==
=== First Division ===
- (Republic of Ireland) Frank Stapleton 17
- (Republic of Ireland) Liam Brady 13
- (England) Alan Sunderland 9
