= David Pryde =

David Pryde may refer to:

- David Pryde (footballer), Scottish footballer
- David Pryde (politician), Scottish politician

== See also ==
- D. P. B. Pride (David Porter Baker Pride), American attorney and politician
