= Edward Wallington =

Edward Wallington may refer to:

- Ernie Wallington (Edward Ernest Wallington, 1895–1959), English footballer
- Edward Wallington (courtier) (1854–1933), English cricketer, colonial administrator and a of the British Royal Household
