= Roger Davidson =

Roger Davidson may refer to:

- Roger Davidson (footballer) (born 1948), English footballer
- Roger Davidson (rugby union) (1869–1955), Scottish rugby union player
