= George Burrell =

George Burrell may refer to:

- George Burrell (footballer) (1892–?), English footballer
- George Burrell (rugby union) (1921–2001), Scotland rugby union player, referee and administrator
- George Burrell (British Army officer) (1777–1853)
- George Burrell (American football) (born 1948), American football player
