= George Dering Wolff =

American editor

- Born: August 25, 1822; Martinsburg, West Virginia, U.S.
- Died: January 29, 1894; Norristown, Pennsylvania, U.S.

George Dering Wolff was an American Protestant minister, later after a conversion an editor of Catholic publications.

== Life ==
His parents were Charlotte Wolff, and Bernard Crouse Wolff (b. at Martinsburg, 1794), a prominent theologian of the German Reformed Church (Lutheran). The family moved to Easton, Pennsylvania, in 1835, the father becoming English pastor there.

George graduated A.M. from Marshall College, Mercersburg, Pennsylvania, and there studied law for three years at Easton. Though admitted to the Bar, he never practised, but after a four years' theological course became a minister of the German Reformed Church. The elder Wolff and his son were staunch followers of John Williamson Nevin, who in 1843 began to develop in their sect a system of theology which, whilst strongly opposing Catholicism, held Christ's Church to be a living organism and sought to restore what they held to be teachings of Christ repudiated by the Protestant Reformation (see G. D. Wolff's article "The Mercersburg Movement" in "American Catholic Quarterly", 1878).

George Wolff joined the Catholic Church in 1871. The next year he became editor of the Catholic Mirror published at Baltimore, leaving it the year following for the Catholic Standard of Philadelphia, of which he died editor-in-chief. His editorial success caused him to be called to join James A. Corcoran and James O'Connor in establishing the American Catholic Quarterly Review, first issued in Philadelphia, January 1876. O'Connor was consecrated bishop in August of that year, and went to his vicariate Apostolic in Nebraska. The other two editors sustained the publication until their death. Wolff's articles were largely on matters of apologetic theology. His wife, Sarah Hill, became a convert to Catholicism, as did his brother, Christian Wolff.

== Articles ==
- "Modern Physicists and the Origin of Man," The American Catholic Quarterly Review, Vol. I, January/October 1876.
- "The Mercersburg Movement," The American Catholic Quarterly Review, Vol. III, 1878.
- "Socialistic Communism in the United States," The American Catholic Quarterly Review, Vol. III, 1878.
- "Catholicity and Protestantism in Relation to Our Future as a People," The American Catholic Quarterly Review, Vol. IV, Jan./Oct. 1879.
- "Gladstone's Latest Blunder," The American Catholic Quarterly Review, Vol. VI, 1881.
- "Michael Davitt's Scheme for Nationalizing the Land," The American Catholic Quarterly Review, Vol. VII, 1882.
- "What Did 'The Reformation' Reform," The American Catholic Quarterly Review, Vol. IX, 1884.
- "The Wage Question," The American Catholic Quarterly Review, Vol. XI, 1886.
- "The Railroad and Kindred Monopolies," The American Catholic Quarterly Review, Vol. XI, 1886.
- "The Proposed Revision of the Westminster Cathecism," The American Catholic Quarterly Review, Vol. XV, January/October 1890.
- "In Memorian of the Right Rev. James O'Connor," The American Catholic Quarterly Review, Vol. XV, January/October 1890.
- "Our Parochial School System," The American Catholic Quarterly Review, Vol. XVII, 1892.
