= James Quayle =

James Quayle may refer to:

- Dan Quayle (James Danforth Quayle, born 1947), 44th Vice President of the United States
- James C. Quayle (1921–2000), American newspaper publisher
- James Quayle (footballer) (1890–1936), English footballer
