= Harry Ross =

Scottish footballer

Personal information
- Full name: Henry Ross
- Date of birth: 4 April 1881
- Place of birth: Brechin, Scotland
- Date of death: 1953 (aged 71 or 72)
- Place of death: Brechin, Scotland
- Height: 5 ft 10 in (1.78 m)
- Position: Full back

Senior career*
Years	Team	Apps	(Gls)
- Lochee Harp
1899–1904	Burnley	106	(2)
1904–1908	Fulham	29	(3)
1908–1909	St Mirren	9	(0)
1910–1911	Brechin City	7	(?)
- * Club domestic league appearances and goals

Henry Ross (4 April 1881 – 1953) was a Scottish professional footballer who played as a full back. He had moved from Junior football in Dundee to play for Burnley but his major triumphs were with Fulham, then a Southern League club, which he joined in 1904. He played ninety eight games, mainly at right back, for Fulham between 1904 and 1908 and scored a total of nine goals.

Fulham had appointed Harry Bradshaw as manager in 1904 and "Bradshaw's teams were built around a wonderful defence in which the consistent and highly regarded Fryer was supported by two Harrys at full back, Ross and Thorpe." He was described in 1905 as "one of those players who can play equally well at right or left back. Physically he is the man for the place. Twenty four years of age, he weighs over thirteen stone and stands a trifle more than five feet ten. He is a vigorous tackler and a powerful kick, and possesses all the attributes of mind and temper that go to make a first class player.".

Ross played for the 'Anglo-Scots' in an international trial in 1906 Fulham entered the English Football League in 1907 and Ross captained them in 1907–08; In that season he had been carried shoulder high from the field, the hero of the hour, after Fulham had defeated Manchester United in a cup tie. From Fulham he moved back to Scotland with St Mirren and then signed for Brechin City, playing his first game on 29 October 1910 against Aberdeen A. Ross played seven games for Brechin City in season 1910–11.
