= George Wolff =

George or Georg Wolff may refer to:

- Georg Wolff (merchant) (1736–1828), Norwegian businessman and Danish consul in London
- Georg Wolff (journalist) (1914–1996), German paramilitary office and journalist
- George W. Wolff (1848–1919), politician in Wisconsin
- George Dering Wolff (1822–1894), American Protestant minister, later after a conversion an editor of Catholic publications

== See also ==
- George Wolf (1777–1840), governor of Pennsylvania
- George Wolfe (disambiguation)
