= George Wolfe =

George Wolfe may refer to:

- George C. Wolfe (born 1954), African-American playwright and director
- George Wolfe (Irish politician) (1860–1941), Irish Cumann na nGaedhael TD 1923–1932
- George Wolfe (CPA), US government administrator in Iraq
- George Wolfe (cartoonist) (1911–1993), American cartoonist
- George Wolfe (footballer) (1878–1958), English footballer

== See also ==
- George Wolf (1777–1840), governor of the U.S. state of Pennsylvania
- George Wolff (disambiguation)
