= Jack McBean (footballer) =

Scottish footballer

- With Royal Ordnance Factories in 1894

Senior career*
Years	Team	Apps	(Gls)
1889–1893	Royal Arsenal	6	(0)
1893–????	Royal Ordnance Factories		
- * Club domestic league appearances and goals

Jack McBean was a Scottish amateur footballer who made 6 appearances for Royal Arsenal between 1889 and 1893. He had previously played in Scotland for Kirkcaldy Wanderers, alongside two other future Arsenal players, David Danskin and Peter Connolly. He later joined the newly founded Royal Ordnance Factories, along with a number of other ex-Arsenal players.
