= Emrys Ellis =

Welsh footballer

Personal information
- Date of birth: 29 June 1904
- Place of birth: Ruabon, Wales
- Date of death: 24 June 1981 (aged 77)
- Place of death: Rhostyllen, Wales
- Position: Left-half

Senior career*
| Years | Team | Apps | (Gls) |
| 1927–1930 | Nunhead | | |
- Oswestry Town

International career
| 1930–1931 | Wales | 3 | (0) |
- * Club domestic league appearances and goals

Emrys Ellis (29 June 1904 — 24 June 1981) was a Welsh international footballer.

== Career ==
Ellis was a school master by profession. He joined non-league Nunhead in 1927, winning the Isthmian League in the 1928–29 and 1929–30 seasons. He was part of the Wales national football team between 1930 and 1931, playing 3 matches. He played his first match on 25 October 1930 against Scotland as one of the so-called Unknowns and his last match on 5 December 1931 against Northern Ireland. During his career, Ellis also played for Oswestry Town.

== Honours ==
Nunhead

- Isthmian League: 1928–29, 1929–30

== See also ==
- List of Wales international footballers (alphabetical)
