= Erith F.C. =

19th-century English football club

Erith
- Full name: Erith Football Club
- Founded: 1886
- Dissolved: 1894
- Ground: Cricket Ground
- President: C. A. Streeton
- Secretary: Bernard Beard
Home colours

Erith Football Club was an association football club based in Erith, Kent, active in the 19th century.

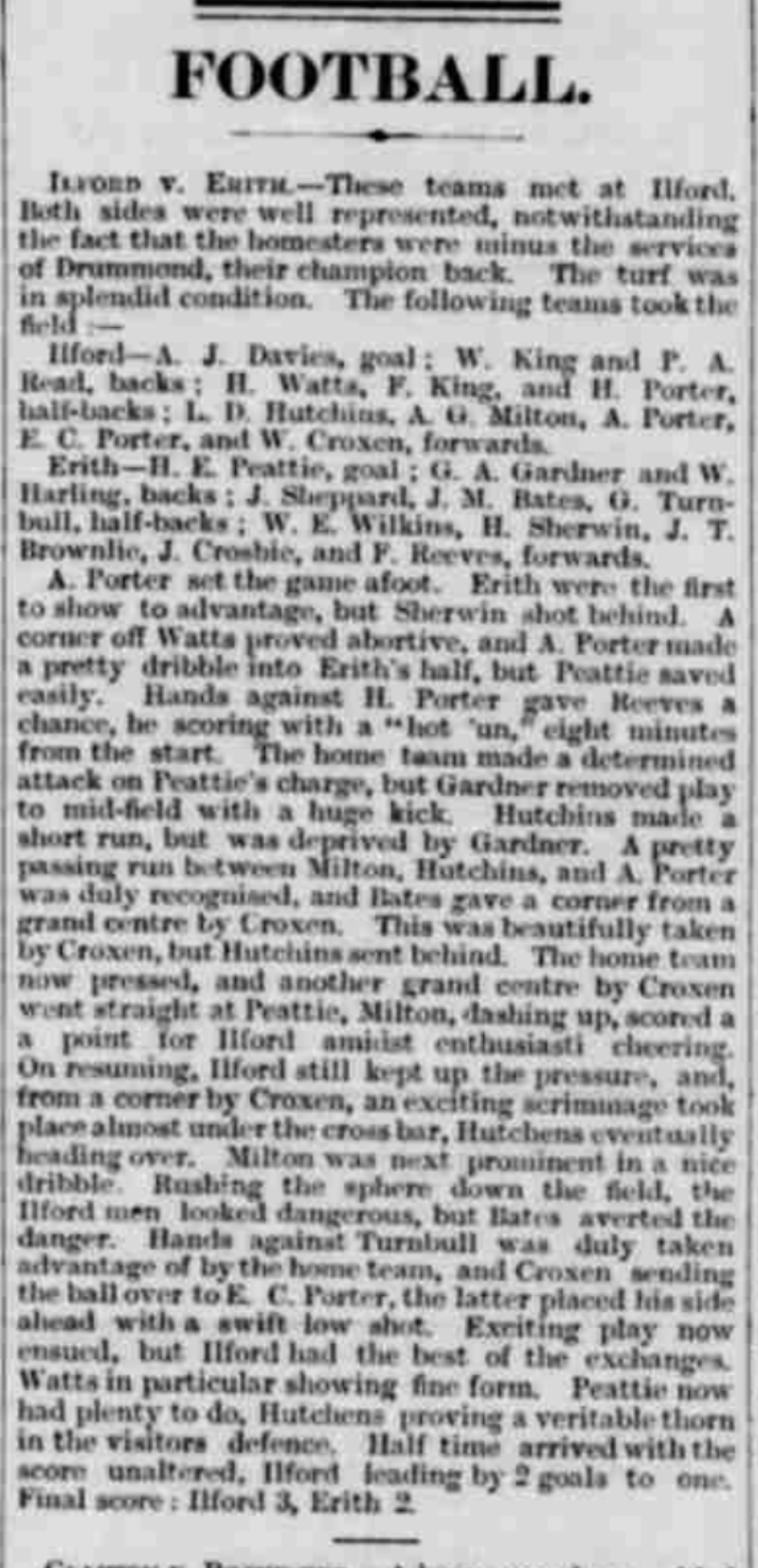
1892–93 FA Cup 1st qualifying round, Ilford 3–2 Erith, Leytonstone Express & Independent, 22 October 1892

== History ==
The first records for the club are from the 1886–87 season; indeed the club was the first opponent for the Royal Arsenal club (after its renaming from Dial Square), at Plumstead Common in January 1887, which the home side won 6–1.

In early 1892, a number of clubs in the south of England discussed the formation of a new league competition. Erith was one of the unsuccessful applicants, but one of the proposals was that the clubs with the fewest votes would take part in a subordinate competition. The main competition did not in fact take place, but seven of the "subordinate" clubs, including Erith, set up the Southern Alliance.

Erith had a significant boost before the 1892–93 season started, by taking over the Maxim-Nordenfelt club, and it joined the Football Association. Its league season was promising; although not every club played all 12 fixtures, Erith was second when the season ended, four points behind Old St Stephens (with one game in hand), but ahead of Tottenham Hotspur having played a game more - a 4–1 defeat at Old St Stephens in the final match played made Erith's last remaining match redundant.

The same season the club entered the FA Cup for the only time, but it lost 3–2 at Ilford in the first qualifying round.

However the Southern Alliance did not survive to the 1893–94 season; although the Southern Football League did belatedly start, there was no room for Erith. Without a league competition to join, and not having renewed its Football Association membership, Erith arranged a set of 29 friendly fixtures, with room for further fixtures. There was still some interest, with 2,500 attending an 8–3 home defeat to Dartford in October. However, before the end of the season, the club was dissolved; the reserve XI reconstituted itself as Erith Villa.

== Colours ==
The club played in blue and white shirts.

== Ground ==
The club played at the Erith Cricket Ground. In 1892 it moved to a new ground at Lower Road.

== Notable players ==
- J. M. Bates (former Arsenal player) was the club captain in 1892–93.
- Jimmy Meggs, another former Arsenal player who was also one of the founders of Royal Ordnance Factories F.C., who played for the club in its final season.
