= Southern Alliance =

- Founded: 1892
- Folded: 1893
- Country: England
- Number of clubs: 7

The Southern Alliance was a short-lived football league competition for teams in the South of England.

At the time, there were no Southern teams in the Football League and no equivalent competition existed for clubs in the south. John Oliver, a carpet manufacturer in the City of London was noted as being responsible for the formation of the Southern Alliance which was set up in 1892 and ran for just one season in 1892–93. The league featured seven leading amateur teams from the Home Counties, namely:

- Erith
- Old St Stephen's
- Polytechnic
- Slough
- Tottenham Hotspur
- Upton Park
- Windsor & Eton

Notable in their absence were leading Southern sides such as Woolwich Arsenal (who had turned professional in 1891 and were banned from local competitions) and Millwall Athletic.

== Final table ==
Not all matches in the 1892-93 competition were played, however Old St. Stephens topped the final table. The competition was disbanded at the end of the season.

		P	W	D	L	F	A	Pts
1	Old St Stephen's	12	10	1	1	44	15	21
2	Erith	11	8	1	2	29	14	17
3	Tottenham Hotspur	12	7	2	3	29	21	16
4	Polytechnic	8	4	0	4	18	12	8
5	Slough	11	2	2	7	21	33	6
6	Windsor & Eton	10	2	1	7	14	37	5
7	Upton Park	10	1	0	9	7	36	2

- Noted in Tottenham Hotspur The Official Illustrated by Phil Soar Slough played Upton Park on 29 April and Windsor played Polytechnic on 23 April however the results of those games have not been record.

== See also ==
- Southern Football League, a successor competition founded in 1894
