= Jack Humble =

- Jack Humble, circa 1914.
- Born: John Wilkinson Humble; 1862; Hartburn, County Durham
- Died: 18 December 1931 (aged 68–69)
- Occupations: Factory worker, football club director
- Known for: Founder & club director of Arsenal

John Wilkinson Humble (1862 – 1931) was an English football player and club director, who was one of the principal founders of Arsenal Football Club.

== Biography ==
Humble was born in Hartburn, County Durham, but moved to London in 1880 to work at the Royal Arsenal, in a somewhat unusual manner; he and his brother walked the 400-mile journey south from their home village to the capital, which made headlines in the local newspapers back home. A staunchly left-wing man and a member of local socialist parties, he strongly believed in workers' rights and campaigned for shorter working hours and more time for leisure activities, which included football, a passion of his.

Humble met several other football fanatics, such as David Danskin, Fred Beardsley and Morris Bates at the Royal Arsenal and in 1886 became one of the founding members of Dial Square Football Club, who were soon renamed Royal Arsenal, and would eventually become the club known today as Arsenal. Royal Arsenal soon became one of the strongest amateur sides in Southern England. Humble played for Royal Arsenal during 1887-88 and 1888–89, mainly as a full-back or half-back.

Humble's biggest contribution to Arsenal was his successful drive to turn the club professional. In 1891 Derby County tried to recruit two of Royal Arsenal's players after an FA Cup match between the clubs; Humble and Danskin realised that the club would be unable to survive if its players were being continually tempted away. Therefore, at the club's 1891 AGM, Humble proposed the club turn professional; however with his socialist views, he baulked at turning the club into a limited liability company at the same time, declaring: "The club [has been] carried on by working men and it is my ambition to see it carried on by them."

The rest of the London footballing world, dominated by an ethos of amateurism, quickly shunned Woolwich Arsenal (as the club had been renamed); they were expelled from the London Football Association. Boycotted by other sides, Arsenal could well have gone bankrupt, but in 1893 Humble's decision was vindicated as they were invited to join the Football League, making them the first southern club to become a League member. By this time Humble had become a full director of the club, having reluctantly accepted the club's need to become a commercial company in 1893.

Humble would remain a director of the club for over thirty years, during which time they moved to Arsenal Stadium in Highbury, north London and became known simple as "Arsenal". He continued to work at the Royal Arsenal as a gun inspector, and spent World War I seconded in Sheffield and then Norway.

He was the last original founding member to have a formal connection with Arsenal, and over time became the club's unofficial historian by virtue of being there longer than anyone else. In 1929, however, he was forced to resign from the Arsenal board in the same financial scandal which brought down chairman Sir Henry Norris; Norris had used the club's expenses account for his own use, and had personally profited from the sale of the team bus. Although Humble himself was entirely innocent of any charges, the Football Association ruled that as a director he should have scrutinised Norris's financial dealings more closely, and suspended him from football.

Humble was still alive to witness Arsenal's FA Cup win of 1930. He died in December 1931, aged 69.
