= The American Catholic Quarterly Review =

US magazine (1876–1924)

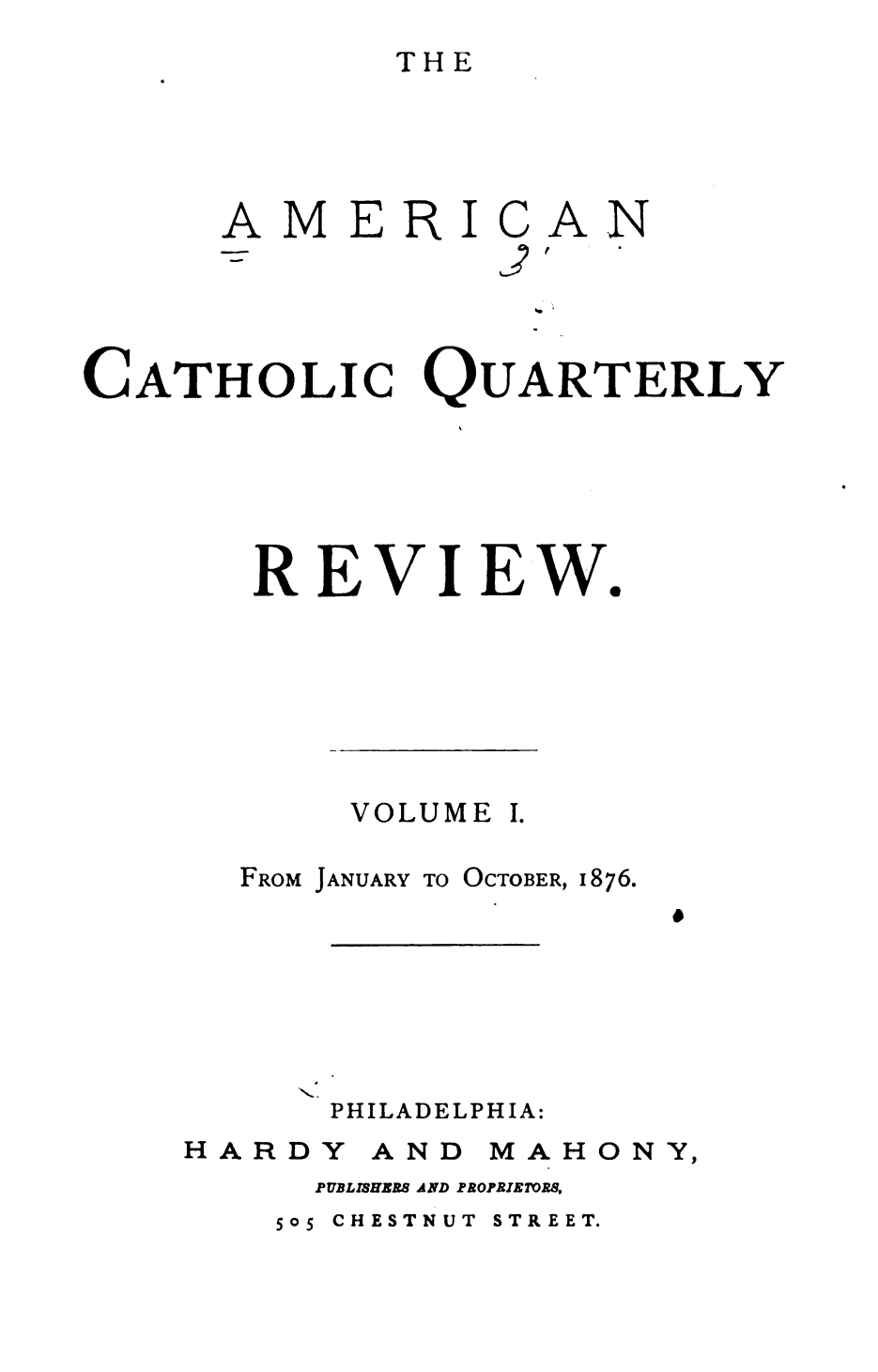
- Title page of the first edition.
- Categories: Art, culture, literature
- Frequency: Quarterly
- First issue: 1876 (150 years ago)
- Final issue: 1924 (102 years ago)
- Country: United States
- Based in: Philadelphia, Pennsylvania
- Language: English

The American Catholic Quarterly Review was an American quarterly magazine of literature, politics, culture, religion, and the arts, founded in 1876 by James A. Corcoran and Herman J. Heuser. The journal was conceived as a forum for public discussion and a tool for elite education. The magazine ceased publication in 1924.

== Notable contributors ==
- Orestes Brownson
- Giovanni Battista de Rossi
- James Gibbons
- Isaac Hecker
- John Keane
- Patrick Neeson Lynch
- Henry Edward Manning
- St. George Jackson Mivart
- James O'Connor
- Patrick John Ryan
- Charles Seghers
- John Gilmary Shea
- John L. Spalding
- George Tyrrell

== See also ==
- Lists of magazines
- Media in Philadelphia
