= Morris Bates =

English footballer

Personal information
- Full name: Joseph Morris Bates
- Date of birth: 22 May 1864
- Place of birth: Nottingham, England
- Date of death: 6 September 1905 (aged 41)
- Place of death: Woolwich, London, England
- Position: Full-back

Senior career*
Years	Team	Apps	(Gls)
	Nottingham Forest	0	(0)
1886–1890	Royal Arsenal	0	(0)
1892–93	Erith		
- * Club domestic league appearances and goals

Joseph Morris Bates (22 May 1864 – 6 September 1905), usually known as Morris Bates, was an English footballer.

Bates first played as an amateur for Nottingham Forest, before moving south to London to take up work at the Royal Arsenal in Woolwich (along with former teammate Fred Beardsley). There, he met several other keen football fans, including Jack Humble and David Danskin, and together they formed Dial Square Football Club in 1886; the club were soon renamed Royal Arsenal, and are today known simply as Arsenal. Bates continued to officiate as an umpire at some of Forest's games; with Fred Beardsley, he was responsible for obtaining a set of red kit from their old club Forest, giving Arsenal the colours they still wear.

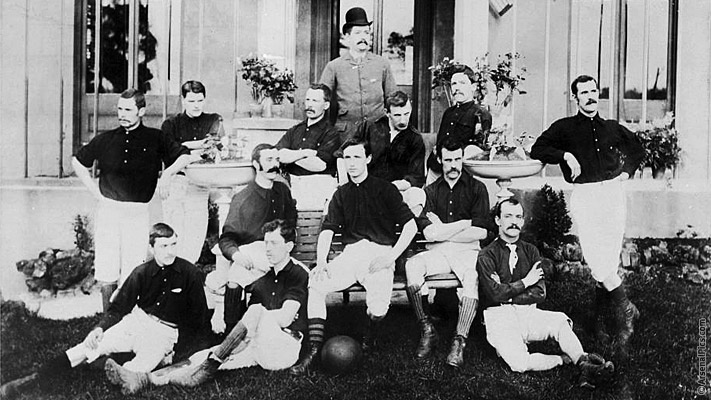
Arsenal's squad for the 1888–89 season. Bates is shown behind the bench, third from the right, leaning on it and looking down.

Bates played 73 first-team matches for Royal Arsenal, mainly as a full-back, in the FA Cup (including the Gunners' very first FA Cup tie, against Lyndhurst on 5 October 1889) and various regional competitions. Bates went on to become Arsenal's captain and earned the nickname "The Iron Man", with a reputation for his powerful heading of the ball, in an era when footballs were far heavier and more dangerous to head than they are now. He skippered Arsenal to their first trophy wins – the Kent Senior Cup and London Charity Cup in 1890.

Bates was 36 by the time of the cup wins and decided he was getting too old for the game; he quit playing for the Royal Arsenal first team in the summer of 1890. Unlike Beardsley or Danskin, he did not maintain his association with the club after retiring, as no mention of him is made in subsequent records, and he reverted to amateur football by captaining the Erith club in 1892–93. He continued to work at the Royal Arsenal, specialising in Maxim guns, until his death from tuberculosis at 41.
