= John Chenhall =

English footballer

Personal information
- Full name: John Colin Chenhall
- Date of birth: 23 July 1927
- Place of birth: Bristol, England
- Date of death: April 2011 (aged 83)
- Place of death: Bristol, England
- Position: Full back

Senior career*
Years	Team	Apps	(Gls)
- Maidenhead United
1944–1953	Arsenal	16	(0)
1945	→ Boston United (loan)	1	(0)
1953–1958	Fulham	91	(0)
1958–????	Guildford City		
- * Club domestic league appearances and goals

John Colin Chenhall (23 July 1927 - April 2011) was an English footballer.

Having initially played for Maidenhead United, Chenhall signed for Arsenal as an amateur in October 1944, turning professional in November 1945. During his early career, like all able-bodied men of his age, Chenhall was obliged to do National Service and he trained at HMS Royal Arthur in Skegness; during his time there he played a single match on loan for Boston United.

Mainly a reserve player at Arsenal, he did not make his first-team debut until 20 October 1951, against Charlton Athletic, a match Arsenal won 3–1. Chenhall made three appearances that season, and thirteen in 1952-53 as a deputy for Lionel Smith, enough to earn a medal as Arsenal won the First Division title.

Chenhall left Arsenal in July 1953 and moved to Fulham having played 16 matches in total for Arsenal. He stayed at Fulham for four seasons, playing 91 matches in total, and saw out his career at Guildford City.

== Honours ==
- First Division: 1952-53
