= David Danskin =

Scottish footballer (1863–1948)

Personal information
- Date of birth: 9 January 1863
- Place of birth: Burntisland, Fife, Scotland
- Date of death: 4 August 1948 (aged 85)
- Place of death: Warwick, England

Senior career*
Years	Team	Apps	(Gls)
- Kirkcaldy Wanderers
1886–1889	Royal Arsenal		
- * Club domestic league appearances and goals

David Danskin (9 January 1863 – 4 August 1948) was a Scottish mechanical engineer and footballer. He was a principal founding member of Dial Square F.C., later renamed Royal Arsenal, the team that are today known as Arsenal.

== Career ==
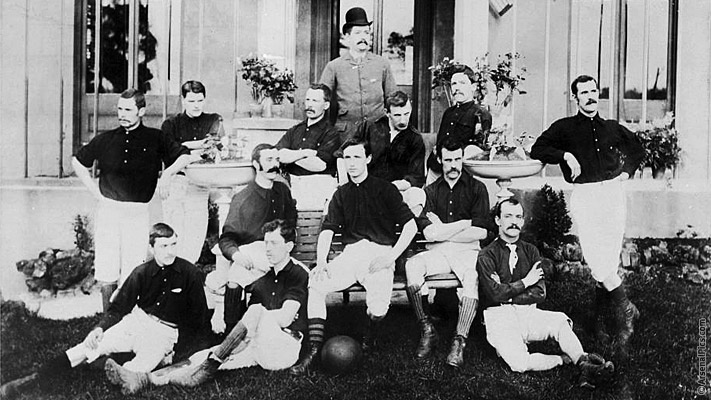
Arsenal's squad for the 1888–89 season. Danskin is seated on the right end of the bench with his arms folded.

Born in Burntisland, Fife, Scotland, Danskin grew up in Kirkcaldy. He played as an amateur for Kirkcaldy Wanderers, and among their players were Jack McBean and Peter Connolly, two players who would later join Danskin at Royal Arsenal. In 1885 Danskin moved to London to find work, and took a job at the Dial Square workshop at the Royal Arsenal in Woolwich. There he met several football enthusiasts, amongst them Jack Humble and former Nottingham Forest players Fred Beardsley and Morris Bates. Together with Humble, Danskin is generally credited as the driving force behind the formation of a works football team, Dial Square FC.

Danskin organised a whip-round amongst his fellow players and purchased Dial Square's first football, and captained the team in their very first match against Eastern Wanderers on 11 December 1886; Dial Square won 6–0. Danskin continued to play for Royal Arsenal, as the club were soon renamed afterwards, for the next two years. However, after an injury incurred in a match against Clapton in January 1889, Danskin elected to step down from the side and only played a few more rare occasions after that.

Arsenal turned professional in 1891, and although Danskin stood for election to the club's committee in 1892, he did not succeed in getting elected. He ended his official association with Arsenal and later became associated with a new works team from the area, Royal Ordnance Factories, which folded in circa 1896. He also officiated as a referee in local matches. He was still fond enough of Arsenal to attend their games, and his son Billy used to sell programmes at their Manor Ground as a child.

He later started up his own bicycle manufacturing business in Plumstead, before moving to Coventry in 1907 to work for the Standard Motor Company. In his later life he was troubled by ill-health, caused by injuries to his legs in his footballing days, and took early retirement. Nevertheless, he was one of the few founding members of Arsenal to live to see the club's rise to success in the 1930s; he reportedly cheered the side's 1936 FA Cup win from his sickbed, while listening to the radio commentary. After many years of ill-health, he died in a hospice in Warwick in 1948, at the age of 85 and was buried at London Road Cemetery in Coventry.

== Legacy ==
In 2007, to commemorate his role in the club's history, the Arsenal Scotland Supporters Club dedicated a blue plaque to Danskin, near his birthplace in Burntisland.

During Arsenal's 125th anniversary celebrations, two of David Danskin's great-grandchildren delivered the match ball for Arsenal's 1–0 victory over Everton at Emirates Stadium as Arsenal celebrated another milestone.

In April 2019, Arsenal Scotland Supporters Club arranged for a headstone to be erected at David Danskins grave in Coventry. The headstone was paid for by Arsenal FC with club managing director Vinai Venkatesham and coach and former captain Pat Rice joining Danskins descendant relatives and many Arsenal supporters for a graveside ceremony in his honour.

== See also ==
- History of Arsenal F.C. (1886–1966)
