= Ernie Tuckett =

English footballer

Personal information
- Date of birth: 1914
- Place of birth: Markse, England
- Date of death: 27 May 1945 (aged 30–31)
- Position: Inside forward

Senior career*
Years	Team	Apps	(Gls)
- Redcar Westfield
- Guisborough Brigantes
- Scarborough
1932–1937	Arsenal		
1934	→ Margate (loan)		
1937–1938	Bradford City	13	(4)
1938–1945	Fulham		
- → Bradford City (war guest)
1940	→ Redcar Albion (war guest)		
- * Club domestic league appearances and goals

Ernest William Tuckett (1914 – 27 May 1945) was an English professional footballer who played as an inside forward.

== Career ==
Born in Marske, Tuckett spent his early career with Redcar Westfield, Guisborough Brigantes, Scarborough, Arsenal and Margate. He joined Arsenal as an 18-year-old amateur in June 1932, turning professional in March 1936 after a spell with nursery club Margate in 1934.

He joined Bradford City from Arsenal in February 1937, in exchange for Laurie Scott. He made 13 league and 1 FA Cup appearances for the club, before moving to Fulham in April 1938. He returned to Bradford City during World War Two, briefly guesting for Redcar Albion near his hometown of Marske on Christmas Day in 1940, before dying in an airfield accident on 27 May 1945 when serving as a corporal in the Royal Air Force.

== Sources ==
- Frost, Terry (1988). Bradford City A Complete Record 1903-1988. Breedon Books Sport. ISBN 0-907969-38-0.
