= William Vaughan (footballer) =

English footballer

Personal information
- Full name: William Vaughan
- Date of birth: 18 December 1898
- Place of birth: Willenhall, West Midlands, England
- Date of death: 1976 (aged 77–78)
- Position: Inside left

Senior career*
Years	Team	Apps	(Gls)
1919–1920	Willenhall		
1920–1921	Bristol Rovers	9	(1)
1921–1922	Stafford Rangers		
1922–1923	Merthyr Town		
1923–1924	Shrewsbury Town		
1924–1925	Wrexham	11	(2)
1925–1926	Bilston		
1926–1927	Burton Town		
1927–1928	Exeter City	33	(9)
1928–1929	Merthyr Town	9	(4)
1929	Luton Town	3	(2)
1929	Brierley Hill Alliance		
1929–1930	Gresley Rovers		
1930–1932	Bloxwich Strollers		
1932–1933	Cheltenham Town		
1933–1934	Walsall Wood		
1934	Winsford United		
1934	Knotty Ash Athletic		
- * Club domestic league appearances and goals

William Vaughan (18 December 1898 – 1976) was an English professional footballer who played as an inside left. He made appearances in the English Football League for Bristol Rovers, Wrexham, Exeter City, Merthyr Town and Luton Town. He also was a journeyman in football, playing for a total of 17 clubs across England and Wales throughout his 15-year career.
