= Nunhead F.C. =

Nunhead
- Full name: Nunhead Football Club
- Nickname: The Nuns
- Founded: 1888
- Dissolved: 1949
- Ground: Brown's Ground, Nunhead
Home colours	Away colours

Nunhead Football Club was an English football club from Nunhead, Greater London. The club was prominent in southern English non-league football prior to World War II, but ceased all playing activities at the end of the 1940–41 season, and formally folded in 1949.

== History ==
Founded as Wingfield House in 1888, the club won the Southern Suburban League Division One in 1903, becoming a senior team in the process. In 1904, the club changed its name to Nunhead, after merging with Honour Oak.

The 1920s and 1930s were probably the most successful period in the club's history, with the team winning the London Senior Cup in 1923 and the Isthmian League championship twice in successive seasons in 1928–29 and 1929–30.

During the 1926–27 season, Nunhead reached the FA Cup second round, losing 2–1 to Poole. The campaign was also notable for Nunhead setting a record for the highest margin of victory by a non-league side in an FA Cup round proper match when they beat Kingstonian 9–0 in the first round. In the 1931–32 season Nunhead were on the receiving end of that same nine goal margin of victory record when they lost 9–0 in the FA Cup first round to Bath City.

In the mid-1930s Denis Compton played for the club. He would go on to play for Arsenal and England.

The Second World War, the termination by the landlords of the club's lease on Brown's Ground, and other financial difficulties led to the end of the club. Day-to-day operations and all playing activities ceased at the end of the 1940–41 season, with the club surviving only on paper until 1949 when they officially resigned from the Football Association and folded.

In 2019, 80 years after the club had folded, a group of Nunhead residents began fundraising for charity in the name of Nunhead Football Club. To celebrate the 90th anniversary of Nunhead's consecutive Isthmian League title wins, a visual archive of the club's history was published online.

== Ground ==
Whilst still known as Wingfield House, the club played at Wavertree Road in Streatham Hill. In 1904, Nunhead moved to Forest Hill to play at the Ivy Ground, before settling at Brown's Ground, formerly used by Southern United, in Nunhead upon election to the Isthmian League in 1908.

The site of the club's ground now forms part of the playing fields of the Haberdashers' Aske's Federation. As late as the early 1980s the old football club's dressing rooms were used by the Haberdashers' Aske's Boys School where they were affectionately referred to as the "Cowsheds".

== Notable former players ==
- (England) Albert Cadwell
- (England) Denis Compton
- (Wales) Emrys Ellis - Ellis is the only player ever to win international honours while with Nunhead. Ellis made his debut as one of 'The Unknowns' to face Scotland at Ibrox in 1930. The team was so-called because English Football League clubs refused to release their Welsh players for the fixture and so players with Welsh clubs were drafted in. Nine of the starting XI made their international debuts in the match, under the captaincy of Fred Keenor. They held the strong Scottish team to a remarkable 1-1 draw. Ellis retained his place for the following match against England at The Racecourse, a 0-4 defeat. Ellis later won a third and final cap in 1932 having since moved to Oswestry FC.
- (England) Les Henley
- (England) Sidney Pugh
- (England) Norman Sidey

== Honours ==
- Isthmian League
  - Champions: 1928–29, 1929–30
  - Runners-up: 1913–14, 1919–20, 1922–23, 1936–37
- London Senior Cup
  - Winners: 1923
- Surrey Senior Cup
  - Winners: 1908
  - Runners-up: 1930
