= Sid Pugh =

English footballer

Personal information
- Full name: Sidney James Pugh
- Date of birth: 10 October 1919
- Place of birth: Dartford, England
- Date of death: 15 April 1944 (aged 24)
- Place of death: Admaston, England
- Position: Half back

Youth career
- Nunhead
- Margate
- 1936–1938: Arsenal

Senior career*
Years	Team	Apps	(Gls)
1938–1944	Arsenal	1	(0)
1940	→ Bradford City (war guest)	1	(0)
1940	→ Chelsea (war guest)	1	(0)
Total		3	(0)
- * Club domestic league appearances and goals

Sidney James Pugh (10 October 1919 – 15 April 1944) was an English professional footballer who played as a half back.

== Career ==
Pugh was born in Dartford, and spent his early career with Nunhead and Margate. He joined Arsenal in April 1936 and turned professional two years later, making one appearance for them in the Football League in April 1939. Pugh suffered a kidney injury in that match and never played for Arsenal again. Pugh made one appearance as a wartime guest for Chelsea on 6 April 1940, and another for Bradford City in September 1940. Pugh joined the Royal Air Force afterwards and was undergoing training as a Flying Officer at RAF Seighford when he died in a plane crash near Admaston, Staffordshire, on 15 April 1944, and was buried at Llanharan Cemetery, Glamorganshire, Wales.
