= William Paterson (goalkeeper) =

Scottish association footballer

Willie Paterson
Personal information
- Full name: William Paterson
- Date of birth: 16 September 1902
- Place of birth: Dunfermline, Scotland
- Height: 6 ft 3 in (1.91 m)
- Position: Goalkeeper

Senior career*
Years	Team	Apps	(Gls)
–	Rosyth Bungalow City		
–	Broomhall Swifts		
1920–1925	Dunfermline Athletic	110	(0)
1921	→ Clydebank (loan)		
1924–1925	→ Boston Soccer Club (loan)	21	(0)
1925–1928	Dundee United	77	(0)
1928–1929	Arsenal	15	(0)
1929–1932	Airdrieonians	111	(0)
Total		334	(0)
- * Club domestic league appearances and goals

William Paterson (born 16 September 1902) was a Scottish footballer who played as a goalkeeper for Dunfermline Athletic, Boston Soccer Club, Dundee United, Arsenal and Airdrieonians.
