= Alfred Crowe =

English footballer

Personal information
- Full name: Alfred Squire Crowe
- Date of birth: 21 October 1883
- Place of birth: North Woolwich, England
- Date of death: 1957 (aged 73–74)
- Position: Centre forward

Senior career*
Years	Team	Apps	(Gls)
1903–1904	North Woolwich Invicta		
1904–1906	Woolwich Arsenal	6	(4)
Total		6	(4)
- * Club domestic league appearances and goals

Alfred Squire Crowe (5 July 1879–1957) was an English footballer who played in the Football League for Woolwich Arsenal.
