= Archie Low =

Scottish footballer

Personal information
- Full name: Archibald Buchanan Low
- Date of birth: 1885
- Place of birth: Forfar, Scotland
- Date of death: 1951 (aged 65–66)
- Position: Wing half

Senior career*
Years	Team	Apps	(Gls)
1905–1906	Ashfield		
1906–1907	Woolwich Arsenal	3	(0)
1908–1909	Partick Thistle		
1909	Johnstone		
Total		3	(0)
- * Club domestic league appearances and goals

Archibald Buchanan Low (1885–1951) was a Scottish footballer who played in the Football League for Woolwich Arsenal.
