= Tom Arnold (footballer) =

English footballer

Personal information
- Full name: Thomas Arnold
- Date of birth: 1878
- Place of birth: Coventry, England
- Position: Winger

Senior career*
Years	Team	Apps	(Gls)
1902–1903	Foleshill Great Heath		
1903–1904	Coventry City		
1905–1906	Arsenal	2	(0)
1906–1910	Coventry City		
Total		2	(0)
- * Club domestic league appearances and goals

Thomas Arnold (1878–unknown) was an English footballer who played in the Football League for Arsenal and Coventry City.

Arnold was a winger who moved from Coventry to Arsenal in May 1905 and made two first-team appearances later that year for the Gunners.

He returned to Coventry in 1907 and retired in 1911.
