= Sidney Cartwright =

English footballer

Personal information
- Date of birth: 16 July 1910
- Place of birth: Kiveton Park, England
- Date of death: 16 December 1988 (aged 78)
- Position: Half-back

Senior career*
Years	Team	Apps	(Gls)
- Kiveton Park
1935–1939	Arsenal	16	(2)
- * Club domestic league appearances and goals

Sidney Cartwright (16 July 1910 – 16 December 1988) was an English footballer who played for Arsenal. Arsenal won the old First Division in 1937–38 but he only made six league appearances all season.
