= Robert Evans (English footballer) =

English footballer

Personal information
- Full name: Robert Evans
- Place of birth: London, England
- Position: Right back

Senior career*
Years	Team	Apps	(Gls)
1912–1913	Woolwich Arsenal	1	(0)
1913–1918	Clapton Orient	0	(0)
- * Club domestic league appearances and goals

Robert Evans was an English amateur footballer who made one appearance in the Football League for Woolwich Arsenal as a right back.

== Personal life ==
Evans served as a private in the British Army in the Football Battalion of the Middlesex Regiment during the First World War.

== Career statistics ==
Appearances and goals by club, season and competition
Club	Season	League			FA Cup		Total	
Club	Season	Division	Apps	Goals	Apps	Goals	Apps	Goals
Woolwich Arsenal	1912–13	First Division	1	0	1	0	2	0
Career total			1	0	1	0	2	0
