= James Quayle (footballer) =

English footballer

Personal information
- Date of birth: 1890
- Place of birth: Charlton, London, England
- Date of death: 1936 (aged 45–46)
- Place of death: Detroit, USA
- Position: Left back

Senior career*
Years	Team	Apps	(Gls)
- Fossdene Old Boys
- Old Charlton
- Woolwich Polytechnic
1907–1908	Woolwich Arsenal	0	(0)
1908–1910	Northfleet		
1910	Woolwich Arsenal	1	(0)
- * Club domestic league appearances and goals

James A. Quayle (1890 – 1936) was an English footballer. He played at left-back.

He started his career as an amateur, with spells at local sides Old Charlton and Woolwich Polytechnic. He joined Woolwich Arsenal in 1907 but left after one season without playing a first-team game. He moved to Northfleet and served there for two seasons before turning professional and rejoining Woolwich Arsenal in October 1910. He made just one appearance for the club, as a deputy for Joe Shaw against The Wednesday on 12 November 1910. In the match, he was badly injured and had to be carried off; unable to play again his football career ended. Quayle joined the Shanghai Municipal Police in 1912, rising through the ranks and becoming a Superintendent in 1930. He died in Detroit while on leave in 1936.
