= Steve Brignall =

English footballer

Personal information
- Date of birth: 12 June 1960 (age 66)
- Place of birth: Tenterden, England
- Position: Defender

Senior career*
Years	Team	Apps	(Gls)
1978–1979	Arsenal	1	(0)
1980	Harstad IL		
–	Hastings United		
- * Club domestic league appearances and goals

Steve Brignall (born 12 June 1960) is an English former footballer who played in the Football League for Arsenal.
