= Peter Connolly (footballer) =

Scottish footballer

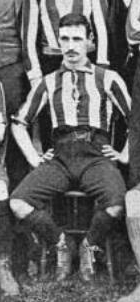
- With Royal Ordnance Factories in 1894

Personal information
- Date of birth: 1 January 1868
- Place of birth: Kirkcaldy, Fife, Scotland
- Date of death: 1 September 1895 (aged 27)
- Place of death: Kirkcaldy, Fife, Scotland
- Position: Forward/Full-Back

Senior career*
Years	Team	Apps	(Gls)
1887–1893	Royal Arsenal	129	(52)
1893–1894	Royal Ordnance Factories	0	(0)
- * Club domestic league appearances and goals

Peter Connolly (1 January 1868 – 1 September 1895) was a Scottish footballer who played for Royal Arsenal as a forward or full back, and later for Royal Ordnance Factories in 1893. After a successful career with both clubs, he died of tuberculosis in 1895. at the age of 27.

== Career ==
=== Arsenal ===
Peter Connolly is widely regarded as one of Royal Arsenal's best players during his time at the club. He made his debut against local rivals Tottenham Hotspur in a 6-2 victory, scoring 4 goals. He made 20 appearances in the 1888-89 season, scoring 19 goals in all competitions, and 13 goals in 7 competitive fixtures, finishing as top scorer for the club. following this season he moved into a more defensive fullback position, though over the next 2 seasons continued to play regularly, playing in 82 games and scoring another 12 goals in all friendlies and competitions for Arsenal, playing in this position for the club's very first FA Cup fixture. Whilst playing for Arsenal, he won the Kent Senior Cup, London Charity Cup, and finished runner's up in the London Senior Cup. In total he made 6 appearances in the FA Cup. In total he scored 52 goals in 129 appearances for the club.

=== Royal Ordnance Factory ===
In 1893, Connolly applied for, and had his professional status removed so that he could leave the Royal Arsenal and play for rival amateur side, Royal Ordnance Factories He won his second Kent Senior Cup winners medal, before moving back to Kirkcaldy after the season ended, due to poor health.
