= Shepherd's Bush F.C. =

Shepherd's Bush
- Full name: Shepherd's Bush Football Club
- Nickname: The Bushmen
- Founded: 1880
- Dissolved: 1915
- Ground: Various, including Loftus Road
- Capacity: ?
Home colours

Shepherd's Bush Football Club was an English football club based in Shepherd's Bush, in the London Borough of Hammersmith and Fulham, although they originally played in central and south London.

== History ==
The club was founded as Old St Stephen's FC in 1880 in Westminster, although it soon moved out to play in Denmark Hill and Nunhead. In 1892 the club was a founder member of the Southern Alliance, one of the first attempts at a league in southern England, and topped the table before the competition was abandoned before the 1892–93 season was out. In 1894 the club went on to become a founder member of the Southern League Second Division and finished third in its inaugural season; however the club lost a test match against Royal Ordnance Factories and did not achieve promotion to the First Division.

The club continued to play in the Southern League under the Old St Stephen's name for another three seasons, never performing better than during its inaugural season. During this time, in 1895, it moved across London to Shepherd's Bush, playing on Shepherd's Bush Green itself, which was to host football at the 1908 Summer Olympics (linked article says this event took place at White City stadium). In 1898 Old St Stephen's merged with another local team to become Shepherd's Bush FC. The club took Old St Stephen's place in the Southern League and continued to play until the 1901–02 season.

Gaining the nickname of "the Bushmen", the club moved to Wormholt Farm, but when that site was threatened with development in 1904, Shepherd's Bush built and moved into the Loftus Road ground nearby, playing its first game there against Old Malvernians on 22 October 1904. In 1907, the club joined the Spartan League, after winning the 1906–07 Great Western Suburban League, and a year later the Isthmian League, where it played until the outbreak of World War I.

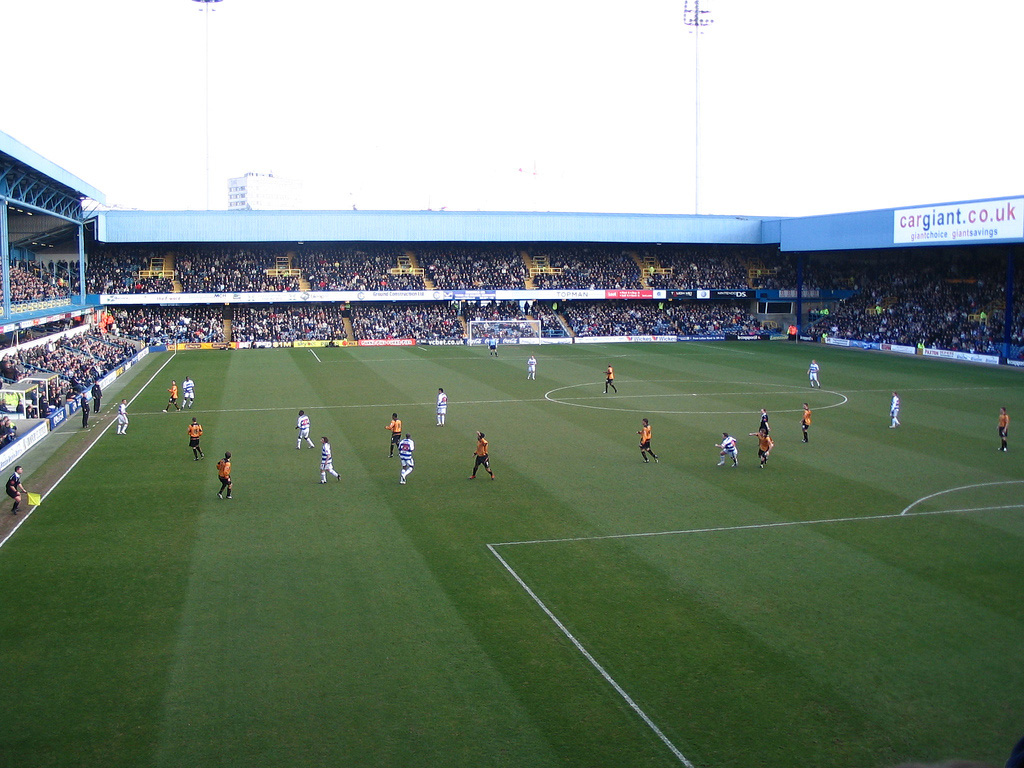
Loftus Road as it is today

During wartime, Shepherd's Bush F.C. was unable to play any further fixtures and disbanded in 1915. In 1917, the ground, Loftus Road, was taken over by Queens Park Rangers, which continues to occupy it.

== Colours ==
The club's colours, from its Old St Stephen's days, were red and white vertical stripes.
