= Kevin Stead =

English footballer

Personal information
- Full name: Kevin Stead
- Date of birth: 2 October 1958
- Place of birth: West Ham, England
- Date of death: 19 January 2016 (aged 57)
- Place of death: Dagenham, England
- Position: Defender

Youth career
- 197?–1976: Tottenham Hotspur

Senior career*
Years	Team	Apps	(Gls)
1976–1977	Tottenham Hotspur	0	(0)
1977–1979	Arsenal	2	(0)
- Oxford City
- * Club domestic league appearances and goals

Kevin Stead (2 October 1958 – 19 January 2016) was an English professional footballer who played as a defender for Tottenham Hotspur, Arsenal and Oxford City.

== Life and career ==
Stead was born in West Ham, London, and began his career playing youth football as a defender with Tottenham Hotspur, where his older brother Micky was already a player. He never made a first-team appearance for Tottenham, and moved on to rivals Arsenal on a free transfer in July 1977. He was a regular in the reserves in the Football Combination, made his first-team debut on 14 October 1978, as a substitute in a 1–0 defeat away to Wolverhampton Wanderers in the Football League First Division, and played his second and final match for Arsenal's first team the following week, starting in a 1–0 win at home to Southampton. He was released in September 1979, and joined Isthmian League club Oxford City.

After retiring from football, Stead worked as a taxi-driver. He was married to Sharon and had two daughters. He died at his home in Dagenham in 2016 at the age of 57.
