= David Pryde (footballer) =

Scottish footballer

Personal information
- Full name: David Pryde
- Date of birth: 10 November 1913
- Place of birth: Newtongrange, Midlothian, Scotland
- Date of death: 1987 (aged 73–74)
- Position: Wing half

Youth career
- Margate

Senior career*
Years	Team	Apps	(Gls)
1935–1946	Arsenal	4	(0)
1935–1937	→ Margate (loan)		
1946–1950	Torquay United	64	(0)
- * Club domestic league appearances and goals

David Pryde (10 November 1913 – 1987) was a Scottish footballer.

Born in Newtongrange, Pryde started out as an amateur at Margate, before being signed by Margate's "parent" club, Arsenal, in May 1935. He was immediately loaned back out to Margate for another two seasons, before returning to Arsenal and taking his place in the club's reserve side as wing half. He made his first-team debut in a First Division match against Sunderland on 4 February 1939, a game Arsenal won 2–0. He went on to make four appearances that season, but like many footballers of his generation, his career was interrupted by World War II.

During the War he served with the Royal Air Force in India and Burma, while occasionally playing wartime matches for Arsenal (making 23 appearances in total, which are not officially counted). By the time official football had resumed in 1946–47, Pryde was 32, and he left Arsenal in October 1946 with just four pre-war league appearances to his name. He moved to Torquay United and spent four seasons there, making 64 league appearances, before retiring in 1950. He died in 1987.
