= Harry Thorpe =

English footballer

Personal information
- Full name: Harold Cheetham Thorpe
- Date of birth: 1880
- Place of birth: Barrow Hill
- Date of death: 16 September 1908 (aged 27–28)
- Position: Defender

Senior career*
| Years | Team | Apps | (Gls) |
| 1900?–1903 | Chesterfield Town | 64 | (0) |
| 1903–1904 | Woolwich Arsenal | 10 | (0) |
| 1904–1907 | Fulham | 70 | (?) |
| 1907–1908 | Leicester Fosse | 26 | (0) |
- * Club domestic league appearances and goals

Harry Thorpe (1880–16 September 1908 ) was a footballer who played as a defender in the Football League and Southern Football League in the 1900s.

He made his Football League debut in the 1900–01 season with Chesterfield F.C., making 64 league appearances for them over the next few seasons, before moving to Woolwich Arsenal. He made 10 appearances in total for Arsenal between 1903 and 1904. In 1904 he joined Fulham of the Southern League, and played 70 league games for them, putting him in the top 10 of all-time Fulham appearances in that league.

Thorpe returned to the Football League in 1907 with Leicester Fosse, and he played for them in their giant-killing FA Cup victory over Blackburn Rovers on 11 January 1908.

He died in 1908 of influenza.
