= Ernie Wallington =

English footballer

Personal information
- Full name: Edward Ernest Wallington
- Date of birth: 8 July 1895
- Place of birth: Rickmansworth, Hertfordshire, England
- Date of death: 15 February 1959 (aged 63)
- Place of death: Croydon, Surrey, England
- Position: Outside forward

Youth career
- 1913–1920: Watford

Senior career*
Years	Team	Apps	(Gls)
1920–1923	Watford	51	(5)
1923–1924	Arsenal		
- * Club domestic league appearances and goals

Edward Ernest Wallington (8 July 1895 – 15 February 1959) was an English footballer.

Born in Rickmansworth, Hertfordshire, Wallington started his working life as an amateur in local football, and also played regularly for Watford reserves. He turned professional in 1920, coinciding with Watford's entry into the Football League, and made his first professional appearance on 16 March 1921, in a 1–1 draw to Gillingham at Priestfield Stadium. He scored his first goal exactly one month later, in another 1–1 draw, at home to Crystal Palace at Vicarage Road, and finished the season with 9 appearances and 1 goal.

Wallington established himself as a first-team regular in the 1921–22 season, making 40 appearances in all competitions. However, he lost his place to Jimmy Stephenson four games into the following season, and never played a first-team match for the club again. He was released on a free transfer in June 1923, and joined First Division side Arsenal three months later. After making one first team appearance in 1923–24, Wallington left the club, and later returned to amateur football.

He died on 15 February 1959, aged 63.
