= James Andrew Corcoran =

- Born: March 31, 1820; Charleston, South Carolina
- Died: July 16, 1889 (aged 69); Philadelphia, Pennsylvania
- Education: College of Propaganda, Rome
- Occupations: theologian editor writer

James Andrew Corcoran (March 31, 1820 in Charleston, South Carolina – July 16, 1889 in Philadelphia, Pennsylvania) was the editor of the United States Catholic Miscellany, the first distinctively Catholic literary periodical published in the United States and the theologian for the bishops of the United States in the First Vatican Council. He authored "the Spalding formula", an attempted compromise during the First Vatican Council on the doctrine of papal infallibility. At the age of 14 he was sent to the College of Propaganda, Rome, where was ordained a priest on 21 December 1842. He was the first person native to the Carolinas who received priestly orders. He remained a year longer in Rome to complete his studies and was made doctor in sacred theology.
