= George Wolfe (footballer) =

English footballer

Personal information
- Full name: George Wolfe
- Date of birth: 9 October 1878
- Place of birth: Plumstead, England
- Date of death: 1958 (aged 79–80)
- Position: Centre half

Senior career*
Years	Team	Apps	(Gls)
1897–1898	Northfleet		
1898–1899	Folkestone		
1900–1902	Woolwich Arsenal	5	(0)
1903–1905	Swindon Town	46	(0)
1905–1911	Nottingham Forest	128	(1)
1911	Folkestone		
Total		179	(1)
- * Club domestic league appearances and goals

George Wolfe (9 October 1878–1958) was an English footballer who played in the Football League for Nottingham Forest and Woolwich Arsenal.
