= George Burrell (footballer) =

English footballer

Personal information
- Date of birth: 1892
- Place of birth: Newcastle upon Tyne, England
- Date of death: Unknown
- Height: 5 ft 7 in (1.70 m)
- Position: Forward

Senior career*
Years	Team	Apps	(Gls)
- Shildon Athletic
- South Shields
- Leyton
1912-1914	Woolwich Arsenal	24	(3)
- South Shields
- * Club domestic league appearances and goals

George Burrell (born 1892, date of death unknown) was an English professional footballer.

Burrell was born in Newcastle upon Tyne and played at outside left. He played initially for Shildon Athletic, South Shields, and Leyton before being signed by Woolwich Arsenal in 1912. He made his league debut against Newcastle United on 28 September 1912 and took over the outside left spot from Thomas Winship in a season in which Arsenal were relegated. In 1913–14, Burrell lost his place to Winship and only played six times. He was given a free transfer in the summer of 1914 and rejoined South Shields; in total he had played 24 games for Arsenal, scoring three goals.
