= London Charity Cup =

The London Charity Cup was one of the London Football Association's cup competitions.

== History ==
The London FA previously ran three senior cup competitions, the London Challenge Cup, the London Senior Cup (known also as the London Senior Amateur Cup) and the London Charity Cup. The only time a club reached the final of all three competitions in the same season was in 1959–60. Tooting & Mitcham won the London Senior Cup after defeating Bromley 5–0 in the final played at The Den (home of Millwall). Tooting & Mitcham were losing finalists in the other two competitions after being beaten 2–1 by Barnet in the final of the London Charity Cup and 2–1 by Chelsea in the final of the London Challenge Cup. Both finals were played on the winning side's home ground.

The original trophy was donated by the Rt. Hon. Reginald Harrison. The competition was discontinued in 1975.

== List of finals ==
=== Key ===
Match went to extra time
Shared trophy

Season	Venue	Winners	Result	Runners-up	Notes	Att.	Ref
1886–87	Kennington Oval	Swifts	3–0	Casuals	Kick-off was delayed to allow spectators to watch the Boat Race.	1500	
1887–88	Kennington Oval	Swifts	1–0	Casuals		1500	
1888–89	Kennington Oval	Old Westminsters	6–3	Swifts		2500	
1889–90	Essex County Ground	Royal Arsenal	3-1	Old Westminsters		8000	
1890–91	Essex County Ground	Casuals	1-1	Old Carthusians		2500	
1890–91	Essex County Ground	Casuals	5-2	Old Carthusians	Replay.	3000	
1891–92	Essex County Ground	Crusaders	1–0	Millwall Athletic		3000	
1892–93	Essex County Ground	Crusaders	2–1	Old Carthusians		4500	
1893–94	Essex County Ground	Casuals	2-1	Old Westminsters		5000	
1894–95	Essex County Ground	London Caledonians	3-1	Old Carthusians		2000	
1895-96	Essex County Ground	Old Carthusians	3-1	Casuals		2000	
1896–97	Essex County Ground	Casuals	5-0	Old Carthusians		4000	
1897-98	Essex County Ground	Old Carthusians	3-0	Casuals		6000	
1898–99	Essex County Ground	Clapton	2-1	Old Carthusians		5500	
1899–1900	Ilford Sports Ground	Clapton	1-1	Old Carthusians		3000	
1899–1900	Ilford Sports Ground	Clapton	3-0	Old Carthusians	Replay.	3000	
1900–01	Campdale Road	Casuals	3-1	Clapton		3500	
1901–02	Campdale Road	Clapton	7-0	Shepherds Bush		4000	
1902–03	Spotted Dog	Clapton	3-1	Casuals		3000	
1903–04	Essex County Ground	Casuals	3-1	Clapton		3000	
1904–05	Newbury Park	Casuals	1-0	Clapton		3000	
1905–06	Campdale Road	London Caledonians	2-0	Casuals		6000	
1906-07	Campdale Road	Casuals London Caledonians	0-0 aet		Trophy Shared.	4500	
1907-08	Herne Hill	Shepherd's Bush	2-0	Nunhead		3000	
1908–09	Freeman's Ground	London Caledonians	1-1	Nunhead		2000	
1908–09	Granleigh Road	London Caledonians	1-0	Nunhead	Replay.	2000	
1909–10	Newbury Park	Leytonstone	3-0	Clapton		3000	
1910–11	Herne Hill	Dulwich Hamlet Nunhead	1-1		Trophy shared.	5000	
1910–11	Herne Hill	Dulwich Hamlet Nunhead	2-2		Trophy shared.	6000	
1911-12	Herne Hill	Nunhead	3-2	Dulwich Hamlet		4500	
1912–13	Champion Hill	London Caledonians	3-0	Nunhead		3000	
1913-14	Herne Hill	Nunhead	1-0	Dulwich Hamlet		6000	
1914-15	Champion Hill	Nunhead	2-1	London Caledonians		4000	
1915-19	No competition held due to World War I.						
1919–20	Champion Hill	Dulwich Hamlet	2–1	London Caledonians		4000	
1920-21	Newbury Park	Dulwich Hamlet	7-4	Leytonstone		3000	
1921-22	The Den	Ilford	3-1	Barking Town		10.000	
1922-23	Highbury	Dulwich Hamlet	2-1	London Caledonians		6500	
1923–24	Upton Park	Dulwich Hamlet Clapton	1-1 aet		Trophy Shared.	7000	
1924-25	Plough Lane	London Caledonians	1-0	Casuals			
1925-26	Brown's Ground	Dulwich Hamlet	2-0	London Caledonians		5955	
1926–27	Vicarage Field	Kingstonian	3-2	Ilford		3500	
1927-28	Plough Lane	Dulwich Hamlet	5-2	Ilford			
1928–29	Selhurst Park	Dulwich Hamlet	2-1	Kingstonian		6000	
1929-30	Griffin Park	Ilford	3-2	Dulwich Hamlet			
1930–31	Plough Lane	Kingstonian Dulwich Hamlet	2-2 aet		Trophy Shared.		
1931–32	Champion Hill	Kingstonian	4-1	Ilford		5498	
1932–33	Champion Hill	Kingstonian	2-0	Leyton			
1933–34	Champion Hill	Walthamstow Avenue	2–0	Kingstonian		5000	
1934–35	Hare & Hounds	Leyton	4-1	Barnet			
1935–36	Champion Hill	Wimbledon	2–1	Kingstonian	Final was held over until September of season 1936–37.	3000	
1936–37		Leyton					
1937-38		Ilford	2-1	Dulwich Hamlet			
1938-39							
1939-40							
1945-46							
1946-47	Vicarage Field	Barnet	2-1	Leyton			
1947-48		Dulwich Hamlet	2-1	Walthamstow Avenue			
1948-49							
1949–50	Stamford Bridge	Wimbledon	2–1	Dulwich Hamlet	Final was held over until September of season 1950–51.		
1950-51		Walthamstow Avenue	3-2	Corinthian-Casuals			
1951–52	Champion Hill	Wimbledon	2–1	Walthamstow Avenue	Final was held over until September of season 1952–53.		
1952–53	Granleigh Road	Leytonstone	3-1	Barnet			
1953-54							
1954-55							
1955-56							
1956-57		Dulwich Hamlet					
1957-58		Dulwich Hamlet					
1958-59	Newbury Park	Hounslow Town	1-0	Ilford			
1959–60	The Underhill	Barnet	2–1	Tooting & Mitcham			
1960–61		Hayes	3–2	Hounslow Town			
1961–62	Vicarage Field	Barking	1–0	Ilford	After extra-time, 0-0.		
1962–63	Newbury Park	Ilford; Barnet	2–2		Trophy shared. After extra-time.		
1963–64	Lower Mead	Wealdstone	2–1	Barnet			
1964–65		Finchley	2–1	Hayes			
1965–66		Ilford	1–0	Erith & Belvedere			
1966–67		Dagenham	1–0	Leyton			
1967–68		Dagenham	1–0	Sutton United	After extra-time.		
1968–69		Dagenham	3–1	Sutton United			
1969–70		Sutton United	4–2	Kingstonian			
1970–71		Dagenham	2–0	Leyton			
1971–72		Dagenham	8–2	Southall			
1972–73		Dagenham	4–1	Sutton United			
1973–74		Cheshunt	2–0	Walthamstow Avenue			
1974–75		Dagenham	2–1	Kingstonian			

== See also ==
- London Football Association
- London Senior Cup
- London Challenge Cup
