= Roger Davidson (footballer) =

English footballer (born 1948)

Personal information
- Date of birth: 27 October 1948 (age 78)
- Place of birth: Islington, England
- Position: Midfielder

Youth career
- 1964–1968: Arsenal

Senior career*
Years	Team	Apps	(Gls)
1968–1969	Arsenal	1	(0)
1969–1970	Portsmouth	3	(0)
1970–1971	Fulham	1	(0)
1971–1972	Lincoln City	6	(0)
1972	Aldershot	12	(2)
Total		23	(2)
- * Club domestic league appearances and goals

Roger Davidson (born 27 October 1948) is an English former professional footballer who played as a midfielder.

== Career ==
Born in Islington, Davidson joined Arsenal in 1964, turned professional in October 1965, and made his senior debut in March 1968. That remained Davidson's sole Arsenal appearance in the Football League, and he later played for Portsmouth, Fulham, and Lincoln City, before ending his career with Aldershot. After his football career, he worked as a black cab driver.
