= Fred Beardsley =

English footballer (1856–1939)

Personal information
- Full name: Frederick William Beardsley
- Date of birth: 13 July 1856
- Place of birth: Nottingham, England
- Date of death: 1939 (aged 82–83)
- Place of death: Plumstead, London, England
- Position: Goalkeeper

Senior career*
Years	Team	Apps	(Gls)
1884–1889	Nottingham Forest	0	(0)
1886–1891	Royal Arsenal	91	(0)
- * Club domestic league appearances and goals

Frederick William Beardsley (13 July 1856 – 1939) was an English footballer, chiefly associated with the foundation of Arsenal Football Club. Beardsley was the first ever Vice-captain of what was to be Arsenal Football Club after beginning work as an iron turner at the Royal Arsenal, and helping to found the club in its early days.

== Career ==
=== Nottingham Forest ===
Beardsley is known to have played for Nottingham Forest from at least 1884, and, even after moving to London, continued to make guest appearances for the club. In 1886, he is said to have asked Nottingham Forest for some kits and a ball to help start what became Arsenal F.C., giving them the red kit which they wear to this very day. (Note: Contrary to popular belief, Beardsley and Nottingham Forest did not provide the original red shirts worn by the players. Beardsley suggested that they play in the same colours as Forest, the shirts were purchased locally.)

=== Dial Square/Royal Arsenal ===
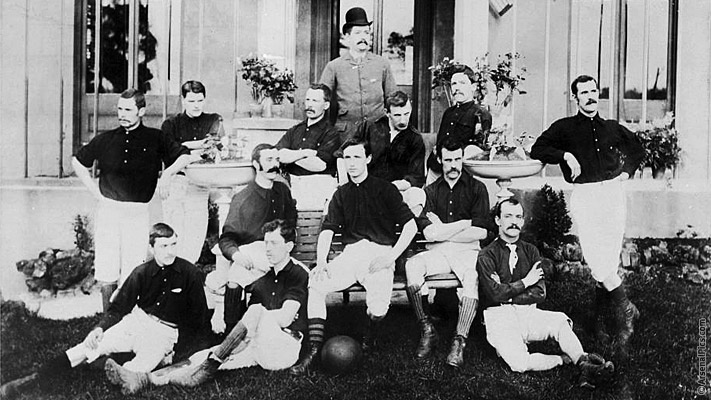
Arsenal's squad for the 1888–89 season. Beardsley is standing, arms folded, at the back.

Beardsley made his first appearance against Eastern Wanderers, in Arsenal's very first game, as the club's inaugural goalkeeper. He was the first-choice goalkeeper across the next four seasons, up until his retirement in 1891. With the Royal Arsenal, he won the Kent Senior Cup, the London Charity Cup and was a runner-up in the London Senior Cup. It is unclear as to how many appearances in total Beardsley made due to the paucity of the line-ups, however he made two FA Cup appearances, in Royal Arsenal's first ever FA cup matches.

==== Continued Involvement in football ====
Beardsley retired in 1891 from his playing career, but was elected to vice-chairman and continued to sit on the board of directors for Royal Arsenal F.C. for another two decades as well as working as a scout for the club. He did not retire from the club entirely until 1910, at the age of 54.

== Sources ==
- Harris, Jeff (1995). Hogg, Tony (ed.). Arsenal Who's Who. Independent UK Sports. ISBN 1-899429-03-4.
- James, Josh; Andrews, Mark; Kelly, Andy (2018). Arsenal: The Complete Record. deCoubertin Books. ISBN 978-1-90924-575-4.
- Roper, Alan (2004). The Real Arsenal Story: In the Days of Gog. Wherry. ISBN 0-9546259-1-9.
- Soar, Phil; Tyler, Martin (2005). The Official Illustrated History of Arsenal. Hamlyn. ISBN 0-600-61344-5.
