= Amateur Football Alliance Senior Cup =

Amateur football competition in England

The Amateur Football Alliance Senior Cup is an amateur football competition in England organised by the Amateur Football Alliance. The competition is contested by the first teams of clubs affiliated to the Alliance.

== Finals ==
=== Key ===
Match went to a replay
Match went to extra time
Match decided by a penalty shootout after extra time
Shared trophy

Season	Winners	League	Result	Runner-up	Venue	Notes
1907–08	Casuals	SAL	3–1	Old Carthusians	Queen's Club (Att: 2,000)	
1908–09	New Crusaders	SAL	5–1	Casuals	Ipswich (Att: 4,000)	
1909–10	Civil Service	SAL	1–0	Old Malvernians	The Saffrons (Att: 1,500)	
1910–11	Old Malvernians	Arthurian	3–2	Casuals	Ipswich (Att: 3,000)	
1911–12	Oxford	SAL	2–1	Old Carthusians	Ipswich (Att: 2,000)	
1912–13	Casuals	SAL	3–2	New Crusaders	White City (Att: 6,000)	
1913–14	Ealing Association	SAL	5–2	Civil Service	Tufnell Park Grounds	
1919–20	Civil Service	Isthmian	4–2	Merton	Lynn Road (Att: 1,200)	
1920–21	Ealing Association	SAL	2–1	Barclays Bank	Brentford	
1921–22	Eastbourne	SAL	1–0	Ealing Association	Brentford	
1922–23	Aquarius	SAL	3–2	Eastbourne	Shepherd's Bush	
1923–24	Bank of England	SAL	3–1	Eastbourne	Crystal Palace	
1924–25	Eastbourne	SAL	2–0	Ealing Association	Wimbledon	
1925–26	Lensbury	SOL	4–2	Carshalton	Brentford	
1926–27	Ealing Association	SAL	3–1	Kew Association	Highbury	
1927–28	Bank of England	SAL	4–2	Ipswich Town	Dulwich	
1928–29	HMS Excellent	SAL	5–1	Northampton Nomads	Dulwich	
1929–30	Civil Service	SAL	2–0	Cambridge Town	Leytonstone	
1930–31	Cambridge Town	SAL	1–0	St Albans City	Ipswich	
1931–32	Hitchin Town	Spartan	2–2	Derbyshire Amateurs	Dulwich	
1931–32	Hitchin Town	Spartan	6–0	Derbyshire Amateurs	Dulwich	Replay
1932–33	Catford Wanderers	SAL	3–1	St Albans City	Dulwich	
1933–34	St Albans City	Isthmian	3–2	Barclays Bank	Ilford	
1934–35	Harwich & Parkeston	SAL	4–1	HMS Excellent	Barking	
1935–36	Harwich & Parkeston	ECL	2–0	Hastings & St. Leonards	Selhurst	
1936–37	Harwich & Parkeston	ECL	7–1	Worthing	Bromley	
1937–38	Hastings & St. Leonards	Spartan	4–0	Lewes	Eastbourne	
1938–39	Moor Green	CAL	5–2	Norsemen	Enfield	
1946–47	Cambridge Town	Spartan	4–2	Worthing	Leytonstone	
1947–48	Boldmere St. Michaels; Cambridge Town	CAL; Spartan	2–2		Birmingham	Trophy shared.
1948–49	Cambridge Town	Spartan	3–0	Worthing	Ilford	
1949–50	Cambridge Town	Spartan	4–1	London University	Brentford	
1950–51	Histon Institute	Spartan	2–0	HMS Excellent	St. Albans	
1951–52	Norsemen	SOL	3–1	Winchmore Hill	Enfield	
1952–53	HMS Daedalus; Winchmore Hill	SAL	0–0		Wimbledon	Trophy shared.
1953–54	Southgate Olympic	SOL	3–1	Winchmore Hill	Barnet	
1954–55	Alexandra Park	SAL	4–1	Polytechnic	Wealdstone	
1955–56	Hanwell Corinthians		3–1	Nottingham University	Cambridge	
1956–57	Walpole Athletic		1–0	Cuaco	Ilford	
1957–58	Barclays Bank	SAL	2–1	HMS Daedalus	Chiswick	
1958–59	Cuaco	SAL	3–0	Nottingham University	Chiswick	
1959–60	Winchmore Hill	SAL	1–0	Cuaco	Norbury	
1960–61	Lloyds Bank	SAL	5–4	Old Monovians	Motspur Park	
1961–62	Cuaco	SAL	1–0	Nottingham University	Norbury	
1962–63	Nottingham University	MAA	3–0	Midland Bank	Wealdstone	
1963–64	Old Camdenians	OBFL	3–2	Old Malvernians	Dulwich	
1964–65	Old Actonians Association	Nemean	3–1	Nottingham University	Dulwich	
1965–66	Savings Bank Department	SOL	2–1	Old Actonians	Dulwich	
1966–67	Borough Polytechnic	SAL	4–3	Westminster Bank	Dulwich	
1967–68	Old Salesians	OBFL	1–1	Old Stationers	Hounslow	
1967–68	Old Salesians	OBFL	4–0	Old Stationers	Hounslow	Replay.
1968–69	Westminster Bank	SAL	3–1	Civil Service	Bromley	
1969–70	Penguins	SOL	4–3	Midland Bank	Dulwich	
1970–71	Midland Bank	SAL	1–0	Old Actonians	Dulwich	
1971–72	West Wickham	SAL	2–0	East Barnet Old Grammarians	Dulwich	
1972–73	Old Actonians Association	Nemean	4–0	Southgate Olympic	Dulwich	
1973–74	Southgate Olympic	SAL	2–0	Old Parkonians	New Beckenham	
1974–75	Kew Association	SAL	2–0	Catford Wanderers	Sutton	
1975–76	Old Aloysians	OBFL	2–1	West Wickham	Sutton	
1976–77	Midland Bank	SAL	4–2	Old Fincunians	Hayes, Kent	
1977–78	Kew Association	SAL	3–1	National Westminster Bank	Hayes, Kent	
1978–79	Lloyds Bank	SAL	2–0	Carshalton	Norbury	
1979–80	Old Grammarians	SOL	2–1	Old Esthameians	Norbury	
1980–81	West Wickham	SAL	4–2	South Bank Polytechnic	Ealing	
1981–82	Old Grammarians	SOL	0–0	Old Parmiterians	Roehampton	
1981–82	Old Grammarians	SOL	2–1	Old Parmiterians	New Beckenham	Replay.
1982–83	Norsemen	SAL	4–2	South Bank Polytechnic	Roehampton	
1983–84	Old Esthameians	SAL	2–0	Old Aloysians	Molesey	
1984–85	Old Salesians	SAL	3–2	South Bank Polytechnic	Molesey	
1985–86	Old Esthameians	SAL	2–1	Old Ignatians	Molesey	
1986–87	Old Aloysians	OBFL	3–2	West Wickham	Beckenham	
1987–88	Old Aloysians	OBFL	3–3	Old Finchleians	Chiswick	
1987–88	Old Aloysians	OBFL	2–1	Old Finchleians	Twickenham	Replay.
1988–89	Old Stationers	SAL	1–0	Old Ignatians	Beckenham	
1989–90	Old Salesians	SAL	2–1	West Wickham	Banstead	
1990–91	Norsemen	SAL	1–0	Carshalton	Sydenham	
1991–92	West Wickham	SAL	2–1	Midland Bank	Beckenham	
1992–93	National Westminster Bank	SAL	2–2	Old Hamptonians	Chiswick	
1992–93	National Westminster Bank	SAL	3–0	Old Hamptonians	Chiswick	Replay.
1993–94	Crouch End Vampires	SAL	3–0	Old Ignatians	New Beckenham	
1994–95	National Westminster Bank	SAL	3–1	Civil Service		
1995–96	Old Actonians Association	SAL	4–0	Civil Service		
1996–97	Civil Service	SAL	4–0	Lensbury		
1997–98	Old Aloysians	OBFL	2–0	Old Finchleians		
1998–99	Old Finchleians	SAL	4–1	Honourable Artillery Company		
1999–00	UCL Academicals	SOL	1–1	Crouch End Vampires	Fairlop	4–2 on penalties.
2000–01	UCL Academicals	SOL	2–1	Civil Service		
2001–02	Old Meadonians	OBFL	1–1	Old Actonians Association		
2002–03	Winchmore Hill	SAL	1–0	Bromleians Sports	Northaw	
2003–04	Old Meadonians	AFC	3–0	Nottsborough		
2004–05	Old Meadonians	AFC	3–0	Polytechnic		
2005–06	Winchmore Hill	SAL	1–0	Old Owens	Edmonton	
2006–07	West Wickham	SAL	4–0	Old Hamptonians	Fairlop	
2007–08	Old Meadonians	AFC	2–2	Nottsborough	New Beckenham	
2008–09	Nottsborough	SAL	1–0	Polytechnic	Roehampton	
2009–10	Winchmore Hill	SAL	3–0	Nottsborough	Edmonton	
2010–11	Old Salesians	SAL	3–2	Old Carthusians	Winchmore Hill	
2011–12	Winchmore Hill	SAL	1–0	Civil Service	New Beckenham	
2012–13	Old Minchendenians	AFC	3–0	Old Salesians	Chigwell	
2013–14	Old Wilsonians	SAL	3–1	Winchmore Hill	Fairlop	
2014–15	Old Wilsonians	SAL	3–2	Old Meadonians	Roehampton	
2015–16	West Wickham	SAL	2–0	Old Garchonians	Hayes, Kent	
2016–17	Polytechnic	SAL	4–1	Old Carthusians	Northaw	
2017–18	Actonians Association	SAL	4–2	Old Meadonians	New Beckenham	
2018–19	Old Carthusians	Arthurian	3–1	Old Meadonians	Roehampton	
2019–20	Nottsborough	SAL	2–1	Norsemen	Northaw	
2020–21	No competition due to COVID-19 pandemic.					
2021–22	Nottsborough	SAL	2–0	Wandsworth Borough	Winchmore Hill	
2022–23	Wimbledon Casuals	SPCL	0–0	Nottsborough	Kew	5–4 on penalties.
2023-24	Actonians Association	SAL	2-0	Civil Service	Norsemen	
2024–25	Enfield Old Grammarians	AFC	3-1	Wandsworth Borough	Old Aloysians	
2025–26	London Fennecs	MCFL	2-2	Nottsborough	Beckenham	5-4 on penalties.

== Wins by club ==
Club	Pld	Won	Shared	Lost
Winchmore Hill	9	5	1	3
West Wickham	8	5	0	3
Cambridge City	6	4	1	1
Civil Service	10	4	0	6
Old Meadonians	7	4	0	3
Old Aloysians	5	4	0	1
Old Salesians	5	4	0	1
Actonians Association	8	5	0	0
Nottsborough	8	3	0	5
Ealing Association	5	3	0	2
Norsemen	5	3	0	2
Harwich & Parkeston	3	3	0	0
HSBC	5	2	0	3
Casuals	4	2	0	2
Cuaco	4	2	0	2
Eastbourne Town	4	2	0	2
National Westminster Bank	3	2	0	1
Old Esthameians	3	2	0	1
Richmond & Kew	3	2	0	1
Southgate Olympic	3	2	0	1
Bank of England	2	2	0	0
Lloyds Bank	2	2	0	0
Old Grammarians	2	2	0	0
Old Wilsonians	2	2	0	0
UCL Academicals	2	2	0	0
Nottingham University	5	1	0	4
Old Carthusians	5	1	0	4
Polytechnic	4	1	0	3
Barclays Bank	3	1	0	2
HMS Excellent	3	1	0	2
Old Finchleians	3	1	0	2
Old Malvernians	3	1	0	2
St Albans City	3	1	0	2
Catford Wanderers	2	1	0	1
Crouch End Vampires	2	1	0	1
Hastings & St. Leonards	2	1	0	1
New Crusaders	2	1	0	1
Old Stationers	2	1	0	1
Weirside Rangers	2	1	0	1
Westminster Bank	2	1	0	1
Alexandra Park	1	1	0	0
Aquarius	1	1	0	0
Hanwell Corinthians	1	1	0	0
Histon	1	1	0	0
Hitchin Town	1	1	0	0
Moor Green	1	1	0	0
Old Camdenians	1	1	0	0
Old Minchendenians	1	1	0	0
Oxford	1	1	0	0
Penguins	1	1	0	0
Savings Bank Department	1	1	0	0
South Bank AFC	1	1	0	0
Walpole Athletic	1	1	0	0
Wimbledon Casuals	1	1	0	0
Enfield Old Grammarians	1	1	0	0
HMS Daedalus	2	0	1	1
Carshalton	3	0	0	3
Old Ignatians	3	0	0	3
South Bank Polytechnic	3	0	0	3
Worthing	3	0	0	3
Old Hamptonians	2	0	0	2
Bromleians Sports	1	0	0	1
Derbyshire Amateurs	1	0	0	1
East Barnet Old Grammarians	1	0	0	1
Honourable Artillery Company	1	0	0	1
Ipswich Town	1	0	0	1
Lewes	1	0	0	1
London Fennecs	1	0	0	1
London University	1	0	0	1
Merton	1	0	0	1
Northampton Nomads	1	0	0	1
Old Fincunians	1	0	0	1
Old Garchonians	1	0	0	1
Old Monovians	1	0	0	1
Old Owens	1	0	0	1
Old Parkonians	1	0	0	1
Old Parmiterians	1	0	0	1
Wandsworth Borough	2	0	0	2
