= Crouch End Vampires F.C. =

- Full name: Crouch End Vampires Football Club
- Nickname: The Vamps
- Founded: 1883; 143 years ago, as Crouch End; 1897; 129 years ago, as Crouch End Vampires
- Ground: Muswell Hill Sports Ground
- League: Southern Amateur League Intermediate North Division 3
- 2025–26: Southern Amateur League Intermediate North Division 2, 10th of 10 (relegated)
- Website: http://www.crouchendvampires.co.uk/

Crouch End Vampires F.C. are an amateur football club from the Crouch End area of north London, based at the Muswell Hill Sports Ground. The club are affiliated to the Amateur Football Alliance and are currently members of the Southern Amateur League Intermediate North Division 3. The club was formed through the merger of Crouch End F.C. and Vampires F.C. in 1897.

== Early history ==
Founded c. 1883 as Balmoral Football Club, Crouch End were invited to join a proposed Southern Football League in 1891 but rejected the offer. The idea was subsequently dropped after Arsenal joined the Football League.

On 3 October 1891, Crouch End played their first game of FA Cup competition. After beating Ashford United 6–2, their 1891–92 campaign ended in a 0–4 loss to Chatham in the second qualifying round.

Both Crouch End and the Vampires featured in the first ever season of the London League in 1896–97, finishing fifth and sixth respectively. In the Vampires' first ever London League game on 19 September 1896 they lost to Thames Ironworks 0–3.

In 1897, Crouch End merged with the Vampires, who were based in Norbury, and were renamed Crouch End Vampires.

On 6 October 1900, the club beat London Welsh 3–0 in the first qualifying round of the 1900–01 FA Cup, but failed to beat Civil Service in the next round. The following year, 1901–02, they played London Welsh again, running out as 0–1 winners in the preliminary round. They beat Fulham 4–2 in the first qualifying round, and overcame Willesden Town 3–1 in the second. They fell to Queens Park Rangers in the third qualifying round 2–0 on 2 November 1901. In the 1902–03 FA Cup, they beat West Hampstead 6–1 in the first qualifying round, but failed to beat Fulham in the second.

Olympic gold medal-winner Richard Turner played for the team, as did his brother, Alf Turner, who also played for Watford and later turned out for Nottingham Forest.

Steadfast proponents of the amateur game, the club were affiliated to the Amateur Football Defence Council (the forerunner of the Amateur Football Alliance). In September 1906, the club was a signatory when the AFDC warned the London FA that its affiliated clubs would be boycotting the London Senior Cup the following season. The following year, the organisation (then known as the Amateur Football Defence Federation) was reformed as the Amateur Football Association and they affiliated. They were also founding members of the Southern Amateur League the same year.

== Recent times ==
The club are one of three founding Southern Amateur League members that are currently in membership, the others being Alleyn Old Boys and Civil Service. They currently compete in the Senior Division 2 of the Southern Amateur League. The club participate in an annual Easter Tournament hosted by KFC Rood-Wit, an amateur club in Antwerp, Belgium.

Former Tottenham Hotspur and Queens Park Rangers player Dave McEwen began his career at the club.
