= 1905–06 Isthmian League =

The 1905–06 Isthmian League season was the first in the history of the Isthmian League, an English football competition.

London Caledonians emerged as champions.

== League table ==
Isthmian League
- Season: 1905–06
- Champions: London Caledonians
- Matches: 30
- Goals: 86 (2.87 per match)

Pos	Team	Pld	W	D	L	GF	GA	GR	Pts
1	London Caledonians	10	7	1	2	25	8	3.125	15
2	Clapton	10	6	1	3	11	13	0.846	13
3	Casuals	10	3	4	3	14	14	1.000	10
4	Civil Service	10	4	1	5	16	20	0.800	9
5	Ealing Association	10	3	2	5	15	19	0.789	8
6	Ilford	10	1	3	6	5	12	0.417	5

Source: fchd.com rsssf.com
Rules for classification: 1) points; 2) goal ratio.
