= Southern Amateur Football League =

Association football league in England

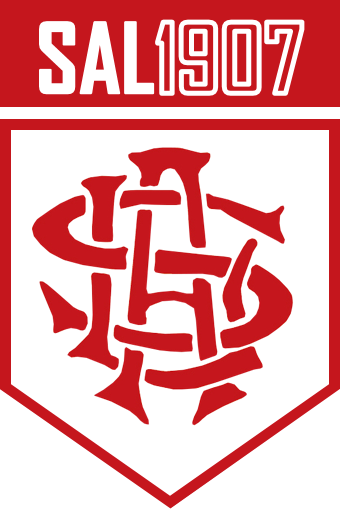
- Sport: Football
- Founded: 1907
- No. of teams: c. 320 (30 divisions) (4 senior divisions)
- Country: England
- Most recent champions: West Wickham (Division 1); Nottsborough 2nd (Division 2); Old Wilsonians (Division 3); Old Parmiterianx 2nd (Division 4)
- Website: www.southernamateurleague.co.uk

The Southern Amateur League (SAL) is an association football league in England affiliated to the Amateur Football Alliance (AFA). It is based in and around Greater London and caters for 11–a–side men's adult teams. A feature of the league is 'multi-team football', common in AFA leagues, with clubs fielding an average of 3.5 teams each. For season 2025-26 the league has more than 100 member clubs including several veterans-only clubs running around 320 teams in 30 divisions. All clubs are strictly amateur. In 2025 The SAL merged with the Amateur Football Combination creating the largest adult football league in Europe.

== Club set-up, sportsmanship and hospitality ==
As in other AFA leagues it is common for clubs to run several teams with some SAL clubs running up to 10 teams. This allows players of all abilities to play against teams from other clubs of a similar standard. The best players will be picked for the 1st team, the best of the remainder going into the 2nd team and so on down the club.

The SAL places emphasis on sportsmanship and hospitality, with all players expected to socialise with their opponents and the match officials after the game. Disciplinary problems and cases of violent conduct are generally perceived to be experienced less in SAL football – and AFA football in general – than in other types of football.

== League set-up and Challenge Cups ==
The League is divided into four sections: Senior (4 divisions), Northern (11 divisions) and Southern (15 divisions). Teams can be promoted between Sections.

In 2018 a Veterans Section was added, divided into north and south sections for league competitions. Clubs do not have to enter the open-age competitions in order to enter the veterans competition and do not have to play in the veterans league competition in order to enter the cup competitions.

As well as league competitions the SAL runs ten cup competitions. These are:

- Senior Cup (for teams in Senior Divisions 1, 2 and 3)
- Challenge Cup (for teams in Senior Divisions 4 plus Intermediate North and South)
- Intermediate Cup (for teams in Intermediate Divisions 1, 2 and 3)
- Junior Cup (for teams in Intermediate Division 4, Junior Divisions 1 North and 1 South)
- Minor Cup (Junior Division 2 North and Junior Division 2 South)
- Senior Novets Cup (Junior Division 3 North and Junior Division 3 South)
- Intermediate Novets Cup (Junior Division 4 South and Junior Division 5 South)
- Junior Novets Cup (Junior Division 4 North and Junior Division 6 South)
- Veterans Sunday Senior Cup (straight knockout, open entries)
- Veterans Sunday Junior Cup (straight knockout, open entries)

The Junior Cup and below were inaugurated for the 1995–96. The Senior and Intermediate Cups were introduced for season 2015–16 and the Challenge for 2025-26. They were not previously considered necessary as 1st and 2nd teams were offered an extra 'county divisional' cup by the AFA (either the Middlesex/Essex Cup or the Surrey/Kent Cup, depending on location). The veterans competitions began in 2018.

== Current member clubs ==
Three of the current members (Alleyn Old Boys, Civil Service and Crouch End Vampires F.C.) are founder members of the League while 19 have been in membership since before World War II.

Club	Main Ground	Founded	Joined SAL
Actonians Association	Gunnersbury Drive, Ealing, W5 4LL	1925	1977
Alexandra Park	Alexandra Park, London, N22 7BD	1898	1925, 1947
Alleyn Old Boys	The Edward Alleyn Club, Rear of 83–85 Burbage Road, London, SE24 9HD	1888	1907
Bank of England	Bank of England Sports Club, London, SW15 5JQ	1908	1920
Broomfield	Hazelwood Sports Ground, Madeira Road, Off Hedge Lane, London, N13 5ST	1911	1958
Cambridge Heath	Hackney Marshes, London, E9 5PF	2011	2017
Carshalton	Carshalton Football Club, Church Road, Carshalton, SM6 7NN	1898	1912
Chattan	Hackney Marshes, London, E9 5PF	1994	2021
City of London	Rutland Walk Sport Ground, Rutland Walk, London, SE6 4LG	1931	2017
Civil Service	Kings House Sports Ground, Riverside Drive, Chiswick, London, W4 2SH	1863	1907, 1928
Crouch End Vampires	Muswell Hill Playing Fields, London, N101JP	1883	1907, 1928
East Barnet Old Grammarians	Alan Drive, Off Mays Lane, Barnet, EN5 2PU	1948	1977
Hammersmith	Ark Burlington Danes Academy, Wood Lane, London W12 0HR	2021	2021
HSBC	HSBC Sports & Social Club, Lennard Road, New Beckenham, BR3 1QW	1900	1921
Ibis Eagles	Chiswick Cricket Club, Riverside Drive, London, W4 2SP	2015	2015
Merton	Joseph Hood Recreation Ground, Martin Way, Merton, London, SW20 9BU	1910	1919
Norsemen	Edmonton Sports & Social Club, Church Street, Edmonton, London, N9 9HL	1896	1908
Nottsborough	Kingston University Sports Ground, Tolworth Court, Worcester Park, Surrey, KT4 7QH	1988	2001
NUFC Oilers	The Hive, Camrose Avenue, London, HA8 6AG	2012	2013
Old Blues	Kew & Ham Sports Association, Riverside Drive, Ham, Richmond, TW10 7RX	2011	2011
Old Finchleians	12 Southover, Woodside Park, N12 7JE	1901	1998
Old Garchonians	Chase Lodge Playing Fields, London, NW7 2ED	2011	2011
Old Lyonians	South Vale, Harrow, HA1 3PN	1902	1924
Old Parkonians	Old Parkonians Pavilion, Oakfield Playing Fields, Forest Road, Ilford, Essex, IG6 3HD	1902	1919
Old Salesians	Old Tenisonians Sports Ground, New Malden, KT 3 6LX	1923	1983
Old Stationers	Old Elizabethans Memorial Ground, Gypsy Corner, Mays Lane, Barnet, EN5 2AG	1906	1932
Old Wilsonians	Hayes Hill, Hayes, BR2 7HN	1888	1919, 2004
Old Wimbledonians	Old Wimbledonians & Donhead Sports Ground, Coombe Lane, Raynes Park SW20 0QX	1970	2021
Owens	Old Owens Sports Ground, Coopers Lane, Potters Bar, EN6 4NE	1891	1996
Polytechnic	University of Westminster Sports Ground, London, W4 3UH	1875	1954
Richmond & Kew	Ham Playing Fields, Riverside Drive, Ham, Richmond TW10 7QA	1906	1925
South Bank Cuaco	Turney Road, Dulwich, London, SE21 7JH	2001	2001
Southgate Olympic	Barrowell Green, London, N21 3AU	1993	2001, 2023
St. James' Old Boys	Copthall Playing Fields, London, NW4 1RL	2014	2015
The Warren	Club Langley, 2 Hawksbrook Lane, Beckenham, BR3 3SR	2015	2015
Weirside Rangers	Udney Park, Teddington, TW11 9BG	1919	1927
West Wickham	West Wickham Cricket & Football Club, Corkscrew Hill, West Wickham, BR4 9BA	1901	1938
Winchmore Hill	Winchmore Hill Sports Club, The Paulin Ground, Fords Grove, London, N21 3ER	1920	1928

== Representative team ==
The League representative team has played a programme of friendly fixtures since 1907 against other AFA affiliated leagues and universities such as Oxford and Cambridge. Two matches are played each season in memory of past servants to the League. The Champion Club plays against the Senior Cup winners at the beginning of each season for the Stuart Hyde Trophy, named for the former SAL and Southgate Olympic team manager. The League also plays the Amateur Football Combination for the Steve Langley Cup in honour of the former SAL, AFA and Crouch End Vampires captain. This match is part of the Argonaut Trophy competition which also involves the Arthurian League in which the three league representative teams play a round-robin tournament. Since 2007 the team has played in the FA Inter-League Cup which it won at the first attempt in 2008. This earned the team the chance to represent England at the 2008 UEFA Regions Cup.

== League champions and Cup winners ==
Season	Section 'A'	Section 'B'			
1907–08	New Crusaders	Reigate Priory ^{(s)}			
1908–09	New Crusaders ^{(a)}	Norsemen			
1909–10	New Crusaders	Tunbridge Wells			
1910–11	New Crusaders	Alleyn Old Boys			
1911–12	Civil Service	L.C.W. & Parr's Bank			
1912–13	New Crusaders	Crouch End Vampires			
1913–14	Civil Service	Carshalton			
Season	Division 1	Division 2	Division 3		
1919–20	Merton	Aquarius			
1920–21	Cambridge Town	Cheshunt			
1921–22	Ipswich Town	L.J.C. & Midland Bank			
1922–23	Eastbourne	Old Parkonians ^{(e)}			
1923–24	Westminster Bank	Barclays Bank			
1924–25	Midland Bank	Old Lyonians			
1925–26	Eastbourne	Toc H.			
1926–27	Ealing Association ^{(a)}	Merton			
1927–28	Cambridge Town	Hastings & St Leonards			
1928–29	Cambridge Town	Kew Association ^{(s)}	Britannic House		
1929–30	Ipswich Town	Merton ^{(s)}	Civil Service ^{(a)}		
1930–31	Cambridge Town ^{(a)}	Civil Service	Catford Wanderers		
1931–32	Cambridge Town	Catford Wanderers	East Grinstead		
1932–33	Ipswich Town	Lloyds Bank	Cuaco		
1933–34	Ipswich Town	Westminster Bank	Alexandra Park		
1934–35	Hastings & St Leonards	Cuaco	Thornycroft		
1935–36	Hastings & St Leonards	Aquarius	Highgate ^{(e)}		
1936–37	Hastings & St Leonards	Highgate* Ealing Association*			
1937–38	Civil Service	Norsemen* Lensbury & Britannic House*			
1938–39	Hastings & St Leonards	National Provincial Bank* Eastbourne*			
1939–45	no competition	no competition	no competition		
1945–46	Merton	Old Parkonians			
1946–47	Ealing Association	Westminster Bank* Winchmore Hill*			
1947–48	Winchmore Hill	Barclays Bank* Alexandra Park*			
1948–49	Winchmore Hill	Brentham	National Provincial Bank		
1949–50	Catford Wanderers	Crouch End Vampires	Old Latymerians		
1950–51	Catford Wanderers	Midland Bank	Aquarius		
1951–52	Winchmore Hill	Civil Service	Cuaco		
1952–53	Catford Wanderers	Pinner	Old Stationers		
1953–54	Alexandra Park	Lensbury & Britannic House	Old Lyonians		
1954–55	Winchmore Hill	Carshalton	Aquarius		
1955–56	Winchmore Hill	Barclays Bank	Polytechnic		
1956–57	Cuaco	Lensbury & Britannic House	Ibis		
1957–58	Old Westminster Citizens	Old Stationers ^{(o)}	Merton		
1958–59	Cuaco ^{(a)}	Polytechnic	Broomfield		
1959–60	Cuaco	Broomfield	Crouch End Vampires		
1960–61	Broomfield	Borough Polytechnic	National Provincial Bank		
1961–62	Cuaco ^{(a)}	Polytechnic	Kew Association		
1963–64	Midland Bank	West Wickham	Old Parkonians		
1964–65	Old Stationers	Catford Wanderers	Pearl Assurance		
1965–66	Southgate Olympic	Ibis	Old Westminster Citizens		
1966–67	Norsemen	Winchmore Hill	Barclays Bank		
1967–68	Winchmore Hill	Civil Service	Old Bromleians		
1968–69	Civil Service	Barclays Bank	Kew Association		
1969–70	Midland Bank	Kew Association	Pearl Assurance		
1970–71	Civil Service	Ibis	Old Bromleians ^{(o)}		
1971–72	Southgate Olympic	Barclays Bank	Old Esthameians ^{(o)}		
1972–73	Midland Bank	Old Westminster Citizens	Brentham		
1973–74	Midland Bank	Norsemen	Carshalton		
1974–75	Catford Wanderers	Old Bromleians ^{(o)}	Old Esthameians		
1975–76	Midland Bank	Barclays Bank	Merton		
1976–77	Kew Association	Carshalton	South Bank Polytechnic		
1977–78	West Wickham	Barclays Bank	East Barnet Old Grammarians ^{(m)}		
1978–79	Catford Wanderers	East Barnet Old Grammarians ^{(o)}	Old Westminster Citizens		
1979–80	West Wickham	Southgate Olympic	Old Bromleians		
1980–81	Old Esthameians ^{(o)}	Old Bromleians	Britannic House		
1981–82	West Wickham	Old Parkonians	Old Stationers		
1982–83	Crouch End Vampires	Lensbury	Barclays Bank		
1983–84	Winchmore Hill	Old Stationers	Old Salesians		
1984–85	West Wickham	Old Salesians ^{(a, o)}	Old Actonians Association		
1985–86	National Westminster Bank	Old Actonians Association ^{(m)}	Ibis		
1986–87	West Wickham	Old Parkonians ^{(e, o)}	Brentham		
1987–88	West Wickham	Old Actonians Association	Merton		
1988–89	West Wickham	Midland Bank	East Barnet Old Grammarians		
1989–90	West Wickham	Carshalton	Southgate Olympic		
1990–91	West Wickham	Old Bromleians	Alexandra Park		
1991–92	Old Actonians Association	Crouch End Vampires	Lensbury		
1992–93	National Westminster Bank	Lensbury	Old Latymerians		
1993–94	South Bank Polytechnic	East Barnet Old Grammarians	Old Parmiterians		
1994–95	South Bank AFC	Carshalton	Old Lyonians		
1995–96	Old Actonians Association ^{(a)}	Old Parmiterians	Old Salesians		
1996–97	Old Parmiterians	Lloyds Bank	Midland Bank		
1997–98	Norsemen	National Westminster Bank ^{(s)}	Old Stationers		
1998–99	Old Actonians Association ^{(m)}	Old Bromleians	Alleyn Old Boys		
1999–00	Old Actonians Association ^{(m)}	Alleyn Old Boys	Broomfield		
2000–01	Old Actonians Association	Broomfield	Old Lyonians		
2001–02	Old Owens	Old Salesians	Nottsborough		
2002–03	Old Salesians	Winchmore Hill ^{(a)}	Bank of England		
2003–04	Old Esthameians	Nottsborough	Kew Association		
2004–05	Broomfield ^{(me)}	East Barnet Old Grammarians	Old Wilsonians		
2005–06	Old Owens ^{(o)}	Alleyn Old Boys	Merton		
2006–07	Nottsborough	Polytechnic ^{(me)}	South Bank Cuaco		
2007–08	West Wickham ^{(sk)}	Old Esthameians	Old Parkonians		
2008–09	Nottsborough ^{(a)}	Broomfield	Lloyds TSB Bank		
2009–10	Nottsborough	East Barnet Old Grammarians	Old Parkonians		
2010–11	Nottsborough	Norsemen	Old Westminster Citizens		
2011–12	Old Salesians	Civil Service	Alexandra Park		
2012–13	Nottsborough	Polytechnic	Old Garchonians		
2013–14	Old Owens ^{(o)}	Old Garchonians	NUFC Oilers		
2014–15	Winchmore Hill	NUFC Oilers	Lloyds AFC		
Season	Division 1	Division 2	Division 3		Senior Cup
2015–16	Polytechnic ^{(me)(†)}	Old Parkonians	HSBC		Polytechnic
2016–17	Polytechnic ^{(a)(†)}	East Barnet Old Grammarians	Norsemen		Polytechnic
2017–18	Polytechnic	Actonians Association ^{(a)}	Carshalton		Winchmore Hill
2018–19	West Wickham	Norsemen	Crouch End Vampires		Polytechnic
2019–20	abandoned due to COVID-19 pandemic	abandoned due to COVID-19 pandemic	abandoned due to COVID-19 pandemic		Actonians Association
2020–21	abandoned due to COVID-19 pandemic	abandoned due to COVID-19 pandemic	abandoned due to COVID-19 pandemic		Little Heath
2021-22	West Wickham†	Civil Service	Hammersmith		West Wickham
2022-23	West Wickham	Hammersmith	Weirside Rangers		Actonians Association
2023-24	Nottsborough	Weirside Rangers	West Wickham 2nd		Nottsborough
Season	Division 1	Division 2	Division 3	Division 4	Senior Cup
2024-25	West Wickham	Nottsborough 2nd	Old Wilsonians	Old Parmiterians 2nd	Nottsborough
2025-26	Nottsboroug	Enfield Old Grammarians	Southgate County	Nottsborough 3rd	Hammersmith

- Between 1936 and 1948 (not including the years of World War II and the transitional season of 1945–46) the league operated two Second Divisions divided apparently at random (certainly not geographically) and no Third Division.

^{(†)} indicates team also won SAL Senior Cup
^{(a)} indicates team also won AFA Senior Cup
^{(e)} indicates team also won AFA Essex Senior Cup
^{(m)} indicates team also won AFA Middlesex Senior Cup
^{(s)} indicates team also won AFA Surrey Senior Cup
^{(me)} indicates team also won AFA Middlesex/Essex Senior Cup
^{(sk)} indicates team also won AFA Surrey/Kent Senior Cup
^{(o)} indicates team also won Old Boys Senior Cup

Senior Division 1 championships
12 - West Wickham
8 - Winchmore Hill
6 - HSBC
5 - Actonians Association, Cambridge Town, Catford Wanderers, Civil Service, New Crusaders, Nottsborough
4 - Cuaco, Hastings & St Leonards, Ipswich Town
3 - Old Owens, Polytechnic
2 - Broomfield, Ealing Association, Eastbourne, Merton, National Westminster Bank, Norsemen, Old Esthameians, Old Salesians, South Bank AFC, Southgate Olympic
1 - Alexandra Park, Crouch End Vampires, Kew Association, Old Parmiterians, Old Stationers, Old Westminster Citizens, Westminster Bank

Senior Division 2 championships
7 - Barclays Bank
5 - Carshalton, Civil Service, East Barnet Old Grammarians, Old Parkonians
4 - Old Bromleians, Polytechnic
3 - Alleyn Old Boys, Broomfield, Crouch End Vampires, HSBC, Lensbury & Britannic House, Westminster Bank, Winchmore Hill
2 - Catford Wanderers, Ibis, Kew Association, Lloyds Bank, Merton, Old Salesians, Old Stationers, Winchmore Hill
1 - Brentham, Cheshunt, Cuaco, Ealing Association, Eastbourne, Hastings & St Leonards, Highgate, National Provincial Bank, National Westminster Bank, Nottsborough, NUFC Oilers, Old Esthameians, Old Garchonians, Old Lyonians, Old Parmiterians, Old Westminster Citizens, Pinner, Reigate Priory, South Bank AFC, Southgate Olympic, Toc H., Tunbridge Wells, Winchmore Hill

Senior Division 3 championships
4 - Merton
3 - Alexandra Park, Kew Association, Old Bromleians, Old Lyonians, Old Parkonians, Old Stationers, Old Westminster Citizens
2 - Aquarius, Barclays Bank, Brentham, Britannic House, Broomfield, Carshalton, Crouch End Vampires, Cuaco, East Barnet Old Grammarians, HSBC, Ibis, Lloyds Bank, National Provincial Bank, Old Esthameians, Old Latymerians, Old Salesians, Pearl Assurance, Weirside Rangers
1 - Actonians Association, Alleyn Old Boys, Bank of England, Catford Wanderers, Civil Service, East Grinstead, Hammersmith, Highgate, Norsemen, Nottsborough, NUFC Oilers, Old Garchonians, Old Parmiterians, Old Wilsonians, Polytechnic, South Bank AFC, Southgate Olympic, Thornycroft

Senior Cup victories
3 - Polytechnic
2 - Actonians Association
1 - Old Carthusians, West Wickham Winchmore Hill

== Sources ==
- Southern Amateur League
