= United London Scottish F.C. =

United London Scottish
- Full name: United London Scottish Football Club
- Nickname(s): the Scotchmen, U.L.S.
- Founded: 1883
- Dissolved: 1887
- Ground: Queen's Park, West Kilburn
- Secretary: C. Irvine
Home colours

United London Scottish Football Club was an English football club, founded in 1883.

== History ==
The club was established at a meeting held at the Fitzroy Arms, Drummond Street, Euston Square on 15 August 1883. Although there had previously been teams representing Scots living in London, U.L.S. was the first club set up on a permanent basis. It was active in its first season, playing 33 matches, and two of its players appeared in trial matches for the London Football Association representative side. In 1884–85, the club entered the London Senior Cup for the first time, and reached the third round (last 15), losing to West End in a replay.

In 1885–86, the club entered the FA Cup for the only time, losing 4–2 to Upton Park at Wanstead; the club had a strong reputation by then, being described as "well-known". The club had two goals disallowed for offside, one decision reckoned by many in the "large attendance" to have been incorrect.

The club went one stage further in the London Senior Cup than in the preceding year, reaching the quarter-finals. In the third round, the club beat Barnes club 9–1 at Kilburn; Barnes protested the result but did not turn up to the scheduled re-match. In the quarter final the club lost in a replay to Pilgrims at the Kennington Oval, the club taking the lead but losing 4–1. Between the original match and the replay, the Scotchmen went on a tour of the north, which was not successful, the side shipping 12 goals at Rangers and seven at Aston Villa.

=== London Caledonians and demise ===
In 1885, Hugh Macpherson, a player with Champion Hill F.C., another London club with a number of Scots members, founded London Caledonians F.C., because of the "scant success" of United London Scottish. Macpherson brought together more Scots players for the new club, including some of the U.L.S. players such as Bill Stirling (a forward converted into a goalkeeper) and captain W.E. Fry, with the result that U.L.S. was both no longer needed and no longer competitive. In the 1886–87 London Senior Cup, U.L.S. went down 7–1 at St Martin's Athletic of Priory Farm in the first round, whereas London Caledonians reached the quarter-finals. The club also entered the London Junior Cup that season for clubs not at a senior level, playing a first round tie one week later, but fared just as badly, losing 5–0 at Upton Ivanhoe.

The last mention of the club is its 2–0 defeat at Clapham Pilgrims in the first round of the London Senior Cup in 1887–88.

== Colours ==
The club played in navy blue shirts with a thistle on the left breast.

== Ground ==
The club played at Queen's Park in West Kilburn, using the Albert Edward inn for facilities.
