= 1907–08 Isthmian League =

The 1907–08 Isthmian League season was the third in the history of the Isthmian League, an English football competition.

At the end of the previous season Casuals, Civil Service and Ealing Association resigned from the league. Dulwich Hamlet, Oxford City and West Norwood joined the league. London Caledonians won the title for a second time in three years.

== League table ==
Isthmian League
- Season: 1907–08
- Champions: London Caledonians
- Matches: 30
- Goals: 120 (4 per match)

Pos	Team	Pld	W	D	L	GF	GA	GR	Pts
1	London Caledonians	10	5	2	3	20	15	1.333	12
2	Clapton	10	4	3	3	24	14	1.714	11
3	Ilford	10	5	1	4	28	22	1.273	11
4	Oxford City	10	5	1	4	20	20	1.000	11
5	Dulwich Hamlet	10	3	2	5	15	18	0.833	8
6	West Norwood	10	3	1	6	13	31	0.419	7

Source: fchd.com rsssf.com
Rules for classification: 1) points; 2) goal ratio.
