= Andrew Ralston =

Andrew Ralston may refer to:

- Andrew Patrick Ralston, American actor
- Andrew Thomson Ralston (1880–1950), Scottish amateur footballer and football administrator
