= Middlesex Senior Cup =

Football cup competition in the historic county of Middlesex, England

- Founded: 1889
- Region: Middlesex
- Current champions: Southall (13th title)
- Most championships: Hendon (15 titles)

The Middlesex Senior Cup is the most prestigious football cup competition in the historic county of Middlesex, England. The competition is run mainly for non-League clubs in the region, although league clubs have been known to enter the competition, including Brentford, Barnet and Chelsea. In order to be eligible to play in the Middlesex Senior Cup, clubs have to play at step 5 or above of the National League System.

== Finals ==
#	Season	Winners	Score	Losers	Notes
1	1888–89	Clapton	4–0	Phoenix	
2	1889–90	London Caledonians	3–1	Crouch End	
3	1890–91	London Caledonians	1–1	Uxbridge	
	Replay	London Caledonians	2–0	Uxbridge	
4	1891–92	2nd Battalion Scots Guards	4–2	1st Battalion Scots Guards	
5	1892–93	2nd Battalion Scots Guards	2–1	Uxbridge	
6	1893–94	Uxbridge	2–0	3rd Battalion Grenadier Guards	
7	1894–95	2nd Battalion Scots Guards	5–1	London Welsh	
8	1895–96	Uxbridge	1–1	Southall	
	Replay	Uxbridge	3–2	Southall	
9	1896–97	Ealing Association	2–1	3rd Battalion Grenadier Guards	
10	1897–98	Brentford	2–3	2nd Battalion Scots Guards	(Note: Replayed after protest.)
	Replay	Brentford	3–2	2nd Battalion Scots Guards	
11	1898–99	London Caledonians	0–0	West Hampstead	
11	Replay	London Caledonians	5–0	West Hampstead	
12	1899–1900	London Caledonians	4–0	Crouch End Vampires	
13	1900–01	West Hampstead	2–2	London Caledonians	
	Replay	West Hampstead	3–2	London Caledonians	
14	1901–02	Richmond Association	1–0	Ealing Association	
15	1902–03	Shepherd's Bush	4–1	West Hampstead	
16	1903–04	Richmond Association	0–0	Shepherd's Bush	
	Replay	Richmond Association	1–0	Shepherd's Bush	
17	1904–05	Ealing Association	1–0	London Caledonians	
18	1905–06	West Hampstead	2–0	2nd Battalion Grenadier Guards	
19	1906–07	New Crusaders	3–0	West Hampstead	
20	1907–08	Southall	3–0	Hanwell	
21	1908–09	1st Battalion Scots Guards	4–0	West Hampstead	
22	1909–10	Shepherd's Bush	4–0	Staines	
23	1910–11	Southall	1–0	Enfield	
24	1911–12	Southall	3–1	Lotus	
25	1912–13	Southall	2–0	West London Old Boys	
26	1913–14	Enfield	2–0	Uxbridge	
27	1919–20	Botwell Mission	3–1	Southall	
28	1920–21	Botwell Mission	3–0	Enfield	
29	1921–22	RAF Uxbridge	2–1	Barnet	
30	1922–23	Southall	2–1	Botwell Mission	
31	1923–24	Southall	3–1	Wealdstone	
32	1924–25	Southall	5–0	Hampstead Town	
33	1925–26	Botwell Mission	2–1	Barnet	
34	1926–27	Southall	2–1	Uxbridge	
35	1927–28	Metropolitan Police	3–0	RAF Uxbridge	
36	1928–29	Finchley	2–0	Southall	
37	1929–30	Wealdstone	2–2	Haywards Sports (Enfield)	
	Replay	Wealdstone	3–1	Haywards Sports (Enfield)	
38	1930–31	Hayes	4–1	Hampstead	
39	1931–32	Barnet	0–2	Park Royal	
	Replay	Barnet	4–3	Park Royal	
40	1932–33	Barnet	1–1	Staines Town	
	Replay	Barnet	3–1	Staines Town	
41	1933–34	Golders Green	2–0	Park Royal	
42	1934–35	London Caledonians	2–0	Uxbridge	
43	1935–36	Hayes	2–1	Finchley	
44	1936–37	Southall	1–0	Hayes	
45	1937–38	Wealdstone	3–1	Tufnell Park	
46	1938–39	Golders Green	4–0	Wealdstone	
47	1939–40	Hayes	1–0	Finchley	
48	1940–41	Wealdstone	3–1	Pinner	
49	1941–42	Wealdstone	4–1	Finchley	
50	1942–43	Wealdstone	3–3	Finchley	
	Replay	Wealdstone	3–0	Finchley	
51	1943–44	Finchley	3–0	Acton Town	
52	1944–45	Southall	3–1	Golders Green	
53	1945–46	Wealdstone	2–0	Edgware Town	
54	1946–47	Enfield	1–0	Hendon	
55	1947–48	Edgware Town	2–1	Enfield	
56	1948–49	Hounslow	1–0	Hayes	
57	1949–50	Hayes	2–1	Hounslow	
58	1950–51	Uxbridge	2–1	Hayes	
59	1951–52	Finchley	3–0	Enfield	
60	1952–53	Hounslow	3–1	Finchley	
61	1953–54	Southall	3–0	Edgware Town	
62	1954–55	Southall	4–0	Uxbridge	
63	1955–56	Hendon	5–1	Wembley	
64	1956–57	Hounslow Town	1–0	Hendon	
65	1957–58	Hendon	3–0	Enfield	
66	1958–59	Wealdstone	3–1	Enfield	
67	1959–60	Hendon	2–1	Enfield	
68	1960–61	Hounslow Town	0–0	Hendon	
	Replay	Hounslow Town	3–2 aet	Hendon	
69	1961–62	Enfield	4–1	Wealdstone	
70	1962–63	Wealdstone	2–0	Enfield	
71	1963–64	Wealdstone	2–0	Finchley	
72	1964–65	Hendon	1–0	Finchley	
73	1965–66	Enfield	4–1	Wealdstone	(Note: On aggregate over two legs.)
74	1966–67	Hendon	4–1	Enfield	
75	1967–68	Wealdstone	3–1	Hayes	
76	1968–69	Enfield	6–0	Wembley	
77	1969–70	Enfield	3–2	Wealdstone	
78	1970–71	Enfield	3–0	Hendon	
79	1971–72	Hendon	5–2	Hampton	
80	1972–73	Hendon	3–3	Enfield	
	Replay	Hendon	3–0	Enfield	
81	1973–74	Hendon	4–1	Edgware Town	
82	1974–75	Staines Town	1–1	Hendon	
	Replay	Staines Town	1–0	Hendon	
83	1975–76	Staines Town	2–0	Enfield	
84	1976–77	Staines Town	3–2	Hampton	
85	1977–78	Enfield	2–0	Hendon	
86	1978–79	Enfield	2–0	Wembley	
87	1979–80	Enfield	2–0	Staines Town	
88	1980–81	Enfield	2–0	Hayes	
89	1981–82	Hayes	2–0	Wealdstone	
90	1982–83	Harrow Borough	2–0	Wealdstone	
91	1983–84	Wembley	5–1	Hendon	
92	1984–85	Wealdstone	4–2	Enfield	
93	1985–86	Hendon	2–0 aet	Southall	
94	1986–87	Wembley	1–0	Hayes	
95	1987–88	Staines Town	2–1 aet	Wembley	
96	1988–89	Enfield	2–1	Kingsbury Town	
97	1989–90	Staines Town	1–0	Yeading	
98	1990–91	Enfield	1–0	Yeading	
99	1991–92	Yeading	2–1	Wembley	
100	1992–93	Harrow Borough	1–0	Wembley	
101	1993–94	Staines Town	2–1	Edgware Town	
102	1994–95	Yeading	2–0 aet	Staines Town	
103	1995–96	Hayes	3–2 aet	Hampton	
104	1996–97	Staines Town	0–0 aet	Yeading	(Note: Staines Town won 6–5 on penalties.)
105	1997–98	Enfield	3–2	Uxbridge	
106	1998–99	Hendon	2–2	Wembley	(Note: Hendon win 4–2 on penalties.)
107	1999–2000	Hayes	2–0	Northwood	
108	2000–01	Uxbridge	3–0	Harrow Borough	
109	2001–02	Hendon	4–2 aet	Northwood	
110	2002–03	Hendon	2–0	Enfield Town	
111	2003–04	Hendon	3–1 aet	Uxbridge	
112	2004–05	Yeading	3–1	Hampton & Richmond Borough	
113	2005–06	Hampton & Richmond Borough	0–0 aet	Hayes	(Note: Hampton & Richmond Borough won 4–3 on penalties.)
114	2006–07	Northwood	1–1 aet	Hayes	(Note: Northwood won 4–2 on penalties.)
115	2007–08	Hampton & Richmond Borough	3–0	Hendon	
116	2008–09	AFC Hayes	2–1	Hendon	
117	2009–10	Staines Town	2–0	Uxbridge	
118	2010–11	Staines Town	3–2	Hayes & Yeading United	
119	2011–12	Hampton & Richmond Borough	2–0	Wealdstone	
120	2012–13	Staines Town	2–0	Ashford Town (Middlesex)	
121	2013–14	Hampton & Richmond Borough	3–2	Wealdstone	
122	2014–15	Harrow Borough	1–0	Hanwell Town	
123	2015–16	Northwood	2–0	Enfield Town	
124	2016–17	Hampton & Richmond Borough	1–0	Wealdstone	
125	2017–18	Hendon	0–0	Staines Town	(Note: Hendon won 5–4 on penalties.)
126	2018–19	Brentford B	4–0	Harrow Borough	
127	2020–21	Hanwell Town	1–0	Harefield United	
128	2021–22	Barnet	1–1	Brentford B	(Note: Barnet won 4–2 on penalties.)
129	2022–23	Hayes & Yeading United	5–0	Harrow Borough	
130	2023–24	Rayners Lane	3–2	Hayes & Yeading United	
131	2024–25	Rayners Lane	2–0	Hanwell Town	
132	2025-26	Southall	4-0	Broadfields United	

== See also ==
- Middlesex County Football Association
- Middlesex Senior Charity Cup
- George Ruffell Memorial Shield
