= Ealing Association F.C. =

Ealing Association
- Full name: Ealing Association Football Club
- Founded: 1891
- Dissolved: 2013
- Ground: Ealing Central Sports Ground
Home colours

Ealing Association F.C. was an association football club from Ealing in London.

== History ==
The club was founded in 1891 by the headmaster of the Ealing Preparatory School for Boys, Mr Wynne Hall. The club's official name was Ealing Association, to distinguish from a rugby side simply called Ealing.

Before the Second World War, the club was one of the most successful amateur sides in Middlesex. After playing in the first two Isthmian League seasons in 1905–06 and 1906–07, the club finishing 5th out of 6 both times, the club joined the Southern Amateur Football League from the competition's foundation in 1907, and was twice champion. It was also a multiple winner of competitions on a local level.

Ealing's greatest honour on the national stage was reaching the final of the FA Amateur Cup in 1903–04, but lost 3–1 to Sheffield at Valley Parade. The following season, the club reached three finals in consecutive Saturdays; it won the Middlesex Senior and Charity Cups, but lost in the London Senior Cup final to Ilford at Tufnell Park in front of over 5,000 spectators - it was Ealing's only appearance in the London final. In 1907, it was one of the clubs which split from the Football Association to join the Amateur Football Alliance, and it was a three-time winner of the Amateur Football Alliance Senior Cup.

The club frequently undertook foreign tours, mostly to Belgium and France. In 1915 the club visited Portugal, only the second English club to play in the country (after New Crusaders). The club played 5 matches, including a win over and a loss to Benfica.

In 1928, the club's president (and sole England amateur international player), Dick Sloley, formed a new amateur club, Argonauts, to be an English version of the Scottish Queen's Park. The Argonauts had an arrangement to play at Wembley Stadium, which was otherwise only being used for internationals and the FA Cup final, but, after the Argonauts' application to join the Football League was refused, Sloley arranged for Ealing to move to Wembley, as an encouragement for amateur football as a whole. It was not a success, Ealing only attracting crowds of 50 and losing 6 of its 8 matches at Wembley.

The club's fortunes declined after the Second World War, due to the loss of its private ground and needing to rent local authority property. In 1971, after repeated last place finishes in the Southern Amateur League, it failed re-election, so was forced to join the lower-key Nemean Amateur League. The final record of the club is its resignation from Division 2 West of the Amateur Football Combination in 2012–13. It had finished bottom the previous season with only 2 points from 18 games.

== Colours ==
The club's colours were originally green and white, but changed to dark green and red from 1893. They were generally worn in halves until 1969, with "dark" shorts, when the design changed to green shirts with red trimmings. In 1970 the club adopted green shirts with red sleeves.

== Ground ==
The club is known to have played at the following grounds:

- 1891–94: Ealing Common
- 1894–98: West Middlesex Cricket Ground, Gunnersbury Lane
- 1898–1921 Gunnersbury Avenue
- 1921–28, 1929–33: Corfton Road
- 1928–29: Wembley Stadium
- 1933–34: Mill Hill Park Cricket Club, Hanger Lane
- 1934–40: Queen's Drive
- 1946 onwards: Ealing Central Sports Ground, Western Avenue

== Honours ==
- FA Amateur Cup:
  - Runner-up 1903–04
- Southern Amateur League:
  - Champion 1926–27, 1946–47
- A.F.A. Senior Cup:
  - Winner 1913–14, 1920–21, 1926–27
- London Senior Cup:
  - Runner-up 1904–05
- Middlesex Cup:
  - Winner: 1896–97, 1904–05
- Middlesex Charity Cup:
  - Winner: 1903–04, 1904–05, 1907-08, 1908–09, 1909–10
