= National Westminster Bank F.C. =

Association football club in England

Coordinates: 51°23′18.08″N 0°1′21.53″W

National Westminster Bank
- Full name: National Westminster Bank Football Club
- Founded: 1970
- Ground: Club Langley, Beckenham
- League: Amateur Football Combination Division Two South
Home colours

National Westminster Bank Football Club is a football club based in Beckenham, England. They are currently members of the Amateur Football Combination.

== History ==
In 1970, the club was formed as a result of the merger between National Provincial Bank and Westminster Bank to form NatWest. Both respective banks had football clubs that played in the Southern Amateur League. The club competed in the Southern Amateur League from 1970 to 2002, leaving to join the London Financial Football Association. In 1987, National Westminster Bank entered the FA Vase for the only time in their history. The club later joined the Amateur Football Combination.

== Ground ==
Upon the club's formation, the club played at Turle Road in Norbury until 1999. In 1999, National Westminster Bank moved to Beckenham, playing at the Royal Bank of Scotland Sports Ground, before moving to Club Langley in the suburb of Eden Park.

== Records ==
- Best FA Vase performance: Extra preliminary round, 1987–88
