= Waltham Abbey F.C. =

Association football club in England

Coordinates: 51°40′58″N 0°0′21″E

Waltham Abbey Football Club
- Waltham Abbey FC Club Crest
- Full name: Waltham Abbey Football Club
- Nickname: The Abbotts
- Founded: 1944
- Ground: Capershotts, Waltham Abbey
- Capacity: 3,500
- Chairman: John Martin
- Manager: Marc Weatherstone
- League: Southern League Division One Central
- 2025–26: Isthmian League North Division, 3rd of 22 (transferred)
Home colours	Away colours

Waltham Abbey F.C. is an English football club based in Waltham Abbey, Essex. The team currently plays in the Southern League Division One Central.

== History ==
Waltham Abbey Youth Club, based in Waltham Abbey, first played football at “Capershotts” during the Second World War and in later years the club became known as firstly Waltham Abbey, then Abbey Sports. Both clubs gained numerous honours in the Northern Suburban League.

The club was founded in 1944 with a mix of players from Waltham Abbey Youth Club and former juniors from Tottenham Hotspur under the leadership of the trainer and manager Wally Hickman. The secretary was Mo (Maurice) Ward. The President was Capt. Larkin.

In their early years they played to a high standard and reached the final of the Herts Junior Cup in three years out of four but lost on each occasion – including a loss to Redbourn Rovers of 4–5 after they had been leading 4–1.

Some of the leading players in the early years included left winger Dave Cook who was killed in a road crash, centre-half Robbo Robinson and inside forward Frank Blower. Frank later became a dedicated treasurer of the club with Ray Buck as a similarly dedicated club secretary.

Waltham Abbey United emerged in the late sixties and a new clubhouse was built. In 1974 the club amalgamated with the successful Beechfield Sports and joined the Metropolitan League, which later became the London Spartan League.

In 1976 the club won the Essex Junior Cup beating Maldon St Mary's 1–0 at Grays Athletics ground. Alfie Hall was the goalscorer. Later that summer the club dropped the Beechfield Sports tag on the advice of The FA. Two years later the club reached the final of the Essex Intermediate Cup (losing 1–2 to Dagenham Reserves at Epping Town FC) and won the league's Division One title, and, having gained Senior Status, were promoted. In their first season they won the title without losing a game and were again promoted this time to the Premier Division where they remained until season 2000–01.

In 1990–91 the club were inaugural finalists in the Roy Bailey Memorial Trophy, a competition for local teams including Cheshunt, Ware, and Hertford Town.

It was won for the first time in 1994–95 when they beat Hoddesdon Town. In both 1996–97 and 2005 (in the final held over from the previous season) they beat St Margaretsbury.

In 1998–99 they won the London Senior Cup with a fine 3–2 win over Bedfont at Dulwich Hamlet’s ground, Dean Green securing a hat trick to win the cup. They also secured the Spartan South Midlands Challenge Trophy beating Holmer Green 3–0 over two legs.

Recent seasons have seen a lot of changes on and off the pitch with floodlights being installed in 1990 and the ground levelled. A great amount of work has been done around the clubhouse and a 200-seater stand built. A number of seats were purchased from Maine Road and these were installed during the summer of 2005 as the club strived to improve facilities on and off the field and move up the non-league pyramid.

Season 2001–02 was spent in the Essex & Herts Border Combination to allow them to move across the pyramid. They were elected to the Essex Senior League for season 2002–03. In 2004–05, in addition to winning both the League Cup and the Gordon Brasted Memorial Trophy they finished in their highest position of 2nd.

On 2 May 2009, the Abbott's capped off a successful 2008–09 season by beating Concord Rangers 5–4 on penalties, after a 1–1 draw, to win the Isthmian League Division 1 North Play-offs. They played in the Isthmian League Premier Division for the first time in their history in 2009–10. However, despite winning the last two games of their season, they finished 21st and were relegated for the first time in the club's history. After 7 seasons in North Division a league restructure saw the club have been moved into the newly formed Isthmian League South Central League.

== Ground ==
The club first played at Capershotts during World War II. In 1990, floodlights were erected at Capershotts, coming from Walthamstow Avenue's Green Pond Road ground after the club had ceased to exist.

== Honours ==
- Essex Junior Cup
  - Winners 1975–76
  - Runners Up 1972–73
- Middlesex Senior Charity Cup Final
  - Runners Up 1997–98
- London Senior Cup
  - Winners 1998–99
- Essex Senior League Cup
  - Winners 2004–05
- Gordon Brasted Memorial Trophy
  - Winners 2004–05
- Middlesex Millenium Cup
  - Winners 2004–05
- Roy Bailey Memorial Trophy
  - Winners 1994–95
  - Winners 1996–97
  - Runners Up 1990–91
- Isthmian League Division North Play Off
  - Winners 2008-09
- Southern League Central Division Play Off
  - Runners Up 2023-24

== Records ==
- FA Cup
  - Third Qualifying Round 2014–15, 2025–26
- FA Trophy
  - Second Round 2026–27
- FA Vase
  - Second Round 1997–98
