= Caledonians F.C. =

Caledonians F.C. may refer to several association football teams:

== Existing clubs ==
- Inverness Caledonian Thistle F.C.

== Defunct clubs ==
- Caledonian F.C.
- London Caledonians F.C.
- Liverpool Caledonians F.C.
