= Lancing Old Boys F.C. =

Lancing Old Boys
- Full name: Lancing Old Boys Football Club
- Nicknames: the LOBs, the Wizards, the Lobsters; originally the Lancians
- Founded: 1877
- Ground: Kingston University Sports Ground, Tolworth
Home colours

Lancing Old Boys is an amateur association football club, based in Tolworth, for the former pupils of Lancing College.

== History ==
The club was founded in 1877, the college's most notable former footballing pupils being Charles Wollaston, who had previously won the FA Cup with the Wanderers five times, and who later played for the Old Boys. Jarvis Kenrick, scorer of the first-ever goal in the FA Cup and also a Cup winner, Edgar Field and Reginald Birkett who both played in FA Cup Finals for Clapham Rovers, and who were both capped for England, with Birkett also scoring England Rugby's first international try. Cuthbert Brisley also deserves a mention scoring 64 goals in 86 games for the Corinthian Casuals including a hat-trick in the first AFA Senior Cup Final in 1908.

The club entered the FA Cup for the first time in 1885–86, beating Barnes 7–1 away in the first round, scoring five times in the second half. The club lost 6–1 to Brentwood in the second round; Bates, the goalkeeper for the original tie, was playing as a back in the second round, and, after the third goal went in, was swapped around with the replacement goalkeeper Brown, to no avail.

The club's entry for the following year was rejected for being received too late (in a friendly played instead, the club lost 12–0 to the Swifts) but returned in 1887–88, losing 4–2 in the first round to the Old Etonians.

With the advance of professional football, the club's last FA Cup entry was in 1888–89, losing to Old St Mark's in the second qualifying round, although the club notably beat Millwall Rovers 4–0 in the first. The club retreated to the old boy competitions, and has had considerable success in the Arthurian League and the Arthur Dunn Cup, particularly in the 1980s, when they won the League and Cup double in three consecutive years.

== Colours ==
The club's original colours were blue and white, the same as the college's football colours. In the 1960s the club wore a combination of French grey, cerise, and chocolate shirts, and 1977 changed to red.

== Ground ==
The club originally played in Surbiton, using the Spread Eagle public house for facilities.

== Honours ==
Arthurian League

- Winners: 1965–66, 1982–83, 1983–84, 1984–85, 1990–91, 1993–94

Arthur Dunn Cup

- Winners: 1982–83 (2-0 v Chigwellians), 1983–84 (2-0 v Carthusians), 1984-85 (5-0 v Foresters), 1992–93 (1-0 v Reptonians), 1995–96 (4-1 v Brentwoods), 1999–2000 (3-0 v Foresters)
- Runners-up: 1979–80 (4-2 aet v Chigwellians), 1998–99 (3-1 v Salopians), 2008-2009 (1-1 pens v Carthusians), 2014–15 (1-0 v Carthusians)

The club has played in 10 finals and 26 semi-finals. Their largest victory in the competition being 13–2 over the Old Westminsters in the 1st round in 1996/97, whilst they went down 10–2 in the 2nd round at Repton in 1920/21.

Note the treble double, winning both the Arthurian League and Arthur Dunn Cup from 82/83 to 84/85 The club has also won three Junior League Cups, three Veterans Cups, and won Div1 twice, Div2 once, Div3 twice, Div4 twice and Div5 once

== Notable players ==
Three players were capped by England while with the club:

- Henry Hammond
- Edward Haygarth
- Charles Wollaston
