= Old Aloysians F.C. =

Old Aloysians
- Full name: Old Aloysians Football Club
- Founded: 1913
- Ground: St Aloysius' College, Highgate
- League: Amateur Football Combination Division One North
Home colours

Old Aloysians Football Club is a football club based in Highgate, England.

== History ==
Founded in 1913, Old Aloysians joined the London League for a two-season stint in the 1920s. After dropping into amateur football, Old Aloysians entered the FA Vase for the first time in the 1976–77 season, losing 5–0 at home in the first round against Alma Swanley.

== Ground ==
Old Aloysians currently play at St Aloysius' College.

== Records ==
- Best FA Vase performance: First round, 1976–77
