= Andrew Thomson Ralston =

Scottish footballer and football administrator

Andrew Ralston

Personal information
- Date of birth: 26 March 1880
- Place of birth: Trodigal, Argyllshire
- Date of death: 31 January 1950 (aged 69)
- Place of death: Ealing, Middlesex
- Position: Full-back

Andrew Thomson Ralston (26 March 1880 - 31 January 1950) was a Scottish amateur footballer and football administrator in England. In a history of London Caledonians FC, Ralston was described as 'a tall, square, big boned youth with a power of kick quite equal to that of the renowned Bill Hay'.

== Life ==
Ralston was born on 26 March 1880 into a farming family at Machrihanish, Argyllshire and was educated in England at Bedford Modern School between 1890 and 1895.

Ralston pursued a career in insurance in London and joined the London Caledonians FC, a team for Scottish exiles based in the capital, and skippered the side for six years. Ralston was a long serving player and continued to represent the club in his forties. He also played as an amateur for various professional clubs including Watford, Southend United and Tottenham Hotspur for whom he made over 100 appearances between 1915 and 1919. As a youngster he had also joined Aston Villa but does not appear to have made any appearances in the first team.

In 1914, he played for London FA against Birmingham FA. During World War II he served in the Royal Air Force and after the war, in 1919, played in a football game between London Command and the RAF. His participation in a game between London Caledonians FC against Oxford University was reported in The Times.

Ralston served as Honorary Secretary of London Caledonians and the Isthmian League between 1926 and 1935 when he took over as Secretary and Treasurer. He also served on the Council of the Football Association where he represented the interests of the amateur game. In his capacity as an official of the FA, in 1949 he arranged a tour of the Nigerian Football team to play teams in England. He also acted as liaison officer for the Sing Tao SC tour of England. As a senior member of the amateur international selection committee, he was in the chair at an FA Dinner in Plymouth where Sir Stanley Rous was the key guest.

Andrew Ralston died at a nursing home in Ealing, Middlesex on 29 January 1950. He had attended the draw of the FA Amateur Cup and had gone on to pay a visit to Vivian Woodward, a famous former player for Spurs, Chelsea and England who had become bedridden. Ralston unfortunately fell ill and died at his bedside. In the magazine of Ralston's old school, Sir Stanley Rous wrote:

As a member of the Council of the Football Association his particular interests lay in amateur football, and both on the International and the Amateur Cup Committee, he was always watching their interests.

There is a photographic portrait of Ralston at the National Portrait Gallery, London.
