= Rex Corbett =

English footballer (1879–1967)

Personal information
- Full name: Reginald Corbett
- Date of birth: 13 June 1879
- Place of birth: Thame, Oxfordshire, England
- Date of death: 2 September 1967 (aged 88)
- Place of death: Shaftesbury, Dorset, England
- Position: Outside left

Senior career*
Years	Team	Apps	(Gls)
- Old Malvernians

International career
1903	England	1	(0)
- * Club domestic league appearances and goals

Reginald "Rex" Corbett (13 June 1879 – 2 September 1967) was an English international footballer, who played as an outside left.

== Career ==
Born in Thame, Corbett played for Old Malvernians, and earned one cap for England in 1903.
