= Polytechnic F.C. =

Association football club in England

Coordinates: 51°28′33.88″N 0°16′00.89″W

- Full name: Polytechnic Football Club
- Nickname: Poly
- Founded: 1873–75
- Ground: Polytechnic Stadium, London
- Capacity: 3,000
- Chairman: Barry Madigan
- Manager: Nick Brandford
- League: Southern Amateur League Senior Division 4
- 2024–25: Southern Amateur League Senior Division 2, 8th of 8 (relegated)
Home colours	Away colours

Polytechnic Football Club, originally Hanover United Football Club, is a football club from Chiswick, West London, England. It is believed to be the first football club to use United in its name. The club is a full member of the Football Association and, the Amateur Football Alliance and currently play in the Southern Amateur League Senior Division 4; they are an FA Charter Standard Club. It was named "Polytechnic" after the former name of the current University of Westminster (The Royal Polytechnic Institution).

== History ==
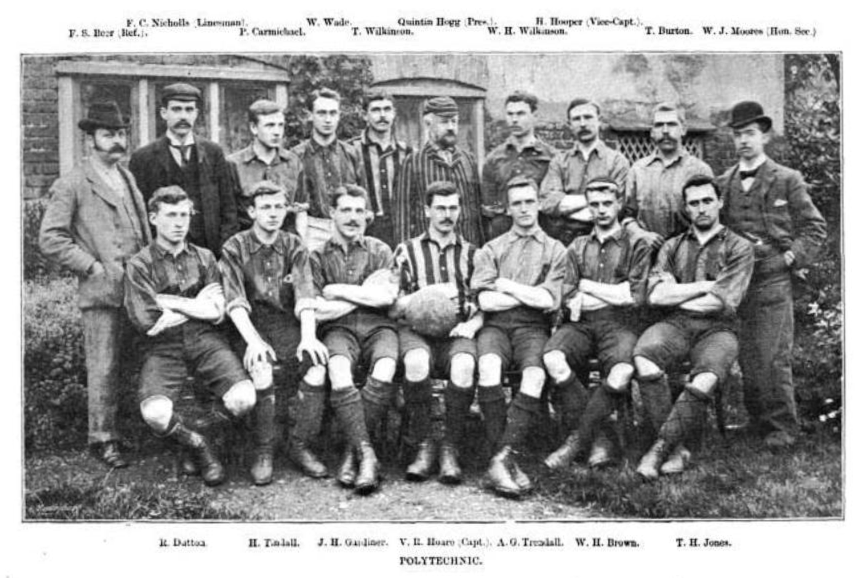
1894

The club was originally established in 1873 or 1875, and was originally called Hanover United Football Club The club entered the FA Cup for the first time in 1879, entering the first round, where they met Grey Friars but lost 2–1. In 1892, under the name Polytechnic Football Club, the club became founder members of the Southern Alliance finishing fourth in the league's only year in existence. The FA Amateur Cup was also entered in 1895. The club played in the Southern Suburban League for a few seasons in the early 1900s before joining the Olympian League for the 1909–10 season.

The 1911–12 season then saw the club become members of the Spartan League. The club stayed in the top division until the end of the 1928–29 season when, finishing bottom, they were relegated to Division One. However, they were subsequently relegated the next season to Division Two East. The club returned to Division One at the end of the 1935–56 season, when they finished third in the division and remained there until the Second World War. After the war the club were placed in the Western Division. The league the following season was then returned to a top division with two division underneath and the club was placed in Division One Western after finishing sixth the year before. The 1951–52 season saw the club finish as runners-up in Division One Western and gain promotion back to the Premier Division. However again they could only last one season in the top division and, after finishing bottom, were relegated.

The 1953–54 season would be their last in the Spartan league with the club leaving at the end of the season to join Division Three of the Southern Amateur Football League, due to the cost of travelling expenses. The club achieved promotion to Division Two in the 1955–56 as champions of Division Three, and followed up three seasons later to the top division in the league the Senior Division One. The period of time in the top division was short lived, as they only spent the single season there, before being relegated back to Division Two. The club regained promotion back to the top division at the end of the 1961–62 season but could only survive three seasons in the top division, with one of those seasons being called off due to severe weather disruptions.

The club would then spend the next 30 seasons in the lower two senior divisions before it achieved promotion again to the top division of the league at the end of the 1995–96 season. After nine seasons the club was relegated back to Division Two, but gained promotion again two seasons later at the end of the 2006–07 campaign. The club remained in the top division until the end of the 2011–12 season, when they were relegated back to Senior Division Two, however gained promotion the same season.

The Civil Service, along with the Football Association, celebrated their 150th anniversary. As a result, HRH Prince William invited Civil Service to play a Southern Amateur League home game at Buckingham Palace. Polytechnic FC won the game 2–1.

2015–16 and 2016–17 seasons saw the club reach new heights with the 1st XI winning the treble in each season and finally claim the honour of being the League Champions.

== Colours ==
The earliest record of the club's colours is from 1879, when it wore blue and white shirts, the blue described as "light" in 1880. In 1883 they changed to blue and red stripes and in 1889 to cardinal and green, which the club retained until after the Second World War.

== Ground ==
Polytechnic play their home games at University of Westminster Sports Ground, Hartington Road, Chiswick, W4 3UH.

It played its home matches at the Limes, Barnes, London, moving to Merton Hall in Wimbledon in 1885 and a ground near Chiswick railway station in 1906.

== Honours ==
=== League honours ===
- Spartan League Division One Western:
  - Runners Up (1): 1951–52
- Southern Amateur Football League Senior Division One :
  - Winners (1): 2015–16, 2016–17, 2017–18
  - Runners-up (1): 1999–00, 2018–19
- Southern Amateur Football League Senior Division Two :
  - Winners (4): 1958–59, 1961–62, 2006–07, 2012–2013
  - Runners-up (1): 1995–96
- Southern Amateur Football League Senior Division Three :
  - Winners (1): 1955–56
  - Runners-up (2): 1975–76, 1980–81

=== Cup honours ===
- AFA Senior Cup:
  - Runners-up (2): 2004–05, 2008–09
- AFA Middlesex Senior Cup:
  - Winners (3): 1988–89, 2001–02, 2003–04
  - Runners-up (1): 1914–15
- Southern Amateur League Senior Cup:
  - Winners (1): 2015–16, 2016–17, 2018–19
- London Banks Challenge Cup:
  - Winners (3): 1959–60, 1961–62, 1982–83

== Records ==
=== Hanover United FC ===
- FA Cup best performance: Third round, 1884–85

=== Polytechnic FC ===
- FA Cup best performance: Fourth qualifying round, 1892–93
- Highest League Position: 6th in Spartan League 1913–14

== Former coaches ==
1. Managers/Coaches that have played/managed in the football league or any foreign equivalent to this level (i.e. fully professional league).
2. Managers/Coaches with international caps.
- (England) Hugh Lindsay
- (New Zealand) Jeremy Seales
- (New Zealand) Geoff Brown
