= Alf Turner =

English footballer

Personal information
- Full name: Alfred Docwra Turner
- Date of birth: 25 June 1879
- Place of birth: Islington, England
- Date of death: 1926 (aged 46–47)
- Position: Winger

Senior career*
Years	Team	Apps	(Gls)
1895–1896	Old Rossallians		
1896–1897	West Herts		
1897–1898	Crouch End Vampires		
1898–1899	Watford		
1899–1902	Upton Park		
1902–1903	Nottingham Forest	9	(0)
1903	Notts Magdala Amateurs		
1903–1905	Crouch End Vampires		
1905	Bristol City	1	(0)
1905	Bath City		
1905	Upton Park		
1906	Crouch End Vampires		
Total		10	(0)
- * Club domestic league appearances and goals

Alfred Docwra Turner (25 June 1879–1926) was an English footballer who played in the Football League for Bristol City and Nottingham Forest.
