= Winchmore Hill F.C. =

Amateur London football club

- Full name: Winchmore Hill Football Club
- Founded: 1920; 106 years ago
- Ground: Paulin Ground, Winchmore Hill
- Chairman: Martin Brannigan
- League: Southern Amateur League Senior Division 3
- 2024–25: Southern Amateur League Senior Division 1, 9th of 10 (relegated)
- Website: https://www.winchmorehillfc.co.uk

Winchmore Hill Football Club is an amateur football club based in north London, United Kingdom. They are currently members of the Southern Amateur League Senior Division 3 and play at the Paulin Ground in Winchmore Hill.

== History ==
The club was established in 1920 as part of Winchmore Hill Cricket Club, with the football side playing at the same ground. A club with the same name had previously existed between 1903 and 1914. After playing friendlies for a year, the club joined the Middlesex County Amateur League. They won the league at the first attempt, also winning the Middlesex County Charity Cup. The club then transferred to Division B of the Southern Olympian League, which they won in 1923–24, earning promotion to the league's top division. They won the AFA Middlesex Senior Cup in 1926–27 and were league champions the following season.

After winning the Southern Olympian League, Winchmore Hill were elected to Division Three the Southern Amateur League. They were Division Three runners-up in their first season, earning promotion to Division Two. After World War II, the club were placed in Division One. They were Division Two B champions in 1946–47, a title win that preceded a decade of success. They were league champions in 1946–47 and retained the title for the next two seasons, before winning it again in 1950–51 and 1951–52. After being joint winners of the AFA Senior Cup in 1952–53, the club were Division One champions again in 1955–56.

Winchmore Hill won the AFA Senior Cup in 1959–60, but were relegated to Division Two at the end of the 1963–64 season. However, they were Division Two champions in 1966–67 to earn promotion back to Division One, and won the Division One title the following season. The club won the league again in 1983–84 and the AFA Middlesex Senior Cup in 1992–93, but were relegated to Division Two after finishing bottom of Division One in 1996–96. They were relegated to Division Three at the end of the 1998–99 season, but were Division Three runners-up the following season, earning an immediate promotion back to Division Two.

In 2002–03 Winchmore Hill were AFA Senior Cup winners and Division Two champions, earning promotion to Division One. After finishing as runners-up in Division One in 2004–05, the club won the Senior Cup again in 2005–05 and 2009–10, before winning both the AFA Senior Cup and the AFA Middlesex/Essex Senior Cup in 2011–12. After finishing as runners-up in the league in 2012–13 and 2013–14 (a season in which they also won the AFA Middlesex/Essex Senior Cup again), the club were Division One champions in 2014–15 and Southern Amateur League Senior Cup winners in 2017–18.

== Ground ==
The club has played at the Paulin Ground since their foundation. Initially the cricket pavilion was used as changing rooms by the home team, with away teams using corrugated iron sheds, before a new pavilion was opened in 1923. The first team moved to a new pitch in 1946.

== Honours ==
- Southern Amateur League
  - Senior Division One champions 1947–48, 1948–49, 1950–51, 1951–52, 1954–55, 1955–56, 1967–68, 1983–84, 2014–15
  - Division Two champions 1966–67, 2002–03
  - Division Two B champions 1946–47
  - Senior Cup winners 2017–18
- Southern Olympian League
  - Division B champions 1923–24
- Middlesex County Amateur League
  - Champions 1921–22
- AFA Senior Cup
  - Winners 1952–53, 1959–60, 2002–03, 2005–06, 2009–10, 2011–12
- AFA Middlesex/Essex Senior Cup
  - Winners 2011–12, 2013–14
- AFA Middlesex Senior Cup
  - Winners 1926–27, 1992–93
- Middlesex Charity Cup
  - Winners 1921–22

== Records ==
- Best FA Vase performance: First round, 1983–84
