= Old Malvernians F.C. =

Association football club in England

Old Malvernians
- Full name: Old Malvernians Football Club
- Founded: 1897
- Ground: Brunel University, Uxbridge
- League: Arthurian League; Division One
- 2017-18: Arthurian League; First Division, 6th
Home colours	Away colours

Old Malvernians F.C. is a football club based at Chelsea Training Centre in Cobham, Surrey, England. The members of the club are old boys of Malvern College, in Malvern, Worcestershire, England. They play in the Arthurian League. The team has reached the final of the Arthur Dunn Cup a record 31 times and won the cup 15 times, second only to the Old Carthusians.

== History ==
The club was formed in 1897 and competed in the FA Amateur Cup that year, making it to the semi-finals before losing to Uxbridge 1–0.

In the 1901–02 season, the club won the FA Amateur Cup, when they beat Bishop Auckland 5–1 in the final. The following season the club picked up the London Senior Cup, when they beat Clapton in the final 4–2. They also won the AFA Senior Cup in 1911.

The club became one of the founder members of the Arthurian League, and won the Premier Division five times between 1963 and 1970.

== Team colours ==
The club's traditional colours are those of the Old Malvernian Club: black, blue and red, however teams often play in the school colours of green and white halved shirts.

== Ground ==
Old Malvernians play their home games at Chelsea Training Centre, 62 Stoke Road, Stoke D'Abernon, Cobham, Surrey, KT11 3PT.

== Honours ==
=== League honours ===
- Arthurian League Premier Division :
  - winners (5): 1963–64, 1964–65, 1967–68, 1968–69, 1969–70
- Arthurian League Division One:
  - winners (1): 2007–08

=== Cup honours ===
- FA Amateur Cup:
  - winners (1): 1901–02
- AFA Senior Cup:
  - winners (1): 1910–11
- London Senior Cup:
  - winners (1): 1902–03
- Arthur Dunn Cup :
  - winners (excluding wins before 1960) (8): 1964–65, 1967–68 (shared with Old Reptonians), 1968–69, 1970–71, 1974–75, 1975–76, 1977–78, 1988–89

== Former players ==
A list of players that have played for the club at one stage and meet one of the following criteria;

1. Players that have played/managed in the football league or any foreign equivalent to this level (i.e. fully professional league).
2. Players with full international caps.
3. Has achieved notability in football through playing a significant role in the administration of the game.
- (England) Cuthbert Burnup
- (England) Rex Corbett
- (England) Samuel Day
- (England) R. E. Foster
- (England) Joe Mears

== See also ==
- List of Old Malvernians
