= 1911–12 Isthmian League =

The 1911–12 season was the seventh in the history of the Isthmian League, an English football competition.

Tunbridge Wells and Woking joined the league this season. London Caledonians were champions, winning their third Isthmian League title.

== League table ==
Isthmian League
- Season: 1911–12
- Champions: London Caledonians
- Matches: 110
- Goals: 381 (3.46 per match)

Pos	Team	Pld	W	D	L	GF	GA	GR	Pts
1	London Caledonians	20	11	7	2	39	25	1.560	29
2	Ilford	20	11	3	6	37	24	1.542	25
3	Nunhead	20	10	5	5	36	30	1.200	25
4	Dulwich Hamlet	20	8	5	7	33	23	1.435	21
5	West Norwood	20	9	3	8	38	38	1.000	21
6	Clapton	20	7	5	8	37	37	1.000	19
7	Woking	20	7	5	8	38	41	0.927	19
8	Shepherd's Bush	20	5	6	9	39	49	0.796	16
9	Leytonstone	20	5	6	9	28	38	0.737	16
10	Oxford City	20	5	5	10	33	36	0.917	15
11	Tunbridge Wells	20	5	4	11	23	40	0.575	14

Source: fchd.com rsssf.com
Rules for classification: 1) points; 2) goal ratio.
