= London Senior Cup =

- Founded: 1882; 144 years ago
- Region: Greater London
- Current champions: QPR Dev Squad (1st title)
- Most championships: Walthamstow Avenue (9 titles)
- Website: The Official Website of the London Football Association

The London Senior Cup is the County Senior Cup of the London FA. The London Senior Cup was first won by Upton Park in 1882. Although the leading professional sides in London no longer compete, the Cup has been won in the past by the likes of Arsenal (as Royal Arsenal in 1891), Brentford, Wimbledon and Barnet. The current champions are Queens Park Rangers.

== Finals ==
This section lists every final of the competition played since 1893, the winners, the runners-up, and the result.

=== Key ===
Match went to a replay
Match went to extra time
Match decided by a penalty shootout after extra time
Shared trophy

Season	Ground	Winners	Result	Runner-up	Notes	Att.
1882–83	Kennington Oval	Upton Park	4–0	Old Foresters		
1883–84	Kennington Oval	Upton Park	4–1	Old Foresters		2,000
1884–85	Kennington Oval	Old Foresters	2–1	Upton Park		2,000
1885–86	Kennington Oval	Ashburnham Rovers	2–1	Hotspur		
1886–87	Kennington Oval	Old Westminsters; Casuals	1–1		Trophy shared.	400
1887–88	Kennington Oval	Old Westminsters	1–0	Casuals		
1888–89	Kennington Oval	Clapton	4–2	Casuals		3,000
1889–90	Kennington Oval	Old Westminsters	1–0	Royal Arsenal		5,000
1890–91	Kennington Oval	Royal Arsenal	6–0	St Bartholomew's Hospitals		5,500
1891–92	Kennington Oval	Old Westminsters	2–1	Ilford		8,000
1892–93	Kennington Oval	Old Westminsters	3–0	Casuals		6,000
1893–94	Essex County Ground, Leyton	Old Foresters	2–1	Old Carthusians		3,000
1894–95	Queen's Club, West Kensington	Old Carthusians	6–0	Casuals		2,000
1895–96	Essex County Ground, Leyton	Old Carthusians	3–1	Casuals		2,000
1896–97	Caledonian Park, Holloway	Old Carthusians	5–2	Ilford		3,708
1897–98	Essex County Ground, Leyton	Brentford	0-0	Ilford	Game was abandoned	1,500
1897–98	Essex County Ground, Leyton	Brentford	5–1	Ilford		4,000
1898–99	Essex County Ground, Leyton	Old Carthusians	2–1	London Caledonians		4,000
1899–00	Spotted Dog, Forest Gate	London Caledonians	1–0	Old Westminsters		3,500
1900–01	Campdale Road, Tufnell Park	Ilford	2–1	Clapton		4,172
1901–02	Campdale Road, Tufnell Park	Civil Service	3–2	Shepherd's Bush		4,000
1902–03	Campdale Road, Tufnell Park	Old Malvernians	4–2	Clapton		6,000
1903–04	Essex County Ground, Leyton	Leyton	1–0	Ilford		5,000
1904–05	Campdale Road, Tufnell Park	Ilford	2–1	Ealing Association		5,000
1905–06	Herne Hill	New Crusaders	2-2	Dulwich Hamlet		10,500
1905–06	Herne Hill	New Crusaders	3–1	Dulwich Hamlet	Replay	8,000
1906–07	Spotted Dog, Forest Gate	West Norwood	4–1	West Hampstead		2,000
1907–08	Herne Hill	London Caledonians	1–0	Dulwich Hamlet		5,000
1908–09	Herne Hill	Clapton	1–0	Nunhead		4,000
1909–10	Herne Hill	Bromley	1–0	Clapton		4,000
1910–11	Vicarage Field, Barking	Clapton	2–0	Ilford		4,000
1911–12	Spotted Dog, Forest Gate	Barking	3–0	London Caledonians		4,500
1912–13	Brown's Ground, Nunhead	Tufnell Park	2–0	Metrogas		4,000
1913–14	Champion Hill, Dulwich	Ilford	1-1	Nunhead		4,000
1913–14	Spotted Dog, Forest Gate	Ilford	2–0	Nunhead	Replay	4,000
1914–15	Newbury Park, Ilford	London Caledonians	4–1	Clapton		2,000
1915–19	No competition held due to World War I.					
1919–20	Boleyn Ground, Upton Park	Leytonstone	5–2	Barking Town		15,800
1920–21	The Den, New Cross	Barking Town	4–1	Dulwich Hamlet		15,000
1921–22	Boleyn Ground, Upton Park	Ilford	3–1	Nunhead		15,000
1922–23	The Den, New Cross	Nunhead	1–0	Bromley		12,000
1923–24	The Den, New Cross	Tufnell Park	2–1	Kingstonian		7,500
1924–25	The Den, New Cross	Dulwich Hamlet	2–0	Clapton		12,000
1925–26	Plough Lane, Wimbledon	London Caledonians	3–2	Kingstonian		6,000
1926–27	Boleyn Ground, Upton Park	Barking Town	4–2	London Caledonians		11,000
1927–28	The Den, New Cross	London Caledonians	2–0	Dulwich Hamlet		
1928–29	Boleyn Ground, Upton Park	Ilford	4–1	London Caledonians		12,000
1929–30	Boleyn Ground, Upton Park	Ilford	4–1	Walthamstow Avenue		18,000
1930–31	Selhurst Park	Wimbledon	1–0	Kingstonian		10,000
1931–32	Boleyn Ground, Upton Park	Hayes	3–1	Ilford		
1932–33	Newbury Park, Ilford	Finchley	2–0	Barnet		
1933–34	Boleyn Ground, Upton Park	Wimbledon	1-1	Leyton	After extra-time	5,000
1933–34	Champion Hill, Dulwich	Wimbledon	2–1	Leyton	Replay	
1934–35	Hare & Hounds, Leyton	Enfield	2–0	Metropolitan Police		
1935–36	Newbury Park, Ilford	Walthamstow Avenue	1–0	Golders Green	After extra-time, 0-0	4,000
1936–37	Boleyn Ground, Upton Park	Walthamstow Avenue	6–3	Hayes		
1937–38	Arsenal Stadium, Highbury	Barnet	4–0	Leyton		8,932
1938–39	The Den, New Cross	Dulwich Hamlet	3–0	Erith & Belvedere		14,000
1939–40	Boleyn Ground, Upton Park	Walthamstow Avenue	5–0	Wealdstone		
1940–41	Green Pond Road, Walthamstow	Barnet	2–0	Metropolitan Police		
1941–42	Green Pond Road, Walthamstow	Walthamstow Avenue	1-1	Barnet	No extra-time	4,000
1941–42	The Underhill, Barnet	Walthamstow Avenue	3–0	Barnet	Replay	5,000
1942–43	The Den, New Cross	Tooting & Mitcham United	5–4	Dulwich Hamlet		
1943–44	Boleyn Ground, Upton Park	Walthamstow Avenue	4–3	Tooting & Mitcham United		
1944–45	Champion Hill, Dulwich	Erith & Belvedere	5–3	Tooting & Mitcham United		
1945–46	Champion Hill, Dulwich	Bromley	2–0	Leyton		
1946–47	Griffin Park, Brentford	Barnet	2–0	Kingstonian		25,000
1947–48	Newbury Park, Ilford	Leytonstone	2–0	Edgware Town		
1948–49	Selhurst Park	Tooting & Mitcham United	3–2	Bromley		
1949–50	Arsenal Stadium, Highbury	Dulwich Hamlet	3–1	Hounslow Town		13,809
1950–51	Arsenal Stadium, Highbury	Bromley	4–3	Hendon	After extra-time	11,078
1951–52	Arsenal Stadium, Highbury	Finchley	1–0	Wealdstone		11,919
1952–53	Champion Hill, Dulwich	Finchley; Walthamstow Avenue	2–2		After extra-time. Trophy shared.	
1953–54	Arsenal Stadium, Highbury	Ilford	2–0	Hounslow Town		
1954–55	Arsenal Stadium, Highbury	Walthamstow Avenue	3–2	Hendon		10,000
1955–56	Newbury Park, Ilford	Briggs Sports	3–1	Wembley		
1956–57	Arsenal Stadium, Highbury	Briggs Sports	3–0	Corinthian-Casuals		
1957–58	Plough Lane, Wimbledon	Sutton United	2–1	Finchley		
1958–59	Arsenal Stadium, Highbury	Tooting & Mitcham United	5–2	Hendon		6,286
1959–60	The Den, New Cross	Tooting & Mitcham United	5–0	Bromley		
1960–61	Arsenal Stadium, Highbury	Enfield	3–0	Wealdstone		3,448
1961–62	Champion Hill, Dulwich	Wimbledon	1–1	Wealdstone	After extra-time, 0-0. Trophy shared.	4,000
1962–63	Church Road, Hayes	Kingstonian	2–1	Barnet		
1963–64	Lower Mead, Wealdstone	Hendon	1–0	Enfield		
1964–65	Brisbane Road, Leyton Orient	Kingstonian	2–1	Dagenham		
1965–66	Boleyn Ground, Upton Park	Leytonstone	4–3	Walthamstow Avenue		
1966–67	Boleyn Ground, Upton Park	Enfield	2–0	Walthamstow Avenue		
1967–68	Brisbane Road, Leyton Orient	Dagenham	1–0	Enfield		
1968–69	The Underhill, Barnet	Hendon	1–0	Dagenham		1,014
1969–70	Southbury Road, Enfield	Hitchin Town	4–2	St Albans City		1,809
1970–71	The Underhill, Barnet	St Albans City	1–0	Enfield	After extra-time, 0-0	
1971–72	Lower Mead, Wealdstone	Enfield	2–0	Hendon		1,341
1972–73	The Underhill, Barnet	Enfield	1-1	Hitchin Town	After extra-time	
1972–73	Lower Mead, Wealdstone	Enfield	3–1	Hitchin Town	Replay	
1973–74	Champion Hill, Dulwich	Bishop's Stortford	4–1	Walton & Hersham		
1974–75	Champion Hill, Dulwich	Wimbledon	2–0	Leatherhead		3,281
1975–76	Champion Hill, Dulwich	Enfield	4–1	Barking		
1976–77	Champion Hill, Dulwich	Wimbledon	0-0	Staines Town	After extra-time, 0-0	
1976–77	Champion Hill, Dulwich	Wimbledon	1–0	Staines Town	Replay	
1977–78	Champion Hill, Dulwich	Walthamstow Avenue	1–0	Leatherhead		
1978–79	Sandy Lane, Mitcham	Barking	3–0	Croydon		
1979–80	Victoria Road, Dagenham	Leytonstone-Ilford	3–2	Barking		
1980–81	Green Pond Road, Walthamstow	Hayes	2–0	Staines Town		
1981–82	Champion Hill, Dulwich	Leytonstone-Ilford	0-0	Farnborough	After extra-time, 0-0	
1981–82	Champion Hill, Dulwich	Leytonstone-Ilford	1–0	Farnborough	Replay	
1982–83	Champion Hill, Dulwich	Sutton United	1–0	Woking		
1983–84	Imber Court, East Molesey	Dulwich Hamlet	2-2	Kingstonian	After extra-time, 2-2	
1983–84	Imber Court, East Molesey	Dulwich Hamlet	3–2	Kingstonian	Replay	720
1984–85	Champion Hill, Dulwich	Fisher Athletic	2–0	Bromley		
1985–86	Griffin Park, Brentford	Walthamstow Avenue	2–1	Finchley	After extra-time, 1-1	
1986–87	Southbury Road, Enfield	Kingstonian	2–1	Hampton		
1987–88	Surrey Docks Stadium, Rotherhithe	Fisher Athletic	2-2	Hampton	After extra-time, 1-1	
1987–88	Beveree Stadium, Hampton	Fisher Athletic	2–1	Hampton	Replay	
1988–89	Champion Hill, Dulwich	Fisher Athletic	1–0	Clapton		
1989–90	Plough Lane, Wimbledon	Welling United	2–0	Boreham Wood		
1990–91	Reynolds Field, Perivale	Haringey Borough	1–0	Walthamstow Pennant		
1991–92	King George's Field, Tolworth	Hanwell Town	2-2	Croydon Athletic	After extra-time, 1-1	
1991–92	King George's Field, Tolworth	Hanwell Town	4–3	Croydon Athletic	Replay. After extra-time, 3-3	
1992–93	Harry Abrahams Stadium, Finchley	Hanwell Town	4–3	Brimsdown Rovers		
1993–94	Hare & Hounds, Leyton	Ford United	2–1	Hanwell Town		
1994–95	Harry Abrahams Stadium, Finchley	Wingate & Finchley	4–3	Tower Hamlets		
1995–96	Champion Hill, Dulwich	Tottenham Omada	2–1	Kingsbury Town		
1996–97	Imber Court, East Molesey	Barkingside	2–0	Hillingdon Borough		
1997–98	Claremont Road, Hendon	Ford United	2–0	Southall		
1998–99	Champion Hill, Dulwich	Waltham Abbey	3–2	Bedfont		
1999–00	Harry Abrahams Stadium, Finchley	Bedfont	5–1	Erith Town		
2000–01	Brisbane Road, Leyton Orient	Ford United	3–2	Croydon Athletic		
2001–02	Brisbane Road, Leyton Orient	Croydon	2–1	Dulwich Hamlet		
2002–03	Victoria Road, Dagenham	Bromley	1–0	Ford United		242
2003–04	Kingsmeadow, Kingston upon Thames	Dulwich Hamlet	2–0	Tooting & Mitcham United		
2004–05	Imber Court, East Molesey	Fisher Athletic	4–0	Wingate & Finchley		
2005–06	Imperial Fields, Mitcham	Fisher Athletic	3–2	Hendon		276
2006–07	Imperial Fields, Mitcham	Tooting & Mitcham United	3–2	Bromley		710
2007–08	Imber Court, East Molesey	Tooting & Mitcham United	3–2	Hendon		352
2008–09	Kingsmeadow, Kingston upon Thames	Hendon	2–2	Croydon Athletic	After extra-time, 1-1, 3-1 on pens	291
2009–10	Earlsmead Stadium, Harrow	Metropolitan Police	4–4	AFC Wimbledon	After extra-time, 3-3, 4-3 on pens	676
2010–11	Imperial Fields, Mitcham	Wingate & Finchley	3–1	Hendon		253
2011–12	Imber Court, East Molesey	Hendon	2–0	Kingstonian		344
2012–13	Imber Court, East Molesey	Bromley	2–1	Kingstonian		469
2013–14	Imber Court, East Molesey	AFC Wimbledon	2–1	Metropolitan Police		541
2014–15	Imber Court, East Molesey	Hendon	3–2	Tooting & Mitcham United	After extra-time, 1-1	407
2015–16	Imber Court, East Molesey	Tooting & Mitcham United	2–0	Hendon		480
2016–17	Champion Hill, Dulwich	Cray Valley Paper Mills	2–1	Metropolitan Police		162
2017–18	Silver Jubilee Park, Kingsbury	Balham	4–1	Cray Valley Paper Mills		180
2018–19	Maurice Rebak Stadium, Finchley	Welling United	1–0	Brentford B		317
2019–20	Reynolds Field, Perivale	Hendon	1–0	Brentford B	After extra-time, 0-0	400
2020–21	Silver Jubilee Park, Kingsbury	Tooting & Mitcham United	2–1	AFC Wimbledon		561
2021–22	Champion Hill, Dulwich	Brentford B	1–1	Hendon	After extra-time, 1-1, 3-0 on pens	400
2022–23	Silver Jubilee Park, Kingsbury	Charlton Athletic Reserves	5–3	Haringey Borough	After extra-time	487
2023–24	Champion Hill, Dulwich	Charlton Athletic Reserves	2–1	Hendon		229
2024–25	Reynolds Field, Perivale	Hanwell Town	3–0	Brentford B		463
2025–26	Champion Hill, Dulwich	QPR Dev Squad	5–1	Dulwich Hamlet		2,880

=== Wins by teams ===
Club	Wins	First final won	Last final won	Runner-up	Last final lost	Total final apps.	Notes
Walthamstow Avenue	9	1935–36	1985–86	3	1966–67	12	(Note: Dissolved in 1988. Merged with Leytonstone-Ilford. Shared one trophy with Finchley.)
Tooting & Mitcham United	8	1942–43	2020–21	4	2014–15	12	
Ilford	7	1900–01	1953–54	5	1931–32	12	(Note: Merged with Leytonstone in 1979 to form Leytonstone-Ilford. Reformed in 1987.)
Hendon	6	1963–64	2019–20	9	2023–24	15	
Enfield	6	1934–35	1975–76	4	1970–71	10	
Old Westminsters	6	1885–86	1892–93	1	1899–00	7	(Note: Won one title as Ashburham Rovers. One trophy shared with Casuals.)
Dulwich Hamlet	5	1924–25	2003–04	7	2025-26	12	
Bromley	5	1909–10	2012–13	5	2006–07	10	
London Caledonians	5	1899–00	1927–28	4	1928–29	9	(Note: Dissolved in 1939.)
Wimbledon	5	1930–31	1977–76	0	–	5	(Note: Dissolved in 2002. Recolated to Milton Keynes to form MK Dons.)
Fisher Athletic	5	1984–85	2005–06	0	–	5	(Note: Dissolved in 2009.)
Barking	4	1911–12	1978–79	3	1979–80	7	(Note: Won two times as Barking Town.)
Old Carthusians	4	1894–95	1898–99	1	1893–94	5	
Kingstonian	3	1962–63	1986–87	7	2012–14	10	
Clapton	3	1888–89	1910–11	6	1988–89	9	
Barnet	3	1937–38	1946–47	3	1962–63	6	
Finchley	3	1932–33	1952–53	2	1985–86	5	(Note: Dissolved in 1991. Shared one trophy with Walthamstow Avenue.)
Ford United	3	1993–94	2000–01	1	2002–03	4	
Hanwell Town	3	1991–92	2024-25	1	1993–94	4	
Leytonstone	3	1919–20	1965–66	0	–	3	(Note: Merged with Ilford in 1979 to form Leystonstone-Ilford.)
Old Foresters	2	1884–85	1893–94	2	1883–84	4	
Upton Park	2	1882–83	1883–84	1	1884–85	3	(Note: Dissolved in 1911.)
Hayes	2	1931–32	1980–81	1	1936–37	3	(Note: Dissolved in 2007.)
Wingate & Finchley	2	1994–95	2010–11	1	2004–05	3	
Tufnell Park	2	1912–13	1923–24	0	–	2	(Note: Dissolved in 1950.)
Briggs Sports	2	1955–56	1956–57	0	–	2	(Note: Dissolved in 1959.)
Sutton United	2	1957–58	1982–83	0	–	2	
Leytonstone-Ilford	2	1979–80	1981–82	0	–	2	(Note: Merged with Dagenham in 1992 to form Dagenham & Redbridge.)
Welling United	2	1989–90	2018–19	0	–	2	
Charlton Athletic Reserves	2	2022–23	2023–24	0	–	2	
Casuals	1	1886–87	1886–87	5	1895–96	6	(Note: Dissolved in 1939. Merged with Corinthian to form Corinthian-Casuals. One trophy shared with Old Westminsters.)
Metropolitan Police	1	2009–10	2009–10	4	2016–17	5	
Leyton	1	1903–04	1903–04	3	1945–46	4	(Note: Dissolved in 2011.)
Nunhead	1	1922–23	1922–23	3	1921–22	4	(Note: Dissolved in 1949.)
Wealdstone	1	1961-62	1961-62	3	1960-61	4	
Brentford B	1	2021-22	2021-22	3	2024-25	4	
Dagenham	1	1967–68	1967–68	2	1968–69	3	(Note: Dissolved in 1992. Merged with Redbridge Forest to form Dagenham & Redbridge.)
AFC Wimbledon	1	2013–14	2013–14	2	2020–21	3	
Cray Valley Paper Mills	1	2016–17	2016–17	1	2017–18	2	
Royal Arsenal	1	1890–91	1890–91	1	1889–90	2	
Erith & Belvedere	1	1944–45	1944–45	1	1938–39	2	
Hitchin Town	1	1969–70	1969–70	1	1972–73	2	
St Albans City	1	1970–71	1970–71	1	1969–70	2	
Haringey Borough	1	1990–91	1990–91	1	2022–23	2	
Bedfont	1	1999–00	1999–00	1	1998–99	2	(Note: Dissolved in 2010.)
Croydon	1	2001–02	2001–02	1	1978–79	2	
Brentford	1	1897–98	1897–98	0	-	1	
Civil Service	1	1901–02	1901–02	0	–	1	
Old Malvernians	1	1902–03	1902–03	0	–	1	
New Crusaders	1	1905–06	1905–06	0	–	1	(Note: Dissolved in 1915.)
West Norwood	1	1906–07	1906–07	0	–	1	(Note: Dissolved in 1939.)
Bishop's Stortford	1	1973–74	1973–74	0	–	1	
Tottenham Omada	1	1995–96	1995–96	0	–	1	(Note: Dissolved in mid-season of 1997–98 Spartan South Midlands Football League.)
Barkingside	1	1996–97	1996–97	0	–	1	
Waltham Abbey	1	1998–99	1998–99	0	–	1	
Balham	1	2017–18	2017–18	0	–	1	
QPR Dev Squad	1	2025-26	2025-26	0	–	1	

=== Titles by years ===
Club	Wins	Winning years
Walthamstow Avenue	9	1935–36, 1936–37, 1939–40, 1941–42, 1943–44, 1952-53 (Shared), 1954–55, 1977–78, 1985–86
Tooting & Mitcham United	8	1942–43, 1948–49, 1958–59, 1959–60, 2006–07, 2007–08, 2015–16, 2020–21
Ilford	7	1900–01, 1904–05, 1913–14, 1921–22, 1928–29, 1929–30, 1953–54
Enfield	6	1934–35, 1960–61, 1966–67, 1971–72, 1972–73, 1975–76
Hendon	6	1963–64, 1968–69, 2008–09, 2011–12, 2014–15, 2019–20
Old Westminsters	5	1886–87 (Shared), 1887–88, 1889–90, 1891–92, 1892–93
London Caledonians	5	1899–1900, 1907–08, 1914–15, 1925–26, 1927–28
Bromley	5	1909–10, 1945–46, 1950–51, 2002–03, 2012–13
Dulwich Hamlet	5	1924–25, 1938–39, 1949–50, 1983–84, 2003–04
Fisher Athletic	5	1984–85, 1987–88, 1988–89, 2004–05, 2005–06
Wimbledon	5	1930–31, 1933–34, 1961–62 (Shared), 1974–75, 1976–77
Old Carthusians	4	1894–95, 1895–96, 1896–97, 1898–99
Barking	4	1911–12, 1920–21, 1926–27, 1978–79
Clapton	3	1888–89, 1908–09, 1910–11
Leytonstone.	3	1919–20, 1947–48, 1965–66
Finchley	3	1932–33, 1951–52, 1952–53 (Shared)
Barnet	3	1937–38, 1940–41, 1946–47
Kingstonian	3	1962–63, 1964–65, 1986–87
Ford United	3	1993–94, 1997–98, 2000–01
Hanwell Town	3	1991–92, 1992–93, 2024-25
Upton Park	2	1882–83, 1883–84
Old Foresters	2	1884–85, 1893–94
Tufnell Park	2	1912–13, 1923–24
Hayes	2	1931–32, 1980–81
Briggs Sports	2	1955–56, 1956–57
Sutton United	2	1957–58, 1982–83
Leytonstone-Ilford	2	1979–80, 1981–82
Wingate & Finchley	2	1994–95, 2010–11
Welling United	2	1989–90, 2018–19
Charlton Athletic Reserves	2	2022–23, 2023–24
Ashburnham Rovers F.C.	1	1885–86
Casuals	1	1887–88 (Shared)
Royal Arsenal	1	1890–91
Brentford	1	1897–98
Civil Service	1	1901–02
Old Malvernians	1	1902–03
New Crusaders	1	1905–06
Leyton	1	1903–04
West Norwood	1	1906–07
Nunhead	1	1922–23
Erith & Belvedere	1	1944–45
Wealdstone	1	1961-62 (Shared)
Dagenham	1	1967–68
Hitchin Town	1	1969–70
St Albans City	1	1970–71
Bishop's Stortford	1	1973–74
Haringey Borough	1	1990–91
Tottenham Omada	1	1995–96
Barkingside	1	1996–97
Waltham Abbey	1	1998–99
Bedfont	1	1999–2000
Croydon	1	2001–02
Metropolitan Police	1	2009–10
AFC Wimbledon	1	2013–14
Cray Valley Paper Mills	1	2016–17
Balham	1	2017–18
Brentford B	1	2021–22
QPR Dev Squad	1	2025-26
