= Civil Service F.C. =

English association football club and former rugby union club in London

Civil Service
- Full name: Civil Service Football Club
- Founded: 1863; 163 years ago
- Ground: Kings House Sports Ground, Chiswick
- Chairman: Jim Kellett
- 1st XI Manager: John Sewell
- League: Southern Amateur League Senior Division 1
- 2025–26: Southern Amateur League Senior Division 1, 5th of 10
- Website: http://www.civilservicefc.com/
Home colours	Away colours

Civil Service Football Club is an English football club based in London. The club originally played both association football and rugby football and the Civil Service, along with Blackheath F.C., is one of the two clubs that can claim to be a founder member of both the Football Association and the Rugby Football Union. However, the rugby club is now a distinct entity and appears to have been so since the late nineteenth century. They are currently members of the Southern Amateur League Senior Division 1.

== History ==
In 1863 the newly formed Civil Service club was playing football under both Association and Rugby rules, and sources suggest that the club was similar to Clapham Rovers in that it was a single club playing both codes. It is not clear when the Civil Service Rugby Club became a distinct entity from the association football club. The histories published by the respective clubs do not refer to a joint history past 1863, but the club was still a unified entity when it became a founding member of the Rugby Football Union in 1871 (although it did not provide a member to the inaugural committee). In 1892, contemporary sources refer to Clapham Rovers as being unique in playing both codes, suggesting that the Civil Service had distinct teams by that point.

=== Association football ===
The club was one of the eleven founding sides of the Football Association (FA) on 26 October 1863, and lays claim to an earlier, but uncertain, date of origin. It was represented at the founder's meeting by Mr. Warne of the War Office, leading to the side often being identified as the War Office Club in historical accounts of the FA's founding. Civil Service was also one of the fifteen entrants to the first ever FA Cup competition in 1871–72.

Several members of the Civil Service took a prominent role in organising the first representative matches between sides representing England and Scotland in 1870. The captain of the first Scottish XI was James Kirkpatrick (later Sir James Kirkpatrick, 8th Baronet) who included fellow civil servants Charles and William Baillie-Hamilton and William Lindsay in the team, while the England XI included William C. Butler and Evelyn Freeth.

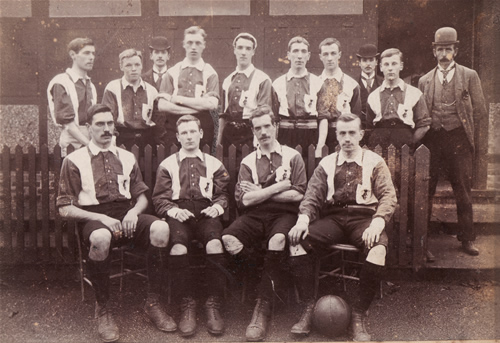
The Civil Service team of 1893

Civil Service played a significant role in the introduction and popularisation of the game of football in Europe early in the 1900s through touring, undertaking their first continental tour in 1901. In recognition of its contributions, the club is an honorary life member of Real Madrid and Slavia Prague. Civil Service first played Real Madrid in Madrid in 1921, drawing 1-1 before losing 2-7 a few days later. Both sides met again in Madrid in 1924 with Civil Service winning both games.

Early in the club's history, the decision was taken to remain an amateur side in the face of the emergence of the professional game. Civil Service was subsequently active in the formation of several amateur leagues, including the Amateur Football Alliance, the Isthmian League (1906), and the Southern Amateur Football League (1907).

CSFC enjoyed its greatest success in the years leading up to World War I, with several wins in other cup competitions to its credit including the London Senior Cup (1901), the Middlesex Senior Cup (1908 and 1913), and the Amateur Football Association Cup (1910, and again later in 1920 and 1930). They also captured the Southern Amateur League (SAL) title in 1913 and 1914. In later years, the club's accumulation of honours was modest with a SAL title in 1939 and two more league triumphs in 1969 and 1971. They captured the AFA Senior Cup in 1997 with a 4–3 win over Lensbury, securing the trophy for the first time in 67 years.

The club has six sides competing in the Southern Amateur League and a two Vets side playing in the West London Veterans League. It has also established a women's section which continues to grow.

The club played in the first ever official football match at Buckingham Palace in October 2013, playing Polytechnic F.C., to mark the FA's 150th anniversary.

== Records ==
- Best FA Cup performance: Second round, 1874–75
- Best FA Vase performance: Second round, 1976–77
- Best FA Amateur Cup performance: Semi-finals, 1906–07

== Notable players ==
For notable rugby players, see CS Rugby 1863

- William A. Baillie-Hamilton – Represented Scotland in the second-ever international match in November 1870.
- William Heap Bailey – Represented Scotland in the second-ever international match in November 1870, despite being English.
- Albert Gilbert – Played in the Football League for Brentford.
- C. W. Herbridge – four caps for England amateurs in 1920 in matches against Wales, France, Ireland and Belgium.
- Jimmy McCree – Played in the Football League for Brentford, Fulham and Middlesbrough and won a Scotland amateur cap in 1930.
