= Norsemen F.C. =

Association football club in Edmonton, England

Coordinates: 51°37′48.76″N 0°4′30.1″W

Norsemen
- Full name: Norsemen Football Club
- Nickname: The Norsemen
- Founded: May 1895
- Ground: Edmonton Sports Club, Edmonton
- Chairman: Ronnie Robinson
- League: Southern Amateur League Division One
Home colours

Norsemen Football Club is a football club based in Edmonton, England. They are currently members of the Southern Amateur League and Hertfordshire Senior County League.

== Colours, Crest and Motto ==
Norsemen play in blue with red socks. Their away strip is reversed, comprising red with blue socks. The club crest is that of a Viking and the club motto "Ret Frem" is based on the Norwegian, "Rett Frem", meaning "straightforward", "straight ahead", or "forthright". The club currently runs eight adult men's sides, a comprehensive youth section from U9-U18 and a ladies section.

== History ==
Founded in May 1895, from the ashes of Clapton-based club Orion Gymnasium, Norsemen (or rather, given their remote location in the growing London area – "The Northmen" as they were originally called) played their first game on 28 September 1895, beating Druids 2–1 in Neasden. Norsemen later joined the Southern Amateur League. In 1967, the club won the league, before being relegated to Division Two in 1972. In 1974, Norsemen were promoted back to the top tier of the Southern Amateur League. In 1978, the club entered the FA Vase for the first time, losing 4–3 against Swanley Town F.C. In the 1982–83 edition of the FA Vase, Norsemen reached the third round, their furthest run in the competition. For the 2023/24 season Norsemen will field a side in the Hertfordshire Senior County League.

== Ground ==
Upon the formation of the club, Norsemen played behind the Cross Keys public house in Edmonton Green. In 1896, the club moved to Edmonton Cricket Club, where they remain to the present day.

== Records ==
- Best FA Vase performance: Third round, 1982–83
- AFA Cup winners 1951–52, 1982–83, 1990–91; Runners-up 1938–1939, 2019–20 (Amateur Football Alliance Senior Cup)
- SAL Champions 1966–67, 1997–98 (Southern Amateur Football League#League champions and Cup winners)
