= Richmond & Kew F.C. =

Association football club in England

Coordinates: 51°26′29.65″N 0°19′10.99″W

Richmond & Kew
- Full name: Richmond & Kew Football Club
- Founded: 1906
- Ground: Ham Playing Fields, Ham
- Chairman: Stuart Whitwell
- Manager: Simon Croxford
- League: Surrey Premier County Football League
- Website: https://www.richmondandkewfc.co.uk/
Home colours

Richmond & Kew Football Club is a football club based in Ham, England. They are currently members of the Surrey Premier County Football League.

== History ==
St Anne's Kew were founded in 1906 by St Anne's Church teacher Ken Leatherdale. Initially, the club exclusively featured players from the church, before changing their name to Kew Association in 1911, two years after joining the Middlesex County Amateur League. The club later played in the Amateur Football Association and the Southern Olympian League, before joining the Southern Amateur League in 1925. In the 1976–77 season, the same season the club entered the FA Vase for the first time, Kew Association won the Southern Amateur League. In the 2012–13 season, the club resigned from the Southern Amateur League halfway through the season. The club re-joined the league in time for the following season. In 2020, the club renamed themselves to Richmond & Kew. From 2020/21 to 2023/24 seasons the club also fielded a team in the Surrey South Eastern Combination. The club also has a women's team that competes in the Greater London Women's Football League.

== Ground ==
The club currently play at Ham Playing Fields in Ham in the London Borough of Richmond upon Thames.

== Records ==
- Best FA Vase performance: Third round, 1976–77
