= New Crusaders F.C. =

New Crusaders
- Full name: New Crusaders Football Club
- Nickname(s): the All Whites
- Founded: 1905
- Dissolved: 1915
- Ground: Sidcup Place
- Secretary: A. S. Farnfield
Home colours	change colours

New Crusaders F.C. was an English association football club from Sidcup, Kent which folded in 1915.

== History ==
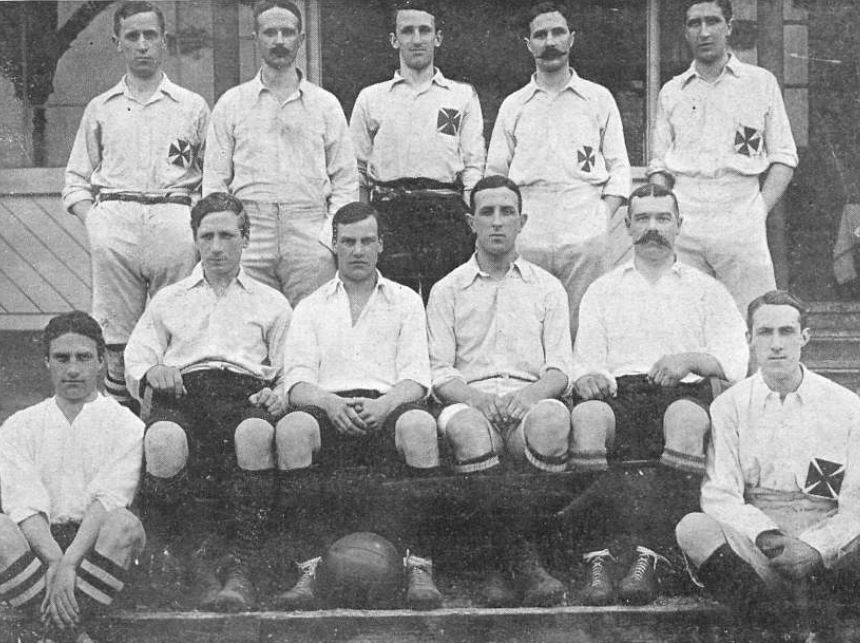
New Crusaders in 1911

The club was founded by six Farnfield brothers (including Percy Farnfield), who had all earned Cambridge blues in football from 1897 to 1903. The club's name came from the brothers' father being a supporter of the former Crusaders club, but a junior side already having registered the Crusaders name with the Football Association.

The club was instantly a power in the amateur game, one of its earliest competitive matches being a 16–0 win over Woking in the 1905–06 FA Cup qualifying rounds. Woking only started with 9 men, and, although a tenth soon joined, for the second half the club secretary (E. T. Engall) had to take the field and played in goal. The Farnfields shared out the 16 goals between them - H.V. and B.S. scoring five each.

The club was a founder member of the Southern Amateur Football League for the 1907–08 season and were Champions in the 5 of the 6 seasons they competed in it up to them joining the Isthmian League for the 1913–14 season. In the 1905–06 and 1906–07 seasons New Crusaders competed in the FA Cup and the FA Amateur Cup, and in the latter season won the Middlesex Senior Cup - for which the club was newly eligible as its secretary's address was within the Middlesex county - with a 3–0 win over West Hampstead in the final at Ealing, thanks to goals from two Farnfields (H. V. and B. S.) and Yates.

The club ceased operations in 1915, with many players having joined to fight in the First World War, but the club never re-emerged; despite expectations that the club would re-start before the 1919–20 season, its final action was its resignation from the Isthmian League before the season started.

== Colours ==
The club's official colours were all white, with a cross pattée badge, although some photographs suggest black shorts and socks. The change kit was red shirts with white sleeves.

== Ground ==
The club played at Sidcup College, whose ground facilities were so meagre that Plymouth Argyle, when drawn to play there in the FA Cup first round in 1906, offered money to switch the tie to Home Park, and protested to the Football Association when the Crusaders turned the money down. In August 1908 the club moved to Sidcup Place (the former ground of Sidcup A.F.C.), whose "old country seat" the Farnfields had taken over for setting up a school.
