= Old Esthameians F.C. =

Association football club in England

Coordinates: 51°34′25.5″N 0°6′8.01″E

Old Esthameians
- Full name: Old Esthameians Football Club
- Founded: 1909
- Ground: Ford Sports & Social Club, Newbury Park
- Chairman: Chris Wood
- Manager: Jack Roland
- League: Essex Alliance League Premier Division West
Home colours	Away colours

Old Esthameians Football Club is a football club based in Newbury Park, England. They are currently members of the Essex Alliance League.

== History ==
Founded in 1909 by students from East Ham Grammar School, the club won the Ilford Intermediate Combination in 1922 and the East Ham Hospital Cup in 1923. Following World War II, Old Esthameians joined the Southern Olympian League, winning the London Old Boys' Cup in the 1947–48 season. In 1971, Old Esthameians joined the Southern Amateur League, winning Division Three in their first season in the system. In 1979, the club entered the FA Vase for the first time. In 1981, after working their way up through the divisions, Old Esthameians won the Southern Amateur League. Between 1982 and 1995, the club finished runners up of the division five times. In 2016, Old Esthameians moved to the Essex Alliance League.

== Ground ==
During the early days of the club, Old Esthameians played in Beckton and Rectory Fields in Manor Park. Upon joining the Southern Amateur League, the club played at Langdon School in East Ham. In 2002, the club moved to the Blake Hall Sports Centre in Wanstead. In 2007, Old Esthameians moved to the Peter May Sports Centre in Walthamstow. In 2010, the club moved to the Memorial Recreation Ground in West Ham, before moving to Ford Sports & Social Club in Newbury Park.

== Records ==
- Best FA Vase performance: First round, 1979–80, 1981–82, 1983–84, 1984–85
- Best league position: Champions, Southern Amateur Football League 1980–81, 2003–04
