= Finchley F.C. =

English football club based in Finchley, Greater London

Finchley
- Full name: Finchley Football Club
- Founded: 1877
- Dissolved: 1991
- Ground: Summers Lane, Finchley
- 1990–91: Isthmian League Division Two North, 21/22
Home colours

Finchley Football Club was an English football club based in Finchley, Greater London. Established in 1877, the club merged with Wingate to form Wingate & Finchley in 1991.

== History ==
The club was founded in 1877 by N. L. "Pa" Jackson under the name of Finchley Petrels Football Club. During the first season, the club had the misfortune to have an officer who ran off with the club's money and left the accounts in an incomprehensible state. It entered the FA Cup from 1878–79 to 1881–82, but only avoided defeat once - a 0–0 draw with Acton at the Alexandra Palace cricket ground in its last year of entry, followed by a 4–0 replay defeat.

In 1902 the club joined Division Two of the London League, and after finishing fourth in 1903–04, they were promoted to Division One. League reorganisation saw them placed in Division One B for the 1909–10 season, after which they left the league. They returned to Division One for the 1910–11 season, but left in 1912 to become founder members of the Athenian League.

In 1914 they rejoined the London League, playing in the Amateur Division, but did not return after World War I until 1923–24, when they were placed in the Premier Division. In 1929 the club rejoined the Athenian League, but returned to the London League after a single season. They were Premier Division champions in 1936–37, and returned to the Athenian League for the 1939–40 season, which was abandoned due to World War II.

After the war the club rejoined the Athenian League. They reached the first round of the FA Cup for the first time in 1946–47, losing 5–0 at Port Vale. In 1952–53 they reached the first round again, where they defeated Kidderminster Harriers 1–0. In the second round they beat Crystal Palace 3–1 at home, before losing 2–0 at Shrewsbury Town in the third round. The following season they were Athenian League champions, and reached the first round of the FA Cup again, losing 3–1 at home to Southend United.

When the league added more divisions in 1963 they were placed in the Premier Division, where they remained until being relegated to Division One at the end of the 1969–70 season. In 1973 they transferred to Division Two of the Isthmian League. In 1980–81 they finished bottom of a (renamed) Division One, and were relegated to Division Two. They were placed in Division Two North after restructuring in 1984, and after finishing second in 1984–85, were promoted to Division One. However, they were relegated back to Division Two North after finishing bottom of Division One in 1986–87.

Suffering from financial problems, the club merged with Wingate in 1991 to form Wingate & Finchley. The new club continued to play at Finchley's Summers Lane ground, which was renamed the Harry Abrahams Stadium after a long-term Wingate supporter.

== Colours ==
The club's original colours were scarlet and black; in hoops with a petrel badge in 1876-77, in halves with an FFC logo on a shield thereafter. By the 1940s the club was wearing white shirts and blue shorts.

== Honours ==
- Athenian League
  - Champions 1953–54
- London League
  - Premier Division champions 1936–37
- London Senior Cup
  - Winners 1932–33, 1951–52, 1952–53

== Former players ==
1. Players that have played/managed in the Football League or any foreign equivalent to this level (i.e. fully professional league).
2. Players with full international caps.
3. Players that hold a club record or have captained the club.

- (England) Warren Gravette
- (England) Billy Sperrin
- (England) George Robb

4. Jimmy Sontag. Brilliant Goalkeeper in the late 1950s 5. Johnny Dixon. A very lively Number 9. 6. Arthur Wastel Captain in 1950s early 60's
