= Arthurian League =

Association football league in England

The Arthurian League
- Founded: 1961; 65 years ago
- Country: England
- Confederation: Amateur Football Alliance
- Divisions: 6
- Number of clubs: 56
- Current champions: Old Reptonians (2024–25 Premier Division)
- Most championships: Old Carthusians (16 titles)
- Website: www.arthurianleague.co.uk

The Arthurian League is an English association football league for clubs comprising old boys of public schools founded in 1961. It is affiliated to the Amateur Football Alliance and is not part of the English football league system. It takes its name – via the Arthur Dunn Cup in which all founder members competed – from Old Etonian and England international Arthur Dunn.

== League competition ==
The Premier and First Divisions are restricted to first teams, while the remaining divisions are open to all teams.

== Cup competitions ==
Most first teams contest the Arthur Dunn Cup. Some enter cups run by – or affiliated to – the Amateur Football Alliance or other Greater London associations. In addition, the League runs two open aged knock-out cups and two veterans cups as follows:

- The Junior League Cup (for teams in Divisions 2, 3, 4 and 5)
- The David Woolcott Trophy (for teams in Divisions 4 and 5)
- The Derrick Moore Veterans Cup (for all veterans' teams)
- The Derrick Moore Veterans Plate (for teams losing in the 1st Round of the Derrick Moore Veterans Cup)

== Member clubs 2023–24 ==
Club	School	Teams
KCS Old Boys	King's College, Wimbledon	1st, 2nd, Vets
Lancing Old Boys	Lancing College	1st, Vets
Old Albanians	St Albans School	1st
Old Aldenhamians	Aldenham School	1st, Vets
Old Alleynians	Dulwich College	1st, 2nd, 3rd
Old Amplefordians	Ampleforth College	1st
Old Ardinians	Ardingly College	1st
Old Berkhamstedians	Berkhamsted School	1st, 2nd
Old Bradfieldians	Bradfield College	1st, Vets
Old Brentwoods	Brentwood School	1st, 2nd, 3rd, 4th, Vets
Old Canfordians	Canford School	1st
Old Carthusians	Charterhouse School	1st, 2nd, Vets
Old Cheltonians	Cheltenham College	1st
Old Chigwellians	Chigwell School	1st, 2nd, Vets
Old Cholmeleians	Highgate School	1st, 2nd, Vets
Old Cranleighans	Cranleigh School	1st
Old Epsomians	Epsom College	1st
Old Etonians	Eton College	1st, 2nd, Vets
Old Felstedians	Felsted School	1st
Old Foresters	Forest School, London	1st, Vets
Old Haberdashers	Haberdashers Boys School	1st
Old Harrovians	Harrow School	1st, 2nd, 3rd, Vets
Old Johnians	St John's School, Leatherhead	1st, 2nd
Old Kimboltonians	Kimbolton School	1st
Old King's Scholars	The King's School, Canterbury	1st
Old Kingstonians	Kingston Grammar School	1st
Old Malvernians	Malvern College	1st, Vets
Old Marlburians	Marlborough College	1st
Old Merchant Taylors	Merchant Taylors School, Northwood	1st
Old Oundelians	Oundle School	1st
Old Radleians	Radley College	1st
Old Reptonians	Repton School	1st, Vets
Old Rugbeians	Rugby School	1st
Old Salopians	Shrewsbury School	1st, 2nd, Vets
Old Sennockians	Sevenoaks School	1st
Old Shirburnians	Sherborne School	1st
Old Stoics	Stowe School	1st
Old Tonbridgians	Tonbridge School	1st, 2nd, Vets
Old Wellingtonians	Wellington College, Berkshire	1st, Vets
Old Westminsters	Westminster School	1st, 2nd, Vets
Old Wykehamists	Winchester College	1st, Vets

== Constitution for 2023–24 ==
=== Premier Division ===
- KCS Old Boys
- Old Alleynians
- Old Bradfieldians
- Old Carthusians
- Old Cholmeleians
- Old Etonians
- Old Foresters
- Old Johnians
- Old Reptonians
- Old Tonbridgians

=== Division One ===
- Old Ardinians
- Old Brentwoods
- Old Chigwellians
- Old Harrovians
- Old Kimboltonians
- Old Marlburians
- Old Radleians
- Old Rugbeians
- Old Salopians
- Old Wykehamists

=== Division Two ===
- Lancing Old Boys
- Old Aldenhamians
- Old Alleynians II
- Old Berkhamstedians
- Old Brentwoods II
- Old Cholmeleians II
- Old Etonians II
- Old Merchant Taylors
- Old Westminsters

=== Division Three ===
- Old Albanians
- Old Alleynians III
- Old Berkhamstedians II
- Old Brentwoods III
- Old Carthusians II
- Old Chigwellians II
- Old Epsomians
- Old Haberdashers
- Old Harrovians II
- Old Sennockians

=== Division Four ===
- KCS Old Boys II
- Old Amplefordians
- Old Brentwoods IV
- Old Harrovians III
- Old Johnians II
- Old King's Scholars
- Old Shirburnians
- Old Tonbridgians II
- Old Westminsters II

=== Division Five ===
- Old Canfordians
- Old Cheltonians
- Old Cranleighans
- Old Kingstonians
- Old Oundelians
- Old Salopians II
- Old Stoics
- Old Wellingtonians
- Old Wykehamists II

== Past champions ==
=== Premier Division ===
The league's top division was known as the Senior Division until 1975, and Division One until 1981.

Season	Champion
1962–63	(Competition abandoned)
1963–64	Old Malvernians
1964–65	Old Malvernians
1965–66	Lancing Old Boys
1966–67	Old Brentwoods
1967–68	Old Malvernians
1968–69	Old Malvernians
1969–70	Old Malvernians
1970–71	Old Cholmeleians
1971–72	Old Bradfieldians
1972–73	Old Foresters
1973–74	Old Foresters
1974–75	Old Brentwoods
1975–76	Old Brentwoods
1976–77	Old Aldenhamians
1977–78	Old Harrovians
1978–79	Old Carthusians
1979–80	Old Brentwoods
1980–81	Old Brentwoods
1981–82	Old Carthusians
1982–83	Lancing Old Boys
1983–84	Lancing Old Boys
1984–85	Lancing Old Boys
1985–86	Old Chigwellians
1986–87	Old Cholmeleians
1987–88	Old Carthusians
1988–89	Old Cholmeleians
1989–90	Old Chigwellians
1990–91	Lancing Old Boys
1991–92	Old Chigwellians
1992–93	Old Etonians
1993–94	Lancing Old Boys
1994–95	Old Chigwellians
1995–96	Old Foresters
1996–97	Old Foresters
1997–98	Old Foresters
1998–99	Old Chigwellians
1999-00	Old Brentwoods
2000–01	(Competition abandoned)
2001–02	Old Reptonians
2002–03	Old Foresters
2003–04	Old Harrovians
2004–05	Old Etonians
2005–06	Old Carthusians
2006–07	Old Brentwoods
2007–08	Old Carthusians
2008–09	Old Carthusians
2009–10	Old Harrovians
2010–11	Old Carthusians
2011–12	Old Carthusians
2012–13	Old Carthusians
2013–14	Old Carthusians
2014–15	Old Carthusians
2015–16	Old Tonbridgians
2016–17	Old Carthusians
2017–18	Old Foresters
2018–19	Old Carthusians
2019–20	(Competition abandoned)
2020–21	(Competition abandoned)
2021–22	Old Carthusians
2022–23	Old Carthusians
2023–24	Old Reptonians
2024-25	Old Reptonians

== See also ==
Category:Arthurian League clubs
