= Green Pond Road =

Former football stadium in Walthamstow, London

Coordinates: 51°35′29″N 0°01′50″W

Green Pond Road was a football stadium in Walthamstow, London and the home ground of Walthamstow Avenue until they merged with Leytonstone & Ilford to form Redbridge Forest, a precursor to Dagenham & Redbridge. The ground was often simply called The Green Pond or The Pond.

== History ==
The stadium was used for one game during the football tournament of the 1948 Summer Olympics.

The last game played at Green Pond Road was the last game of the 1988–89 season (on Saturday 6 May 1989), when Leytonstone/Ilford defeated Farnborough Town 5–3. Leytonstone had finished the season as Champions of the Isthmian League Premier Division, with Farnborough in second place.

=== Olympic matches ===
Date	Time	Team #1	Result	Team #2	Round	Attendance
2 August 1948	18:30	Turkey	4–0	Taiwan	First round	3,000
