= London Caledonians F.C. =

London Caledonians
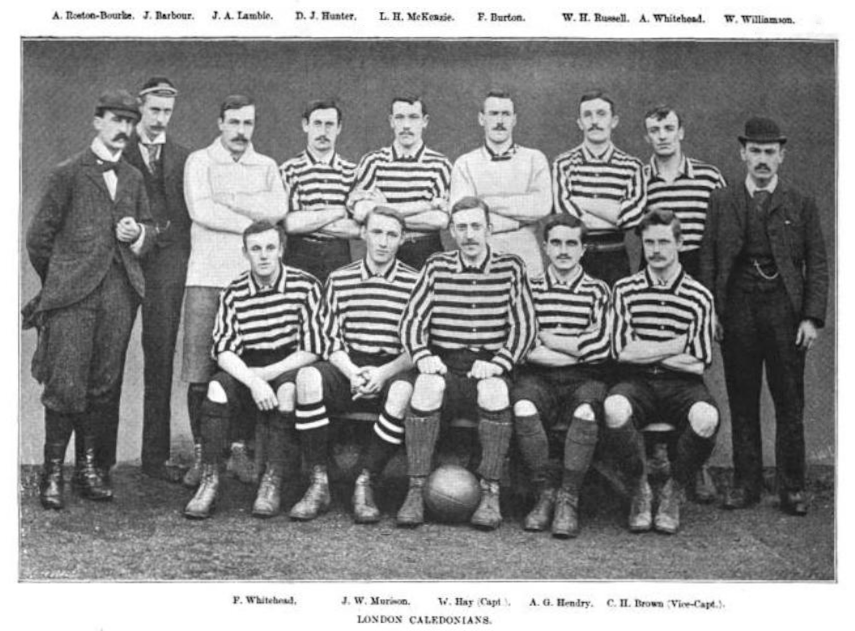
- 1894
- Full name: London Caledonians Football Club
- Nickname(s): the Caleys
- Founded: 1886
- Dissolved: 1939
- Ground: Caledonian Park, Holloway
- 1938–39: Isthmian League, 14th (folded)
Home colours

London Caledonians F.C. was an amateur football club based in London, primarily for Scottish players. They were founder members of the Isthmian League, which they won in its inaugural season. They remained in the league until 1939 when the club folded.

== History ==
In 1885, Hugh Macpherson, a player with Champion Hill F.C., a London club with a number of Scots members, founded the club, because of the "scant success" of United London Scottish, the first London club aimed solely at exiled Scots. Macpherson brought together more Scots players for the new club, including some of the U.L.S. players such as Bill Stirling (a forward converted into a goalkeeper) and captain W.E. Fry, with the result that U.L.S. was both no longer needed and no longer competitive. In the 1886-87 London Senior Cup, U.L.S. went down 7–1 at St Martin's Athletic of Priory Farm in the first round, whereas London Caledonians reached the quarter-finals. By 1888, U.L.S. was defunct and London Caledonians became the only "exile" club in the capital.

The club won the first of their five Middlesex Senior Cups in 1889–90 and the first of their five London Senior Cups in 1899–1900. They were founder members of the Isthmian League in 1905 and were champions in its first season. They won the league again in 1907–08 and then three times in a row between 1911–12 and 1913–14.

The club's best run in the FA Cup came in 1886–87, reaching the third round, where they were drawn with the Old Carthusians. The game was scheduled for the Princess Victoria ground in Shepherd's Bush, but, as a heavy frost had fallen, the club sent a telegram to P.M. Walters of the Carthusians, saying that it would not turn up. The Carthusians nevertheless did attend, and the tie was awarded to them.

After qualifying rounds were brought in two years later, the club reached the first round of the FA Cup in 1912–13, but lost 3–1 at Wolverhampton Wanderers. The following season they started in the first round, but lost 3–0 at Huddersfield Town.

In 1922–23 the club reached the final of the FA Amateur Cup, in which they defeated Evesham Town 2–1. The following season they reached the semi-finals again, but lost in a second replay. A sixth Isthmian League title was won in 1924–25. The following season they again entered the FA Cup in the first round, but lost to Ilford. In 1926–27 they again lost in the first round, this time to Luton Town. However, the following season they reached the third round, where they lost 3–2 at home to Crewe Alexandra. The club did not return to the league after World War II.

== Colours ==
The club wore black and white jerseys with dark blue knickers.

== Ground ==
The club's Caledonian Park ground was on Monnery Road in Holloway.

== Honours ==
- FA Amateur Cup
  - Winners 1922–23
- Isthmian League
  - Champions 1905–06, 1907–08, 1911–12, 1912–13, 1913–14, 1924–25
- London Senior Cup
  - Winners 1899–1900, 1907–08, 1914–15, 1922–26, 1927–28
- Middlesex Senior Cup
  - Winners 1889–90, 1890–91, 1898–99, 1899–1900, 1934–35
- London Charity Cup
  - Winners 1895–96, 1907–08, 1908–09, 1912–13
- East London Senior Cup
  - Winners 1886–87

== See also ==
- London Caledonians F.C. players
