= Amateur Football Alliance =

County football association in England

- Founded: May 1906 (as Amateur Football Defence Council); 7 July 1907 (as Amateur Football Association)
- Headquarters: Unit 3, 7 Wenlock Road, London, N1 7SL
- CEO: Jason Kilby
- Website: www.amateur-fa.com

The Amateur FA (Football Alliance) is a county football association in England. It is unusual among county FAs in not serving a particular geographical area. It was founded in 1906 as the Amateur Football Defence Council, was briefly known as the Amateur Football Defence Federation, and was reformed as the Amateur Football Association in 1907, when The FA required all county associations to admit professional clubs. Its aim was, as the decline of amateurism at the highest levels of football set in, to protect and preserve the original amateur spirit. It prides itself on the skill and competitiveness of its leagues, and on its traditions of fair play and respect for opponents and match officials. Many leagues still maintain rules that require clubs to provide food and drink to their opponents and match officials after the match in a clubhouse or public house.

== History ==
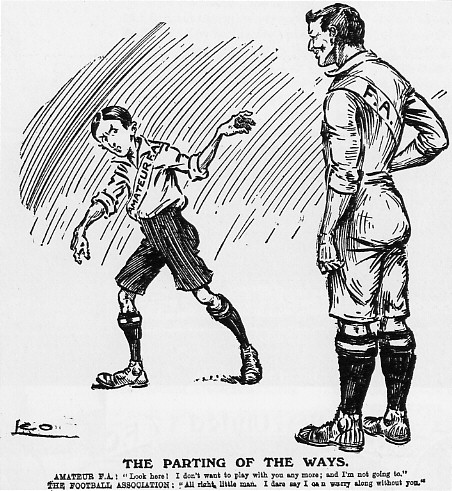
One view of the split.

With tension between amateur clubs and the Football Association mounting due to the rise of professionalism, the organisation was formed in May 1906 as the Amateur Football Defence Council, following unanimous agreement at a meeting of around 100 clubs from the London metropolitan area. In September 1906, the AFDC warned the London FA that its clubs would be boycotting the London Senior Cup the following season. Later that month, the organisation was renamed the Amateur Football Defence Federation.

=== Split from football association ===
Following the general meeting of The Football Association on 31 May 1907, it was decided by the Federation that in the best interest of amateur football that a new and separate organisation must be created. The inaugural meeting of the Amateur Football Association was held in the Crown Room of the Holborn Restaurant on 7 July 1907. They were addressed by Alfred Lyttelton MP, before B.A. Glanville of Clapham Rovers proposed the formation of the Association, which was seconded by N.C. Bailey. It was stated that the foundation of the Association wasn't in opposition to professionalism in sport but instead to the "fungus growth which had become attached to the machinery of football management". Lord Alverstone was elected as the first president of the new society, and the Corinthians offered to provide a trophy for a new cup competition. The existing Federation committee was elected to the new organisation.

=== Football association ban on amateur players and clubs ===
The Football Association responded by banning amateur players from playing for professional clubs, and resulted in the end of the Sheriff of London Charity Shield after the FA refused to provide a professional team for the match, and barred all its members from either playing or providing facilities. However a later resolution by the FA meant that any player who had played for his school, college or university team which was a member of the Amateur Football Association was not banned from playing for a professional team. Furthermore, the FA asked the Scottish, Welsh and Irish Football Association not to recognise the formation of the AFA.

A number of teams were forced to choose between one association or the other. Cambridge University pledged their allegiance to the Amateur Football Association and in response, so did Oxford University although they would have preferred to remain neutral between the two. Both the Leicestershire and Essex Football Association were early supporters of the actions of the Football Association against the AFA. Meanwhile, both the Army and Royal Navy Football Associations took the question of which Association to support by holding a vote of its member clubs; this resulting in both remaining with the Football Association.

The AFA tried to join FIFA, but it was not admitted, so it founded UIAFA along with French USFSA and Bohemian ČSF in March 1909.

=== Ban repealed ===
The schism lasted until 1914, when the FA agreed to allow the AFA to retain its amateur policy. The AFA, Oxford, Cambridge, and the public schools would each nominate one member of the FA Council, with the AFA also represented on the national team selection committee and Amateur Cup committee. A maximum of twelve clubs per year (four from one county) could join the AFA.

Two current AFA clubs are former FA Cup winners: Old Etonians and Old Carthusians, who both currently play in the Arthurian League. Past members of the AFA include Ipswich Town, Barnet, Cambridge City, the Casuals and the Corinthians. Sir Stanley Rous, who was president of FIFA, was also the president of the AFA. The AFA's flagship competition is the AFA Senior Cup which is contested by AFA-affiliated clubs on Saturday afternoons. Most of these clubs enter one of the two AFA-affiliated Saturday leagues, the Southern Amateur League, Amateur Football Combination (now merged with the Southern Amateur League in July 2025) and the Arthurian League, the SAL having been founded in the same year as the AFA (1907) by more or less the same group of people.

The Amateur FA's heartland is in London and the Home Counties.

The organisation changed its name to the Amateur Football Alliance in April 1934.
