= West Hampstead F.C. =

Former football team

West Hampstead
- Full name: West Hampstead F.C.
- Nickname(s): the Wests
- Founded: 1893
- Dissolved: 1911
- Ground: Cricklewood Lane/Lower Welsh Harp
Home colours

West Hampstead was a football team that formerly played in the Southern Football League.

== History ==
The first reference to the club was in 1893, and in 1897 they joined Division Two of the London League.

They were elected to Division Two of the Southern League for the 1901/02 season, winning six of their 16 league matches. They left the league at the end of the season.

In 1905/06 they reached the 4th Qualifying Round of the FA Cup, losing to Swindon Town.

There were suggestions that the club had "broken up" before the 1910–11 season, but the club did survive long enough to play in the qualifying rounds of the 1910–11 FA Cup, but the club resigned from the London League before September was out, and the club did not re-emerge for the 1911–12 season.

== Colours ==
The club wore light blue shirts, with black shorts and stockings.

== Ground ==
The club's initial ground was near Hampstead Cemetery. In 1897 it moved to a ground between Willesden Green station and Exeter Road, and in 1901 to a new enclosure at Child's Hill, Cricklewood Lane. In 1907 the club moved to its final ground, at the Lower Welsh Harp in West Hendon.

== Notable players ==
- Samuel Downing, later of Chelsea F.C.
