= Amateur Football Combination =

Association football league in England

AFC Combination
- Current season, competition or edition: 2022-23
- Sport: Football
- Founded: 2002
- No. of teams: 200(19 divisions) (5 senior divisions)
- Country: England
- Most recent champion: (Premier) Dorkinians 2022-23

The Amateur Football Combination (AFC) is a football league based in and around London and the Home Counties, and is believed to be the biggest adult football league in Europe.

== History ==
The Amateur Football Combination is one of the biggest adult football leagues in Europe, with around 75 clubs and 200 teams playing Saturday afternoons in and around London and the Home Counties from September through to May, and comprises more than 1% of adult male 11-a-side football teams in England.

The AFC is an adult male league affiliated to the Amateur Football Alliance (AFA), with clubs that also compete from London FA, Middlesex FA and Surrey FA, and was formed in 2002 by the merger of the Old Boys' Football League (1907) and Southern Olympian League (1911) and subsequently merging with the London Financial Football Association (itself comprising the London Banks Football Association, 1900 and the London Insurance Football Association, 1908) in 2006.

== AFC Membership ==
Clubs and club members include "Old Boys" sides, local authorities and businesses, as well as socials.

== League Structure ==
The league is divided into four sections using a pyramid system, but plays outside of the "football pyramid" - the top teams do not progress into semi-professional leagues:

AFC League System
Premier
Senior 1 North	Senior 1 South
Senior 2 North	Senior 2 South
Inter. North	Inter. South
1 North	1 South
2 North	2 South
3 North	3 South
4 North	4 South
5 North	5 South
5 North	5 South
6 North	6 South

== Cup Competitions ==
As well as league competitions, AFC clubs take part in cup competitions. Most clubs enter the Amateur Football Alliance County Cups, but depending on their location clubs also enter Surrey FA, London FA and Middlesex FA Cups. Almost all clubs also enter the London Old Boys Cups. In the event of a dry winter, if the league programme finishes early in the spring, the AFC will run its own "Spring Cups".

== Recent divisional champions, Senior Section ==
Season	Premier Division	Senior Division 1	Senior Division 2
2002-03	Old Meadonians	Old Salvatorians	Old Tenisonians
2003-04	Old Meadonians	Parkfield	Glyn Old Boys
2004-05	Old Meadonians	Bealonians	Wood Green Old Boys
2005-06	Old Meadonians	Southgate County	Sinjuns Grammarians
2006-07	Old Meadonians	Enfield Old Grammarians	Old Meadonians Reserves
2007-08	Old Aloysians	Parkfield	Old Minchendenians
2008-09	Bealonians	Old Minchendenians	Centymca
2009-10	Albanian	Old Suttonians	Old Uffingtonians
2010-11	Old Meadonians	UCL Academicals	Enfield Old Grammarians
2011-12	Old Minchendenians	Old Suttonians	Honourable Artillery Company Reserves
2012-13	Old Minchendenians	Enfield Old Grammarians	Shene Old Grammarians
2013-14	Old Hamptonians	Old Ignatian	Old Pauline
2014-15	Old Hamptonians	Old Thorntonians	
2015-16	Old Hamptonians	Old Wokingians	
2016-17	Old Meadonians	Park View	
2017-18	Old Hamptonians	Southgate Olympic	
2018-19	Old Hamptonians	Fulham Compton Old Boys	
2019-20	N/A	N/A	
2020-21	Old Hamptonians		
2021-22	Old Hamptonians	Old Ignatian/Economicals	

== Spirit of Football ==
In 2006 the AFC launched its "Spirit of Football" campaign, emphasising and promoting fair play and respect for all within the game, a concept later embraced nationally within the Football Association's "Respect" campaign.
