= Essex County League =

- Founded: 1937
- First season: 1937–38
- Folded: 1938
- Country: England
- Divisions: One
- Number of clubs: Six
- Last champions: Harwich & Parkston (1937–38)
- Most championships: Harwich & Parkston (1)

The Essex County League was a short-lived football league in England in the 1930s. The league was established in 1937 and seen as a threat to the viability of the Eastern Counties League, which had only been formed two years earlier. However, it failed to attract enough clubs to join and lasted only a single season before folding.

== History ==
The league was formed following a meeting at the Liverpool Street Hotel in London in March 1937. The five Essex clubs who were members of the recently established Eastern Counties League (including Chelmsford, whose president was also the president of the ECL) agreed to join and find other clubs from the county which were interested in joining, One reason behind the move was the time and cost of travelling to coastal towns in Norfolk and Suffolk, who comprised most of the members of the ECL at the time. Despite hoping to attract teams from mid-Essex and the north-east edge of London, Dagenham Town of the London League were the only other club to join, and as the season was about to start in September, the president of Crittall Athletic admitted that the clubs had made a mistake by leaving the ECL.

The league began with six clubs, but Colchester Town went bust in December, resulting in their record being expunged (at the time they had played six matches, drawing one and losing five). The league continued with the clubs playing each other four times each. At the end of the season Harwich & Parkeston (the champions), Clacton Town and Crittall Athletic returned to the ECL and Dagenham Town to the London League, whilst Chelmsford were transformed into Chelmsford City, who joined the Southern League.

== League table ==
Pos	Team	Pld	W	D	L	GF	GA	GD	Pts
1	Harwich & Parkeston	16	12	1	3	51	18	+33	25
2	Critall Athletic	16	9	3	4	38	20	+18	21
3	Chelmsford	16	6	2	8	37	38	−1	14
4	Dagenham Town	16	3	4	9	28	53	−25	10
5	Clacton Town	16	4	2	10	15	40	−25	10

Source: Football Club History Database
