= Mark Bellingham =

English footballer (born 1976)

Personal information
- Date of birth: 7 March 1976 (age 50)
- Place of birth: Southend-on-Sea, Essex, England
- Position: Forward

Youth career
- Catholic United

Senior career*
Years	Team	Apps	(Gls)
- Catholic United
1994–1995	East Thurrock United		
1995–1996	Chelmsford City	47	(16)
1996	→ Halesowen Town (loan)		
1996–1997	Cheltenham Town		
1997	→ Newport County (loan)		
1997–1998	Halesowen Town		
1998–2000	West Midlands Police		
2000–2003	Sutton Coldfield Town		
2003–2005	Bromsgrove Rovers	15	(9)
2005–2008	Stourbridge		
2008–2009	Leamington	87	(79)
2009	Hednesford Town	6	(0)
2009–2010	Causeway United		
2010–2011	Sutton Coldfield Town		
2011	Daventry Town		
2011–2012	Bedworth United		
2012	Sutton Coldfield Town		
2012–2014	Wolverhampton Casuals		
2014	Hinckley		
2014	Bromsgrove Sporting	36	(45)
2014–2015	Cradley Town		
2015–2017	Paget Rangers		
2017–2019	Southam United		
- * Club domestic league appearances and goals

Mark Bellingham (born 7 March 1976) is an English former footballer who played as a forward in the Northern Premier League and Southern League.

== Early life ==
Bellingham is a native of Southend-on-Sea, Essex, England. Bellingham joined Southend-based side Catholic United in the mid-1980s as a youth player, eventually starting his senior career at the club.

Bellingham attended the University of Wolverhampton.

== Career ==
Bellingham was regarded as a prolific non-league striker, scoring over 700 goals. In 2001, he almost retired from football after suffering his second torn cruciate ligament. By the late 2010s, he retired from non-league football and started playing in veterans' tournaments. He last played as a striker for Southam United.

== Personal life ==
He is the father of footballers Jude and Jobe Bellingham. Mark is a supporter of Southend United.
