= Hermes F.C. (England) =

Hermes
- Full name: Hermes Football Club
- Founded: 1932
- Ground: Plough Lane, Beddington

Hermes Football Club was a football club based in Beddington, England.

== History ==
Founded in 1932 as a works team for the London Telephone Region, the club entered the London League under the name Post Office Engineers from 1932 to 1950. Under the Post Office Engineers name, the club entered the FA Cup in 1946 and competed in the Surrey Senior League and the Parthenon League between 1955 and 1959 and 1960 to 1962 respectively. After also competing under the name Post Office Telecoms, the club changed their name to Hermes, playing in the London League and becoming founder members of the Greater London League.

== Ground ==
The club played at Plough Lane in Beddington.

== Records ==
- Best FA Cup performance: Preliminary round, 1947–48
