= Cameron Carter-Vickers =

Professional soccer player (born 1997)

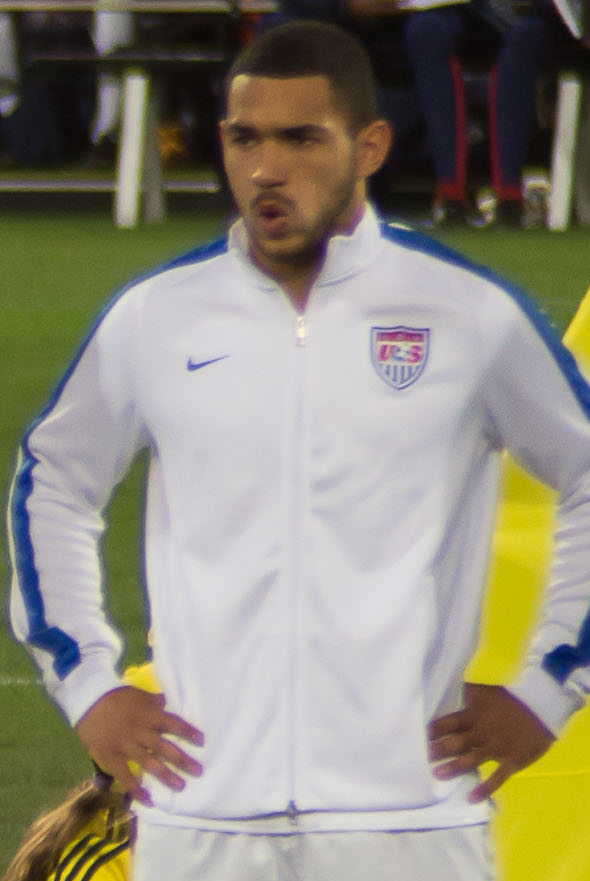
- Carter-Vickers with the United States under-20 in 2015

Personal information
- Full name: Cameron Robert Carter-Vickers
- Date of birth: December 31, 1997 (age 28)
- Place of birth: Southend-on-Sea, England
- Height: 6 ft 1 in (1.85 m)
- Position: Center-back

Team information
- Current team: Celtic
- Number: 20

Youth career
- –2009: Catholic United
- 2009–2016: Tottenham Hotspur

Senior career*
Years	Team	Apps	(Gls)
2016–2022	Tottenham Hotspur	0	(0)
2017–2018	→ Sheffield United (loan)	17	(1)
2018	→ Ipswich Town (loan)	17	(0)
2018–2019	→ Swansea City (loan)	30	(0)
2019–2020	→ Stoke City (loan)	12	(0)
2020	→ Luton Town (loan)	16	(0)
2020–2021	→ AFC Bournemouth (loan)	21	(1)
2021–2022	→ Celtic (loan)	33	(4)
2022–	Celtic	91	(2)

International career^{‡}
2014	United States U18	3	(0)
2014–2017	United States U20	17	(1)
2014–2019	United States U23	11	(1)
2017–	United States	19	(0)
- * Club domestic league appearances and goals as of October 19, 2025 ‡ National team caps and goals as of March 23, 2025

Cameron Robert Carter-Vickers (born December 31, 1997) is a professional soccer player who plays as a center-back for Scottish Premiership club Celtic. Born in England, he represents the United States national team.

Carter-Vickers began his career at the Tottenham Hotspur Academy. He made his debut in the 2016–17 season, playing in cup competitions. From 2017 to 2021 he spent time out on loan at Championship clubs Sheffield United, Ipswich Town, Swansea City, Stoke City, Luton Town, and Bournemouth.

In 2021, he went on loan to Celtic in the Scottish Premiership, before signing permanently in 2022. He has won the Scottish Premiership four times, the Scottish League Cup three times, and the Scottish Cup twice. He was included three times on the PFA Scotland Team of the Year.

Carter-Vickers has gained 19 caps for the United States and represented his country at the 2022 FIFA World Cup and the 2024 Copa America.

== Club career ==
=== Tottenham Hotspur ===
Carter-Vickers joined the academy at Tottenham Hotspur at around 2009 at the age of 11, having caught the eyes of scouts as a 10-year-old playing in the youth teams at Catholic United.

He was fast tracked through the academy, and under then-Tottenham manager Mauricio Pochettino he made his first match-day squad against Ligue 1 team AS Monaco in the UEFA Europa League on December 10, 2015. Carter-Vickers featured in the 2016 International Champions Cup, making starts against Juventus and Atlético Madrid, and was given the shirt number 38 for the 2016–17 season. On September 21, 2016, he made his first-team debut for the club in the third round of the EFL Cup against Gillingham, which Spurs won 5–0. He also featured in the next round away at Liverpool, which Spurs lost 2–1. He played two FA Cup matches in January 2017, firstly against Aston Villa then Wycombe Wanderers.

==== Loans ====
On August 25, 2017, Carter-Vickers joined newly promoted Championship side Sheffield United on a season-long. loan deal. On his debut and his first career league game, Carter-Vickers scored the only goal of the game, a 33rd-minute winner against Bolton Wanderers. After playing 18 games for Sheffield United and scoring one goal, Carter-Vickers was recalled and returned to Tottenham on January 15, 2018.

On January 19, 2018, fellow English side Ipswich Town signed Carter-Vickers on loan until the end of the season. He made his Ipswich Town debut away to Bolton Wanderers on January 20, 2018. Carter-Vickers played 17 times for the Tractor Boys as they finished in a mid-table position of 12th.

Swansea City signed Carter-Vickers on loan until the end of the season on August 25, 2018. At Swansea, he formed a partnership alongside Mike van der Hoorn at center-back after the injury to first choice Joe Rodon. In total, he made 33 appearances in all competitions for Swansea, impressing partially due to his passing ability from the center-back position.

On August 8, 2019, Carter-Vickers joined Stoke City on loan for the 2019–20 season. He made 15 appearances before he was recalled by Spurs on January 2, 2020, and then sent on a six-month loan to Luton Town four weeks later. Due to the season being extended by the COVID-19 outbreak, Carter-Vickers' loan to Luton was extended till the end of the campaign.

Carter-Vickers joined Championship side AFC Bournemouth on a season-long loan on October 16, 2020. He scored his first goal for Bournemouth in a 2–1 win at Bristol City on March 3, 2021.

==== Return to Tottenham ====
On August 19, 2021, Carter-Vickers received his first Tottenham appearance since 2017, starting under new manager Nuno Espírito Santo in the club's first-ever UEFA Europa Conference League match, a 1–0 loss away at Paços de Ferreira.

=== Celtic ===
On August 31, 2021, Carter-Vickers joined Celtic on loan until the end of the 2021–22 season. He scored on his debut with a deflected strike from outside the box in a 3–0 victory over Ross County on September 13.

He played 45 games in all competitions as the team won the Scottish League Cup and the Premiership, with Celtic holding the best defensive record in the latter.

On June 10, 2022, Carter-Vickers signed with Celtic permanently, subsequently leaving Tottenham. The deal was effective from July 1. The transfer was on a four-year deal for an undisclosed fee, reported to be around £6 million.

On January 26, 2024, Carter-Vickers signed a five-and-a-half-year contract with Celtic, keeping him with the club until 2029.

== International career ==
=== Youth ===
In the summer of 2014, Carter-Vickers was playing for Tottenham's academy side at the IMG Cup in Bradenton, Florida, where they beat the United States under-17 team 5–3. During the game, he caught the eye of American coaches who had learned of his eligibility for a United States passport, as his father is an American citizen.

Carter-Vickers represented the United States for the first time at under-18 level in August 2014 and by October of that year was a member of the United States under-23 team. He represented the United States at the 2015 FIFA U-20 World Cup and started several games despite being only 17 at the time. The team were knocked out by Serbia in the quarter-finals.

In September 2016, it was reported that the English FA had made inquiries about Carter-Vickers and that the United States were prepared to fast track the player into their senior set up. On October 10, 2016, Carter-Vickers captained the United States under-20 team in a 2–0 loss against England.

=== Senior ===
On November 6, 2016, Carter-Vickers received his first call up to the senior United States squad. He made his senior debut appearance on November 14, 2017, in a friendly as a half-time substitute in a 1–1 draw away to Portugal.

In May 2022, coach Gregg Berhalter recalled Carter-Vickers after nearly three years without a cap. He was called up for the 2022 FIFA World Cup in November and made his World Cup debut on November 29 against Iran.

== Style of play ==
Carter-Vickers is known as a ball-playing center-back with accurate passing ability. He is primarily known for his athleticism and strength, and are often utilized as some of his best qualities when defending. His former Celtic teammate Carl Starfelt spoke about Carter-Vickers, stating, "Cameron is the strongest in the team — but he is never in the gym... I think he's just super-strong genetically as he is never in the gym."

== Personal life ==
Carter-Vickers' father is Howard Carter, a retired American basketball player who spent his professional career in the NBA and Europe and became a French citizen. His English mother, Geraldine Vickers, is from Essex. Carter and Vickers met while both were working in Greece. He was raised in Essex and attended The Eastwood Academy in Leigh-on-Sea, while spending summers with his father in Louisiana.

== Career statistics ==
=== Club ===
As of match played August 20, 2025

Appearances and goals by club, season and competition
Club	Season	League			National cup (Note: Includes FA Cup and Scottish Cup)		League cup (Note: Includes EFL Cup and Scottish League Cup)		Other		Total	
Club	Season	Division	Apps	Goals	Apps	Goals	Apps	Goals	Apps	Goals	Apps	Goals
Tottenham Hotspur	2016–17	Premier League	0	0	2	0	2	0	—		4	0
Tottenham Hotspur	2021–22	Premier League	0	0	—		—		1 (Note: Appearance in UEFA Europa Conference League)	0	1	0
Tottenham Hotspur	Total		0	0	2	0	2	0	1	0	5	0
Sheffield United (loan)	2017–18	Championship	17	1	1	0	—		—		18	1
Ipswich Town (loan)	2017–18	Championship	17	0	—		—		—		17	0
Swansea City (loan)	2018–19	Championship	30	0	3	0	—		—		33	0
Stoke City (loan)	2019–20	Championship	12	0	—		3	0	—		15	0
Luton Town (loan)	2019–20	Championship	16	0	—		—		—		16	0
AFC Bournemouth (loan)	2020–21	Championship	21	1	3	0	—		2 (Note: Appearances in Championship play-offs)	0	26	1
Celtic (loan)	2021–22	Scottish Premiership	33	4	3	0	3	0	6 (Note: Five appearances in UEFA Europa League, one appearance in UEFA Europa Conference League)	0	45	4
Celtic	2022–23	Scottish Premiership	29	0	3	1	3	0	4 (Note: Appearances in UEFA Champions League)	0	39	1
Celtic	2023–24	Scottish Premiership	25	1	2	0	0	0	4	0	31	1
Celtic	2024–25	Scottish Premiership	30	1	4	0	3	1	7	0	44	2
Celtic	2025–26	Scottish Premiership	2	0	0	0	0	0	1	0	3	0
Celtic	Total		86	2	9	1	6	1	16	0	117	4
Career total			232	8	21	1	14	1	24	0	286	10

=== International ===
As of match played March 23, 2025

Appearances and goals by national team and year
National team	Year	Apps	Goals
United States	2017	1	0
United States	2018	6	0
United States	2019	1	0
United States	2022	4	0
United States	2023	4	0
United States	2024	2	0
United States	2025	1	0
Total		19	0

== Honors ==
Celtic

- Scottish Premiership (5): 2021–22, 2022–23, 2023–24, 2024–25, 2025-26
- Scottish League Cup (3): 2021–22, 2022–23, 2024–25
- Scottish Cup (2): 2022–23, 2023–24

United States U20

- CONCACAF U-20 Championship third place: 2015

Individual

- PFA Scotland Team of the Year: 2021–22 Premiership, 2022–23 Premiership, 2023–24 Premiership
