= Edmonton F.C. =

Edmonton F.C. may refer to:

- Edmonton Aviators, a soccer club in Canada known as Edmonton F.C. for part of its existence in 2004
- Edmonton F.C. (England), a football club in England in existence between 1950 and 1973
- FC Edmonton, a soccer club in Canada in existence between 2010 and 2022
