= Canning Town F.C. =

Association football club in England

Coordinates: 51°35′51.85″N 0°35′6.41″E

Canning Town
- Full name: Canning Town Football Club
- Founded: 1948; 78 years ago
- Ground: Rayleigh Town Sports & Social Club, Rayleigh
- Chairman: Paul Mooney
- Manager: Lee Wilson
- League: Essex Olympian League Division One
- 2024–25: Essex Olympian League Division One, 5th of 12
Home colours	Away colours

Canning Town Football Club is a football club based in Canning Town, in the London Borough of Newham, England. They are currently members of the Essex Olympian League Division One.

== History ==
The club was formed in 1948 by Eric Keylock who had decided to start his own football team after persuading his other founding company, Traffic Services, to provide sets of the club uniform. Keylock decided to pursue this endeavour after being discharged from the Royal Air Force.

During the 1980s, Canning Town competed in the South Essex League. The club joined the Essex Intermediate League (later to become the Essex Olympian League) in 2000, winning Division Two in their first season in the league. The club first competed in the Premier Division for the first time in the 2007–08 season, remaining in the Premier Division for five seasons. Canning Town entered the FA Vase for the first time in 2009, losing 7–0 to Erith Town in the first qualifying round. In the 2015–16 season, the first team won Division One of the Essex Olympian Football League and were promoted back into the Premier Division. In the 2016–17 season, they reached the first round proper of the FA Vase for the first time in their history, losing 5–4 at home against Biggleswade.

== Ground ==
During the early 2000s, Canning Town played at Southern Road Playing Fields in Plaistow, later moving to Gooseley Playing Fields in East Ham by the mid-2000s. The club later moved to the Terence McMillan Stadium in Plaistow, before moving to the West Ham United Foundation ground in Beckton. On 22 May 2024, Canning Town announced their intention to move out of Greater London and groundshare with Rayleigh Town at their Rayleigh Town Sports & Social Club ground.

In September 2011, Canning Town used Aveley's Mill Field ground for a 1–1 FA Vase draw against Eton Manor.

== Records ==
- Best league position: 7th in the Essex Olympian League, 2007–08
- Best FA Vase performance: First round, 2016–17
