= Tufnell Park F.C. =

Tufnell Park
- Full name: Tufnell Park Football Club
- Founded: 1907
- Dissolved: 1950
- Ground: Campdale Road, Holloway; Claremont Road, Cricklewood; Allbury Ride, Cheshunt; Barrass Stadium, Edmonton
Home colours

Tufnell Park Football Club was a football club based in London, England. One of the top amateur clubs in the country in the early 20th century, they merged with Edmonton Borough in 1950 to form Tufnell Park Edmonton.

== History ==
The club was established in 1907 and joined Division One of the London League. They finished third in their first season in the division and were promoted to the Premier Division. However, the following season saw the club finish bottom of the Premier Division, resulting in relegation to Division One B. They were Division One B runners-up in 1909–10, also reaching the semi-finals of the FA Amateur Cup (where they lost 4–0 to eventual winners RMLI Gosport, and were placed in Section B of the Premier Division when the league was reorganised the following season. In 1911 the club's reserve team broke away to form Tufnell Spartans.

Tufnell Park reached the Amateur Cup semi-finals again in 1911–12, this time losing 1–0 to Eston United. The club were demoted to Division Two of the London League in 1912, at which point they also entered a team into the Athenian League. They won the London Senior Cup in 1912–13, and at the end of the season the club were moved to Division One as Division Two was abolished. The 1913–14 season saw them win the Athenian League title, as well as a third appearance in the Amateur Cup semi-finals, which ended with a 2–0 defeat to Northern Nomads.

When football resumed after World War I, Tufnell Park played in the United Senior League in 1918–19, before joining the Isthmian League for the 1919–20 season. They reached the final of the Amateur Cup in 1919–20, losing 1–0 to Dulwich Hamlet at the Old Den. In 1921–22 they reached the sixth qualifying round of the FA Cup, losing 2–1 to Third Division North club Grimsby Town in a replay. In 1923–24 the club won the London Senior Cup again, but the team was on the wane and finished bottom of the Isthmian League in 1929–30.

During World War II Tufnell Park won the Middlesex Senior Cup in 1943–44. After the war the club finished bottom of the league again in 1948–49 and 1949–50. In 1950 they merged with Edmonton Borough to form Tufnell Park Edmonton. The new club later merged with Wood Green Town (a renamed Tufnell Spartans) to form Edmonton & Haringey. This club was renamed Haringey Borough in 1976 and was briefly renamed Tufnell Park in 1995 before reverting to Haringey Borough the following year.

== Colours ==
The club wore green and white, originally in hoops, but after the Second World War in quarters.

== Ground ==
Following World War I, the club played at Campdale Road (now Tufnell Park playing fields), groundsharing with London Caledonians. In 1938 they moved to Claremont Road, home ground of Golders Green. After World War II the club played at Cheshunt's Albury Ride ground for a short time before moving to the Barrass Stadium in Edmonton. When the club merged with Edmonton Borough, they continued playing at the Barrass Stadium.

== Honours ==
- Athenian League
  - Champions 1913–14
- London Senior Cup
  - Winners 1912–13, 1923–24
- Middlesex Charity Cup
  - Winners 1943–44

== Records ==
- Best FA Cup performance: Sixth qualifying round, 1921–22
- Best FA Amateur Cup performance: Finalists, 1919–20

== See also ==
- Tufnell Park F.C. players
