= Ekco Park F.C. =

Ekco Park
- Full name: Ekco Park Football Club
- Founded: 1929
- Ground: Ekco Sports Ground, Southend-on-Sea

Ekco Park Football Club is a football club based in Southend-on-Sea, England, currently competing in the Essex Olympian League.

== History ==
Ekco were founded in 1929, as a works team for the workers of EKCO in Southend-on-Sea. In 1930, the club joined the Southend Borough Combination. In 1945, Ekco joined the London League, entering the FA Cup for the first time in 1946. In 1981, the club joined the Essex Olympian League, remaining in the league until 2000.

In 2024, following time in the Southend Borough & District Football Combination, the club, renamed to Ekco Park, joined the Essex Olympian League Division Four South East.

== Ground ==
Upon formation, the club played at on a sports ground at Bournes Green, before moving to their current home of the Ecko Sports Ground in 1932.

== Records ==
- Best FA Cup performance: Second qualifying round, 1947–48
