= London League (football) =

Defunct English association football league

The London League was a football competition that was held in the London and surrounding areas of south-east England from 1896 until 1964.

In 1896 the president of the London League was Arnold Hills founder of Thames Ironworks F.C. (which later reformed as West Ham United). One of the men who helped draft the rules of the competition was Francis Payne, club secretary of Thames Ironworks F.C. in 1897. The league started with three divisions, the 3rd Grenadier Guards winning the inaugural championship.

The league fluctuated between having a single division and reaching four divisions. Before World War I, most of the senior London Football League clubs fielded a reserve side in the London League.

In 1964, the London League ceased to exist, merging with the Aetolian League to form the Greater London League, which then further merged in 1971 with the Metropolitan League to form the Metropolitan–London League. This later merged into the Spartan League, which in turn merged into the modern Spartan South Midlands League.

== Champions ==
=== London League Division One ===
- 1896–1897 – 3rd Grenadier Guards
- 1897–1898 – Thames Ironworks
- 1898–1899 – Tottenham Hotspur Reserves
- 1899–1901 – Millwall Athletic Reserves
- 1901–1902 – West Ham United
- 1902–1903 – Tottenham Hotspur
- 1903–1904 – Woolwich Arsenal Reserves
- 1904–1905 – Southall
- 1908–1909 – Brentford Reserves

=== London League Division Two ===
- 1896–1897 – Bromley
- 1897–1898 – Barnet
- 1898–1899 – Monsteds Athletic F.C.
- 1899–1900 – Fulham
- 1900–1901 – Airdrieonians
- 1901–1902 – East Greenwich Gas Works F.C.
- 1902–1903 – Brentford Reserves
- 1903–1904 – Catford Southend
- 1904–1905 – Clapton Orient Reserves
- 1911–1912 – Peel Institute

=== London League Premier Division ===
- 1901–1902 – West Ham United
- 1902–1903 – Tottenham Hotspur
- 1903–1904 – Millwall
- 1908–1909 – West Ham United

=== London League Division One A ===
- 1909–1910 – Barking

In 1920, a third division, known as Division Two was added

Year	Premier Division	Division One	Division Two
1920–21	Barking Town	Sterling Athletic	Wall End United
1921–22	Grays Athletic	Barking Town reserves	Wall End United
1922–23	Custom House	Millwall United	Hendon Town
1923–24	Leyton	S T D Athletic	Savoy Hotel

In 1924, Division Two was disbanded

Year	Premier Division	Division One
1924–25	Leyton	Bromley reserves
1925–26	Leyton	Bromley reserves
1926–27	Grays Athletic	Callender Athletic
1927–28	Epsom Town	Beckenham
1928–29	Mitcham Wanderers	Holland Athletic
1929–30	Grays Athletic	Park Royal
1930–31	Chelmsford	Park Royal
1931–32	Park Royal	Chelmsford reserves
1932–33	Park Royal	Leavesden Mental Hospital
1933–34	Park Royal	Eton Manor
1934–35	Park Royal	Northmet
1935–36	Leavesden Mental Hospital	Ford Sports
1936–37	Finchley	Briggs Motor Bodies
1937–38	Eton Manor	Northmet
1938–39	Dagenham Town	Briggs Motor Bodies

In 1939, the league was suspended due to the outbreak of the Second World War. On the resumption of football after the war, nineteen clubs played in the London League, split into Western and Eastern Divisions. Eastern Division champions Woolwich Polytechnic beat Western Champions Edgware Town 2–1 in a play-off final at the Crittall ground, Braintree on 4 May 1946.

Year	Eastern Division	Western Division
1945–46	Woolwich Polytechnic	Edgware Town

In 1946, the divisions were re-organised, and a new structure of a Premier Division and a Division One was formed

Year	Premier Division	Division One
1946–47	Chelmsford City reserves	Dagenham British Legion

Within 12 months, enough clubs had joined to form a new Division Two

Year	Premier Division	Division One	Division Two
1947–48	Chelmsford City reserves	Cheshunt	West Thurrock Athletic
1948–49	Guildford City reserves	Cheshunt	Vickers
1949–50	Cheshunt	Vickers	Bata Sports
1950–51	Dartford reserves	Aveley	Woodford Town reserves
1951–52	West Thurrock Athletic	London Transport	Pitsea United
1952–53	Eton Manor	Storey Athletic	Wapping Sports

In 1953, Division Two was disbanded

Year	Premier Division	Division One
1953–54	Eton Manor	London Transport
1954–55	Aveley	Wapping Sports
1955–56	Eton Manor	Bata Sports

In 1956, Division One was disbanded, leaving only a single Senior section

Year	Champions
1956–57	Cray Wanderers
1957–58	Cray Wanderers
1958–59	Tilbury
1959–60	Tilbury
1960–61	Tilbury
1961–62	Tilbury
1962–63	Chingford

In 1963, an increase in the number of clubs led to a reversion to two divisions.

Year	Premier Division	Division One
1963–64	Epping Town	CAV Athletic

== Member clubs ==
- 1st Grenadier Guards (1903–04)
- 21st Lancers (1905–06)
- 2nd Grenadier Guards (1897–98, 1913–14)
- 2nd Life Guards (1897–98)
- 3rd Grenadier Guards (1896–1898)
- Acton Reserves (1933–1935)
- Acton United and Aldine (1907–08)
- Algernon Athletic (1921–1924)
- Amersham Town (1961–62)
- Arlesey Town (1958–1960)
- Arsenal (1901–1904)
- Arsenal Reserves (1900–1915)
- Artillery College (1921–22)
- Aveley (1949–1957)
- Aveley Reserves (1951–52)
- Aylesford Paper Mills (1951–1954)
- Aylesford Paper Mills Reserves (1951–1953)
- Baldock Town (1959–1963)
- Barking (1909–1923)
- Barking Reserves (1913–1926)
- Barking Woodville (1896–1898)
- Barking Woodville Reserves (1896–97)
- Barkingside (1950–1964)
- Barkingside Reserves (1963–64)
- Barnet (1897–1900)
- Barnet Avenue (1905–1907)
- Barnet Alston (1904–1912)
- Barnet Reserves (1923–1926)
- Basildon Town (1955–1959)
- Bata Sports (1949–1956)
- Bata Sports Reserves (1950–1953)
- Beckenham Town (1923–1935, 1951–1961)
- Beckenham Town Reserves (1923–24, 1929–30, 1951–1953)
- Bedford Town Reserves (1946–1951)
- Belvedere (1920–1922)
- Bexleyheath Labour (1920–21)
- Bexleyheath Town (1924–1926)
- Blackwall and Thames Ironworks (1920–1922)
- Bletchley United (1959–1961)
- Boleyn Castle (1903–04)
- Bostall Athletic (1925–1927)
- Bostall Heath (1921–1939)
- Branbys Ironworks (1911–1913)
- Brentford (1896–1904)
- Brentford Reserves (1900–1913)
- Brentwood & Warley Reserves (1947–1951)
- Brentwood Mental Hospital (1926–1931)
- Briggs Sports Reserves (1935–1951)
- Brimsdown (1907–1910)
- British Legion (1923–24)
- Brittania (1946–47)
- Bromley (1896–1901)
- Bromley Old Boys (1921–22)
- Bromley Reserves (1924–1926)
- Bronze Athletic (1909–1914)
- Brymay Athletic (1920–1923)
- Burberry (1922–23)
- Bush Hill Park (1922–1924)
- Callender Athletic
- Canvey Island
- Carshalton Athletic
- Catford Southend
- Catford Southend Reserves
- CAV Athletic
- Chadwell Heath
- Chalfont National
- Chalfont St Peter
- Charlton Albion
- Charlton Athletic
- Charlton Athletic Reserves
- Chelmsford
- Chelmsford City Reserves
- Chelsea Reserves
- Cheshunt
- Cheshunt Reserves
- Childs Hill Imperial
- Chingford
- Chingford Reserves
- Chingford Town Reserves
- Chingford United
- Chiswick Town
- Chiswick Town Reserves
- City of Westminster
- Clapham Reserves
- Clapton Orient
- Clapton Orient Reserves
- Commercial Athletic
- Commercial Gas
- Covent Garden
- Cray Wanderers
- Crittall Athletic
- Crittall Athletic Reserves
- Crouch End
- Crouch End Reserves
- Croydon Common Reserves
- Crystal Palace Reserves
- Custom House
- Custom House Reserves
- CWS Silvertown
- Dagenham British Legion
- Dagenham British Legion Reserves
- Dagenham Cables
- Dagenham Park
- Dagenham Town
- Dagenham Town Reserves
- Dartford Reserves
- De Havilland
- De Havilland Vampires
- Depot RHA
- Deptford Invicta
- Deptford Town
- Derrick Wanderers
- Downshall
- Earlsfield Town
- East Greenwich Gas
- East Ham United
- Edgware Town
- Edmonton
- Edmonton Borough
- Edmonton Borough Reserves
- Ekco
- Ekco Reserves
- Eltham
- Enfield
- Enfield Cables
- Enfield Reserves
- Epping Town
- Epping Town Reserves
- Epsom
- Epsom Reserves
- Epsom Town
- Epsom Town Reserves
- Erith & Belvedere
- Erith & Belvedere Reserves
- Eton Manor
- Eton Manor 'A'
- Eton Manor Reserves
- Eton Mission
- Excelsior
- Felstead
- Finchley
- Finchley Reserves
- Ford Sports
- Ford Sports Reserves
- Forest Swifts
- Fulham
- Fulham 'A'
- Fulham Reserves
- Fulham St Andrew's
- Gnome Athletic
- Gravesend & Northfleet Reserves
- Grays Athletic
- Grays Athletic Reserves
- Grays Town
- Great Northern Railway
- Great Western Railway
- Guildford City Reserves
- Guildhall
- Gwynnes Athletic
- Hammersmith Athletic
- Hampstead Town
- Hampstead Town Reserves
- Hanwell
- Hanwell Town
- Harlesden Town
- Harlow Town
- Harold Hill
- Harris Lebus
- Harris Lebus Reserves
- Harrow Athletic
- Harrow United
- Harrow Weald
- Harrow Weald Reserves
- Hastings United Reserves
- Hatfield Town
- Hatfield Town Reserves
- Hayesco Sports
- Hays Wharf
- Hendon
- Hendon Reserves
- Hendon Town
- Hermes
- Hermes Reserves
- Highfield
- HMSO Press
- Holland Athletic
- Hotel Cecil
- Hounslow
- Ideal Wanderers
- Ilford
- Ilford Electrical
- Ilford Reserves
- Imperial
- Islington Town
- Jurgens (Purfleet)
- Jurgens (Purfleet) Reserves
- Kilburn
- Kingston
- Lathol Athletic
- Lea Bridge Gas
- Leavesden
- Leavesden Hospital
- Leyton
- Leyton Reserves
- Livesey United
- London Generals
- London Labour
- London Telecoms
- London Transport
- London Transport Buses
- London Transport Reserves
- London Welsh
- Lower Clapton
- Lower Clapton Imperial
- Merton Town
- Metrogas
- Metrogas Reserves
- Metropolitan Police Reserves
- Metropolitan Railway
- Millwall
- Millwall Reserves
- Millwall United
- Mitcham Wanderers
- Mitcham Wanderers Reserves
- Monsteads Athletic
- Neasden
- New Barnet
- New Malden
- North Woolwich
- North Woolwich Invicta
- Northern Polytechnic
- Northern Polytechnic Reserves
- Northmet
- Norwood Association
- Novocastrians
- Nunhead Reserves
- Old Aloysians
- Old Charlton
- Old Ignatians
- Old Tottonians
- Orient (old)
- Orpington
- Page Green Old Boys
- Park Royal
- Park Royal Reserves
- Parkhill (Chingford)
- Pearl Assurance
- Peel Institute
- Perrycobow
- Perrycobow Reserves
- Pinner
- Pitsea United
- PO Telecoms
- Ponders End United
- Port of London Authority
- Port of London Authority Police
- Post Office Engineers
- Post Office Engineers Reserves
- Queens Park Rangers
- Queens Park Rangers Reserves
- RAF Kidbrooke
- Rainham Town
- Rainham Town Reserves
- Ravenscourt Amateurs
- Redhill
- RFA Record Office
- RNVR
- Roehampton
- ROF Sports
- Rolenmill
- Romford
- Romford Reserves
- Romford Town
- Royal Naval Depot (Chatham)
- Royal Ordnance Factories
- Ruislip Manor
- Ruislip Manor Reserves
- Savoy Hotel
- Seven Kings
- Shepherd's Bush
- Shepherd's Bush Reserves
- Siemens Sports
- Slade Green Athletic
- Slade Green Athletic Reserves
- Snaresbrook United
- South West Ham
- Southall
- Southall Reserves
- Southern United
- Standard Telephones
- Stanley
- Stanmore
- Stansted
- STD Athletic
- Sterling Athletic
- Stonebridge Park
- Stones Athletic
- Storey Athletic
- Storey Athletic Reserves
- Streatham Town
- Streatham Town Reserves
- Summerstown
- Summerstown Reserves
- Tate Institute
- Telcon Athletic
- Temple Mills
- Tilbury
- Tilbury Reserves
- Tillings Athletic
- Tonbridge Reserves
- Tooting and Mitcham United
- Tooting and Mitcham United Reserves
- Tooting Town
- Tottenham Hotspur
- Tottenham Hotspur Reserves
- Transport Workers
- Tufnell Park (1907–1914)
- Tunbridge Wells Rangers (1963–64)
- UGBM Sports (1929–1952)
- Ulysses
- Ulysses Reserves
- University
- Uxbridge
- Uxbridge Reserves
- Vampires
- Van Den Bergh
- Venner Sports
- Vickers Armstrong
- Vickers Armstrong Reserves
- Wall End United (1920–1923)
- Waltham (1906–1910)
- Walthamstow Avenue (1901–02)
- Walthamstow Borough (1926–27)
- Walthamstow Grange (1906–1930)
- Walthamstow Holborn (1898–1900)
- Walthamstow Town (1896–97, 1899–1901, 1902–1904, 1923–1926)
- Walthamstow Town Reserves (1923–24)
- Walton & Hersham Reserves (1945–46)
- Walton-on-Thames (1937–1939)
- Walton-on-Thames Reserves (1938–1939)
- Wandgas Athletic (1936–1939)
- Wandsworth (1900–1903)
- Wandsworth United (1937–1939)
- Wapping Sports (1950–56)
- Waterlows (1920–21)
- Watney Sports (1929–30)
- Wealdstone (1911–1922)
- Welwyn Garden City (1951–1955)
- Welwyn Garden City Reserves (1951–52)
- West Croydon (1896–98)
- West Ham United (1896–1898, 1899–1900, 1901–1904)
- West Ham United Reserves (1900–1915)
- West Hampstead (1897–1899, 1904–05, 1907–1910)
- West London Old Boys (1910–1914)
- West Norwood (1900–01, 1910–1913, 1923–24, 1936–37)
- West Thurrock Athletic (1947–1964)
- West Thurrock Athletic Reserves (1952–53)
- Whyteleafe Albion (1929–1931)
- Willesden (1957–1959)
- Willesden Green (1899–1900)
- Willesden Town (1898–99)
- Willesden Town Reserves (1904–05)
- Wingate (1952–1962)
- Wingate Reserves (1952–53)
- Wood Green Town (1909–1913)
- Woodford (1909–10)
- Woodford Town (1945–1951)
- Woodford Town Reserves (1946–1951)
- Woolwich (1913–14, 1927–28)
- Woolwich Ordnance (1919–1921)
- Woolwich Polytechnic (1901–1905, 1924–1964)
- Wren Athletic (1922–1924)
