= Essex Olympian Football League =

Association football league in England

- Founded: 1966
- Country: England
- Number of clubs: 91 (six senior divisions)
- Level on pyramid: Level 11 (Premier Division)
- Feeder to: Eastern Counties Football League
- Promotion to: Eastern Counties Football League Division One South
- Current champions: Catholic United (2025–26)
- Website: Official website

The Essex Olympian Football League is a football competition based in England, founded in the 1966–67 season. It has a total of six senior divisions and one under 21 division. The Premier Division sits at step 7 (or level 11) of the National League System and it is a feeder to Division One South of the Eastern Counties Football League. Between 1986 and 2005, the league was known as the Essex Intermediate League.

Clubs to progress up the pyramid from the league include Billericay Town, Brentwood Town, Bowers United, Sawbridgeworth Town, Burnham Ramblers, Hullbridge Sports and Great Wakering Rovers.

== History ==
In 1966, the Essex Olympian Football League was founded, following a meeting at the Saracens Head pub in Chelmsford. The first league constitution consisted of Basildon & Pitsea, Billericay Town, Bishop's Stortford Swifts, Bowers United, Burnham Ramblers, Collier Row, Dorstel Press, Dunmow, Little Waltham, Old Chelmsfordians and Sawbridgeworth, with Burnham Ramblers winning the first edition of the Essex Olympian League, finishing four points above Little Waltham. Little Waltham left the league at the end of the inaugural 1966–67 season, with British Mathews, Critalls, Essex County Council Staff and Manor Athletic all joining to take the constitution up to 16 clubs. In 1981, a Second Division was added with eight clubs (Baddow Royals, Basildon Sports, Caribbean International Sports, Chigwell Villa, Civil Service Olympian, Cossor Sports, Ekco and Rayleigh Athletic) joining the league system.

In 1986, the league was renamed to the Essex Intermediate League, adding a Division Three three years later.

In 2005, the league renamed itself back to its original Essex Olympian League name. In 2008, Takeley moved up the pyramid into the Essex Senior League. Before then the Olympian League had not sent a club to the Essex Senior League for over a decade, causing the Essex Senior League to look elsewhere in Essex for new member clubs, including lower leagues and leagues outside the National League System such as the now-defunct Essex Business Houses Football League. Clubs from this league have previously been able to jump straight into the Essex Senior League due to the facilities at which they play, not where they finished in the Essex Business Houses League. The following year, in 2009, a Division Three was added, taking the number of leagues administered by the Essex Olympian League up to four. In 2015, two more leagues were added to the system, being named Division Four and Division Five. In 2017, The Football Association announced a step 6 (level 10) division for Essex and East Anglia in the Eastern Counties Football League to start playing in the 2018–19 season, meaning the Essex Olympian League would drop to step 7 in Non-league. In March 2020, as a result of the COVID-19 pandemic, the Football Association announced all leagues from step 3 to 7 on the National League System would be cancelled, with all results being expunged. In November 2020, the Essex Olympian League was suspended, owing to a second wave of COVID-19 in the United Kingdom. The league was eventually resumed in April 2021, becoming one of the only leagues in England to resume play after the suspension in November 2020. Buckhurst Hill were promoted at the end of the 2020–21 season, after winning the Premier Division, gaining promotion to the Eastern Counties League Division One South.

Ahead of the 2024–25 season, the Southend Borough & District Combination was merged into the Essex Olympian League, resulting in the creation of two regionalised divisions at Division Four and the return of Division Five.

== Member clubs (2026–27) ==
The league has 98 teams spread over eight divisions for the 2025–26 season:

Premier Division
- ACD United
- Barnston
- Bishop's Stortford Swifts
- Canning Town
- Catholic United
- Corinthians
- Harold Hill
- Harold Wood Athletic
- Hashtag United Reserves
- Hutton Reserves
- Leigh Ramblers
- Old Chelmsfordians
- Old Southendians
- Shenfield
- Sungate
- Wakering Sports

Division One

- Basildon Town Reserves
- Beacon Hill Rovers
- Catholic United Reserves
- Harold Wood Athletic Reserves
- Herongate Athletic
- Kelvedon Hatch
- Leigh Town
- Manford Way
- May & Baker 'A'
- Pitsea Athletic
- Rawreth Lane
- Roydon
- Runwell Sports

Division Two

- Benfleet Reserves
- BKS Sports
- Broomfield
- Galleywood
- Herongate Athletic Reserves
- Leigh Ramblers Reserves
- Manford Way 'A'
- Old Southendian Reserves
- South Woodham Ferrers United
- Toby
- Wakering Sports Reserves
- Wickford Town

Division Three North West

- Bishop's Stortford Swifts Reserves
- Blackmore
- Boreham & Sandon Royals
- Canning Town Reserves
- Collier Row
- Epping Town
- Hannakins Farm
- Harold Hill Reserves
- Hutton 'A'
- Rayleigh Town 'A'
- Shenfield Reserves
- Springfield

Division Three South East

- AS Rawreth
- ATF Southend
- Basildon Town 'A'
- BKS Sports Reserves
- East Thurrock Community Reserves
- Finesse
- Hutton 'B'
- Rayleigh
- Shoebury Town
- South Essex United
- Woodham Radars

Division Four North West

- Barnston Reserves
- Berry Boys
- Boreham & Sandon Reserves
- Broomfield Reserves
- Galleywood Reserves
- Harold Wood Athletic 'A'
- Herongate Athletic 'A'
- Leytonstone United
- Old Chelmsfordians Reserves
- Pitsea Athletic Reserves
- Runwell Sports Reserves
- Shenfield 'A'

Division Four South East

- Ashingdon
- Benfleet Development
- Catholic United 'A'
- Ekco Park
- Leigh Ramblers 'A'
- Old Southendian 'A'
- Pitsea Town
- Southend Collegians
- Southminster United
- Tillingham Hotspur

Division Five North and West

- Ashingdon Reserves
- Ekco Park Reserves
- Galleywood 'A'
- Harold Wood Athletic 'B'
- FC Highend
- Hutton 'C'
- Old Moulsham
- Pitsea Athletic 'A'
- South Essex Rovers Reserves
- Upminster Albion
- Wickford Town Reserves

Division Five South and East

- AS Rawreth U-23
- ATF Southend Reserves
- BKS Sports Development
- Corinthians Reserves
- Ekco Park Reserves
- Leigh Town Reserves
- Rayleigh Reserves
- Rochford Town Reserves
- Shoebury Town Reserves
- Southend Collegians 'A'
- Southend Collegians Reserves
- Wakering Sports 'A'

== Past champions ==
=== 1966–81 ===
The league originally consisted of a single section of 13 clubs, reaching a peak of 18 clubs by 1969–70.

Season	Champions
1966–67	Burnham Ramblers
1967–68	Writtle
1968–69	Basildon Town
1969–70	Billericay Town
1970–71	Billericay Town
1971–72	Sawbridgeworth
1972–73	Chadwell Heath
1973–74	Chadwell Heath
1974–75	Chadwell Heath
1975–76	Essex Police
1976–77	Collier Row Motor Gear
1977–78	Runwell Hospital
1978–79	Rayleigh Town
1979–80	Essex Police
1980–81	Rayleigh Town

=== 1981–89 ===
In 1981, a second division was added. The league ran with two divisions for nine years. During this period, the league was renamed the Essex Intermediate League in 1986.

Season	Division One	Division Two
1981–82	Herongate Athletic	Rayleigh Athletic
1982–83	Herongate Athletic	Dunmow
1983–84	Rayleigh Town	Essex Police
1984–85	Rayleigh Town	Shell Club
1985–86	Essex Police	Cossor Sports
1986–87	Essex Police	Hambros Bank
1987–88	Takeley	Standard (Harlow)
1988–89	Benfleet	Upminster

=== 1989–2007 ===
In 1989, a third division was added. The league reverted to its original name, the Essex Olympian League in 2005.

Season	Division One	Division Two	Division Three
1989–90	Rayleigh Town	Kelvedon Hatch	Great Baddow
1990–91	Herongate Athletic	Concord Rangers	Great Wakering Rovers
1991–92	Standard (Harlow)	Great Wakering Rovers	Loughton
1992–93	Standard (Harlow)	South Woodham Ferrers	Danbury Trafford
1993–94	Kelvedon Hatch	Takeley	Ongar Town
1994–95	Writtle	Sporting Club Henderson	Great Baddow
1995–96	Kelvedon Hatch	Frenford Senior	Hutton
1996–97	Kelvedon Hatch	Runwell Hospital	Bishop's Stortford Swifts
1997–98	Danbury Trafford	Bishop's Stortford Swifts	Shell Club
1998–99	Bishop's Stortford Swifts	Sandon Royals	Basildon Town
1999–2000	Bishop's Stortford Swifts	Nortel (Harlow)	Wanstead Town
2000–01	Rayleigh Town	Canning Town	Linford Wanderers
2001–02	Takeley	Epping	Stambridge United
2002–03	Bishop's Stortford Swifts	White Ensign	Debden Sports
2003–04	White Ensign	Debden Sports	Faces
2004–05	White Ensign	White Notley	Linford Wanderers
2005–06	Harold Wood Athletic	Canning Town	Ongar Town
2006–07	White Ensign	Benfleet	Potter Street

=== 2007 to date ===
In 2007 the divisions were renamed Premier, One and Two.

Season	Premier Division	Division One	Division Two
2007–08	White Ensign	Potter Street	Linford Wanderers
2008–09	Harold Wood Athletic	Westhamians	Sungate
2009–10	Harold Wood Athletic	May & Baker Club	Romford Reserves

In 2010 a Division Three was added.

Season	Premier Division	Division One	Division Two	Division Three
2010–11	Kelvedon Hatch	Hutton	Wadham Lodge	Springfield
2011–12	Frenford Senior	Southminster St. Leonards	Springfield	Old Barkabbeyans
2012–13	Frenford Senior	Bishop's Stortford Swifts	Old Barkabbeyans	Debden Sports

In 2013 an Under 21 Division was added.

Season	Premier Division	Division One	Division Two	Division Three	Under 21 Division
2013–14	Southminster St Leonards	Newham United	Ongar Town	Rochford Town	Ryan
2014–15	Harold Wood Athletic	Harold Hill	Basildon Town	Catholic United	Frenford Senior

In 2015 the two reserve divisions were promoted to senior status and renamed Divisions Four and Five, along with the three higher divisions, leaving just one Under-21 division below that.

Season	Premier Division	Division One	Division Two	Division Three	Division Four	Division Five	Under 21 Division
2015–16	Kelvedon Hatch	Canning Town	Catholic United	Benfleet	Old Chelmsfordians Reserves	Galleywood Reserves	FC Clacton
2016–17	Springfield	Basildon Town	Sungate	May & Baker Eastbrook Reserves	Manford Way Reserves	Basildon Town Reserves	Lakeside
2017–18	Catholic United	Buckhurst Hill	May & Baker Eastbrook Reserves	Manford Way Reserves	Chingford Athletic	Westhamians	Corinthians
2018–19	Buckhurst Hill	Shenfield	Chingford Athletic	Old Southendian Reserves	Corinthians	Corinthians Reserves	
2019–20	Cancelled due to the COVID-19 pandemic						
2020–21	Buckhurst Hill	Ongar Town	Leigh Town	ACD United	Catholic United Reserves	Wakering Sports 'A'	
2021–22	Ongar Town	Toby	ACD United	Hashtag United Development	Chingford Athletic Reserves	Bishop's Stortford Swifts Reserves	
2022–23	Hutton	Old Chelmsfordians	Shoebury Town	Basildon Town Reserves	Leigh Ramblers Reserves	Manford Way Reserves	
2023–24	Rayleigh Town	Wakering Sports	Basildon Town Reserves	Runwell Sports Reserves	Toby Reserves		

In 2024, Division Four split into Division Four North West and Division Four South East.

Season	Premier Division	Division One	Division Two	Division Three	Division Four North West	Division Four South East	Division Five
2024–25	Old Chelmsfordians	Corinthians	Hutton Reserves	Rawreth Lane	Broomfield	South Essex United	ATF Southend

In 2025, Division Three also split into North West and South East, matching Division Four.

Season	Premier Division	Division One	Division Two	Division Three North West	Division Three South East	Division Four North West	Division Four South East	Division Five
2025–26	Catholic United	Hutton Reserves	Roydon	Broomfield	Benfleet Reserves	Hutton 'B'	ATF Southend	Leigh Ramblers 'A'

In 2026, Division Five also split into North West and South East, matching Divisions Three and Four.

Season	Premier Division	Division One	Division Two	Division Three North West	Division Three South East	Division Four North West	Division Four South East	Division Five North West	Division Five South East
2026–27									
