= Dagenham Park F.C. =

Dagenham Park
- Full name: Dagenham Park Football Club
- Founded: 1946
- Dissolved: 1955
- Ground: Glebe Road, Dagenham
- Final season; 1954–55: London League Division One, 11th of 11

Dagenham Park Football Club was a football club based in Dagenham, England.

== History ==
Founded following World War II by officials of Dagenham Town, Dagenham British Legion joined the London League, winning Division One in the first season of the club. Dagenham British Legion also entered the FA Cup for the first time in the 1946–47 season, losing 8–1 away to Harwich & Parkeston. In 1954, Dagenham British Legion evolved into Dagenham Park, remaining in the London League.

== Ground ==
The club initially played at the Merry Fiddlers Ground in Becontree Heath, before moving to Glebe Road in Dagenham.

== Records ==
- Best FA Cup performance: First qualifying round, 1947–48
