= Jude Bellingham =

English footballer (born 2003)

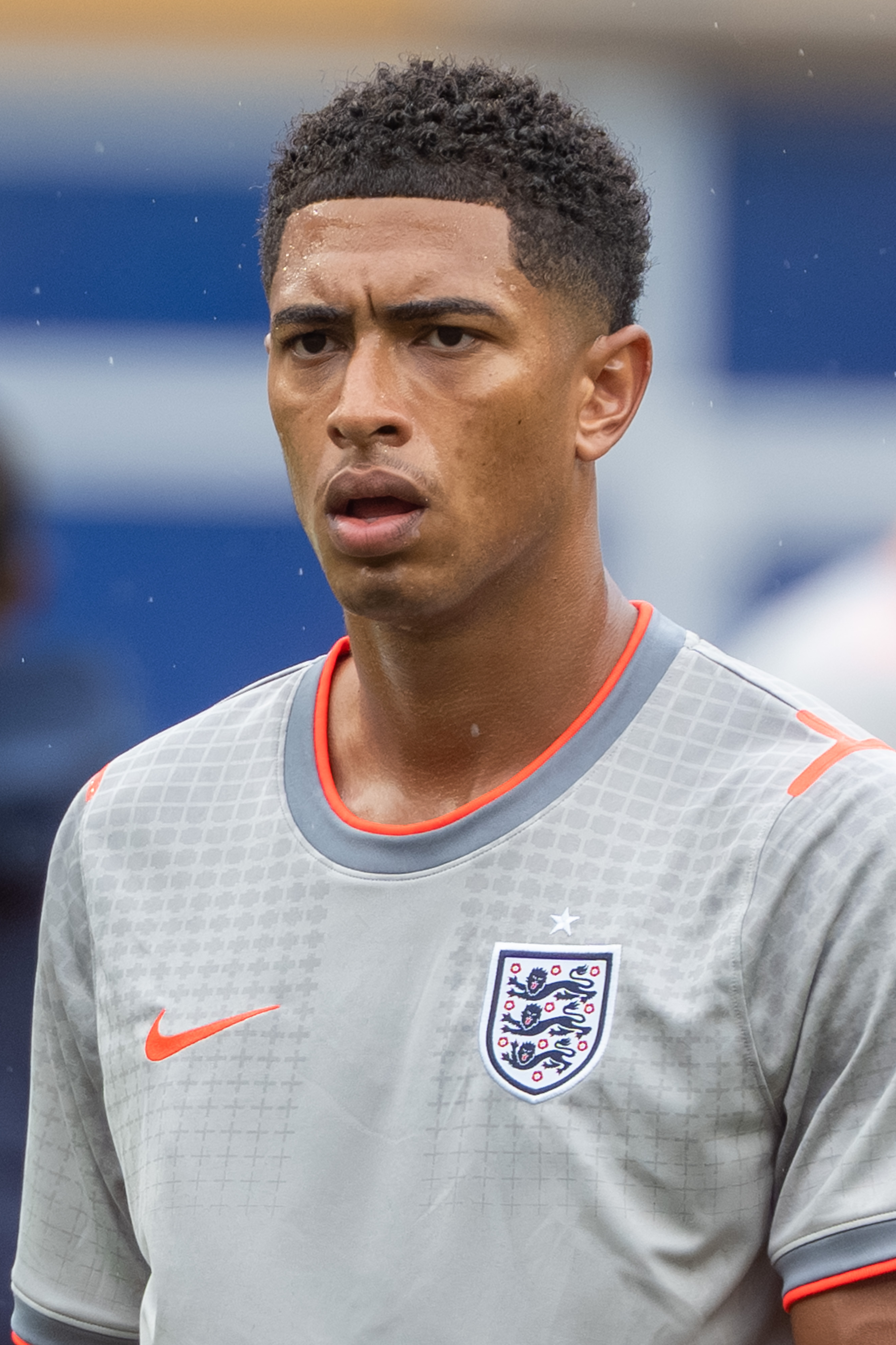
- Bellingham with England in 2026

Personal information
- Full name: Jude Victor William Bellingham
- Date of birth: 29 June 2003 (age 23)
- Place of birth: Stourbridge, West Midlands, England
- Height: 6 ft 1 in (1.86 m)
- Positions: Attacking midfielder; central midfielder

Team information
- Current team: Real Madrid
- Number: 5

Youth career
- 2009–2010: Stourbridge Juniors
- 2010–2019: Birmingham City

Senior career*
| Years | Team | Apps | (Gls) |
| 2019–2020 | Birmingham City | 41 | (4) |
| 2020–2023 | Borussia Dortmund | 92 | (12) |
| 2023– | Real Madrid | 100 | (39) |

International career^{‡}
| 2016–2018 | England U15 | 8 | (1) |
| 2018–2019 | England U16 | 11 | (4) |
| 2019 | England U17 | 3 | (2) |
| 2020 | England U21 | 4 | (1) |
| 2020– | England | 62 | (14) |
Medal record
Men's football
Representing England
FIFA World Cup
| Third place | 2026 Canada–Mexico–US |
UEFA European Championship
| Runner-up | 2020 Europe |
| Runner-up | 2024 Germany |
- * Club domestic league appearances and goals as of 22:03, 21 November 2026 (UTC) ‡ National team caps and goals as of 21:50, 15 November 2026 (UTC)

Jude Victor William Bellingham (born 29 June 2003) is an English professional footballer who plays as an attacking midfielder for La Liga club Real Madrid and the England national team. Widely regarded as one of the best players in the world, he is known for his dribbling, finishing and ball-winning ability.

Bellingham joined Birmingham City as an under-8, became the club's youngest first-team player when he made his senior debut in August 2019 at the age of 16, and played regularly during the 2019–20 season. He signed with Borussia Dortmund in July 2020, and in his first appearance became the club's youngest goal-scorer. Over three seasons with the club he made 132 appearances and won the 2020–21 DFB-Pokal; his performances in the 2022–23 season helped Dortmund finish as runners-up and earned him the Bundesliga Player of the Season award. Later that year, he won the European Golden Boy and the Kopa Trophy.

Bellingham signed for Real Madrid in 2023 for €103 million. In his first season, he was the club's top league scorer, helping them to the league title and Champions League, and was voted La Liga Player of the Season. He was included in the FIFPRO World 11 for four consecutive years (2023–2026), and finished third in voting for the Ballon d'Or and The Best FIFA Men's Player in 2024.

Bellingham represented England at the under-15, under-16, under-17, and under-21 levels. He made his first appearance for the senior team in November 2020, and was part of the squads for the UEFA European Championship in 2020 and 2024, as well as the FIFA World Cup in 2022 and 2026. At the 2026 World Cup, Bellingham helped England finish in third place as he scored seven goals, making him England's all-time highest goal-scorer in a single World Cup tournament.

== Early life and education ==
Jude Victor William Bellingham was born on 29 June 2003 in Stourbridge, in the county of West Midlands in England. He is the eldest son of Denise and Mark Bellingham. He is of Afro-Jamaican descent through his mother and Irish descent through his father. His paternal grandfather, William Bellingham, served in the British Army in Berlin before becoming a teacher and the head of modern foreign languages at Southend High School for Boys, and was a strong influence on Jude's patriotism and values. Jude's father was a sergeant in the West Midlands Police until 2022, and was a prolific goalscorer in non-League football. Jude's younger brother, Jobe, is also a footballer. Jude was privately educated at Priory School in Edgbaston, Birmingham. He graduated from Loughborough College with a BTEC level 3 certificate in sport in 2021. He grew up idolising Zinedine Zidane.

== Club career ==
=== Birmingham City ===
Bellingham joined Birmingham City as an under-8 after playing for Stourbridge Juniors. He played for Birmingham's under-18 team at age 14, and made his debut for their under-23 team at age 15. In his first game for the U-23 team, he scored the only goal as Birmingham defeated Nottingham Forest 1–0 on 15 October 2018. By March 2019, Bellingham had scored three goals from ten development squad appearances. He was featured in FourFourTwo's list of the "50 most exciting teenagers in English football" and was drawing the interest of major European clubs. He was gradually introduced to the first-team environment, which included training with the team and accompanying them to an EFL Championship match in March 2019.

Bellingham took up a two-year scholarship with Birmingham City to begin in July 2019. He was part of the first-team training camp in Portugal, played and scored in pre-season friendlies, and was given squad number 22 for the 2019–20 season. On 6 August, when he started the EFL Cup first round visit to Portsmouth, Bellingham became the youngest first-team player in Birmingham City's history, at 16 years and 38 days. He played for 80 minutes in the 3–0 loss, and was the Birmingham Mail's man of the match. He made his first Football League appearance 19 days later, as a second-half substitute in a 3–0 loss to Swansea City, and made his home debut on 31 August against Stoke City. Replacing the injured Jefferson Montero after half an hour, Bellingham scored the winning goal as Birmingham defeated Stoke 2–1, becoming the club's youngest goalscorer. He started the next match against Charlton Athletic two weeks later, scoring the only goal in a 1–0 win.

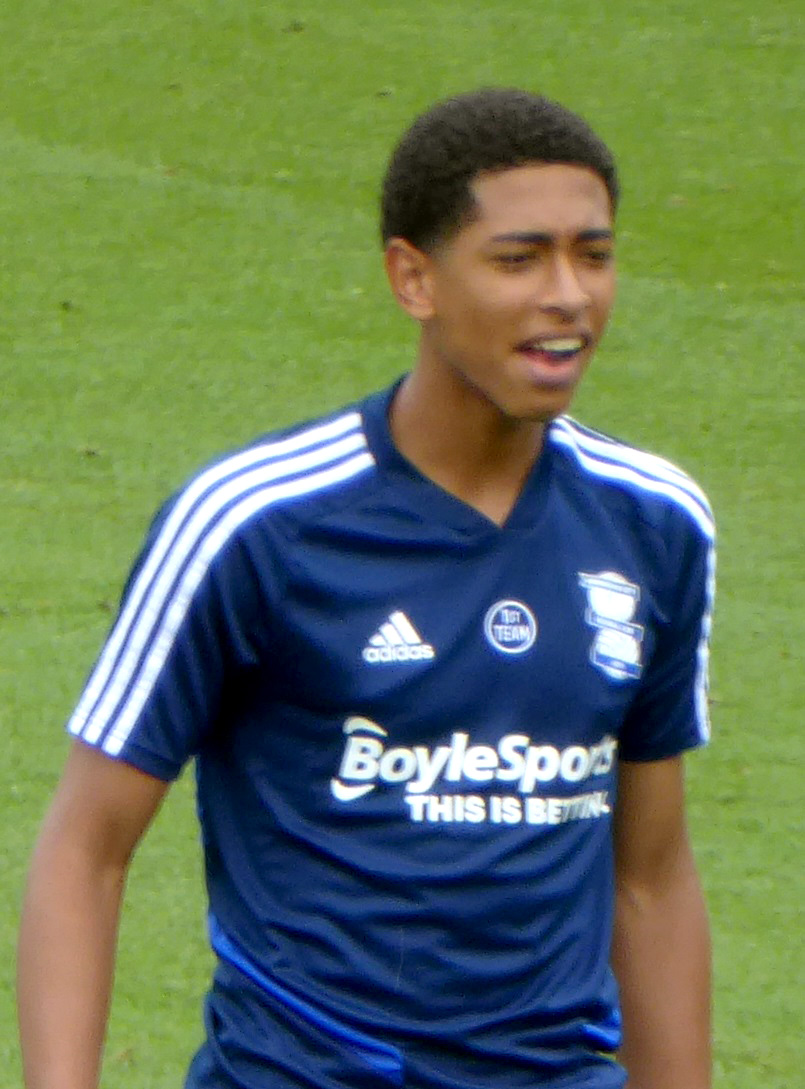
Bellingham with Birmingham City in 2019

Bellingham became a regular starter for Birmingham. He began on the left wing, was moved into central midfield to help him gain confidence, and then was used in a more "advanced" role once staff felt he could handle the responsibility. According to head coach Pep Clotet, Bellingham felt "comfortable" in the midfield, particularly when he was near the opposing team's penalty area. Bellingham was EFL Young Player of the Month for November 2019. Various major clubs showed interest in Bellingham in January 2020, and on deadline day Birmingham reportedly turned down a £20 million bid from Manchester United. When the season was suspended due to the COVID-19 pandemic, Bellingham had made 32 league appearances. He remained an integral part of the team once the season resumed behind closed doors. He finished the season with four goals from 44 appearances in all competitions. In appreciation of what Bellingham achieved in such a short time with the first team, the club announced that they would retire his number 22 shirt, "to remember one of our own and to inspire others." At the EFL Awards, he was named both Championship Apprentice of the Year and EFL Young Player of the Season.

=== Borussia Dortmund ===
It was clear that Bellingham would leave Birmingham, and it was reported that he and his father had visited several major clubs, of which Manchester United and Bundesliga club Borussia Dortmund were the favourites. Impressed by Dortmund's record of including young players as regulars in the first team, as evidenced by the likes of Jadon Sancho, Bellingham reportedly settled on the club as his destination of choice. He flew to Germany for a medical, and the transfer was confirmed on 20 July 2020. Bellingham was to join after Birmingham's last match of the season. The undisclosed fee was understood by Sky Sports to be an initial £25 million – making him the most expensive 17-year-old in history – plus "several million more" dependent on performance-related criteria.

==== 2020–2021: Transfer and record-breaking achievements ====
Bellingham made his debut on 14 September 2020, starting the first match of the 2020–21 season against third-tier MSV Duisburg in the DFB-Pokal, aged 17 years, 77 days. After half an hour, he scored the second goal in a 5–0 win, becoming the club's youngest goalscorer in the DFB-Pokal, taking six days off Giovanni Reyna's record, as well as their youngest scorer in any competitive match, breaking Nuri Şahin's record by five days. Five days later, he marked his league debut with the assist for Reyna's opening goal in a 3–0 win over Borussia Mönchengladbach, and was named as Bundesliga Rookie of the Month for September. When Bellingham faced Lazio in the group stage on 20 October, aged 17 years and 113 days, he became the youngest Englishman to start a UEFA Champions League match, breaking the record previously set by Phil Foden.

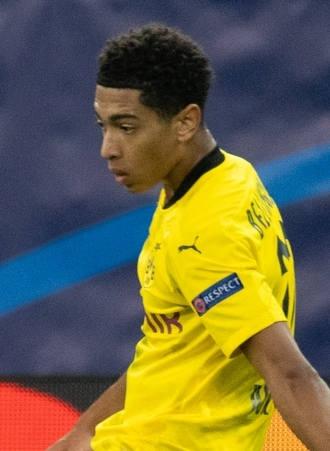
Bellingham playing for Borussia Dortmund in 2020

In the first three months of the season, Bellingham was a regular in all competitions, with six starts and seven substitute appearances in the Bundesliga as well as four Champions League starts. He missed the first two matches of 2021 with a foot injury, but returned to action as an increasingly regular starter. He scored his first Bundesliga goal from Reyna's knock-down to equalise with VfB Stuttgart early in the second half of a 3–2 win on 10 April. His first Champions League goal came four days later against Manchester City in the quarter-final second leg, but Dortmund could not retain their away-goal advantage. Bellingham started in Dortmund's 4–1 victory over RB Leipzig in the 2021 DFB-Pokal final. He was booked in the first half and replaced by Thorgan Hazard at half-time with his team 3–0 ahead. He finished the season with 29 appearances and one goal in the Bundesliga, 46 appearances and four goals in all competitions, and was voted Newcomer of the Season by his fellow players. Bellingham was runner-up to Pedri of Barcelona in the 2021 Kopa Trophy, awarded to the world's best under-21 male player as voted by previous winners of the Ballon d'Or.

==== 2021–2023: Bundesliga Player of the Season and league runner-up ====
On 4 December 2021, Bellingham played in Der Klassiker against Bayern Munich. He made the assists for both Dortmund goals, but Bayern won the match 3–2 via a 77th-minute penalty awarded after lengthy VAR involvement. Earlier in the fixture, two Dortmund penalty appeals were turned down by referee Felix Zwayer, who refused to review either. Interviewed live by Viaplay immediately after the match, Bellingham was critical of Zwayer's decisions, and made reference to his part in the 2005 German football match-fixing scandal, saying: "You give a referee, that has match fixed before, the biggest game in Germany. What do you expect?" The German Football Association (DFB) wrote to Bellingham asking for his comments as a matter of urgency, and he was fined €40,000.

On 22 October 2022, Bellingham scored twice in a 5–0 defeat of Stuttgart that put Borussia Dortmund into the top four; his first opened the scoring from a rapid attack that he both started and finished, his second was a skilfully curved shot early in the second half. On the final day of the Bundesliga season, Dortmund needed to beat Mainz 05 to ensure the league title. Bellingham was on the bench because of an injured knee, and remained unused. Dortmund managed to draw after falling 2–0 behind, but Bayern Munich's 89th-minute winner against 1. FC Köln was enough to put them ahead on goal difference. After the match, a tearful Bellingham pushed cameras away as he left the field. His performances earned him the Bundesliga Player of the Season award. Having finished as runner-up two years prior, Bellingham won the Kopa Trophy in 2023 in recognition of his performances over the 2022–23 season for Dortmund and for England in the 2022 FIFA World Cup. He became the first Englishman to receive the award, which was presented at the 2023 Ballon d'Or ceremony in October. He placed 18th in the Ballon d'Or voting.

=== Real Madrid ===
On 14 June 2023, La Liga club Real Madrid announced the signing of Bellingham on a six-year contract. Borussia Dortmund received a base transfer fee of €103 million with potential to rise by 30% to approximately €133.9 million due to add-ons, from which a sell-on clause earned Birmingham City around £6 million. He became the sixth Englishman to join Real Madrid in the professional era. (Note: The previous five were Laurie Cunningham, Steve McManaman, David Beckham, Michael Owen and Jonathan Woodgate.)

==== 2023–24: Debut season and goalscoring records ====
On 12 August 2023, Bellingham marked his debut with a close-range half-volleyed goal from a corner kick in a 2–0 La Liga win away to Athletic Bilbao. Two goals and an assist for Vinícius Júnior in a 3–1 victory at Almería and the winner at Celta Vigo in the two remaining August matches made him the league's top scorer and the first English recipient of the La Liga Player of the Month award. A 95th-minute winner against Getafe on 2 September in his first match at the newly renovated Santiago Bernabéu made Bellingham the third player (after Cristiano Ronaldo in the 2009–10 season and Pepillo in 1959–60) to score in each of his first four competitive appearances for the club. Bellingham scored 10 goals in his first 10 matches for Madrid, equalling Cristiano Ronaldo's goal tally after his first 10 games for the club in 2009. On 28 October, Bellingham scored a brace, including a stoppage-time winner, to secure Real Madrid a 2–1 away win against their rivals Barcelona, making him the first Real Madrid player to score in their La Liga and Champions League debuts for the club and in El Clásico. His first goal, scored from 30 yards (27 m) was his club's 300th in El Clásico and made him the first Englishman to score in that fixture since Michael Owen in 2005. Bellingham set several records with these goals. (Note: Bellingham became the first player to score a brace in his first El Clásico since Pedro Arsuaga in 1947, and the fourth player under 21 years old to score multiple goals in that encounter in La Liga, following Jaime Lazcano in 1930, Arsuaga in 1947 and Lionel Messi in 2007. His ten goals from his first ten league matches exceeded Cristiano Ronaldo's tally of seven for Madrid in 2009, and equalled the most league goals scored in a single season by Zinedine Zidane across an 18-year career. Bellingham's 13 goals from his first 13 games at the club equalled the starts of Cristiano Ronaldo and Alfredo Di Stéfano.) His coach Carlo Ancelotti commented: "He seems like a veteran, the goal to level it totally changed the game... Today he was stupendous and shocked everyone with his wonderful goal from the edge of the area." Bellingham was named La Liga Player of the Month for October.

Having received the Kopa Trophy a few weeks earlier, Bellingham was named winner of the Golden Boy for 2023, an award made to the best male under-21 footballer playing in the European top divisions over a calendar year. Bellingham dislocated his left shoulder on 5 November, and returned to action against Cádiz three weeks later only because of an injury crisis at the club. Wearing heavy strapping, he assisted the first goal and scored the third of a 3–0 win, which took Madrid top of the table and his personal total to 14 from his first 15 games, breaking the club record held jointly by Pruden, Alfredo Di Stéfano and Cristiano Ronaldo. In a 4–2 victory against Napoli on 29 November, Bellingham became the first player to score in each of his first four Champions League appearances for Real Madrid.

Bellingham scored twice in a 4–0 win over La Liga title race rivals Girona on 10 February 2024. He was sent off for protesting at the end of Real Madrid's 2–2 draw with Valencia at the Mestalla on 2 March after what would have been his winning goal was denied because referee Jesús Gil Manzano had blown the whistle to end the game. He scored the winner in added time as Real Madrid won El Clásico 3–2 at home on 21 April; it was his 21st goal of the season, and made him Madrid's all-time top English scorer, overtaking Laurie Cunningham and David Beckham. The following day he was named as winner of the 2024 Laureus World Sports Award for Breakthrough of the Year. He concluded his domestic season as Real Madrid's top league scorer with 19 goals and 6 assists as they won the La Liga title, a performance that earned him the La Liga Player of the Season award. Facing his former club Borussia Dortmund in the Champions League final, Bellingham produced the assist for Vinícius Júnior to complete a 2–0 win. With four goals, five assists and a passing accuracy of 90.5%, Bellingham was named the UEFA Champions League Young Player of the Season. His performances were recognised with third-place finishes in both of that year's major polls, the Ballon d'Or and The Best FIFA Men's Player.

==== 2024–25: Second season and European Super Cup ====
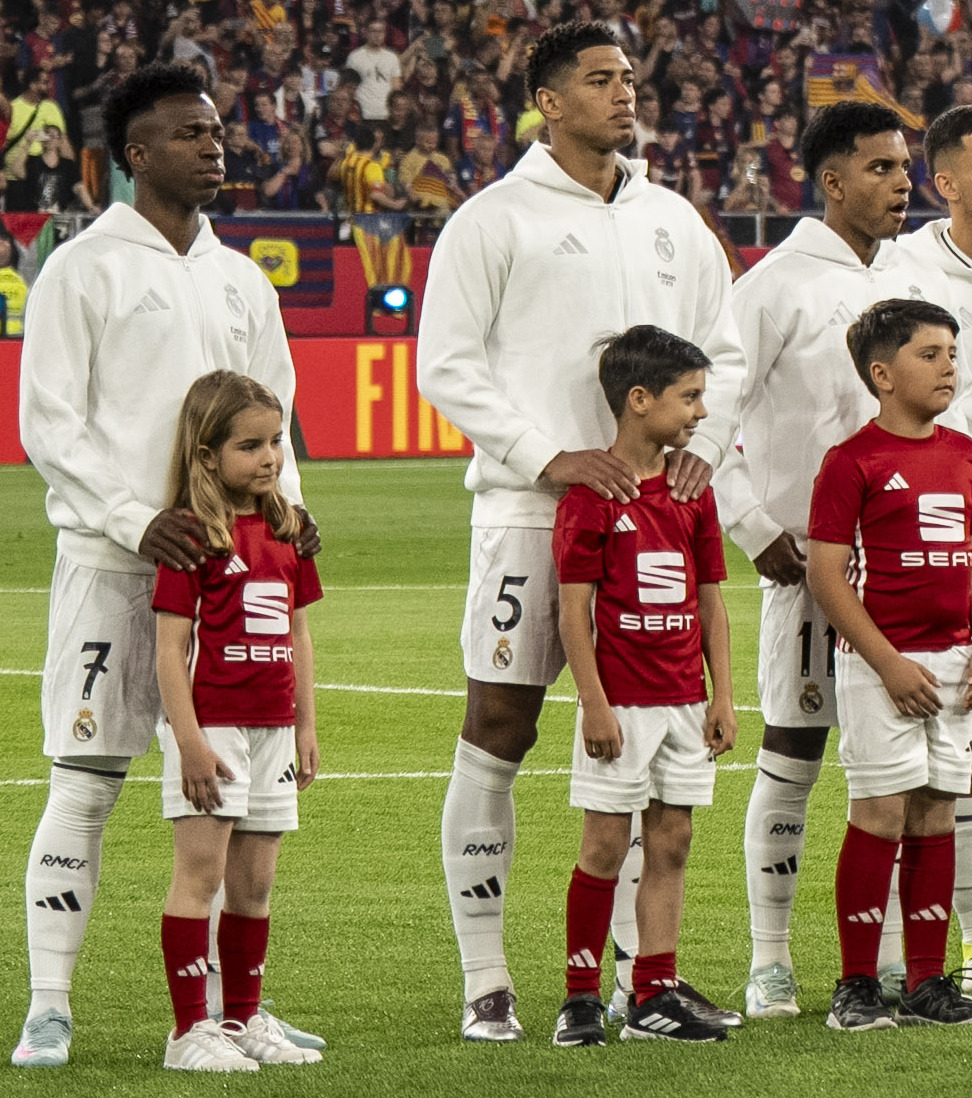
Vinícius Júnior, Bellingham and Rodrygo lining up for Real Madrid in the 2025 Copa del Rey final

On 14 August 2024, Bellingham started his second season in Spain, providing the assist for his new Real Madrid teammate Kylian Mbappé's debut goal, as Madrid defeated Atalanta 2–0 to win a record-breaking sixth European Super Cup. On 9 November, Bellingham scored his first goal of the season and first for Madrid since May 2024 in a dominant 4–0 home win over Osasuna. Over the next month, he scored league goals against Leganés, Getafe, Athletic Bilbao and Girona. On 14 December, Bellingham got on the scoresheet in a 3–3 draw at Rayo Vallecano, extending his scoring streak to six consecutive La Liga matches, becoming the first Real Madrid player to achieve the feat since Karim Benzema in 2016. Following this streak, he was named Player of the Month in La Liga for December. On 19 February 2025, Bellingham received a two-match suspension following his red card in Madrid's 1–1 draw with Osasuna. He was dismissed for dissent after protesting a refereeing decision, with the match official later reporting that Bellingham had used offensive language towards him. Manager Carlo Ancelotti stated that the referee, José Luis Munuera Montero, accused Bellingham of shouting "f*** you," whereas Bellingham claimed he had actually said "f*** off" in frustration rather than as a direct insult. Initially facing a potential 12-game ban under Spanish FA regulations, his suspension was reduced to two matches after the governing body ruled that his actions were "disrespectful/inconsiderate" rather than abusive.

==== 2025–26: Shoulder surgery ====
On 16 July 2025, Real Madrid confirmed that Bellingham had successfully undergone surgery to address a long-standing dislocation of his left shoulder, an issue he had battled since November 2023. According to reports, Bellingham was expected to be sidelined for approximately 10 to 12 weeks, missing the start of the 2025–26 La Liga season as well as the early stages of the UEFA Champions League group phase and aiming for an October return. However, Bellingham returned to action earlier, featuring in Madrid's 2–0 win over Espanyol on 20 September. On 22 October, he scored his first goal of the season, which turned out to be the winner in a 1–0 Champions League victory over Juventus. On 26 October, the following weekend, Bellingham scored his first La Liga goal of the season, which turned out to be the winner – his third match-winner against Barcelona in his Real Madrid career.

== International career ==
=== Youth career ===
Bellingham was eligible to play for his native England and also for the Republic of Ireland, for which he qualified via a grandparent. He made his England under-15 debut against Turkey in December 2016. In recognition of his captaining that team during the 2017–18 season, he was presented with a Special Achievement Award at the 2018 Birmingham City Academy awards night. By the end of 2018 he had made his first appearance for the England under-16 team, and went on to feature in eleven games, score four goals, and captain the team. He was included in England's under-17 squad for the Syrenka Cup, a friendly tournament held in September 2019 in preparation for the 2020 European Championship qualifiers the following March. He made his debut as a substitute in England's opening match of the tournament, a 5–0 win over Finland in which he scored the third goal, and captained the team in their second fixture, in which they came back from a goal behind to beat Austria 4–2 and qualify for the final. Again, Bellingham scored the third goal. He retained the captaincy for the final, in which England beat hosts Poland on penalties following a 2–2 draw, and was named player of the tournament.

Bellingham received his first call-up to the under-21 squad for European Championship qualifiers against Kosovo and Austria in September 2020. He became the youngest player to appear for England U21 when he came on to replace Tom Davies after 62 minutes of the match against Kosovo on 4 September with England 3–0 ahead, and scored after 85 minutes to complete the 6–0 victory.

=== Senior career ===
In November 2020, after James Ward-Prowse and Trent Alexander-Arnold withdrew through injury, Bellingham was called up to the England senior squad for the first time. He made his debut in a friendly match against the Republic of Ireland at Wembley on 12 November, replacing Mason Mount after 73 minutes of a 3–0 win. At 17 years, 136 days, he became England's third-youngest full international; only Theo Walcott and Wayne Rooney had appeared at a younger age.

==== UEFA Euro 2020 ====
Bellingham was named in the England squad for the UEFA Euro 2020 tournament, which was delayed until 2021 because of the COVID-19 pandemic. When he came on as an 82nd-minute substitute in England's opening match, a 1–0 win over Croatia at Wembley on 13 June, aged 17 years and 349 days, he became both the youngest Englishman to play at any major tournament and the youngest of any nationality to play at a European Championship; the latter record was broken by Poland's Kacper Kozłowski just six days later.

==== 2022 FIFA World Cup ====
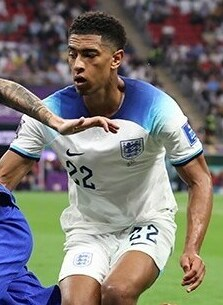
Bellingham playing for England at the 2022 FIFA World Cup

Bellingham scored his first senior international goal in England's 6–2 victory over Iran in their first game of the 2022 FIFA World Cup on 21 November. This made him the first person born in the 21st century to score in a World Cup, and the second youngest scorer for England at a World Cup, only behind Michael Owen. He also made the run and pass to Harry Kane who crossed for Raheem Sterling to score England's third goal, and played the through ball from which Callum Wilson set up their sixth for Jack Grealish. He followed this up during the last-16 game against Senegal with a run through the defence, assisting Jordan Henderson's goal in the 38th minute, and played a key role in Harry Kane's goal in first-half stoppage time, setting up Phil Foden to make the assist.

==== UEFA Euro 2024 ====
Bellingham was named in England's 26-man squad for UEFA Euro 2024. His powerful header from Bukayo Saka's deflected cross gave England a 1–0 victory against Serbia, and he was named player of the match.

He scored with a 95th-minute overhead kick in the round of 16 against Slovakia to tie the scores at 1–1 and take the match into extra time. England won 2–1, and Bellingham was again named player of the match. After scoring the equaliser, Bellingham gestured towards the opposing substitutes' bench by grabbing his crotch, claiming it was an inside joke aimed at "some close friends". After an investigation, UEFA found he had "violat[ed] the basic rules of decent conduct", fined him €30,000 and imposed a one-match ban suspended for 12 months.

Bellingham played the full 120 minutes of the quarter-final against Switzerland, and scored the second kick of the penalty shootout which England won 5–3. England reached the final, in which they faced Spain, who took the lead shortly after half-time. Bellingham touched Saka's pass to Cole Palmer who equalised after 73 minutes, but Spain scored a late winner and England ended the tournament as runners-up.

==== 2026 FIFA World Cup ====
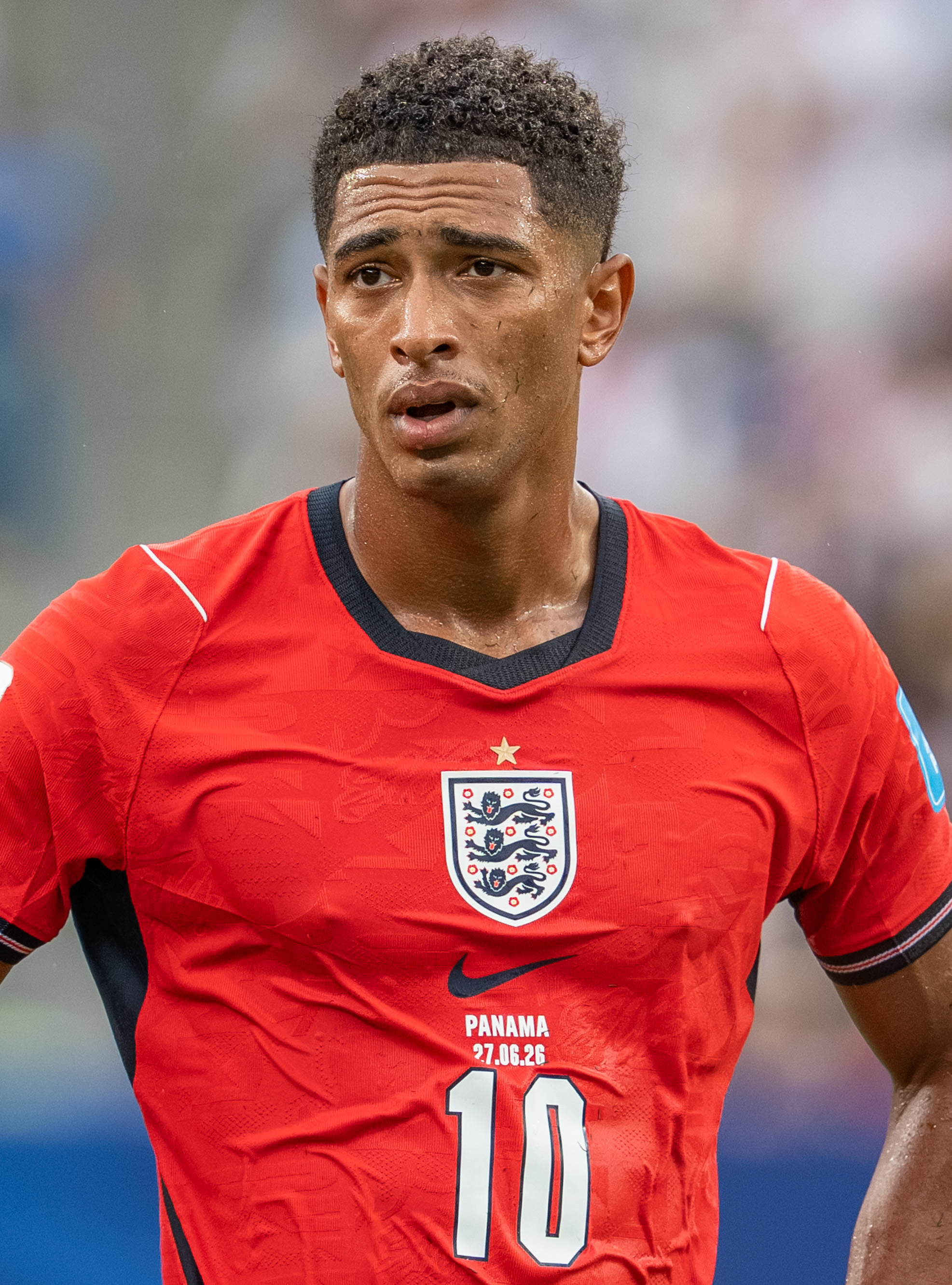
Bellingham playing for England at the 2026 FIFA World Cup

On 22 May 2026, Bellingham was selected in the 26-man squad for the 2026 FIFA World Cup, making him the youngest European player to feature at four different major men's tournaments. He scored in England's opening match, a 4–2 victory over Croatia. A week later, on 23 June, he reached his 50th international appearance for England in a goalless draw against Ghana, becoming the youngest player to achieve this milestone at 22 years and 359 days, surpassing the previous record held by Wayne Rooney. In England's final group match on 27 June, Bellingham scored a goal and set up another in a 2–0 win over Panama, in which England topped their group and advance to the knock-out stages of the tournament. In the round of 16 match against host nation Mexico, Bellingham scored twice within two minutes as England won 3–2 to advance to the quarter-finals. He was named Man of the Match and became the youngest player to feature in ten World Cup matches at 23 years and six days, breaking previous record held by Mario Kempes. In the quarter-final game against Norway, he was again named Man of the Match after scoring a brace in England's 2–1 victory after extra time. Hence, Bellingham became the fifth player to score multiple goals in consecutive World Cup knockout matches, after Sándor Kocsis, Pelé, Garrincha, and Diego Maradona. He also became the second-youngest player to score two or more goals in consecutive FIFA World Cup knockout matches, behind Pelé in 1958. On 18 July, during the third-place match against France, Bellingham scored in a 6–4 victory to bring his total to seven goals for the tournament, making his tally the outright most ever by an England player in a single World Cup edition. He was awarded the Bronze Boot as the third-highest scorer of the tournament.

== Player profile ==
=== Style of play ===
Known for his exceptional control of the ball, his physicality, and his technical quality, Bellingham is often regarded as one of the best and most well-rounded midfielders in the world. He is also known for his versatility and vision. He is praised for fulfilling multiple positions and his dynamic playing style, playing both exceptional defence and attack, described by The Analyst as a "do-it-all midfielder". His excellent runs and dribbling abilities have also earned him praise, as have his keen ability to quickly transition from defence to attack. An analysis by Andy Smith for the Bundesliga described Bellingham as "the complete package: a dynamic midfielder who can win the ball and drive it forward, hold up possession, resist the press, find gaps in opposition defences, plus assist and score goals". Bellingham has been described by Philipp Lahm as a "complete midfielder", who can "dribble, pass, shoot and has the urge to score", and who is "physical and fearless, holds his ground in challenges and wins the ball". Phil Foden described Bellingham as "one of the most gifted players I've ever seen". Paul Scholes also praised Bellingham in 2023, saying that "I think Jude Bellingham for his age and what he's accomplished so far in his short career, he's better than anything we've seen". He has been widely compared to the likes of Zinedine Zidane.

Following his move to Madrid in 2023, Bellingham took on a more advanced role in the midfield, often being positioned in the number 10 position as an attacking midfielder, or even as a false 9 or second striker on occasion. This change in position led to Bellingham adopting a more significant role in the final third and scoring goals: 10 in his first 10 matches for Madrid.

=== Reception ===
Bellingham's skill as a young player has enabled him to win several awards, including the IFFHS World's Best Youth (U20) Player in 2022 and 2023, and the Golden Boy award and Kopa Trophy in 2023. ESPN rated Bellingham as the number one central midfielder for 2022–23, and 90min rated him as the top central midfielder in 2022.

== Outside football ==
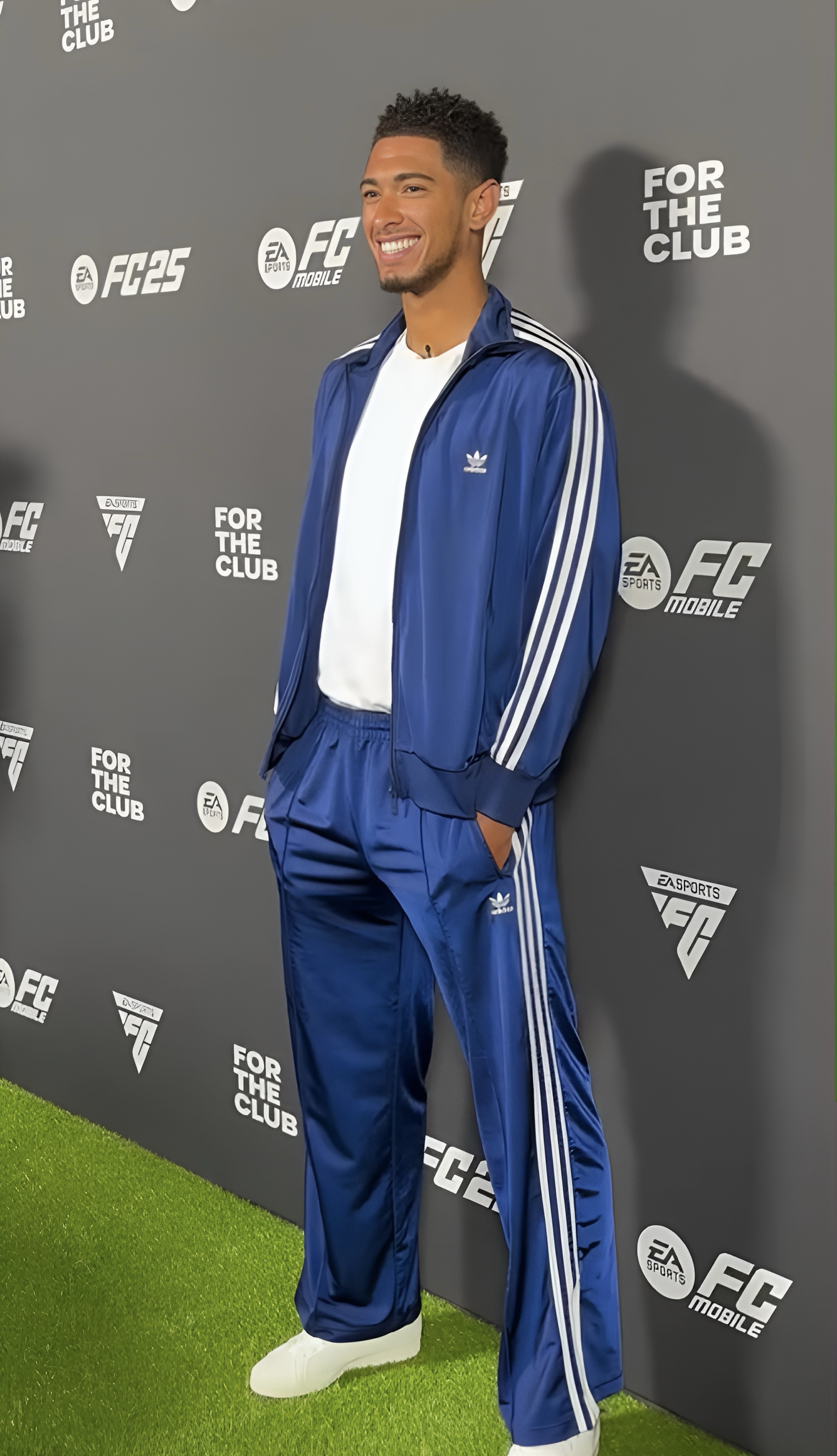
Bellingham during the EA Sports FC 25 launch event in September 2024

In May 2024, Bellingham signed a multi-year deal with the sports drink, Lucozade, becoming the face of the brand's multi-million pound TV campaign. In June 2024, he appeared in Kim Kardashian's shapewear and clothing brand Skims' campaign; the photoshoot featured Bellingham modelling men's underwear. In July 2024, he was revealed as the cover star for the video game EA Sports FC 25. In the same month, Adidas launched Bellingham's first signature collection, featuring a jersey, tracksuit, ringer tee, and shorts, all adorned with the JB monogram logo. In August 2024, Louis Vuitton named him a "Friend of the House," announcing their partnership. In September 2024. Bellingham started his official channel on YouTube with a behind-the-scenes documentary about his first year in Spain. In December 2024, he appeared in Adidas' documentary film Under the Tongue.

In July 2025, Bellingham was revealed as one of the cover stars for EA Sports FC 26, along with Jamal Musiala and Zlatan Ibrahimović, for the second time. In September 2025, he was announced as a Laureus ambassador. In November 2025, Bellingham launched his own app, "JB5". In April 2026, he bought a minority stake in Birmingham Phoenix. In November 2026, he had a campaign with Calvin Klein underwear.

== Personal life ==
Since 2025, Bellingham has been in a relationship with Ashlyn Castro, an American social media influencer.

== Career statistics ==
=== Club ===
As of match played 21 November 2026

Appearances and goals by club, season and competition
| Club | Season | League | | | National cup (Note: Includes FA Cup, DFB-Pokal, Copa del Rey) | | League cup (Note: Includes EFL Cup) | | Europe | | Other | | Total | |
| Club | Season | Division | Apps | Goals | Apps | Goals | Apps | Goals | Apps | Goals | Apps | Goals | Apps | Goals |
|---|---|---|---|---|---|---|---|---|---|---|---|---|---|---|
| Birmingham City | 2019–20 | Championship | 41 | 4 | 2 | 0 | 1 | 0 | — | | — | | 44 | 4 |
| Borussia Dortmund | 2020–21 | Bundesliga | 29 | 1 | 6 | 2 | — | | 10 (Note: Appearances in UEFA Champions League) | 1 | 1 (Note: Appearance in DFL-Supercup) | 0 | 46 | 4 |
| Borussia Dortmund | 2021–22 | Bundesliga | 32 | 3 | 3 | 0 | — | | 8 (Note: Six appearances and one goal in UEFA Champions League, two appearances and two goals in UEFA Europa League) | 3 | 1 | 0 | 44 | 6 |
| Borussia Dortmund | 2022–23 | Bundesliga | 31 | 8 | 4 | 2 | — | | 7 | 4 | — | | 42 | 14 |
| Borussia Dortmund | Total | | 92 | 12 | 13 | 4 | — | | 25 | 8 | 2 | 0 | 132 | 24 |
| Real Madrid | 2023–24 | La Liga | 28 | 19 | 1 | 0 | — | | 11 | 4 | 2 (Note: Appearances in Supercopa de España) | 0 | 42 | 23 |
| Real Madrid | 2024–25 | La Liga | 31 | 9 | 4 | 1 | — | | 13 | 3 | 10 (Note: One appearance in UEFA Super Cup, one appearance in FIFA Intercontinental Cup, two appearances and one goal in Supercopa de España, six appearances and one goal in FIFA Club World Cup) | 2 | 58 | 15 |
| Real Madrid | 2025–26 | La Liga | 28 | 6 | 1 | 0 | — | | 9 | 2 | 2 | 0 | 40 | 8 |
| Real Madrid | 2026–27 | La Liga | 13 | 5 | 0 | 0 | — | | 4 | 1 | 0 | 0 | 17 | 6 |
| Real Madrid | Total | | 100 | 39 | 6 | 1 | — | | 37 | 10 | 14 | 2 | 157 | 52 |
| Career total | | | 233 | 55 | 21 | 5 | 1 | 0 | 62 | 18 | 16 | 2 | 333 | 80 |

=== International ===
As of match played 15 November 2026

Appearances and goals by national team and year
| National team | Year | Apps | Goals |
|---|---|---|---|
| England | 2020 | 1 | 0 |
| England | 2021 | 9 | 0 |
| England | 2022 | 12 | 1 |
| England | 2023 | 5 | 1 |
| England | 2024 | 13 | 4 |
| England | 2025 | 6 | 0 |
| England | 2026 | 16 | 8 |
| Total | | 62 | 14 |

As of match played 3 October 2026
England score listed first, score column indicates score after each Bellingham goal

List of international goals scored by Jude Bellingham
| No. | Date | Venue | Cap | Opponent | Score | Result | Competition | Ref. |
|---|---|---|---|---|---|---|---|---|
| 1 | 21 November 2022 | Khalifa International Stadium, Al Rayyan, Qatar | 18 | Iran | 1–0 | 6–2 | 2022 FIFA World Cup | |
| 2 | 12 September 2023 | Hampden Park, Glasgow, Scotland | 26 | Scotland | 2–0 | 3–1 | Friendly | |
| 3 | 26 March 2024 | Wembley Stadium, London, England | 29 | Belgium | 2–2 | 2–2 | Friendly | |
| 4 | 16 June 2024 | Arena AufSchalke, Gelsenkirchen, Germany | 30 | Serbia | 1–0 | 1–0 | UEFA Euro 2024 | |
| 5 | 30 June 2024 | Arena AufSchalke, Gelsenkirchen, Germany | 33 | Slovakia | 1–1 | 2–1 (a.e.t.) | UEFA Euro 2024 | |
| 6 | 10 October 2024 | Wembley Stadium, London, England | 37 | Greece | 1–1 | 1–2 | 2024–25 UEFA Nations League B | |
| 7 | 17 June 2026 | AT&T Stadium, Arlington, United States | 49 | Croatia | 3–2 | 4–2 | 2026 FIFA World Cup | |
| 8 | 27 June 2026 | MetLife Stadium, East Rutherford, United States | 51 | Panama | 1–0 | 2–0 | 2026 FIFA World Cup | |
| 9 | 5 July 2026 | Estadio Azteca, Mexico City, Mexico | 53 | Mexico | 1–0 | 3–2 | 2026 FIFA World Cup | |
| 10 | 5 July 2026 | Estadio Azteca, Mexico City, Mexico | 53 | Mexico | 2–0 | 3–2 | 2026 FIFA World Cup | |
| 11 | 11 July 2026 | Hard Rock Stadium, Miami Gardens, United States | 54 | Norway | 1–1 | 2–1 (a.e.t.) | 2026 FIFA World Cup | |
| 12 | 11 July 2026 | Hard Rock Stadium, Miami Gardens, United States | 54 | Norway | 2–1 | 2–1 (a.e.t.) | 2026 FIFA World Cup | |
| 13 | 18 July 2026 | Hard Rock Stadium, Miami Gardens, United States | 56 | France | 6–4 | 6–4 | 2026 FIFA World Cup | |
| 14 | 3 October 2026 | Stadion Rujevica, Rijeka, Croatia | 59 | Croatia | 2–0 | 7–0 | 2026–27 UEFA Nations League A | |

== Honours ==
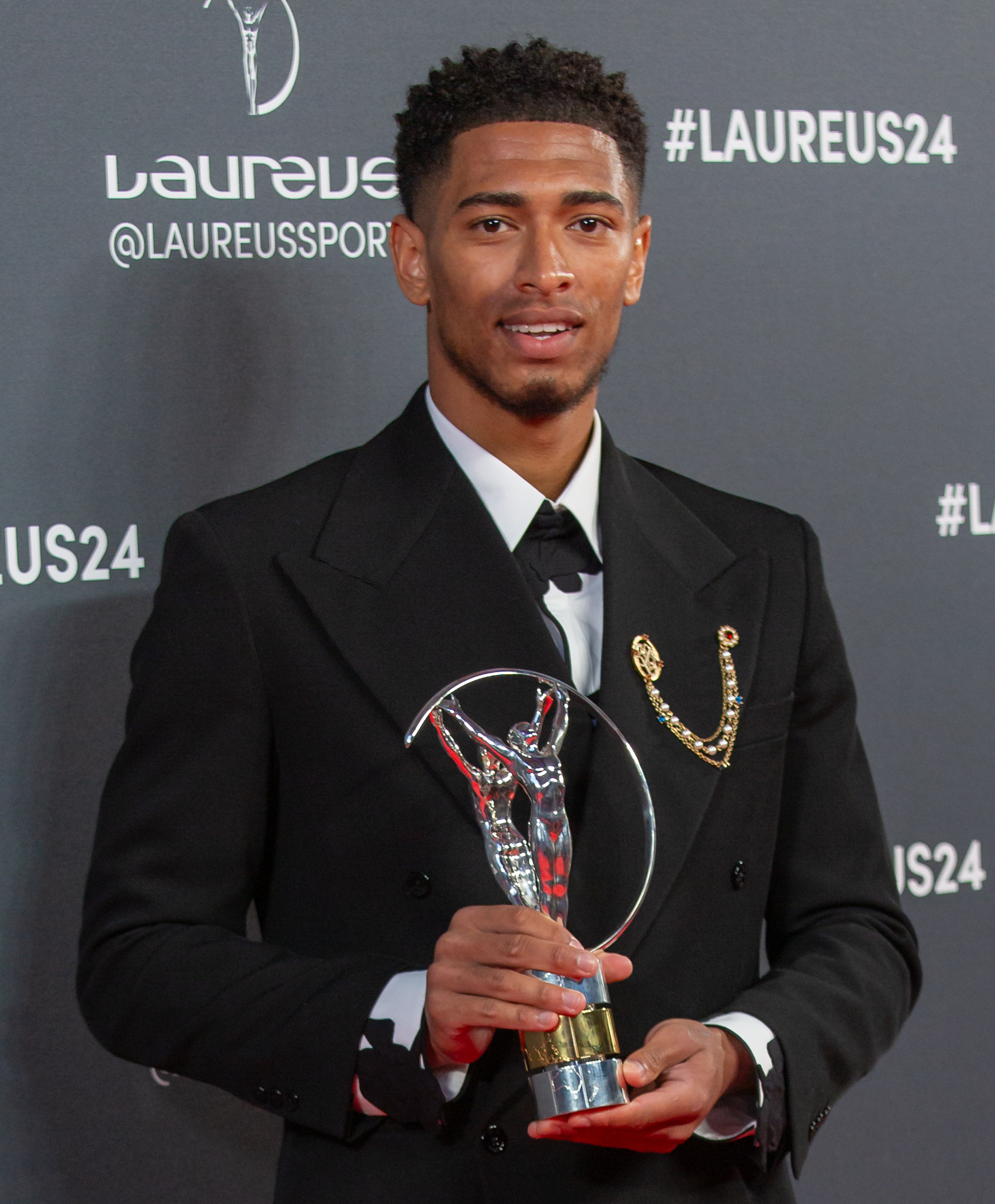
Bellingham with the 2024 Laureus World Sports Award for Breakthrough of the Year

Borussia Dortmund

- DFB-Pokal: 2020–21

Real Madrid

- La Liga: 2023–24
- Supercopa de España: 2024
- UEFA Champions League: 2023–24
- UEFA Super Cup: 2024
- FIFA Intercontinental Cup: 2024

England U17

- Syrenka Cup: 2019

England

- UEFA European Championship runner-up: 2020, 2024
- FIFA World Cup third place: 2026

Individual

- England Men's Player of the Year: 2024–25
- Birmingham City Under-15/16 Goal of the Season: 2018
- Birmingham City Special Achievement Award: 2018
- Syrenka Cup Player of the Tournament: 2019
- EFL Young Player of the Month: November 2019
- Birmingham City Young Player of the Year: 2019–20
- EFL Young Player of the Season: 2019–20
- Championship Apprentice of the Year: 2019–20
- Bundesliga Rookie of the Month: September 2020
- Bundesliga Goal of the Month: October 2021
- Bundesliga Team of the Season: 2021–22, 2022–23
- VDV Bundesliga Newcomer of the Season: 2020–21
- VDV Bundesliga Team of the Season: 2021–22, 2022–23
- Kopa Trophy: 2023; runner-up: 2021
- Goal NXGN: 2022
- IFFHS Men's Youth (U20) World Team: 2021, 2022, 2023
- IFFHS Men's World's Best Youth Player: 2022, 2023
- IFFHS Men's World Team: 2023, 2024
- IFFHS World's Best Playmaker: 2024
- ESPN Midfielder of the Year: 2022–23
- Bundesliga Player of the Season: 2022–23
- VDV Bundesliga Player of the Season: 2022–23
- Golden Boy: 2023
- Globe Soccer Awards Emerging Player of the Year: 2023
- Globe Soccer Awards Midfielder of the Year: 2024
- Globe Soccer Awards Maradona Award: 2024
- FIFPRO World 11: 2023, 2024, 2025, 2026
- FIFA Men's World 11: 2024, 2025
- La Liga Player of the Month: August 2023, October 2023, December 2024
- La Liga U23 Player of the Month: January 2025
- La Liga Player of the Season: 2023–24
- La Liga Team of the Season: 2023–24, 2024–25
- UEFA Champions League Team of the Season: 2023–24
- UEFA Champions League Young Player of the Season: 2023–24
- Laureus World Breakthrough of the Year: 2024
- ESM Team of the Year: 2023–24
- FIFA World Cup Bronze Boot: 2026
- FIFA World Cup Dream XI: 2026

== See also ==
- List of FIFA World Cup top goalscorers
