= Edmonton Borough F.C. =

Edmonton Borough
- Full name: Edmonton Borough Football Club
- Founded: 1947
- Dissolved: 1950
- Ground: Henry Barrass Stadium, Edmonton
- Final season; 1949–50: London League Premier Division, 13th of 16
Home colours

Edmonton Borough Football Club was a football club based in Edmonton, England.

== History ==
Edmonton Borough were formed in 1947, playing their first game against Chelsea reserves in a 7–4 friendly loss. Upon formation, Edmonton joined the London League Premier Division. In Edmonton's first season, they entered the FA Cup for the first time, reaching the preliminary round. In 1950, Edmonton Borough merged with Tufnell Park to form Tufnell Park Edmonton.

== Colours ==
The club played in blue shirts and black shorts.

== Ground ==
Edmonton Borough played at the Henry Barrass Stadium in Edmonton.

== Records ==
- Best FA Cup performance: Preliminary round, 1947–48
