= City of Westminster F.C. =

Football club in England

City of Westminster
- Full name: City of Westminster Football Club
- Dissolved: 1914
Home colours

City of Westminster Football Club was a football club based in Westminster, England.

== History ==
During the 1904–05 season, City of Westminster joined the London League, finishing bottom of the First Division in their only season in the league. Following their spell in the London League, the club joined the Southern Suburban League, entering the FA Cup seven times, before the team folded after the outbreak of World War I. The club also entered the FA Amateur Cup during their existence.

== Records ==
- Best FA Cup performance: First qualifying round, 1905–06, 1910–11
