= Dagenham Town F.C. =

Dagenham Town
- Full name: Dagenham Town Football Club
- Founded: 1929
- Dissolved: 1940
- Ground: Glebe Road, Dagenham
- President: Coninsby Hammett
Home colours

Dagenham Town Football Club was a football club based in Dagenham, England.

== History ==
Dagenham Town were formed in 1929, after West Ham & District Thursday League club Lombardians were renamed at their 1929 AGM. Dagenham joined the London League, also entering the FA Cup for the first time in the 1929–30 season, taking Welsh club Barry to a replay in the first round, losing 1–0 at West Ham United's Boleyn Ground. Dagenham Town would enter the FA Cup on two more occasions, in 1931 and 1939. Following the outbreak of World War II, Dagenham were playing in the South Essex Combination. The club never re-appeared following the war, with former directors of the club forming Dagenham British Legion in 1946.

== Colours ==
The club initially played in claret and amber, but, in 1937, as women supporters of the club claimed that the shirts were unlucky, the club bought a new set of red and white jerseys, using the claret and amber as a change kit.

== Ground ==
The club initially played at the Leytonstone's High Road ground, before moving to Glebe Road in Dagenham.

== Records ==
- Best FA Cup performance: First round, 1929–30
