= London Telephone Region =

The London Telephone Region was an administrative unit of Post Office Telephones in Britain formed in 1936. It comprised all of the London Telephone Area (the area covered by the 01 telephone area code at the time) plus the charging groups adjacent, for example: the Romford Charge Group, comprising Hornchurch, Ingrebourne, Purfleet, Rainham, Romford, South Ockendon, Stapleford and Upminster telephone exchange areas.

The LTR was divided into Areas, such as East and North. East area included the Romford charging group, as above, plus the east sector of the London Telephone Area.
