= Edmonton F.C. (England) =

Edmonton
- Full name: Edmonton Football Club
- Founded: 1950
- Dissolved: 1973
- Ground: Barrass Stadium, Edmonton

Edmonton Football Club was a football club based in Edmonton, London, England. Formed in 1950 by a merger of Tufnell Park and Edmonton Borough, they merged with Haringey Borough in 1973 to form Edmonton & Haringey.

== History ==
The club was established in 1950 as a merger of Tufnell Park and Edmonton Borough (who had been groundsharing at Edmonton's Barrass Stadium since shortly after World War II) and was initially named Tufnell Park Edmonton. The new club took Tufnell Park's place in the Isthmian League; Tufnell Park had finished bottom of the table for the two previous seasons, and the merged club finished bottom of the league for the next two seasons. After failing to be re-elected at the end of the 1951–52 season, they joined the Spartan League in 1952. After two mid-table finishes, they left the Spartan League to join the Delphian League.

In 1960 the club was renamed Edmonton. When the Delphian League's normal format was abandoned during the weather-hit 1962–63 season, the club won the hastily arranged Western Section. They then won the league title by beating Eastern Section champions Hertford Town 5–2 on aggregate in the two-legged championship play-off. The league was disbanded at the end of the season, and like most of the other Delphian League clubs, Edmonton became members of the new Division Two of the Athenian League. They won the Division Two Cup in 1967–68 and 1968–69, and in 1969–70 the club were Division Two runners-up, earning promotion to Division One.

In 1973 Edmonton merged with Haringey Borough in 1973 to form Edmonton & Haringey, with the new club taking Edmonton's place in the Athenian League but playing at Haringey Borough's Coles Park.

== Honours ==
- Athenian League
  - Division Two Cup winners 1967–68, 1968–69
- Delphian League
  - Champions 1962–63
  - Western Division champions 1962–63

== Records ==
- Best FA Cup performance: Third qualifying round, 1953–54, 1968–69, 1969–70
