= Catholic United F.C. =

Association football club in England

Coordinates: 51°33′57.19″N 0°40′34.68″E

Catholic United
- Full name: Catholic United Football Club
- Founded: 1959; 67 years ago
- Ground: Len Forge Centre, Southend-on-Sea
- Chairman: Tom Harding
- Manager: Eamonn Kearney
- League: Essex Olympian League Premier Division
- 2025–26: Essex Olympian League Premier Division, 1st of 16 (Champions)
Home colours	Away colours

Catholic United Football Club is a football club based in Southend-on-Sea, Essex, England. Representing the Catholic community in Southend-on-Sea, they are currently members of the Essex Olympian League Premier Division and play at the Len Forge Centre.

== History ==
Prior to Catholic United forming in 1959, Southend Catholic and Catholic Athletic represented the Catholic community in Southend-on-Sea. In 1968, Catholic United adopted green and white hoops after requesting a set of kits from Scottish club Celtic. Ahead of the 2009–10 season, the club joined the Essex Olympian League from the Southend Borough Combination. Between 2014–15 and 2016–17, Catholic United achieved three consecutive promotions in the Essex Olympian League system, winning the Premier Division in their debut season in 2017–18. Catholic United entered the FA Vase for the first time in 2019–20.

== Ground ==
In 2020, after groundsharing with Bowers & Pitsea at the Len Salmon Stadium, Catholic United moved to the Len Forge Centre, at Eastwoodbury Lane in Southend-on-Sea. Prior to this, the club played their home games at Wellstead Gardens, Westcliff on Sea.

== Honours ==
Type	Competition	Titles	Seasons
Regional	Essex Olympian League Premier Division	2	2017-18, 2025-26
Regional	Southend Borough Combination League Premier Division	2	1968-69, 1969-70
Regional	The Pete Simmonds Trophy	4^{S}	1989–90, 90–91, 91–92, 93–94

=== Other Titles ===
- Essex Olympian League
  - Division Three Champions 2014–15
  - Division Two Champions 2015–16
  - Division One runners-up 2016–17
- Southend Borough Combination League
  - Division One Champions 1964–65
  - Division Two Champions 1927-28 (as Catholic Athletic), 70–71
  - Division Three Champions 1962–63, 68–69
- Cups and other trophies
  - Anagram Records Trophy Winners 2017–18, 18–19
  - Essex Olympian Senior League Cup Winners 2022–23
  - Frank Walton Cup Winners 1966–67, 67–68
  - EJ Gladwin Memorial Cup Winners 1970–71, 71–72, 72–73
  - The Chautard Cup Winners 1999–00
  - The Ken Cater Cup Winners 1986–87
  - John Mitchell Cup Winners 1928-29 (as Catholic Athletic)

== Records ==
- Best FA Vase performance: Second qualifying round, 2019–20

== See also ==
- Celtic FC
- San Lorenzo de Almagro
- Derry City FC
- Belfast Celtic FC
- St. Patrick's C.Y.F.C.
- Club Deportivo Universidad Católica
- Hibernian FC
