= 1988–89 Essex Senior Football League =

The 1988–89 season was the 18th in the history of Essex Senior Football League, a football competition in England.

The league featured 15 clubs which competed in the league last season, along with two new clubs:

- Southend Manor, joined from the Reserve division
- Stambridge

Brightlingsea United were champions, winning their first Essex Senior League title.

== League table ==
Essex Senior Football League
- Season: 1988–89
- Champions: Brightlingsea United
- Matches: 272
- Goals: 828 (3.04 per match)

Pos	Team	Pld	W	D	L	GF	GA	GD	Pts	Promotion or relegation
1	Brightlingsea United	32	21	5	6	68	28	+40	68	
2	East Thurrock United	32	19	8	5	70	38	+32	65	
3	Ford United	32	18	7	7	56	31	+25	61	
4	Burnham Ramblers	32	17	8	7	65	43	+22	59	
5	Stansted	32	15	5	12	53	52	+1	50	
6	Canvey Island	32	14	7	11	62	52	+10	49	
7	Southend Manor	32	13	10	9	46	39	+7	49	
8	Eton Manor	32	12	9	11	46	43	+3	45	
9	Brentwood	32	12	8	12	45	52	−7	44	
10	Woodford Town	32	12	7	13	40	37	+3	43	
11	Sawbridgeworth Town	32	11	7	14	43	43	0	40	
12	Stambridge	32	10	8	14	45	56	−11	38	
13	Chelmsford City reserves	32	7	11	14	41	55	−14	32	
14	Coggeshall Town	32	8	8	16	42	57	−15	32	Resigned from the league
15	Bowers United	32	7	10	15	36	55	−19	31	
16	East Ham United	32	7	7	18	42	75	−33	28	
17	Maldon Town	32	3	7	22	28	72	−44	16	

Source: fchd
Rules for classification: 1) points; 2) goal difference; 3) number of goals scored.
