= 1981–82 Essex Senior Football League =

The 1981–82 season was the eleventh in the history of Essex Senior Football League, a football competition in England.

The league featured 17 clubs which competed in the league last season, no new clubs joined the league this season.

Heybridge Swifts were champions, winning their first Essex Senior League title.

== League table ==
Essex Senior Football League
- Season: 1981–82
- Champions: Heybridge Swifts
- Matches: 272
- Goals: 758 (2.79 per match)

Pos	Team	Pld	W	D	L	GF	GA	GD	Pts
1	Heybridge Swifts	32	26	4	2	74	21	+53	56
2	Wivenhoe Town	32	20	4	8	66	35	+31	44
3	Brentwood	32	19	5	8	61	32	+29	43
4	Bowers United	32	16	8	8	56	33	+23	40
5	Witham Town	32	16	6	10	49	27	+22	38
6	Canvey Island	32	15	7	10	42	38	+4	37
7	Sawbridgeworth Town	32	16	4	12	55	35	+20	36
8	Stansted	32	12	9	11	42	41	+1	33
9	Brightlingsea United	32	12	9	11	34	44	−10	33
10	Halstead Town	32	13	4	15	52	49	+3	30
11	Chelmsford City reserves	32	8	10	14	36	53	−17	26
12	Coggeshall Town	32	9	8	15	39	57	−18	26
13	Ford United	32	11	3	18	36	70	−34	25
14	East Thurrock United	32	6	10	16	25	47	−22	22
15	Maldon Town	32	6	9	17	36	59	−23	21
16	Eton Manor	32	7	7	18	26	60	−34	20 (Note: Eton Manor were deducted one point.)
17	East Ham United	32	3	7	22	29	57	−28	13

Source: fchd
Rules for classification: 1) points; 2) goal difference; 3) number of goals scored.
