= 1980–81 Essex Senior Football League =

The 1980–81 season was the tenth in the history of Essex Senior Football League, a football competition in England.

The league featured 15 clubs which competed in the league last season, along with two new clubs:

- Chelmsford City reserves
- Halstead Town, joined from the Essex and Suffolk Border League

Bowers & Pitsea were champions, winning their first Essex Senior League title.

== League table ==
Essex Senior Football League
- Season: 1980–81
- Champions: Bowers United
- Matches: 272
- Goals: 807 (2.97 per match)

Pos	Team	Pld	W	D	L	GF	GA	GD	Pts
1	Bowers United	32	22	8	2	73	31	+42	52
2	Heybridge Swifts	32	20	7	5	69	27	+42	47
3	Wivenhoe Town	32	20	5	7	67	34	+33	45
4	Canvey Island	32	14	13	5	53	35	+18	41
5	Witham Town	32	13	12	7	54	30	+24	38
6	Brentwood	32	15	7	10	52	43	+9	37
7	Maldon Town	32	13	7	12	48	47	+1	33
8	Sawbridgeworth Town	32	10	11	11	45	41	+4	31
9	Stansted	32	10	10	12	43	46	−3	30
10	Ford United	32	10	10	12	47	55	−8	30
11	East Ham United	32	8	11	13	33	48	−15	27
12	East Thurrock United	32	9	9	14	34	50	−16	27
13	Brightlingsea United	32	10	4	18	33	52	−19	24
14	Coggeshall Town	32	9	5	18	44	71	−27	23
15	Chelmsford City reserves	32	7	8	17	38	59	−21	22
16	Halstead Town	32	6	7	19	42	82	−40	19
17	Eton Manor	32	6	6	20	32	56	−24	18

Source: fchd
Rules for classification: 1) points; 2) goal difference; 3) number of goals scored.
