= 1977–78 Essex Senior Football League =

The 1977–78 season was the seventh in the history of Essex Senior Football League, a football competition in England.

The league featured 16 clubs which competed in the league last season, no new clubs joined the league this season.

Basildon United were champions, winning their second Essex Senior League title in a row.

== League table ==
Essex Senior Football League
- Season: 1977–78
- Champions: Basildon United
- Matches played: 240
- Goals scored: 700 (2.92 per match)

Pos	Team	Pld	W	D	L	GF	GA	GD	Pts
1	Basildon United	30	25	4	1	71	15	+56	54
2	Tiptree United	30	22	5	3	82	29	+53	49
3	Ford United	30	15	9	6	47	29	+18	39
4	Brentwood	30	14	8	8	50	38	+12	36
5	Witham Town	30	15	6	9	36	33	+3	36
6	Canvey Island	30	14	6	10	43	34	+9	34
7	Heybridge Swifts	30	13	7	10	40	32	+8	33
8	Bowers United	30	10	10	10	37	40	−3	30
9	Eton Manor	30	13	3	14	44	42	+2	29
10	Woodford Town	30	9	9	12	40	48	−8	27
11	Brightlingsea United	30	10	4	16	47	50	−3	24
12	Stansted	30	6	8	16	36	63	−27	20
13	Chelmsford City reserves	30	7	5	18	39	64	−25	19
14	Coggeshall Town	30	7	4	19	30	64	−34	18
15	Maldon Town	30	6	5	19	29	56	−27	17
16	Sawbridgeworth Town	30	5	5	20	29	63	−34	15

Source: fchd
Rules for classification: 1) points; 2) goal difference; 3) number of goals scored.
