= 1982–83 Essex Senior Football League =

The 1982–83 season was the twelfth in the history of Essex Senior Football League, a football competition in England.

The league featured 17 clubs which competed in the league last season, no new clubs joined the league this season.

Heybridge Swifts were champions, winning their second Essex Senior League title in a row.

== League table ==
Essex Senior Football League
- Season: 1982–83
- Champions: Heybridge Swifts
- Matches: 271
- Goals: 907 (3.35 per match)

Pos	Team	Pld	W	D	L	GF	GA	GD	Pts
1	Heybridge Swifts	32	25	3	4	90	21	+69	53
2	Stansted	32	22	7	3	64	30	+34	51
3	Halstead Town	32	24	2	6	87	32	+55	50
4	Bowers United	32	19	4	9	76	40	+36	42
5	Canvey Island	31	17	7	7	61	39	+22	41 (Note: Match between Canvey Island and Eton Manor was left unplayed.)
6	Witham Town	32	15	9	8	54	36	+18	39
7	Wivenhoe Town	32	12	9	11	48	50	−2	33
8	Chelmsford City reserves	32	10	9	13	41	53	−12	29
9	Coggeshall Town	32	12	3	17	49	71	−22	27
10	Maldon Town	32	8	9	15	54	74	−20	25
11	Brentwood	32	9	7	16	37	57	−20	25
12	Ford United	32	10	4	18	47	58	−11	24
13	Sawbridgeworth Town	32	8	8	16	51	65	−14	24
14	Brightlingsea United	32	9	6	17	38	56	−18	24
15	East Ham United	32	6	7	19	48	84	−36	19
16	Eton Manor	31	7	5	19	33	75	−42	19
17	East Thurrock United	32	4	9	19	29	66	−37	17

Source: fchd
Rules for classification: 1) points; 2) goal difference; 3) number of goals scored.
