= 1997–98 Essex Senior Football League =

The 1997–98 season was the 27th in the history of Essex Senior Football League a football competition in England.

The league featured 14 clubs which competed in the league last season, no new clubs joined the league this season.

Concord Rangers were champions, winning their first Essex Senior League title.

== League table ==
Essex Senior Football League
- Season: 1997–98
- Champions: Concord Rangers
- Matches: 182
- Goals: 650 (3.57 per match)

Pos	Team	Pld	W	D	L	GF	GA	GD	Pts
1	Concord Rangers	26	23	2	1	74	20	+54	71
2	Basildon United	26	22	3	1	75	15	+60	69
3	Bowers United	26	19	2	5	65	25	+40	59
4	Stansted	26	15	3	8	71	43	+28	48
5	Burnham Ramblers	26	13	5	8	52	33	+19	44
6	Hullbridge Sports	26	11	5	10	44	37	+7	38
7	Great Wakering Rovers	26	10	5	11	39	42	−3	35
8	Brentwood	26	9	4	13	34	44	−10	31
9	East Ham United	26	9	3	14	41	61	−20	30
10	Sawbridgeworth Town	26	8	3	15	32	57	−25	27
11	Ilford	26	7	5	14	38	48	−10	26
12	Southend Manor	26	4	6	16	27	66	−39	18
13	Eton Manor	26	3	4	19	34	59	−25	13
14	Saffron Walden Town	26	3	2	21	24	100	−76	11

Source: fchd
Rules for classification: 1) points; 2) goal difference; 3) number of goals scored.
