= 2010–11 Essex Senior Football League =

The 2010–11 season was the 40th in the history of Essex Senior Football League a football competition in England.

The league featured 17 clubs which competed in the league last season, no new clubs joined the league this season.

Enfield 1893 were champions, winning their first Essex Senior League title, but were not promoted due to ground grading requirements.

== League table ==
Essex Senior Football League
- Season: 2010–11
- Champions: Enfield 1893
- Matches: 272
- Goals: 929 (3.42 per match)

Pos	Team	Pld	W	D	L	GF	GA	GD	Pts
1	Enfield 1893	32	23	4	5	83	27	+56	73
2	Stansted	32	22	9	1	81	25	+56	72 (Note: Stansted were deducted three points.)
3	Witham Town	32	20	8	4	82	40	+42	67 (Note: Witham Town were deducted one point.)
4	Bethnal Green United	32	17	6	9	59	35	+24	57
5	Southend Manor	32	16	5	11	58	47	+11	53
6	Barking	32	15	4	13	52	44	+8	49
7	Burnham Ramblers	32	14	6	12	67	50	+17	48
8	Eton Manor	32	11	10	11	59	56	+3	43
9	Hullbridge Sports	32	10	10	12	48	53	−5	40
10	London APSA	32	12	4	16	27	42	−15	40
11	Mauritius Sports	32	11	5	16	53	62	−9	38
12	Basildon United	32	10	4	18	45	66	−21	34
13	Takeley	32	9	7	16	48	73	−25	34
14	Bowers & Pitsea	32	8	8	16	41	72	−31	32
15	Barkingside	32	9	4	19	51	78	−27	31
16	Sawbridgeworth Town	32	10	1	21	38	75	−37	31
17	Clapton	32	3	9	20	37	84	−47	18

Source: fchd
Rules for classification: 1) points; 2) goal difference; 3) number of goals scored.
