= 1974–75 Essex Senior Football League =

The 1974–75 season was the fourth in the history of Essex Senior Football League, a football competition in England.

The league featured nine clubs which competed in the league last season, along with six new clubs:

- Bowers United, joined from the Essex Olympian League
- Brentwood Athletic, joined from the Essex Olympian League, renaming themselves Brentwood
- Colchester United 'A'
- Ford United, joined from the Metropolitan–London League
- Romford reserves
- Southend United 'A'

Billericay Town were champions, winning their second Essex Senior League title.

== League table ==
Essex Senior Football League
- Season: 1974–75
- Champions: Billericay Town
- Matches played: 210
- Goals scored: 638 (3.04 per match)

Pos	Team	Pld	W	D	L	GF	GA	GD	Pts	Promotion or relegation
1	Billericay Town	28	21	3	4	63	16	+47	45	
2	Basildon United	28	17	5	6	54	24	+30	39	
3	Coggeshall Town	28	14	9	5	49	29	+20	37	
4	Colchester United 'A'	28	14	8	6	57	42	+15	36	Resigned from the league
5	Bowers United	28	14	6	8	49	28	+21	34	
6	Witham Town	28	15	4	9	55	39	+16	34	
7	Tiptree United	28	13	4	11	43	50	−7	30	
8	Romford reserves	28	10	6	12	55	53	+2	26	Resigned from the league
9	Maldon Town	28	8	9	11	31	39	−8	25	
10	Southend United 'A'	28	9	5	14	32	35	−3	23	
11	Ford United	28	8	7	13	31	36	−5	23	
12	Brentwood	28	7	8	13	32	52	−20	22	
13	Heybridge Swifts	28	7	5	16	34	60	−26	19	
14	Stansted	28	5	5	18	29	66	−37	15	
15	Brightlingsea United	28	4	4	20	24	69	−45	12	

Source: fchd
Rules for classification: 1) points; 2) goal difference; 3) number of goals scored.
