= 1994–95 Essex Senior Football League =

The 1994–95 season was the 24th in the history of Essex Senior Football League a football competition in England.

The league featured 15 clubs which competed in the league last season, no new clubs joined the league this season.

Great Wakering Rovers were champions, winning their first Essex Senior League title.

== League table ==
Essex Senior Football League
- Season: 1994–95
- Champions: Great Wakering Rovers
- Matches: 210
- Goals: 662 (3.15 per match)

Pos	Team	Pld	W	D	L	GF	GA	GD	Pts
1	Great Wakering Rovers	28	23	2	3	82	14	+68	71
2	Sawbridgeworth Town	28	23	2	3	73	20	+53	71
3	Romford	28	18	7	3	54	30	+24	61
4	Maldon Town	28	16	6	6	58	33	+25	54
5	Ford United	28	13	6	9	48	30	+18	45
6	Bowers United	28	12	3	13	41	45	−4	39
7	Burnham Ramblers	28	12	3	13	42	47	−5	39
8	Basildon United	28	10	8	10	57	35	+22	38
9	East Ham United	28	9	9	10	28	32	−4	36
10	Brentwood	28	7	11	10	39	37	+2	32
11	Concord Rangers	28	9	5	14	32	42	−10	32
12	Stansted	28	8	7	13	40	57	−17	31
13	Southend Manor	28	3	8	17	32	80	−48	17
14	Hullbridge Sports	28	4	1	23	17	67	−50	13
15	Eton Manor	28	2	4	22	19	93	−74	10

Source: fchd
Rules for classification: 1) points; 2) goal difference; 3) number of goals scored.
