= 1992–93 Essex Senior Football League =

The 1992–93 season was the 22nd in the history of Essex Senior Football League a football competition in England.

The league featured 15 clubs which competed in the league last season, along with two new clubs:

- Great Wakering Rovers, joined from the Essex Intermediate League
- Romford, new club formed after original club folded in 1978

Canvey Island were champions, winning their second Essex Senior League title.

== League table ==
Essex Senior Football League
- Season: 1992–93
- Champions: Canvey Island
- Matches: 272
- Goals: 876 (3.22 per match)

Pos	Team	Pld	W	D	L	GF	GA	GD	Pts	Promotion or relegation
1	Canvey Island	32	23	7	2	66	20	+46	76	
2	Sawbridgeworth Town	32	19	7	6	82	41	+41	64	
3	Bowers United	32	18	9	5	56	27	+29	63	
4	Burnham Ramblers	32	17	6	9	80	53	+27	57	
5	Basildon United	32	16	7	9	65	37	+28	55	
6	Brentwood	32	13	9	10	58	49	+9	48	
7	Great Wakering Rovers	32	13	8	11	50	43	+7	47	
8	Ford United	32	14	10	8	47	26	+21	46 (Note: Ford United were deducted six points.)	
9	Romford	32	12	9	11	48	42	+6	45	
10	Southend Manor	32	13	4	15	49	45	+4	43	
11	Concord Rangers	32	9	9	14	41	51	−10	36	
12	Maldon Town	32	8	10	14	45	59	−14	34	
13	East Ham United	32	10	4	18	46	67	−21	34	
14	Woodford Town	32	7	9	16	46	84	−38	30	Transferred to the Spartan League
15	Eton Manor	32	7	8	17	32	75	−43	29	
16	Hullbridge Sports	32	7	6	19	38	70	−32	27	
17	Stansted	32	2	6	24	27	87	−60	12	

Source: fchd
Rules for classification: 1) points; 2) goal difference; 3) number of goals scored.
