= 1990–91 Essex Senior Football League =

The 1990–91 season was the 20th in the history of Essex Senior Football League a football competition in England.

The league featured 14 clubs which competed in the league last season, along with one new club:

- Hullbridge Sports, joined from the Essex Intermediate League

Southend Manor were champions, winning their first Essex Senior League title.

== League table ==
Essex Senior Football League
- Season: 1990–91
- Champions: Southend Manor
- Matches: 210
- Goals: 635 (3.02 per match)

Pos	Team	Pld	W	D	L	GF	GA	GD	Pts
1	Southend Manor	28	20	4	4	52	20	+32	64
2	Brentwood	28	18	6	4	66	30	+36	60
3	Burnham Ramblers	28	17	8	3	57	30	+27	59
4	Sawbridgeworth Town	28	15	5	8	47	26	+21	50
5	Bowers United	28	14	7	7	50	32	+18	49
6	Stambridge	28	13	5	10	50	38	+12	44
7	Ford United	28	13	4	11	47	33	+14	43
8	East Thurrock United	28	11	9	8	46	38	+8	42
9	Canvey Island	28	9	7	12	34	47	−13	34
10	Stansted	28	7	8	13	40	42	−2	29
11	Eton Manor	28	6	9	13	35	45	−10	27
12	Hullbridge Sports	28	5	8	15	16	38	−22	23
13	Maldon Town	28	6	5	17	27	57	−30	23
14	East Ham United	28	5	4	19	35	95	−60	19
15	Woodford Town	28	5	3	20	33	64	−31	18

Source: fchd
Rules for classification: 1) points; 2) goal difference; 3) number of goals scored.
