= 1972–73 Essex Senior Football League =

The 1972–73 season was the second in the history of Essex Senior Football League, a football competition in England.

The league featured eight clubs which competed in the league last season, along with three new clubs:

- Brightlingsea United, joined from the Essex and Suffolk Border League
- Coggeshall Town, joined from the Essex and Suffolk Border League
- Maldon Town, transferred from the Eastern Counties League

Billericay Town were champions, winning their first Essex Senior League title.

== League table ==
Essex Senior Football League
- Season: 1972–73
- Champions: Billericay Town
- Matches played: 90
- Goals scored: 256 (2.84 per match)

Pos	Team	Pld	W	D	L	GF	GA	GD	Pts	Promotion or relegation
1	Billericay Town	18	13	5	0	38	12	+26	31	
2	Basildon United	18	11	4	3	37	19	+18	26	
3	Stansted	18	7	7	4	20	17	+3	21	
4	Brightlingsea United	18	7	6	5	30	27	+3	20	
5	Witham Town	18	6	6	6	20	17	+3	18	
6	Coggeshall Town	18	5	7	6	28	27	+1	17	
7	Tiptree United	18	5	4	9	26	34	−8	14	
8	Heybridge Swifts	18	6	2	10	21	34	−13	14	
9	Saffron Walden Town	18	4	2	12	20	35	−15	10	
10	Maldon Town	18	3	3	12	16	34	−18	9	
11	Pegasus Athletic	0	0	0	0	0	0	0	0	Club folded, record expunged

Source: fchd
Rules for classification: 1) points; 2) goal difference; 3) number of goals scored.
