= 1973–74 Essex Senior Football League =

The 1973–74 season was the third in the history of Essex Senior Football League, a football competition in England.

The league featured ten clubs which competed in the league last season, no new clubs joined the league this season.

Saffron Walden Town were champions, winning their first Essex Senior League title.

== League table ==
Essex Senior Football League
- Season: 1973–74
- Champions: Saffron Walden Town
- Matches played: 90
- Goals scored: 276 (3.07 per match)

Pos	Team	Pld	W	D	L	GF	GA	GD	Pts	Promotion or relegation
1	Saffron Walden Town	18	15	1	2	46	13	+33	31	Transferred to the Eastern Counties League
2	Billericay Town	18	14	1	3	40	10	+30	29	
3	Coggeshall Town	18	13	1	4	40	13	+27	27	
4	Tiptree United	18	11	2	5	33	21	+12	24	
5	Basildon United	18	6	6	6	27	23	+4	18	
6	Witham Town	18	7	3	8	34	25	+9	17	
7	Maldon Town	18	4	6	8	21	24	−3	14	
8	Brightlingsea United	18	3	3	12	15	51	−36	9	
9	Stansted	18	2	4	12	11	46	−35	8	
10	Heybridge Swifts	18	1	1	16	9	50	−41	3	

Source: fchd
Rules for classification: 1) points; 2) goal difference; 3) number of goals scored.
