= 2014–15 Isthmian League =

The 2014–15 season was the 100th season of the Isthmian League, which is an English football competition featuring semi-professional and amateur clubs from London, East and South East England.

Following the resignation of Vauxhall Motors from the Conference North, and the liquidation of Southern League Premier Division club Hinckley United, Redhill and Wroxham were reprieved from relegation in Division One South and Division One North respectively.

There was subsequently a further reprieve as Worksop Town resigned from the Northern Premier League. Wingate & Finchley had initially been relegated to Isthmian League Division One North, but were readmitted to the Premier Division. Knock-on effects included Ware moving back to Division One North after first being placed in the Southern League, and Hayes & Yeading United moving to the Southern Premier after initially being placed in the Isthmian Premier.

== Premier Division ==
Isthmian League Premier Division
- Season: 2014–15
- Champions: Maidstone United
- Promoted: Maidstone United; Margate
- Relegated: AFC Hornchurch; Bury Town; Peacehaven & Telscombe; Witham Town
- Matches: 552
- Goals: 1,577 (2.86 per match)
- Top goalscorer: 33 goals - Sam Higgins (East Thurrock United)
- Highest attendance: 3000 - Dulwich Hamlet 0 - 0 Maidstone United, (18 April)
- Total attendance: 215,462
- Average attendance: 390 (+3.4% to previous season)

The Premier Division consisted of 24 clubs: 19 clubs from the previous season, and five new clubs:

- Leatherhead, promoted as play-off winners in Division One South
- Peacehaven & Telscombe, promoted as champions of Division One South
- Tonbridge Angels, relegated from the Conference South
- VCD Athletic, promoted as champions of Division One North
- Witham Town, promoted as play-off winners in Division One North

Maidstone United won the division and were promoted to the Conference South, renamed the National League South for 2015–16. It would be the highest level Maidstone had reached since the club was reformed in 1992. Enfield Town initially finished the season in fifth place, but prior to the play-offs they were controversially deducted three points due to fielding an ineligible player, and dropped out of play-off zone. Margate won the play-offs and returned to the sixth tier after ten seasons in the Isthmian League. The four clubs that finished in the bottom four places were relegated. Peacehaven & Telscombe missed out on a reprieve by one point from Marine who finished 21st in the Northern Premier League.

=== League table ===
Pos	Team	Pld	W	D	L	GF	GA	GD	Pts	Promotion or relegation
1	Maidstone United	46	29	11	6	85	41	+44	98	Promoted to the National League South
2	Hendon	46	27	14	5	82	55	+27	95	Qualified for the play-offs
3	Margate	46	25	10	11	94	58	+36	85	Qualified for the play-offs, then promoted to the National League South
4	Dulwich Hamlet	46	21	13	12	66	51	+15	76	Qualified for the play-offs
5	Metropolitan Police	46	21	12	13	72	51	+21	75	Qualified for the play-offs
6	Grays Athletic	46	22	8	16	70	57	+13	74	
7	Enfield Town	46	24	4	18	70	56	+14	73 (Note: Enfield Town were deducted three points for fielding an ineligible player.)	
8	Billericay Town	46	20	8	18	73	65	+8	68	
9	Leiston	46	18	13	15	73	58	+15	67	
10	Leatherhead	46	19	10	17	72	62	+10	67	
11	Kingstonian	46	18	13	15	63	56	+7	67	
12	Wingate & Finchley	46	20	7	19	72	70	+2	67	
13	East Thurrock United	46	17	15	14	66	71	−5	66	
14	Bognor Regis Town	46	17	12	17	71	64	+7	63	
15	Hampton & Richmond	46	16	9	21	62	79	−17	57	
16	Harrow Borough	46	15	8	23	64	77	−13	53	
17	Canvey Island	46	14	11	21	61	77	−16	53	
18	VCD Athletic	46	14	11	21	53	70	−17	53	
19	Lewes	46	14	11	21	45	67	−22	53	
20	Tonbridge Angels	46	13	13	20	63	67	−4	52	
21	Peacehaven & Telscombe	46	13	9	24	58	85	−27	48	Relegated to Division One South
22	Witham Town	46	9	15	22	61	84	−23	42	Relegated to Division One North
23	AFC Hornchurch	46	10	10	26	46	70	−24	40	Relegated to Division One North
24	Bury Town	46	7	11	28	35	86	−51	32	Relegated to Division One North

Rules for classification: 1) points; 2) goal difference; 3) number of goals scored.

==== Top scorers ====
Player	Club	Goals
Sam Higgins	East Thurrock United	33
David Knight	Wingate & Finchley	29
Rowan Liburd	Billericay Town	22
Freddie Ladapo	Grays Athletic / Margate	22
Jay May	Maidstone United	22
Ryan Moss	Margate	22
George Purcell	AFC Hornchurch	20
Leon Smith	Hendon	19
Charles Moone	Hampton & Richmond Borough	19
Oliver Pearce	Bognor Regis Town	18
Kezie Ibe	Hendon	18

==== Play-offs ====
After Enfield Town were found guilty of fielding an ineligible player in two matches, they were deducted three points, resulting in Metropolitan Police moving into a play-off position. Both play-off semi-finals were postponed until Enfield Town's appeal was (unsuccessfully) concluded.

===== Semifinals =====
14 May 2015	Hendon	2–1	Metropolitan Police	Earlsmead Stadium, South Harrow
19:45	Maclaren 32'; Da Costa 47'		Collins 17' (pen.)	Attendance: 367

14 May 2015	Margate	2–1	Dulwich Hamlet	Hartsdown Park, Margate
19:45	Moss 41'; Taylor 77'		Clunis 68'	Attendance: 1,073

===== Final =====
17 May 2015	Hendon	0–1	Margate	Earlsmead Stadium, South Harrow
15:00			Moss 39'	Attendance: 1,228

=== Results ===
Home \ Away	AFC	BIL	BOG	BUR	CAN	DUL	ETU	ENF	GRY	H&R	HAR	HEN	KIN	LEA	LEI	LEW	MDS	MAR	MET	PET	TON	VCD	W&F	WIT
AFC Hornchurch		2–2	0–0	1–1	2–0	1–0	1–1	0–1	2–0	0–1	1–3	0–2	0–0	1–3	1–1	0–1	0–2	0–2	2–2	1–1	0–0	2–0	0–1	2–1
Billericay Town	3–1		1–2	4–1	0–1	2–1	2–0	5–0	2–0	1–1	0–1	0–2	0–2	2–0	4–0	2–2	1–3	4–3	3–0	1–1	3–3	2–1	2–3	3–0
Bognor Regis Town	1–2	1–1		1–1	2–1	4–0	0–1	2–1	1–2	3–0	2–0	4–1	1–1	1–2	2–2	1–2	3–4	0–1	2–0	3–1	0–0	2–1	3–2	5–2
Bury Town	1–4	2–1	1–1		1–0	1–3	0–1	1–1	0–2	0–2	2–1	1–3	0–3	1–1	0–0	0–2	1–2	1–4	2–1	1–2	2–1	2–3	1–2	0–0
Canvey Island	0–3	1–0	3–1	3–4		1–2	1–2	2–1	1–1	0–4	1–0	0–1	1–3	1–1	1–3	1–1	1–2	2–2	4–4	2–1	5–2	1–0	3–2	1–1
Dulwich Hamlet	2–0	2–1	0–1	3–0	0–3		3–3	2–1	2–0	2–2	3–2	0–0	2–1	4–1	1–2	2–0	0–0	2–1	0–0	3–1	2–0	1–2	3–3	1–0
East Thurrock United	1–0	2–1	1–1	1–1	1–0	2–2		1–1	0–2	1–0	1–3	1–1	0–1	1–1	1–0	0–0	1–1	1–1	0–5	4–0	2–1	3–2	0–0	2–1
Enfield Town	3–2	4–0	2–0	1–0	3–2	0–1	0–2		2–2	1–0	5–0	1–0	2–5	3–1	0–2	3–0	0–4	3–1	1–0	1–0	2–1	1–0	2–3	2–0
Grays Athletic	1–0	2–0	0–1	2–0	1–2	1–0	1–3	3–1		3–2	2–1	0–0	3–1	1–1	1–1	1–3	0–0	0–2	0–1	1–0	3–1	1–1	3–2	4–0
Hampton & Richmond	2–1	1–2	1–1	1–0	1–2	1–0	2–1	1–0	0–4		2–1	2–2	2–0	1–5	4–6	2–1	2–1	2–0	2–2	1–3	0–1	2–1	1–4	2–4
Harrow Borough	0–3	1–2	1–2	3–1	1–0	1–3	2–4	2–0	1–4	1–2		2–2	2–0	3–2	2–0	1–1	1–1	1–2	2–2	2–0	0–1	2–0	5–1	3–3
Hendon	4–2	1–1	1–0	2–0	1–0	2–2	1–1	0–3	3–2	2–2	2–0		3–1	2–0	2–1	2–1	2–1	3–2	2–1	3–2	1–0	1–1	3–1	2–0
Kingstonian	1–0	2–2	1–2	0–0	1–1	1–1	2–2	0–1	0–2	1–1	0–1	2–2		2–2	0–1	3–0	0–1	3–3	3–1	3–0	1–0	0–1	3–2	2–1
Leatherhead	2–1	0–1	4–3	4–0	1–0	2–0	2–1	0–2	3–1	3–1	0–1	2–3	1–2		1–0	0–1	1–1	1–0	1–1	2–2	1–2	0–1	2–0	1–2
Leiston	4–0	2–1	3–2	0–1	1–1	0–2	1–2	2–2	3–0	2–0	0–0	0–1	0–1	1–2		3–0	2–2	0–1	1–1	5–0	2–1	1–2	2–0	1–1
Lewes	2–2	0–2	1–0	1–0	1–2	1–0	3–2	2–1	3–2	0–0	0–1	1–2	1–0	0–1	0–2		0–2	1–5	2–0	2–2	0–0	2–2	3–0	2–2
Maidstone United	2–0	3–0	2–1	1–0	5–2	1–1	3–2	0–3	2–1	2–0	2–1	1–1	4–1	2–1	4–1	2–1		2–1	3–1	2–0	1–1	2–0	3–0	1–1
Margate	5–1	5–1	3–1	3–0	4–2	1–2	3–1	0–3	3–0	1–0	3–3	4–4	2–0	1–0	1–1	3–0	1–0		2–1	1–2	2–2	0–3	0–0	2–1
Metropolitan Police	2–1	2–1	2–0	4–1	1–1	0–0	5–0	1–0	0–1	3–0	1–0	2–0	0–0	3–3	3–1	2–0	2–0	0–3		2–0	2–1	1–0	1–2	3–1
Peacehaven & Telscombe	2–1	0–2	1–1	1–0	0–1	0–1	4–3	0–2	2–5	2–4	4–1	2–0	1–2	2–5	0–4	2–0	1–1	0–2	2–0		4–1	1–1	1–2	3–3
Tonbridge Angels	4–0	0–1	1–1	1–1	4–1	2–2	3–1	2–1	1–2	2–0	1–1	3–3	0–2	0–3	1–2	2–0	1–0	2–2	0–2	1–2		4–1	1–2	3–0
VCD Athletic	0–2	2–0	1–3	1–1	2–2	0–3	2–2	2–1	1–2	2–1	3–2	1–3	1–1	2–0	2–2	2–0	0–2	0–3	1–1	0–2	0–3		2–0	2–0
Wingate & Finchley	1–0	0–1	4–1	4–0	2–0	3–0	3–4	1–0	1–0	2–2	3–1	1–2	1–2	0–0	3–4	2–0	0–2	1–1	0–2	1–1	2–0	2–0		3–2
Witham Town	2–1	2–3	2–2	4–1	1–1	0–0	2–0	1–2	1–1	3–2	3–1	1–2	2–3	2–3	1–1	1–1	1–3	1–2	0–2	1–0	2–2	1–1	1–0	

Updated to match(es) played on 25 April 2015. Source: IL Premier Division results grid
Legend: Blue = home team win; Yellow = draw; Red = away team win.

=== Stadia and locations ===
Locations of the Premier Division clubs
Greater London Premier Division football clubs

Club	Stadium	Capacity
AFC Hornchurch	Hornchurch Stadium	3,500
Billericay Town	New Lodge	3,500
Bognor Regis Town	Nyewood Lane	4,500
Bury Town	Ram Meadow	3,500
Canvey Island	Park Lane	4,500
Dulwich Hamlet	Champion Hill	3,000
East Thurrock United	Rookery Hill	4,000
Enfield Town	Queen Elizabeth II Stadium	2,500
Grays Athletic	The Mill Field (groundshare with Aveley)	1,100
Hampton & Richmond Borough	Beveree Stadium	3,500
Harrow Borough	Earlsmead Stadium	3,070
Hendon	Earlsmead Stadium (groundshare with Harrow Borough)	3,070
Kingstonian	Kingsmeadow (groundshare with AFC Wimbledon)	4,850
Leatherhead	Fetcham Grove	3,400
Leiston	Victory Road	2,500
Lewes	The Dripping Pan	3,000
Maidstone United	Gallagher Stadium	2,500
Margate	Hartsdown Park	2,100
Metropolitan Police	Imber Court	3,000
Peacehaven & Telscombe	The Sports Park	1,500
Tonbridge Angels	Longmead Stadium	5,000
VCD Athletic	Oakwood	1,180
Wingate & Finchley	The Harry Abrahams Stadium	1,500
Witham Town	Spa Road	2,500

== Division One North ==
Isthmian League Division One North
- Season: 2014–15
- Champions: Needham Market
- Promoted: Brentwood Town; Needham Market
- Relegated: Burnham Ramblers
- Matches: 552
- Goals: 1,830 (3.32 per match)
- Top goalscorer: 32 goals - Alexander Read (Harlow Town)
- Highest attendance: 972 - Needham Market 2 - 2 Harlow Town, (18 April)
- Total attendance: 68,441
- Average attendance: 124 (+17.0% to previous season)

Division One North consisted of 24 clubs: 20 clubs from the previous season, and four new clubs:

- Brightlingsea Regent, promoted as runners-up in the Eastern Counties League
- Cray Wanderers, relegated from the Premier Division
- Great Wakering Rovers, promoted as champions of the Essex Senior League
- Thamesmead Town, relegated from the Premier Division

Needham Market won the division and were promoted to the Premier Division after three play-off defeats in the four previous seasons. This was the highest level so far reached by the club in its history. Brentwood Town won the play-offs and joined Needham Market in the Premier Division after eight years in Division One North. Burnham Ramblers finished bottom of the table and were the only relegated club after Barkingside and Redbridge were reprieved. This was due to Salisbury City not starting the season, Hereford United folding during the season and the lack of clubs promoting from the ninth tier.

=== League table ===
Pos	Team	Pld	W	D	L	GF	GA	GD	Pts	Promotion or relegation
1	Needham Market	46	33	5	8	101	41	+60	104	Promoted to the Premier Division
2	Harlow Town	46	31	10	5	108	58	+50	103	Qualified for the play-offs
3	AFC Sudbury	46	28	6	12	89	51	+38	90	Qualified for the play-offs
4	Brentwood Town	46	25	10	11	83	63	+20	85	Qualified for the play-offs, then promoted to the Premier Division
5	Thurrock	46	25	9	12	104	57	+47	84	Qualified for the play-offs
6	Brightlingsea Regent	46	25	7	14	88	57	+31	82	
7	Dereham Town	46	25	6	15	82	63	+19	81	
8	Wroxham	46	23	10	13	97	58	+39	79	
9	Aveley	46	21	7	18	86	75	+11	70	
10	Ware	46	16	16	14	76	60	+16	64	Transferred to SFL Division One Central
11	Soham Town Rangers	46	19	6	21	74	86	−12	63	
12	Heybridge Swifts	46	17	11	18	70	75	−5	62	
13	Thamesmead Town	46	16	10	20	61	69	−8	58	
14	Tilbury	46	16	10	20	64	76	−12	58	
15	Great Wakering Rovers	46	14	10	22	80	87	−7	52	
16	Cray Wanderers	46	14	10	22	77	86	−9	52	
17	Waltham Abbey	46	14	10	22	76	90	−14	52	
18	Cheshunt	46	13	13	20	63	78	−15	52	
19	Maldon & Tiptree	46	13	10	23	57	78	−21	49	
20	Romford	46	13	9	24	69	99	−30	48	
21	Chatham Town	46	12	11	23	52	75	−23	47	Transferred to Division One South
22	Barkingside	46	12	9	25	59	98	−39	45	Reprieved from relegation
23	Redbridge	46	13	6	27	64	111	−47	45	Reprieved from relegation
24	Burnham Ramblers	46	5	7	34	50	138	−88	22	Relegated to the Essex Senior League

Rules for classification: 1) points; 2) goal difference; 3) number of goals scored.

==== Top scorers ====
Player	Club	Goals
Alexander Read	Harlow Town	32
Sam Newson	Needham Market	29
Jason Hallett	Waltham Abbey	28
Christy Finch	Wroxham	28
Remy Gordon	Wroxham	24

==== Play-offs ====
===== Semifinals =====
29 April 2015	Harlow Town	3–4 (a.e.t.)	Thurrock	Barrows Farm, Harlow
19:45	Read 17' 32'; Dadson 106'; Goodhind (red card) 120'	Harlow Town report	Goodhind 1' (o.g.); Stimson 66'; Thompson 93'; Wall 104'; Stimson (red card) 123'	Attendance: 901

29 April 2015	AFC Sudbury	0–0 (1–4 p)	Brentwood Town	Kings Marsh, Sudbury, Suffolk
19:45		Sudbury report	Ngandu (red card) 108'	Attendance: 543
	Penalties
	Baker (penalty missed); Parker (penalty scored); Newby (penalty missed)		Robinson (penalty scored); Dobbs (penalty scored); Lowe (penalty scored); Stokes (penalty scored)

===== Final =====
3 May 2015	Brentwood Town	5–0	Thurrock	Brentwood Centre Arena, Brentwood
15:00	Akrofi 50' 59' 63'; Rees 64'; Sherwin 85'		Waters (red card) 62'	Attendance: 763

=== Results ===
Home \ Away	SUD	AVE	BAR	BRE	BRI	BUR	CHA	CHE	CRA	DER	GWR	HAR	HEY	M&T	NDH	RED	ROM	SOH	THA	THU	TIL	WAL	WAR	WRO
AFC Sudbury		0–3	5–1	0–1	0–1	2–1	2–0	1–3	2–1	0–2	6–1	1–1	1–0	1–0	1–3	5–0	3–0	3–1	3–3	2–6	4–0	3–0	3–2	1–0
Aveley	3–0		0–2	1–1	0–3	3–0	2–1	1–0	3–2	3–1	3–1	1–2	2–1	1–1	2–0	7–0	4–4	3–1	3–3	0–4	0–2	0–2	2–3	0–5
Barkingside	0–3	0–1		4–2	1–2	2–0	1–0	3–2	1–1	0–2	2–3	1–2	2–1	1–0	0–1	1–1	1–1	2–1	0–2	0–2	0–2	0–5	1–1	1–2
Brentwood Town	1–4	3–1	1–3		2–1	4–2	2–2	0–0	3–3	0–1	3–0	1–2	3–3	2–0	1–3	1–0	1–0	2–2	1–1	0–3	1–0	3–2	0–2	5–1
Brightlingsea Regent	3–0	0–2	1–1	0–2		1–1	0–2	0–1	2–4	2–0	4–1	1–1	0–2	2–0	1–0	4–0	3–1	1–0	5–0	3–1	5–0	1–1	1–0	2–0
Burnham Ramblers	0–3	0–4	3–3	0–2	2–3		1–2	3–3	0–4	0–2	1–6	2–4	1–4	2–1	0–3	3–4	0–3	1–2	3–2	1–3	2–1	3–4	1–5	2–2
Chatham Town	0–1	0–5	2–0	0–1	5–1	1–0		1–1	1–0	3–1	0–0	1–2	0–1	1–0	0–5	2–1	0–2	3–1	2–2	1–5	0–1	0–0	1–1	2–3
Cheshunt	0–1	2–1	5–2	2–3	1–5	0–0	0–0		1–1	0–1	0–0	0–2	2–1	2–4	0–2	3–5	0–1	2–3	0–0	2–0	2–1	2–2	2–1	1–3
Cray Wanderers	1–5	3–3	4–2	2–3	0–3	2–0	3–0	1–4		2–3	3–1	2–2	3–0	1–2	1–3	1–4	2–1	1–1	1–1	0–3	4–1	4–0	1–1	2–3
Dereham Town	3–1	2–1	1–2	2–1	2–1	7–0	1–1	0–3	0–2		1–4	0–1	4–2	3–1	3–1	4–0	2–1	1–1	0–1	2–1	4–1	1–0	0–0	2–0
Great Wakering Rovers	1–5	2–2	2–0	1–2	1–3	0–1	1–2	3–2	0–2	2–2		2–4	1–0	1–2	2–2	6–2	3–0	4–1	4–0	2–2	2–2	1–1	1–2	0–4
Harlow Town	0–0	3–1	5–2	1–1	4–0	4–2	2–1	5–1	0–2	6–3	3–1		2–3	3–1	2–1	4–0	3–1	1–0	2–1	1–1	2–2	4–1	3–2	1–1
Heybridge Swifts	2–3	4–3	1–1	2–0	1–1	1–0	1–1	0–0	2–1	2–4	2–1	2–4		1–1	1–0	1–1	2–3	3–3	1–1	0–2	2–2	1–0	2–4	1–1
Maldon & Tiptree	0–1	2–1	1–1	1–2	0–3	1–1	0–2	2–2	3–1	1–1	3–5	1–0	0–3		1–1	3–2	2–1	1–2	2–0	0–0	1–2	4–2	2–2	1–2
Needham Market	1–0	3–0	4–1	1–2	4–1	5–0	2–1	4–2	3–0	1–1	1–0	2–2	1–2	4–2		1–0	6–2	2–0	2–0	2–0	5–3	2–1	0–1	2–0
Redbridge	0–2	2–1	2–4	1–2	1–5	4–3	4–1	2–1	0–1	2–1	1–3	1–3	2–1	4–1	0–3		2–1	2–0	0–2	1–3	2–1	1–1	0–0	0–3
Romford	0–1	1–3	5–1	0–5	2–2	4–0	3–1	2–0	2–2	4–2	0–3	2–2	1–3	0–2	1–3	2–1		1–2	2–1	2–2	2–2	1–1	3–1	2–2
Soham Town Rangers	1–1	2–1	1–5	0–2	1–2	6–2	2–1	1–2	4–2	2–1	3–1	0–1	3–1	0–2	1–3	5–1	2–1		0–1	0–2	4–2	2–1	2–2	3–1
Thamesmead Town	0–1	0–1	2–1	1–2	2–0	1–2	1–1	5–0	2–0	0–2	1–0	3–2	1–0	1–0	2–3	1–0	0–1	4–0		2–2	2–1	2–0	1–2	0–3
Thurrock	0–2	0–2	5–0	2–3	1–3	5–1	4–2	1–1	1–0	2–0	2–1	2–1	0–1	1–1	0–1	4–2	6–2	4–1	3–0		4–0	5–2	1–1	3–0
Tilbury	1–1	0–1	2–2	1–0	2–1	2–0	1–0	1–3	2–0	0–2	0–0	2–3	3–0	2–1	0–1	2–2	1–0	3–0	2–1	3–4		1–3	1–1	1–2
Waltham Abbey	1–4	4–1	3–1	3–3	2–3	5–3	3–2	1–0	2–2	1–2	1–3	1–2	1–2	0–2	0–2	4–1	2–1	2–3	3–3	1–1	0–4		1–3	2–1
Ware	1–1	2–2	3–0	1–2	2–1	0–0	2–2	1–2	4–1	1–2	4–0	1–2	2–4	4–0	1–2	1–1	4–0	0–1	3–2	1–0	0–0	0–1		1–3
Wroxham	2–0	1–2	3–0	1–1	1–1	8–0	3–1	1–1	2–1	3–1	1–1	1–2	3–0	4–1	0–0	3–2	8–0	2–3	3–0	4–1	0–1	0–3	1–1	

Updated to match(es) played on 25 April 2015. Source: IL Division One North results grid
Legend: Blue = home team win; Yellow = draw; Red = away team win.

=== Stadia and locations ===
Locations of Division One North clubs
Greater London Division One North clubs

Club	Stadium	Capacity
AFC Sudbury	King's Marsh	2,500
Aveley	The Mill Field	1,100
Barkingside	Cricklefield Stadium (groundshare with Ilford)	3,500
Brentwood Town	The Brentwood Centre Arena	1,800
Brightlingsea Regent	North Road	1,000
Burnham Ramblers	Leslie Fields	2,000
Chatham Town	The Sports Ground	5,000
Cheshunt	Cheshunt Stadium	3,000
Cray Wanderers	Hayes Lane (groundshare with Bromley)	6,000
Dereham Town	Aldiss Park	3,000
Great Wakering Rovers	Burroughs Park	2,500
Harlow Town	Barrows Farm	3,500
Heybridge Swifts	Scraley Road	3,000
Maldon & Tiptree	Wallace Binder Ground	2,000
Needham Market	Bloomfields	4,000
Redbridge	Oakside	3,000
Romford	Ship Lane (groundshare with Thurrock)	3,500
Soham Town Rangers	Julius Martin Lane	2,000
Thamesmead Town	Bayliss Avenue	6,000
Thurrock	Ship Lane	3,500
Tilbury	Chadfields	4,000
Waltham Abbey	Capershotts	3,500
Ware	Wodson Park	3,300
Wroxham	Trafford Park	2,000

== Division One South ==
Isthmian League Division One South
- Season: 2014–15
- Champions: Burgess Hill Town
- Promoted: Burgess Hill Town; Merstham
- Relegated: Redhill; Horsham
- Matches: 552
- Goals: 1,837 (3.33 per match)
- Top goalscorer: 34 goals - Ian Draycott (Folkestone Invicta); Chris Smith (South Park)
- Highest attendance: 1052 - Folkestone Invicta 1 - 0 Chipstead, (3 April)
- Total attendance: 117,744
- Average attendance: 213 (+3.0% to previous season)

Division One South consisted of 24 clubs: 20 clubs from the previous season, and four new clubs:

- Carshalton Athletic, relegated from the Premier Division
- East Grinstead Town, promoted as runners-up in the Sussex County League
- South Park, promoted as champions of the Combined Counties League
- Whyteleafe, promoted as champions of the Southern Counties East League

Burgess Hill Town won the division achieving the longest unbeaten run in this season's levels 1-8 of 36 matches. They were promoted to the Premier Division along with play-off winners Merstham. Horsham and Redhill were relegated, while East Grinstead Town were given a reprieve due to Salisbury City failing to start the season, Hereford United folding during the season and the lack of clubs promoting from the ninth tier. Horsham lost their place in the Isthmian League after 32 seasons.

=== League table ===
Pos	Team	Pld	W	D	L	GF	GA	GD	Pts	Promotion or relegation
1	Burgess Hill Town	46	33	10	3	105	39	+66	109	Promoted to the Premier Division
2	Folkestone Invicta	46	29	11	6	106	47	+59	98	Qualified for the play-offs
3	Faversham Town	46	30	7	9	111	52	+59	97	Qualified for the play-offs
4	Merstham	46	27	12	7	107	51	+56	93	Qualified for the play-offs, then promoted to the Premier Division
5	Whyteleafe	46	23	12	11	91	61	+30	81	Qualified for the play-offs
6	Worthing	46	22	10	14	92	65	+27	76	
7	Three Bridges	46	21	9	16	94	95	−1	72	
8	Whitstable Town	46	20	11	15	82	77	+5	71	
9	Herne Bay	46	20	9	17	62	65	−3	69	
10	Guernsey	46	19	7	20	92	94	−2	64	
11	Tooting & Mitcham United	46	15	14	17	77	66	+11	59	
12	Sittingbourne	46	16	11	19	55	69	−14	59	
13	Corinthian-Casuals	46	16	10	20	64	82	−18	58	
14	South Park	46	16	8	22	76	105	−29	56	
15	Chipstead	46	15	9	22	67	84	−17	54	
16	Hythe Town	46	14	11	21	82	79	+3	53	
17	Walton & Hersham	46	14	11	21	59	75	−16	53	
18	Walton Casuals	46	16	5	25	62	94	−32	53	
19	Hastings United	46	12	12	22	57	70	−13	48	
20	Carshalton Athletic	46	13	9	24	61	79	−18	48	
21	Ramsgate	46	13	9	24	61	86	−25	48	
22	East Grinstead Town	46	13	6	27	55	94	−39	45	Reprieved from relegation
23	Redhill	46	10	11	25	69	101	−32	41	Relegated to the Combined Counties League
24	Horsham	46	10	6	30	50	107	−57	36	Relegated to the Southern Combination League

Rules for classification: 1) points; 2) goal difference; 3) number of goals scored.

==== Top scorers ====
Player	Club	Goals
Ian Draycott	Folkestone Invicta	34
Chris Smith	South Park	34
Daniel Summers	Tooting & Mitcham United	28
Ian Pulman	Whitstable Town	25
Wayne Wilson	Faversham Town	24

==== Play-offs ====
===== Semifinals =====
28 April 2015	Folkestone Invicta	2–1 (a.e.t.)	Whyteleafe	Cheriton Road, Folkestone
19:45	Draycott 42'; Thompson 93' (o.g.)		D'Sane 55'	Attendance: 788

28 April 2015	Faversham Town	0–0 (4–5 p)	Merstham	Shepherd Neame Stadium, Faversham
19:45				Attendance: 628

===== Final =====
2 May 2015	Folkestone Invicta	0–3	Merstham	Cheriton Road, Folkestone
15:00			Roberts 6'; Henriques 45'; Saraiva 51'	Attendance: 1,465

=== Results ===
Home \ Away	BUR	CAR	CHI	COR	EGT	FAV	FOL	GUE	HAS	HER	HOR	HYT	MER	RAM	RED	SIT	SPK	THR	T&M	W&H	WAL	WHT	WHY	WOR
Burgess Hill Town		2–1	3–0	2–1	3–1	2–1	3–1	3–0	4–1	1–0	7–0	2–2	2–0	2–1	3–3	1–0	2–1	3–0	2–1	2–2	3–0	5–0	0–1	2–3
Carshalton Athletic	0–2		0–0	0–1	3–1	1–2	5–3	1–1	3–0	0–0	0–1	0–3	0–3	4–0	3–0	2–0	5–3	3–2	1–2	1–0	2–1	1–1	2–3	0–1
Chipstead	1–2	2–1		0–2	2–0	3–1	0–3	3–1	2–1	3–4	0–0	3–2	0–1	1–2	2–1	1–2	0–3	1–2	2–2	1–1	0–2	3–2	4–4	2–4
Corinthian-Casuals	1–1	4–1	3–1		1–2	1–0	0–0	3–1	1–0	0–1	4–0	1–6	0–3	3–0	1–5	0–3	1–1	1–4	1–1	2–0	4–1	1–2	1–5	0–3
East Grinstead Town	2–3	2–1	1–2	4–1		1–3	2–0	1–5	1–3	0–1	2–1	2–3	2–3	1–1	2–3	0–4	2–1	2–2	0–2	2–0	0–2	0–0	0–6	0–1
Faversham Town	0–0	5–0	2–1	1–1	3–0		2–2	3–0	1–5	4–1	2–0	3–1	1–1	3–1	3–2	3–0	4–1	3–0	1–0	5–0	5–1	1–3	2–3	2–1
Folkestone Invicta	1–1	3–1	1–0	4–1	3–1	1–2		5–2	1–0	2–0	5–0	1–0	2–2	5–2	2–0	3–2	6–0	1–2	2–0	2–1	2–1	2–3	0–0	2–1
Guernsey	0–2	0–2	3–2	3–0	2–4	0–2	0–0		1–0	3–4	2–1	0–1	1–2	1–1	3–1	3–0	1–3	8–1	3–2	2–1	0–3	2–2	3–0	5–2
Hastings United	1–2	1–2	0–1	0–2	1–2	2–1	0–2	4–1		1–0	0–2	2–1	1–1	1–0	1–1	1–1	3–3	2–2	0–3	1–2	2–2	1–1	2–2	1–1
Herne Bay	0–1	4–2	2–3	2–1	4–0	1–3	2–2	1–1	0–2		2–1	1–0	1–1	1–0	0–0	2–0	2–1	0–6	1–3	0–2	3–1	0–2	1–3	1–0
Horsham	2–2	0–0	1–2	2–1	2–1	1–2	0–3	2–4	1–2	0–2		4–1	2–1	3–5	0–4	1–0	0–2	3–4	2–2	1–1	1–2	0–2	1–3	0–5
Hythe Town	0–1	2–1	1–1	1–1	1–2	2–1	0–2	6–0	2–0	1–2	4–0		3–3	2–2	4–1	1–2	2–0	3–0	2–2	2–3	2–2	2–3	0–2	1–1
Merstham	3–4	2–0	4–1	3–0	0–1	0–2	1–3	8–0	2–1	0–0	2–1	4–0		0–2	4–3	3–1	1–1	6–0	3–2	1–1	5–2	3–0	2–0	2–2
Ramsgate	1–2	3–1	2–3	2–2	3–2	0–5	2–0	0–0	0–1	0–2	1–1	3–3	2–3		1–0	0–2	1–3	3–3	1–0	0–1	1–0	1–3	1–4	3–2
Redhill	1–1	0–3	1–4	2–3	1–1	1–3	1–3	2–2	3–1	2–1	2–0	2–2	0–3	1–3		1–1	3–2	0–2	4–3	2–0	0–1	2–3	0–1	1–2
Sittingbourne	0–4	0–0	1–1	1–1	2–1	0–0	0–3	0–2	1–3	1–1	2–1	2–1	0–5	1–1	5–3		0–2	2–0	0–0	2–1	3–4	3–0	0–1	0–0
South Park	1–4	3–1	2–2	4–1	3–1	0–4	0–5	1–7	3–2	0–2	2–3	2–2	1–1	2–1	1–3	1–3		3–1	2–2	1–0	3–1	2–1	0–1	0–7
Three Bridges	0–0	3–2	4–2	2–1	1–2	1–4	1–1	2–0	3–2	3–2	2–1	3–4	2–3	2–1	5–0	0–0	4–0		3–0	4–2	4–2	2–1	2–2	2–6
Tooting & Mitcham United	1–2	1–1	4–2	1–1	0–1	2–3	1–3	5–2	1–1	1–0	5–0	2–0	1–1	3–2	2–2	2–0	4–1	4–0		1–1	4–1	1–1	0–2	1–3
Walton & Hersham	0–2	1–3	1–0	2–0	1–1	1–4	2–6	0–3	2–2	1–1	3–0	4–1	1–2	2–1	5–0	1–2	1–1	1–0	2–1		2–3	2–0	0–5	1–0
Walton Casuals	0–3	0–1	2–0	1–1	1–1	3–3	0–4	2–5	0–2	0–2	0–2	1–0	1–2	0–1	2–1	1–2	2–1	1–3	1–0	1–0		3–1	2–1	0–2
Whitstable Town	1–1	4–1	0–1	1–2	2–1	1–3	2–2	3–4	1–0	4–1	2–1	0–2	1–1	3–1	3–1	4–1	4–2	2–2	0–1	3–2	5–4		2–2	1–0
Whyteleafe	2–1	1–0	1–1	2–3	5–0	2–2	1–1	1–0	0–0	0–1	3–4	3–2	1–5	1–0	1–1	2–3	1–3	3–1	2–0	1–1	4–1	1–1		2–3
Worthing	1–5	2–2	2–1	1–3	2–0	1–2	1–1	4–3	2–0	3–3	4–1	2–1	0–1	1–2	4–0	1–0	1–4	2–2	1–1	1–1	1–2	3–1	2–0	

Updated to match(es) played on 25 April 2015. Source: IL Division One South results grid
Legend: Blue = home team win; Yellow = draw; Red = away team win.

=== Stadia and locations ===
Locations of Division One South clubs
Greater London Division One South clubs

Club	Stadium	Capacity
Burgess Hill Town	Leylands Park	2,500
Carshalton Athletic	War Memorial Sports Ground	5,000
Chipstead	High Road	2,000
Corinthian-Casuals	King George's Field	2,700
East Grinstead Town	East Court	1,000
Faversham Town	Shepherd Neame Stadium	2,000
Folkestone Invicta	Cheriton Road	4,000
Guernsey	Footes Lane	5,000
Hastings United	The Pilot Field	4,050
Herne Bay	Winch's Field	4,000
Horsham	Gorings Mead	1,500
Hythe Town	Reachfields Stadium	3,000
Merstham	Moatside	2,000
Ramsgate	Southwood Stadium	2,500
Redhill	Kiln Brow	2,000
Sittingbourne	Woodstock Park	3,000
South Park	King George's Field	2,000
Three Bridges	Jubilee Field	1,500
Tooting & Mitcham United	Imperial Fields	3,500
Walton & Hersham	The Sports Ground	2,000
Walton Casuals	Waterside Stadium	2,000
Whitstable Town	The Belmont Ground	3,000
Whyteleafe	Church Road	2,000
Worthing	Worthing Stadium	4,000

== League Cup ==
2014–15 Isthmian League Cup
Tournament details
- Country: England
- Teams: 64

Final positions
- Champions: Hendon
- Runners-up: Grays Athletic

Tournament statistics
- Matches played: 63
- Goals scored: 213 (3.38 per match)

The Isthmian League Cup 2014–15 (billed as the Robert Dyas Cup 2014–15 for sponsorship reasons) is the 41st season of the Isthmian League Cup, the cup competition of the whole Isthmian League.

=== Calendar ===
Round	Dates	Matches	Clubs
First round	6 October to 12 November	32	64 → 32
Second round	11 November to 22 December	16	32 → 16
Third round	4 December to 9 February	8	16 → 8
Quarterfinals	10 February to 18 February	4	8 → 4
Semifinals	11 March	2	4 → 2
Final	15 April	1	2 → 1

The Isthmian League Cup was voluntary this season, eight clubs decided not to take part in the competition:

- Bognor Regis Town
- Canvey Island
- Dereham Town
- Guernsey
- Hastings United
- Soham Town Rangers
- VCD Athletic
- Wroxham

=== First round ===
All sixty-four clubs participated in the League Cup from the First round.

Tie	Home team (tier)	Score	Away team (tier)	Att.
1	AFC Sudbury (N)	2–1	Bury Town (P)	139
2	Aveley (N)	1–2	Redbridge (N)	62
3	Barkingside (N)	3–1	Thamesmead Town (N)	51
4	Billericay Town (P)	8–2	Great Wakering Rovers (N)	107
5	Burnham Ramblers (N)	1–3	Brightlingsea Regent (N)	55
6	Carshalton Athletic (S)	1–1	Whyteleafe (S)	106
Whyteleafe advance 4–2 on penalties
7	Corinthian-Casuals (S)	0–3	Kingstonian (P)	151
8	Dulwich Hamlet (P)	2–2	Walton & Hersham (S)	133
Walton & Hersham advance 4–1 on penalties
9	East Grinstead Town (S)	4–2	Three Bridges (S)	79
10	East Thurrock United (P)	0–2	AFC Hornchurch (P)	118
11	Enfield Town (P)	1–0	Harrow Borough (P)	112
12	Grays Athletic (P)	3–1	Tilbury (N)	103
13	Heybridge Swifts (N)	2–4	Brentwood Town (N)	62
14	Leiston (P)	1–1	Needham Market (N)	161
Leiston advance 3–0 on penalties
15	Lewes (P)	0–1	Peacehaven & Telscombe (P)	191

Tie	Home team (tier)	Score	Away team (tier)	Att.
16	Maidstone United (P)	4–2	Cray Wanderers (N)	627
17	Maldon & Tiptree (N)	0–1	Witham Town (P)	71
18	Margate (P)	2–0	Hythe Town (S)	324
19	Metropolitan Police (P)	1–2	Hampton & Richmond Borough (P)	92
20	Ramsgate (S)	1–1	Folkestone Invicta (S)	128
Ramsgate advance 4–3 on penalties
21	Redhill (S)	1–3	Burgess Hill Town (S)	73
22	Sittingbourne (S)	0–1	Faversham Town (S)	84
23	South Park (S)	0–2	Leatherhead (P)	96
24	Thurrock (N)	5–1	Romford (N)	76
25	Tonbridge Angels (P)	2–1	Chatham Town (N)	182
26	Tooting & Mitcham United (S)	0–5	Merstham (S)	161
27	Waltham Abbey (N)	0–1	Cheshunt (N)	92
28	Walton Casuals (S)	2–1	Chipstead (S)	46
29	Ware (N)	1–2	Harlow Town (N)	135
30	Whitstable Town (S)	1–2	Herne Bay (S)	233
31	Wingate & Finchley (P)	3–4	Hendon (P)	102
32	Worthing (S)	3–4	Horsham (S)	138

=== Second round ===
Tie	Home team (tier)	Score	Away team (tier)	Att.
33	AFC Sudbury (N)	3–1	Leiston (P)	144
34	Barkingside (N)	0–1	Grays Athletic (P)	115
35	Billericay Town (P)	2–1	Brentwood Town (N)	108
36	Brightlingsea Regent (N)	0–2	Witham Town (P)	74
37	Burgess Hill Town (S)	5–1	Horsham (S)	137
38	East Grinstead Town (S)	2–1	Peacehaven & Telscombe (P)	59
39	Enfield Town (P)	0–1	Hendon (P)	97
40	Hampton & Richmond Borough (P)	4–1	Harlow Town (N)	201

Tie	Home team (tier)	Score	Away team (tier)	Att.
41	Maidstone United (P)	6–0	Herne Bay (S)	417
42	Margate (P)	3–1	Faversham Town (S)	182
43	Ramsgate (S)	0–1	Tonbridge Angels (P)	86
44	Redbridge (N)	1–2	Cheshunt (N)	62
45	Thurrock (N)	0–4	AFC Hornchurch (P)	88
46	Walton & Hersham (S)	2–1	Merstham (S)	50
47	Walton Casuals (S)	0–2	Kingstonian (P)	48
48	Whyteleafe (S)	2–1	Leatherhead (P)	70

=== Third round ===
Tie	Home team (tier)	Score	Away team (tier)	Att.
49	Billericay Town (P)	1–0	AFC Hornchurch (P)	116
50	Cheshunt (N)	0–2	Grays Athletic (P)	81
51	Hendon (P)	1–0	Hampton & Richmond Borough (P)	87
52	Maidstone United (P)	0–4	Tonbridge Angels (P)	460
Tonbridge Angels removed from competition for fielding an ineligible player
53	Margate (P)	2–0	Burgess Hill Town (S)	169

Tie	Home team (tier)	Score	Away team (tier)	Att.
54	Walton & Hersham (S)	1–1	Kingstonian (P)	105
Kingstonian advance 2–1 on penalties
55	Whyteleafe (S)	6–2	East Grinstead Town (S)	90
56	Witham Town (P)	1–1	AFC Sudbury (N)	105
AFC Sudbury advance 4–3 on penalties

=== Quarterfinals ===
Tie	Home team (tier)	Score	Away team (tier)	Att.
57	AFC Sudbury (N)	0–3	Grays Athletic (P)	126
58	Billericay Town (P)	4–3	Whyteleafe (S)	107

Tie	Home team (tier)	Score	Away team (tier)	Att.
59	Hendon (P)	2–0	Maidstone United (P)	84
60	Margate (P)	2–1	Kingstonian (P)	164

=== Semifinals ===
Tie	Home team (tier)	Score	Away team (tier)	Att.
61	Grays Athletic (P)	2–1	Billericay Town (P)	211
62	Hendon (P)	2–1	Margate (P)	125

=== Final ===
15 April 2015 65	Grays Athletic (P)	2–3	Hendon (P)	Church Road, Whyteleafe
19:30	Fortnam-Tomlinson 42'; Cronin 90'	Isthmian League report	Da Costa 36' 73'; Ibe 40'	Attendance: 396

== See also ==
- Isthmian League
- 2014–15 Northern Premier League
- 2014–15 Southern League
