= Essex Senior Football League =

English football league

Essex Senior League
- Founded: 1971
- Country: England
- Number of clubs: 20
- Level on pyramid: Level 9
- Feeder to: Isthmian League
- Promotion to: Isthmian League Division One North
- Relegation to: Eastern Counties League Division One South/North
- Domestic cup(s): Essex Senior League Challenge Cup; Gordon Brasted Memorial Trophy
- Current champions: Little Oakley (2025–26)
- Most championships: Basildon United (5 titles)
- Website: www.essexseniorleague.co.uk
- Current: 2026–27 season

The Essex Senior Football League is an English men's football league. It contains clubs from the Essex FA, Hertfordshire FA, London FA, Middlesex FA and the Amateur Football Alliance. It is a feeder league to Division One North of the Isthmian League and has a single division which sits at Step 5 (or Level 9) of the National League System.

== Founder members ==
The Essex Senior League was formed in 1971 with nine founder members. The finishing positions for the 1971–72 season were as follows:

1	Witham Town
2	Billericay Town
3	Pegasus Athletic
4	Tiptree United
5	Saffron Walden Town
6	Basildon United
7	Heybridge Swifts
8	Southend United 'A'
9	Stansted

== Promotion and relegation ==
The Essex Senior League states that a club must finish in the top 3 to be considered for promotion to the Isthmian League Division One North. However the process is governed by the FA Leagues Committee who regulate relegations and promotions throughout the National League System. As of the 2014–15 season FA rules for Step 5 divisions such as the Essex Senior League stipulate that the champions should be offered the first chance of promotion. If the champions do not wish to be promoted or are not able to meet the entry requirements for promotion then the 2nd or 3rd placed team may be considered for promotion. Under normal circumstances, only one club can be promoted from a Step 5 league (e.g., the Essex Senior League) to a Step 4 league (e.g., the Isthmian League Division One).

In exchange for the promoted club, the Essex Senior League would typically receive a relegated club from a Step 4 league. Relegated clubs of Step 4 leagues are allocated an appropriate league based on their geographical locations. Thus the Essex Senior League is most likely to receive one of the relegated clubs from the Isthmian League Division One North.

There was no relegation from the Essex Senior League into a lower league since there was no Step 6 equivalent to the ESL until the 2017–18 season. Leagues including the Essex Olympian League (Step 7) sometimes acted as a feeder league to the Essex Senior League but promotion and relegation between the two leagues was not automatic. A Step 6 division for Essex and East Anglia was announced in October 2017 to solve the relegation problem. Since 2018–19, the Eastern Counties League controls this new division.

== Current Essex Senior League members ==
- Barking
- Basildon United
- Benfleet
- Clapton Community
- Frenford
- Great Wakering Rovers
- Hackney Wick
- Halstead Town
- Harwich & Parkeston
- Heybridge Swifts
- Hullbridge Sports
- Hutton
- Ilford
- Romford
- Saffron Walden Town
- Soul Tower Hamlets
- Sporting Bengal United
- West Essex
- White Ensign
- Woodford Town
Locations of the Essex Senior League clubs

== Champions, runners up and third place finishers ==
Season	Winner	Runners-up	Third place
1971–72	Witham Town	Billericay Town	Pegasus Athletic
1972–73	Billericay Town	Basildon United	Stansted
1973–74	Saffron Walden Town	Billericay Town	Coggeshall Town
1974–75	Billericay Town	Basildon United	Coggeshall Town
1975–76	Billericay Town	Tiptree United	Basildon United
1976–77	Basildon United	Brentwood	Billericay Town
1977–78	Basildon United	Tiptree United	Ford United
1978–79	Basildon United	Canvey Island	Eton Manor
1979–80	Basildon United	Wivenhoe Town	Canvey Island
1980–81	Bowers United	Heybridge Swifts	Wivenhoe Town
1981–82	Heybridge Swifts	Wivenhoe Town	Brentwood
1982–83	Heybridge Swifts	Stansted	Halstead Town
1983–84	Heybridge Swifts	Bowers United	Witham Town
1984–85	Maldon Town	Witham Town	Stansted
1985–86	Witham Town	Wivenhoe Town	Ford United
1986–87	Canvey Island	Witham Town	Purfleet
1987–88	Purfleet	Brentwood	Halstead Town
1988–89	Brightlingsea United	East Thurrock United	Ford United
1989–90	Brightlingsea United	Woodford Town	East Thurrock United
1990–91	Southend Manor	Brentwood	Burnham Ramblers
1991–92	Ford United	Brentwood	East Thurrock United
1992–93	Canvey Island	Sawbridgeworth Town	Bowers United
1993–94	Basildon United	Ford United	Canvey Island
1994–95	Great Wakering Rovers	Sawbridgeworth Town	Romford
1995–96	Romford	Great Wakering Rovers	Concord Rangers
1996–97	Ford United	Great Wakering Rovers	Concord Rangers
1997–98	Concord Rangers	Basildon United	Bowers United
1998–99	Bowers United	Great Wakering Rovers	Saffron Walden Town
1999–2000	Saffron Walden Town	Southend Manor	Burnham Ramblers
2000–01	Brentwood	Saffron Walden Town	Barkingside
2001–02	Leyton	Enfield Town	Burnham Ramblers
2002–03	Enfield Town	Concord Rangers	Ilford
2003–04	Concord Rangers	Ilford	Sawbridgeworth Town
2004–05	Enfield Town	Burnham Ramblers	Waltham Abbey
2005–06	A.F.C. Hornchurch	Waltham Abbey	Tilbury
2006–07	Brentwood Town	Romford	Barkingside
2007–08	Concord Rangers	Enfield 1893	Barkingside
2008–09	Romford	Enfield 1893	Takeley
2009–10	Stansted	Witham Town	Burnham Ramblers
2010–11	Enfield 1893	Stansted	Witham Town
2011–12	Witham Town	Southend Manor	Takeley
2012–13	Burnham Ramblers	Barkingside	Takeley
2013–14	Great Wakering Rovers	Haringey Borough	Enfield 1893
2014–15	Haringey Borough	Bowers & Pitsea	Barking
2015–16	Bowers & Pitsea	Basildon United	FC Romania
2016–17	Barking	Clapton	FC Romania
2017–18	Great Wakering Rovers	Basildon United	FC Romania
2018–19	Hullbridge Sports	Stansted	Walthamstow
2019–20	No champions; season abandoned due to coronavirus pandemic		
2020–21	No champions; season abandoned due to pandemic-related lockdowns		
2021–22	Walthamstow	Saffron Walden Town	Redbridge
2022–23	Enfield	Redbridge	Woodford Town
2023–24	Tilbury	Woodford Town	Romford
2024–25	Stanway Rovers	Takeley	Woodford Town
2025–26	Little Oakley	Soul Tower Hamlets	Great Wakering Rovers

=== League winners records ===
- 5 times – Basildon United
- 3 times – Billericay Town, Bowers & Pitsea, Concord Rangers, Great Wakering Rovers, Heybridge Swifts, Witham Town
- 2 times – Brentwood Town, Brightlingsea United, Canvey Island, Enfield, Enfield Town, Ford United, Romford, Saffron Walden Town
- 1 time – AFC Hornchurch, Barking, Burnham Ramblers, Haringey Borough, Hullbridge Sports, Leyton, Little Oakley, Maldon Town, Purfleet, Stansted, Stanway Rovers, Southend Manor, Tilbury, Walthamstow

== Errington Challenge Cup ==
The Essex Senior League Challenge Cup is a knock-out tournament competed for by teams in the Essex Senior Football League. As of the 2017–18 season the competition is referred to as the Errington Challenge Cup in recognition of the league's treasurer Margaret Errington who held the post for 26 years before her death in 2016. Brentwood Town and Basildon United hold the record jointly for the most cup wins, each lifting the trophy four times (Brentwood Town in 1975–76, 1978–79, 1990–91, 2006–07, Basildon United in 1977–78, 1993–94, 1997–98, 2015–16).

=== Final results ===
Season	Winner	Score	Runners-up
1972–73	Billericay Town	2–1	Saffron Walden Town
1973–74	No competition played		
1974–75	Colchester United 'A'	3–1	Billericay Town
1975–76	Brentwood	3–0	Basildon United
1976–77	Billericay Town	1–0	Bowers United
1977–78	Basildon United	3–0	Bowers United
1978–79	Brentwood	2–0	Brightlingsea United
1979–80	Canvey Island	1–1, 0–0, 2–0	Basildon United
1980–81	Witham Town	4–2	Sawbridgeworth Town
1981–82	Bowers United	2–0	Halstead Town
1982–83	Heybridge Swifts	4–1	Bowers United
1983–84	Stansted	1–0	Brentwood
1984–85	Chelmsford City Reserves	2–0	Maldon Town
1985–86	Ford United	1–0	Coggeshall Town
1986–87	Purfleet	2–0	Burnham Ramblers
1987–88	Purfleet	2–1	Canvey Island
1988–89	East Thurrock United	3–2	Ford United
1989–90	Southend Manor	2–0	Burnham Ramblers
1990–91	Brentwood	2–0	Southend Manor
1991–92	East Thurrock United	2–0	Basildon United
1992–93	Canvey Island	3–1	Sawbridgeworth Town
1993–94	Basildon United	3–0	Sawbridgeworth Town
1994–95	Sawbridgeworth Town	2–0	Stansted
1995–96	Romford	2–0	Southend Manor
1996–97	Concord Rangers	1–0	Ford United
1997–98	Basildon United	1–0	Burnham Ramblers
1998–99	Bowers United	2–0	Great Wakering Rovers
1999-00	Saffron Walden Town	2–1	Southend Manor
2000–01	Southend Manor	2–1	Sawbridgeworth Town
2001–02	Enfield Town	1–1 (4–2 penalties)	Leyton
2002–03	Ilford	1–0	Sawbridgeworth Town
2003–04	Enfield Town	3–2	Sawbridgeworth Town
2004–05	Waltham Abbey	4–1	Enfield Town
2005–06	AFC Hornchurch	2–0	Brentwood Town
2006–07	Brentwood Town	1–1 (5–4 penalties)	Romford
2007–08	Eton Manor	3–2	Concord Rangers
2008–09	Barkingside	2–0	Burnham Ramblers
2009–10	Bethnal Green United	4–1	Burnham Ramblers
2010–11	Stansted	3–0	Enfield 1893
2011–12	Witham Town	2–1	Burnham Ramblers
2012–13	Barkingside	9–1	Bowers & Pitsea
2013–14	Great Wakering Rovers	1–0	Sporting Bengal United
2014–15	Bowers & Pitsea	7–1	Clapton
2015–16	Basildon United	3–0	FC Romania
2016–17	Takeley	1–0	Sawbridgeworth Town
2017–18	Great Wakering Rovers	1–0	Sawbridgeworth Town
2018–19	Stansted	1–0	West Essex
2019–20	Not completed due to coronavirus pandemic		
2020–21	Not played due to coronavirus pandemic		
2021–22	Enfield	3–2	Cockfosters
2022–23	Barking	1–1 (5–4 penalties)	Redbridge
2023–24	Stanway Rovers	4–0	Romford
2024–25	Great Wakering Rovers	1–1 (3–1 penalties)	Little Oakley

== League and Cup double ==
On 14 occasions a team has won both the Essex Senior League and the Essex Senior League Challenge Cup in the same season. They are:

- 1972–73 – Billericay Town
- 1977–78 – Basildon United
- 1982–83 – Heybridge Swifts
- 1987–88 – Purfleet
- 1992–93 – Canvey Island
- 1993–94 – Basildon United
- 1995–96 – Romford
- 1998–99 – Bowers United
- 1999–00 – Saffron Walden Town
- 2005–06 – AFC Hornchurch
- 2006–07 – Brentwood Town
- 2011–12 – Witham Town
- 2013–14 – Great Wakering Rovers
- 2017–18 – Great Wakering Rovers

== Former members ==
- AFC Hornchurch
- Barkingside
- Basildon United
- Beaumont Athletic
- Billericay Town
- Bowers & Pitsea
- Brentwood Town
- Brightlingsea United
- Burnham Ramblers
- Bury Academy
- Canvey Island
- Chelmsford City reserves
- Clapton
- Cockfosters
- Colchester United 'A'
- Concord Rangers
- East Ham United
- East Thurrock United
- Enfield
- Enfield Town
- Eton Manor
- FC Romania
- Hackney Wick
- Hadley
- Haringey Borough
- Hashtag United
- Heybridge Swifts
- Hoddesdon Town
- Leyton
- Leyton Athletic
- London APSA
- Maldon Town
- Pegasus Athletic
- Purfleet
- Redbridge
- Sawbridgeworth Town
- Southend Manor
- Southend United 'A'
- St Margaretsbury
- Stambridge
- Stansted
- Tiptree United
- Tower Hamlets
- Waltham Abbey
- Walthamstow
- Witham Town
- Wivenhoe Town
- Woodford Town
- Woodford Town reserves

== Notable former Essex Senior League players ==
Several Essex Senior League players have also played for Football League or Premier League teams:

- Jimmy Greaves – Played for Brentwood Town after playing for West Ham United, Tottenham Hotspur, AC Milan, Chelsea and England.
- Alan Brazil – Played for Stambridge after Queens Park Rangers and other teams including Manchester United and Scotland.
- Kerry Dixon – Played in the Essex Senior League for Basildon after playing for other teams including Chelsea and England.
- Michael Kightly – left Basildon United to join Southend United circa 2003, playing for Burnley as of April 2016.
- Dwight Gayle – left Stansted to play for Dagenham & Redbridge, Peterborough United and Crystal Palace.
- Trevor Putney – left Brentwood to join Ipswich Town in 1980, also played for Norwich City, and Middlesbrough.
- Stuart Wardley – left Saffron Walden Town to join Queens Park Rangers in 1999.
- Steve Tilson – left Witham Town to join Southend United in 1989.
- Gary Hart – left Stansted for £1,000 and a set of kit to join Brighton & Hove Albion in 1998.
- Ben Barnett – left Southend Manor to briefly join Leyton Orient in 2000.
- John Warner – left Burnham Ramblers to join Colchester United in 1988.
- Scott Forbes – left Saffron Walden Town to join Southend United in 2000.
