= Scott Forbes (disambiguation) =

Scott Forbes was an actor.

Scott Forbes may also refer to:

- Scott Forbes (footballer)
- Scott Forbes (baseball), American baseball coach and player
- Scott Forbes (basketball), played for Bahamas national basketball team
- Scott Forbes, founder of Studio One (nightclub)
