= Scott Forbes (footballer) =

English footballer (born 1976)

Personal information
- Full name: Scott Forbes
- Date of birth: 22 October 1976 (age 50)
- Place of birth: Canewdon, England
- Position: Midfielder

Senior career*
Years	Team	Apps	(Gls)
–2000	Saffron Walden Town		
2000–2002	Southend United	47	(3)
2002–2004	Canvey Island		
2003	→ Bishop's Stortford (loan)		
2003	→ Heybridge Swifts (loan)		
2004	Bishop's Stortford	14	(0)
2004	→ Windsor & Eton (loan)		
2004–2005	Heybridge Swifts		
- * Club domestic league appearances and goals

Scott Forbes (born 22 October 1976) is an English semi-professional footballer who plays as a midfielder. He played in the Football League with Southend United, before dropping into non-League football.

== Playing career ==
Forbes started his career with Essex Senior League side Saffron Walden Town, before joining Southend United in 2000. He spent the pre-season on trial with Canvey Island before joining Southend. Forbes made his debut for Southend, replacing Scott Houghton as a substitute in the 73rd minute in a Third Division match against Brighton & Hove Albion in the 2–1 win on 12 August 2000 at Roots Hall. His first goal for Southend United was on 4 November, when they defeated Macclesfield Town 3–1 at home in the Third Division. Forbes scored in injury time with a shot from the edge of the penalty area. He made a total of 59 appearances, scoring four goals in all competitions for Southend over two seasons, after an injury ravaged season. Forbes struggled with injuries to his thigh, hamstring and ankle. "First I had trouble with my thigh, then it was my ankle, my hamstring and then my ankle again. It's just been one injury nightmare after another," Forbes admitted.

After being released at the end of the 2001–02 season, Forbes signed for Isthmian League Premier Division club Canvey Island in July 2002. He went out on loan to Bishop's Stortford, February 2002. He made his debut against Grays Athletic at home in a 3–1 defeat on 15 February. In July 2003, Forbes was transfer listed by Canvey. He was loaned out again in October to Heybridge Swifts. Forbes joined Bishop's Stortford on a permanent basis in the summer of 2004 making 14 appearances, before being loaned out to Windsor & Eton a few months after signing.

He re-signed for Heybridge Swifts on a permanent basis in October 2004, before leaving in April 2005 by mutual consent. Heybridge manager, Brian Statham explained Forbes' departure saying; "Scott felt that at times he was being unfairly criticised by the management and had not been given a fair crack of the whip. We felt that Scott hadn't been treated any differently to anyone else, but felt that Scott would not be part of the team that we are trying to build, and so a mutual parting of the ways was agreed."

Scott started 2011–12 with Essex Senior League side Stansted as player/assistant manager before moving to rivals Takeley.

== Youth development ==
Prior to playing, Forbes coached youngsters in Bishop's Stortford for Soccer Development – an organisation set up and run by his former manager Tim Moylette (Southend) – before running his own football courses in Dunmow. Scott insists he doesn't want to create 'robots' who are trained to hoof a 30-yard pass, but rather players with a good touch and a passing mind. Scott's approach and attitude endeared him to young players and parents alike. "It's not just a place to have a kick about – it's not about winning or losing, it's about giving the children a positive environment to develop their skills."
