= Enfield F.C. =

Association football club in England

Coordinates: 51°52′21″N 0°11′31″E

Enfield
- Full name: Enfield Football Club
- Nickname: The E's
- Founded: 1893; 133 years ago
- Ground: Hertingfordbury Park, Hertford
- Capacity: 6,500 (200 seated)
- Chairman: Stephen Whittington
- Manager: Alex Salmon
- League: Spartan South Midlands League Premier Division
- 2025–26: Southern League Division One Central, 19th of 22 (relegated)
- Website: enfieldfootballclub.co.uk
Home colours	Away colours	Third colours

Enfield Football Club is an English football club that is currently a member of the Spartan South Midlands League Premier Division. The club plays its home matches at Hertingfordbury Park in Hertford. Traditionally based in Enfield, Greater London, the club was, between the 1960s and 1980s, one of the most successful non-league clubs in England, winning the FA Amateur Cup, FA Trophy and Football Conference twice. The club, however, did not manage to gain election to the Football League. Following financial struggles and the sale of their Southbury Road stadium, the club declined, eventually folding and reforming in 2007 as Enfield 1893 Football Club, dropping the 1893 suffix in 2019.

== History ==
=== Early years ===
John Bruce Skinner founded Enfield Football Club in August 1893 as Enfield Spartans, and the club spent its initial season playing friendlies. The start of the 1894–95 season saw the club play league football for the first time when it joined the Tottenham & District Junior Alliance League. The club made the move to the larger Tucker's Field and joined the North Middlesex League in 1896. In 1900, the club dropped the Spartans from the end of its name – this name is now used by a local Youth Football Club – and also made the move to Cherry Orchard Lane. This picked things up at the club and, in the 1901–02 and 1902–03 seasons, it won back-to-back league titles and so attained "senior" status. The club joined the London League Division Two in 1903. It won the title in 1911 and so gained promotion to the Premier Division. For most of the next fifty years, the club played in the Athenian League.

After the First World War, Enfield disbanded. Members of Grange Park FC, which had been a local junior club before the war, held a meeting at the Bell Inn, Baker Street, Enfield, in May 1919, with a view to stepping up to senior football and taking on the mantle of Enfield. The decision to become the "new" Enfield was taken the next month.

=== Isthmian League years ===
They enjoyed little success until the arrival of Thomas Lawrence in the early 1960s. Lawrence was a charismatic centre forward who attracted much stronger players to the club. His career as a player was cut short when he fractured his skull playing for Great Britain in an Olympic Games qualifier. Successful as a manager, he did even better later in business. Lawrence's arrival was the origin of the success of Enfield, that lasted thirty years. It was not until 1961–62 that the club won the Athenian League title for the first time, and a second successive title in 1962–63 won them entry to the Isthmian League. They won seven further league titles and were one of the first two Isthmian League clubs to join the Alliance Premier League in 1981. During their period in the Isthmian League they made their first appearance in the FA Amateur Cup Final. After taking an early lead their goalkeeper, Malcolm Mitchell broke his arm, and Roy Thomas, a winger, went into goal. No substitutes were allowed and Crook Town won 2–1.

=== Alliance/Conference years ===
During the early 1980s, Enfield was among the strongest Conference sides, winning the title in 1982–83 and 1985–86, and the FA Trophy in 1981–82 and 1987–88. The 1980–81 FA Cup also saw them reach the fourth round for the first time in their history. They drew 1–1 against Barnsley but lost 3–0 in the replay.

They won their most recent Conference title in the final season of the re-election system in 1985–86, in which the Football League members had to vote on whether or not to replace one of the bottom four teams in the Fourth Division with the champions of the highest non-league division. However, in the ballot which followed Enfield received just 7.5 votes, while the four league sides applying to retain membership received between 61 and 64 votes.

Enfield's form slipped and they were relegated to the Isthmian League in 1990. Despite a run of seven consecutive top-three finishes they remained in that league, being denied promotion after winning the title in 1995 because the Football Conference were not satisfied with the club's financial credentials.

=== After Southbury Road ===
In 1999, the club sold its Southbury Road stadium, and began ground sharing with several nearby clubs. Eventually, the board decided on a long term ground share with Boreham Wood, ten miles away. Fearing that the club would never return to its home borough and the team would continue to struggle near the foot of the league, a group of fans set up a supporters' trust. The trust hoped to become involved in the running of Enfield FC and to bring about the club's return to play in the Borough of Enfield. For months, their attempts to help were rebuffed by chairman Tony Lazarou. In February 2001, a deal to transfer control of the club to the Trust was proposed, but Lazarou stalled on the deal for several months and by the beginning of June no progress had been made.

When the club sold Southbury Road, £750,000 from the sale had been placed into an escrow account for the use by the club for building a new ground. In 2001, chairman Lazarou asked Enfield Council to hand the money over to him even though he had not identified a site for a new ground; after Lazarou threatened legal action, the council handed over the money. After this, a group of supporters formed their own club, Enfield Town, based in Brimsdown.

After these events, Enfield struggled in the Isthmian League Premier Division, and was relegated in 2003. The 2003–04 season was even worse, finishing bottom of Isthmian League Division One North with only 22 points from 46 games. Enfield were effectively double relegated in 2004, as the FA decided to place them in the Second Division of the Isthmian League for 2004–05, despite the creation of the Conference North and South pushing the Isthmian League further down the pyramid. By this point, Enfield had moved to Wodson Park, Ware, and came second in the Isthmian League Second Division in 2005, winning promotion to the Southern Football League Division One East.

Lazarou owed the club a vast amount of money from the sale of the ground at Southbury Road. A Football Association hearing stated he should repay to the club a sum believed to be in the region of £200,000.

During the close season at the end of the 2006–07 season, Enfield had no choice but to liquidate due to the debts owed to HMRC by former chairman Lazarou, forcing the club to resign from the Isthmian League Division One North. Enfield Town approached Enfield proposing a merger, but the Enfield FC officials opted to remain separate and re-formed the club as Enfield 1893.

=== Reformed club ===
The new club joined the Essex Senior League and were runners-up in their first season. After finishing as runners-up again in 2008–09, they were league champions in 2010–11. However, they were not promoted as their ground failed the grading criteria. The club dropped the 1893 suffix from their name in 2019, reverting to the original club's name. In the 2022–23 season, the club won the Essex Senior League for the second time, this time earning promotion as well.

== Ground ==
Enfield played at Southbury Road between 1936 and 1999, when the ground was sold off for development. Groundshares followed at Boreham Wood and Ware before the original club became defunct in 2007. The reformed club groundshared with Broxbourne Borough V&E from the start of the 2009–10 season, at Goffs Lane, This groundshare lasted for one year, with the club finally moving back to the borough of Enfield in 2010, after merging with Brimsdown Rovers and moving into their Goldsdown Road stadium, which they shared with Enfield Town for the 2010–11 season, prior to Town moving out at the end of the season. A new groundshare was entered with Harlow Town in 2014, before moving to share with Bishop's Stortford in 2019. A new groundshare began with Hertford Town in 2024.

== Records ==
- Best FA Cup performance: Fourth round, 1980–81 (replay)
- Best FA Trophy performance: Champions, 1981–82, 1987–88
- Best FA Vase performance: Fifth round, 2004–05
- Best FA Amateur Cup performance: Champions, 1966–67, 1969–70

== Honours ==
- FA Amateur Cup
  - Winners 1966–67, 1969–70
- European Amateur Cup Winners Cup
  - Winners 1970–71
- FA Trophy
  - Winners 1981–82, 1987–88
- Football Conference
  - Champions 1982–83, 1985–86
- Isthmian League
  - Champions 1967–68, 1968–69, 1969–70, 1975–76, 1976–77, 1977–78, 1979–80, 1994–95
- Athenian League
  - Champions 1961–62, 1962–63
- Essex Senior League
  - Champions 2010–11, 2022–23
- London Senior Cup
  - Winners 1934–35, 1960–61, 1966–67, 1971–72, 1972–73, 1975–76
- Middlesex Senior Cup
  - Winners 1913–14, 1946–47, 1961–62, 1965–66, 1968–69, 1969–70, 1970–71, 1977–78, 1978–79, 1979–80, 1980–81, 1988–89, 1990–91, 1997–98
- Middlesex Charity Cup
  - Winners 1958–59, 1960–61, 1961–62 (shared)

== See also ==
- Enfield F.C. players
- Enfield F.C. managers
