= Burnham Ramblers F.C. =

Association football club in England

Coordinates: 51°38′7.760″N 0°48′10.480″E

Burnham Ramblers
- Full name: Burnham Ramblers Football Club
- Nickname: The Ramblers
- Founded: 1900
- Ground: Leslie Field, Burnham-on-Crouch
- Capacity: 2,000 (156 seated)
- Chairman: Paul Howard
- Manager: Stuart Zanone
- League: Eastern Counties League Division One South
- 2025–26: Eastern Counties League Division One South, 11th of 21
Home colours	Away colours

Burnham Ramblers Football Club is a football club based in Burnham-on-Crouch, Essex, England. They are currently members of the Eastern Counties League Division One South and play at Leslie Field.

== History ==
The club was established in 1900. They played in the North Essex League and the South East Essex League, as well as the Mid-Essex League. They also briefly played in the Premier Division of the South Essex League from 1933 until 1937. In the Mid-Essex League the club won Division One in 1927–28 and the Premier Division in 1954–55 and 1962–63, before becoming founder members of the Essex Olympian League in 1966. They were league champions in its first season and went on to finish as runners-up the following season.

In 1985 Burnham moved up to the Essex Senior League. They won the Harry Fisher Trophy in 1996–97 with a 2–1 win against Stansted in the final. In 1999–2000 they finished third, missing out on the title on goal difference. They were runners-up in 2004–05, also winning the Tolleshunt D'Arcy Cup, and won the Gordon Brasted Memorial Trophy in 2008–09, beating Enfield 1893 2–1 in the final. They won it again in 2010–11 with a 4–2 win over Eton Manor after extra time. In 2012–13 they won the league, earning promotion to Division One North of the Isthmian League; they also won the Gordon Brasted Memorial Trophy again with an 8–2 win against Enfield 1893. However, they finished bottom of the division in 2014–15 and were relegated back to the Essex Senior League. In 2017–18 the club finished second-from-bottom of the Essex Senior League and were relegated to the new Division One South of the Eastern Counties League.

In 2023–24 Burnham finished bottom of Division One South but were reprieved from relegation.

== Ground ==
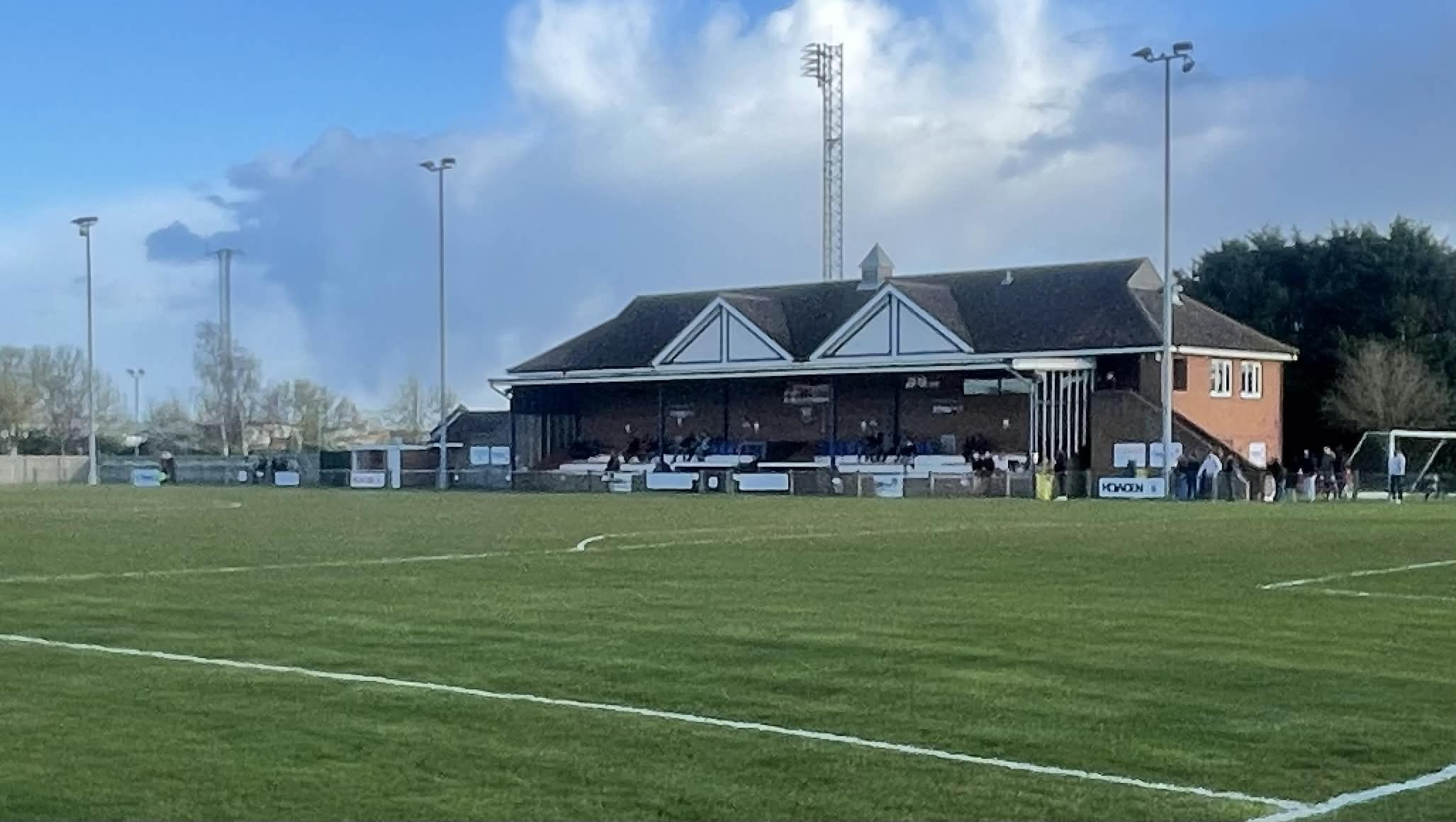
Main stand at Leslie Field

After their formation, the club used four different grounds before moving to Wick Road in 1927. A new stand was opened in 1962 with a friendly match against Arsenal. They relocated to Leslie Field in 1987, with the first match at the new ground being an FA Vase game against Pennant on 5 September. The ground was officially opened with a friendly match against Colchester United, which ended in a 3–3 draw. A seated stand was built backing onto the clubhouse, with a covered terrace on the other side of the pitch and an uncovered terrace behind one goal.

== Honours ==
- Essex Senior League
  - Champions 2012–13
  - Harry Fisher Cup winners 1996–97
  - Gordon Brasted Memorial Trophy 2008–09, 2010–11, 2012–13
- Essex Olympian League
  - Champions 1966–67
- Mid-Essex League
  - Champions 1927–28, 1954–55, 1962–63
  - Premier Division Cup winners 1955–56, 1961–62
  - Fred Brooks Memorial Trophy winners 1955–56, 1961–62
- Tolleshunt D'Arcy Cup
  - Winners 2004–05, 2009–10

== Records ==
- Best FA Cup performance: Second qualifying round, 2003–04, 2005–06
- Best FA Trophy performance: First qualifying round, 2013–14
- Best FA Vase performance: Fifth round, 1988–89
- Record attendance: 1,500 vs Arsenal, friendly match

== See also ==
- Burnham Ramblers F.C. players
- Burnham Ramblers F.C. managers
