= East Thurrock Community F.C. =

English football club

Coordinates: 51°31′20″N 0°27′42″E

East Thurrock Community
- Full name: East Thurrock Community Football Club
- Nickname: The Rocks
- Founded: 27 April 1969
- Ground: Rookery Hill, Corringham
- Capacity: 3,500
- Chairman: Jono Edwards
- League: Eastern Counties League Division One South
- 2025–26: Essex & Suffolk Border League Premier Division, 3rd of 15 (promoted)
Home colours

East Thurrock Community Football Club is a football club based in Corringham, Essex, England. East Thurrock United were founded in 1969 and gradually worked their way up the non-League pyramid, reaching the National League South in 2016. However, in 2023 the club was liquidated. Supporters then set up a successor club under the name East Thurrock Community. They are currently members of the Eastern Counties League Division One South and play at Rookery Hill.

== History ==
The club was founded on 27 April 1969 by a group of fans who felt that the area around Corringham and Stanford-le-Hope should have a senior non-league football club, following the successful Corringham Social Sunday league team. The new club played in the Southern Essex Combination for the 1969–70 season and finished third in the league, before joining the reserve section of the Greater London League in 1970. They went on to win the division at the first attempt. The league merged with the Metropolitan League at the end of the season to form the Metropolitan–London League, with East Thurrock remaining in the reserve division. After winning the division in 1971–72, they moved up to the senior divisions, joining Division Two. They also won this division at the first attempt and were promoted to Division One.

After the league merged with the Spartan League to form the London Spartan League in 1975, East Thurrock were placed in Division Two. They remained in Division Two until restructuring saw them moved into the Premier Division in 1978. In 1979 the club switched to the Essex Senior League. In 1988–89 they won the League Cup, a feat they repeated in 1991–92, a season that also saw them finish third in the league, earning promotion to Division Three of the Isthmian League. In 1999–2000 they were Division Three champions, earning promotion to Division Two. Two seasons later they were placed in Division One North upon league reorganisation, before being moved into the Eastern Division of the Southern League for the 2004–05 season as part of wider restructuring of the non-League pyramid. After finishing as Eastern Division runners-up in the first season, they were promoted and moved back to the Isthmian League, joining its Premier Division.

East Thurrock were relegated back to Division One North of the Isthmian League at the end of the 2007–08 season following a one-point deduction for fielding an ineligible player. They finished as runners-up in 2008–09, qualifying for the promotion play-offs, but lost 1–0 to Concord Rangers in the semi-finals. A fifth-place finish the 2009–10 saw the club qualify for the play-offs again, but they were again beaten 1–0 by Concord Rangers in the semi-finals. In 2010–11 the club won the division and were promoted to the Premier Division. In 2011–12 they reached the first round of the FA Cup for the first time in their history, losing 3–0 at home to Macclesfield Town. The following season saw them finish fifth in the Isthmian League Premier Division, qualifying for the play-offs. However, they lost 1–0 to Lowestoft Town in the semi-finals.

In 2014–15 East Thurrock reached the first round of the FA Cup again, this time losing 2–0 at Hartlepool United. In the following season they finished third in the Premier Division, again qualifying for the play-offs. The club beat Tonbridge Angels 2–0 in the semi-finals and Dulwich Hamlet 3–1 in the final in front of a record crowd of 1,661, resulting in promotion to the National League South. After three seasons in the sixth tier, the club finished second-from-bottom of the National League South in 2018–19, and were relegated back to the Isthmian League's Premier Division in a season that also saw them win the Essex Senior Cup for the first time in their history, defeating Chelmsford City 3–1 in the final.

In September 2023 the club were placed into liquidation. A phoenix club was subsequently established under the name East Thurrock Community. The new club who joined the Premier Division of the Essex & Suffolk Border League for the 2024–25 season. In 2025–26 they finished third in the Premier Division and were promoted to Division One South of the Eastern Counties League.

== Ground ==
During the club's first season as members of the Southern Essex Combination, in 1969–70, home matches were played at Corringham Recreation Ground. They subsequently moved to the Billet Ground in Stanford-Le-Hope, before ground-sharing with nearby Grays Athletic during the 1973–74 season in order to be granted senior status by the Essex County Football Association, before returning to the Billet Ground after upgrading works had taken place.

In 1977 the club left the Billet Ground again, groundsharing at Tilbury until 1982, when they moved to the Thames Board Mill Ground. They remained at the new ground for two years. Still seeking their own ground, the club bought land on the edge of Corringham Marshes and began building the Rookery Ground, which opened in 1984. The site had previously been the home ground of Lathol Athletic. Temporary seating was installed in 1989 prior to an FA Vase fifth round match against Bashley. A 160-seat main stand was erected, with a covered terrace built on the other side of the pitch, together with two covered areas behind one goal. In 2016 one covered terrace was converted into a 250-seat stand. The ground currently has a capacity of 3,000.

The reformed club play at the Wyldecrest Sports Country Club in Corringham, but plan to return to Rookery Hill for the 2026–27 season.

== Honours ==
- Isthmian League
  - Division One North champions 2010–11
  - Division Three champions 1999–2000
- Essex Senior Cup
  - Winners 2018–19
- Metropolitan–London League
  - Division Two champions 1972–73
  - Reserve Division champions 1971–72
- Greater London League
  - Reserve Division champions 1970–71
- Essex Senior League
  - League Cup winners 1988–89, 1991–92
- East Anglian Cup
  - Winners 2002–03

== Records ==
- Best FA Cup performance: First round, 2011–12, 2014–15
- Best FA Trophy performance: Third round, 2017–18
- Best FA Vase performance: Fifth round, 1988–89
- Record attendance: 1,661 vs Dulwich Hamlet, Isthmian League Premier Division play-off final, 2016
- Biggest win: 7–0 vs Coggeshall Town, Essex Senior League, 1984
- Heaviest defeat: 9–0 vs Eton Manor, Essex Senior League, 1982
- Most appearances: Glen Case, over 600
- Most goals: Sam Higgins, 275
- Record transfer fee received: £20,000 from Leyton Orient for Greg Berry, 1990

== See also ==
- East Thurrock United F.C. players
