= Brentwood Town F.C. =

Association football club in England

Coordinates: 51°38′2″N 0°18′2″E

Brentwood Town
- Full name: Brentwood Town Football Club
- Nickname: The Blues
- Founded: 1954
- Ground: Brentwood Centre Arena, Brentwood
- Capacity: 1,500
- Chairman: Jez Dickinson
- Manager: Brett Munyard
- League: Isthmian League Premier Division
- 2025–26: Isthmian League Premier Division, 5th of 22
- Website: brentwoodtownfc.co.uk
Home colours	Away colours

Brentwood Town Football Club is a football club based in Brentwood, Essex, England. They are currently members of the Isthmian League Premier Division and play at the Brentwood Centre Arena.

== History ==
A Brentwood Football Club was established in the 19th century, and played in the FA Cup several times, reaching the quarter-finals in 1885–86, when they were beaten 3–1 by eventual winners Blackburn Rovers. They were also briefly members of Division One of the South Essex League for the 1896–97 season, but left after finishing bottom of the division. The club were later replaced as the town's main club by amateur club Brentwood & Warley. Brentwood & Warley joined Division One A of the South Essex League in 1921 and were runners-up in their first season in the league. They finished bottom of Division One in 1926–27, but were runners-up the following season, after which they joined Division One East of the Spartan League.

League reorganisation at the end of the 1928–29 season saw Brentwood & Warley placed in the Premier Division, where they remained until leaving the league at the end of the 1933–34 season. They rejoined the league in 1948, and were runners-up in 1948–49. In 1951 they were founder members of the Delphian League and were its inaugural champions. The club went on to win the league again in 1958–59 and 1959–60. In 1963 they joined Division Two of the Athenian League in 1963 after the Delphian League was disbanded.

In 1965 the club turned professional and became Brentwood Town. Playing at the Hive on Ongar Road, the renamed club left the amateur Athenian League to join the Metropolitan League. After two third-place finishes and a League Cup win in 1966–67, the club moved up to Division One of the Southern League in 1967. In 1968–69 they won Division One, and were promoted to the Premier Division. In the same season the club also reached the second round of the FA Cup, where they lost 10–1 at Southend United. The following season the club reached the third round of the cup; they beat Football League club Reading 1–0 in the first round, before defeating Hendon 2–0 in the second round. The third round saw them drawn at home against Northampton Town, with a record crowd of over 4,000 seeing the club lose 1–0. In the league the club briefly topped the table in September, and eventually finished ninth. However, at the end of the season the club directors decided to merge the club with Chelmsford City. The club's ground was sold for housing.

=== Modern club ===
After Brentwood Town were dissolved, Manor Athletic changed their name to Brentwood Athletic. Manor Athletic had been established in 1954, and joined the Essex Olympian League in 1967, winning the League Cup in their first season. In 1974 the club was renamed again, becoming simply Brentwood, and joined the Essex Senior League. They went on to win the League Cup in 1975–76, 1978–79, 1990–91

In 2000–01 the club won their first Essex Senior League title, although they finished third from bottom of the league the following season. In 2004 the club adopted its current name. After winning the Essex Senior League for the second time in 2006–07, and also winning the League Cup, the club was promoted to Division One North of the Isthmian League. In 2008–09 they finished third and qualified for the promotion play-offs, but lost 4–1 at home to Waltham Abbey. In 2010–11 the club finished fifth and qualified for the play-offs again. After defeating Needham Market 3–1 in the semi-finals, they lost 3–2 to Wingate & Finchley in the final. They qualified for the play-offs again after a fourth-place finish in 2014–15, and after beating AFC Sudbury on penalties in the semi-final, they defeated Thurrock 5–0 in the final to earn promotion to the Premier Division. However, the following season saw them finish in the relegation zone, resulting in relegation back to Division One North.

In 2021–22 Brentwood finished third in the North Division. In the promotion play-offs they defeated Stowmarket Town 2–1 in the semi-finals, before losing on penalties to Canvey Island in the final. They qualified for the play-offs again in 2023–24 with a fifth placed-finish. After beating Bury Town 3–1 in the semi-finals, the club lost the final on penalties again, this time to Bowers & Pitsea. In 2024–25 season they were North Division champions, earning promotion to the Premier Division. The club finished fifth in the Premier Division in 2025–26, going on to beat Aveley 4–1 in the play-off semi-finals, before losing 2–1 (after extra time) to Billericay Town in the final.

== Ground ==
Manor Athletic played at King George's Playing Fields until moving to Larkin's Playing Field in 1957. In 1992 they were required to leave the ground in order to maintain senior status, and groundshared at East Thurrock United's Rookery Hill. The following year they moved to the Brentwood Centre, with the opening match played on 9 October 1993. Initially the only spectator facilities was a covered area adjacent to the clubhouse; seats were later installed in one half of the stand. Floodlights were installed in 1999. A record attendance was set in August 2004 when a crowd of 472 watched a friendly match against a West Ham United XI. This was beaten in April 2022 when 897 watched the play-off semi-final match against Stowmarket Town. A new record of 1,323 was set in December 2024 for an FA Trophy match against Southend United. This was bettered when 1,467 spectators attended a 21 April 2025 title-deciding match against Basildon United. Another new record was set on 20 September 2025 when 1,574 watched an Isthmian League Premier Division match against local rivals Billericay Town.

== Coaching staff ==
Role	Name
Manager	Brett Munyard
Assistant Manager	
Attacking Coach	
Goalkeeping Coach	
Coach	
Physiotherapist	
Kit Manager	
Source: Brentwood Town FC

== List of managers ==
Years	Name
1972–1976	(England) David Emerick
1978–1999	(England) Derrick Stittle
1999–2004	(England) Paul Delea
2004–2005	(England) Andy Macdonald
2005–2006	(England) Tony Myers
2006–2008	(England) Steve Witherspoon
2008–2009	(Wales) Carl Griffiths
2009–2011	(England) Les Whitton
2011–2013	(England) Steve Witherspoon
2013	(England) Les Whitton
2013–2015	(England) Danny Dafter & Adam Flanagan
2015	(England) Danny Dafter
2015	(England) Dean Holdsworth
2015	(England) George Borg
2015–2016	(England) Mike Flanagan
2016–2017	(England) Tony Ievoli
2017–2019	(England) Craig Shipman
2019–2020	(England) Ryan O'Rawe
2020–2021	(England) Adam Flanagan
2021–2023	(England) Rod Stringer
2023–2023	(England) Craig Shipman
2023–2026	(Northern Ireland) Keith Rowland

== Honours ==
- Isthmian League
  - North Division champions 2024–25
- Essex Senior League
  - Champions 2000–01, 2006–07
  - League Cup winners 1975–76, 1978–79, 1990–91, 2006–07
- Gordon Brasted Memorial Trophy
  - Winners 2006–07
- Harry Fisher Memorial Trophy
  - Winners 1995–96
- Essex Olympian League
  - League Cup Winners 1967–68

== Records ==
- Best FA Cup performance: Third round, 1969–70
- Best FA Trophy performance: Third round, 2024–25
- Best FA Vase performance: First round, 2004–05, 2006–07
- Record attendance:
  - Original club: 4,000 vs Northampton Town, FA Cup third round, 12 January 1970
  - Modern club: 1,574 vs Billericay Town, Isthmian League Premier Division, 20 September 2025

== See also ==
- Brentwood Town F.C. players
- Brentwood Town F.C. managers
