= Basildon United F.C. =

Association football club in England

Coordinates: 51°35′10″N 0°28′40″E

Basildon United
- Full name: Basildon United Football Club
- Nickname: The Bees
- Founded: 1955 (as Armada Sports)
- Ground: Gardiners Close, Basildon
- Capacity: 2,000 (400 seated)
- Chairman: Dave Maxwell
- Manager: Ben Coleman
- League: Essex Senior League
- 2025–26: Essex Senior League, 15th of 20
- Website: basildonunited.co.uk
Home colours	Away colours

Basildon United Football Club is a football club based in Basildon, Essex. They are currently members of the Essex Senior League and play at Gardiners Close.

== History ==
Basildon United's roots go back to 1955, when a club named Armada Sports was formed, joining Division One of the Southend & District League. In 1959 Armada Sports merged with London League club Pitsea United, with Pitsea United effectively absorbing Armada Sports. However, Armada Sports later split from Pitsea United and were renamed Basildon United in 1967. The club joined the Thurrock Thames-side Combination League for the 1967–68 season, before switching to the Reserves Division Two of the Greater London League in 1968. After finishing as runners-up in the division in 1969–70, they were promoted to Reserves Division One. In 1971 the club were founder members of the Essex Senior League (ESL). They finished as runners-up in 1972–73, before winning the league in 1976–77. The club went on to win the league for the next three seasons, as well winning the League Cup in 1977–78, before switching to the Athenian League in 1980.

After finishing second in their first season in the Athenian League, Basildon joined Division Two of the Isthmian League for the 1981–82 season. In 1983–84 they won Division Two and were promoted to Division One. The club remained in Division One until being relegated at the end of the 1988–89 season, when they finished second bottom of the Division, and were demoted to Division Two North. In 1991 Basildon left the Isthmian League and dropped back into the Essex Senior League. They won the league and League Cup double in 1993–94, but did not take promotion to the Isthmian League. The club won the League Cup for a third time in 1997–98 and for a fourth time in 2016–17. After finishing as runners-up in the league in 2017–18, they were promoted to the Isthmian League's North Division. In 2024–25 the club finished second-from-bottom of the North Division and were relegated back to the Essex Senior League.

== Ground ==
The club played at the Gloucester Park Bowl from 1967, with the record attendance of 5,000 being set at the stadium for Armada Sports' friendly against a West Ham United XI in 1963. The ground had uncovered seating along one side of the pitch, with a roof later built to create a 200-seat stand. In 1970 they moved to Gardiners Close and the new ground was opened with another friendly match against West Ham on 11 August in front of a crowd of 3,600, although they continued to play floodlit matches at the Gloucester Park Bowl until floodlights were installed at Gardiners Close. A covered standing area was built on one side of the pitch, but was removed by the end of the 1970s; a new, equally short-lived stand was built in its place in the 1980s with three steps of terracing. Two covered areas were also built on the other side of the pitch, one of which had seats installed after they were removed from Leytonstone's Granleigh Road ground. Another smaller stand was later built between the two covered areas containing the directors box.

Floodlights were installed in 1979 at a cost of £10,000 and inaugurated with a friendly match against Crystal Palace on 30 October, attracting a crowd of over 2,000. Plans were announced in 1995 to move to a new stadium on Courtauld Road next to the A127; however, the plans were dropped in 1997 due to complaints about the proposed development. Gardiners Close currently has a capacity of 2,000, of which 400 is seated and 1,000 covered.

== Honours ==
- Isthmian League
  - Division Two champions 1983–84
- Essex Senior League
  - Champions 1976–77, 1977–78, 1978–79, 1979–80, 1993–94
  - League Cup winners 1977–78, 1993–94, 1997–98, 2016–17
- Essex Senior Trophy
  - Winners 1978–79
- Essex Elizabethan Trophy
  - Winners 1978

== Records ==
- Best FA Cup performance: Third qualifying round, 1983–84, 1998–99
- Best FA Trophy performance: Third qualifying round, 2021–22
- Best FA Vase performance: Quarter-finals, 1980–81
- Record attendance: 5,000 vs West Ham United, friendly match, 1963

== See also ==
- Basildon United F.C. managers
- Basildon United F.C. players
