= Brightlingsea Regent F.C. =

English association football club

Coordinates: 51.8158°N 1.0263°E

Brightlingsea Regent
- Full name: Brightlingsea Regent Football Club
- Nickname: The R's
- Founded: 2005
- Ground: North Road, Brightlingsea
- Chairman: Terry Doherty
- Manager: Ryan Salter
- League: Isthmian League North Division
- 2025–26: Isthmian League North Division, 14th of 22
- Website: www.pitchero.com/clubs/brightlingsearegentfc/
Home colours	Away colours

Brightlingsea Regent Football Club is an English football club based in Brightlingsea, Essex. Formed by a merger of Brightlingsea United and Regent Park Rangers in 2005, they are currently members of the Isthmian League North Division and play at North Road.

== History ==
Brightlingsea United was founded in 1928 by a merger of Brightlingsea Athletic (originally established as Wesley Guild in 1908, before being reformed in 1921) and Brightlingsea Town (established as Brightlingsea Juniors in 1919). The new club played in Division One of the Essex & Suffolk Border League, and in 1929 moved to the North Road ground. They were runners-up in Division One (Junior) in 1929–30, and in 1931 they were promoted to the Premier Division. In 1946–47 they won Division One, and were promoted back to the Premier Division. They were relegated back to Division One in 1954 and returned to the Premier Division as Division One champions in 1961, also jointly winning the Division One Knock-Out Cup following a 1–1 draw with Silver End. However, they were relegated back to Division One after a single season and did not return to the Premier Division until finishing as Division One runners-up in 1968 saw the club promoted. In 1971–72 the club won the League Cup, beating Halstead Town 2–1 in the final.

In 1972 they joined the Essex Senior League. They won the title in 1988–89 and 1989–90, before joining the Division One of the Eastern Counties League in 1990. They finished as runners-up in their first season, and were promoted to the Premier Division. However, they returned to Division One after finishing bottom of the Premier Division in 1992–93. The club resigned from the league shortly before the start of the 2002–03 season after the manager and most of the players left, complaining about a lack of proper changing facilities. The first team replaced their reserves in Division Two of the Essex & Suffolk Border League and were relegated to Division Three at the end of the season. When Division Three was disbanded in 2005, the club was moved back to Division Two. That year the club merged with youth club Regent Park Rangers to form Brightlingsea Regent. The newly merged club won Division Two at the first attempt, and were promoted again the following season after finishing second. In 2010–11 the club won the Premier Division and the A.V. Lee Service Memorial Cup, and were promoted to Division One of the Eastern Counties League.

The 2012–13 season saw the club finish third in Division One, earning promotion to the Premier Division. They also won the First Division Knock-Out Cup, beating Great Yarmouth Town 1–0 in the final. The following season Brightlingsea finished second in the Premier Division, earning promotion to Division One North of the Isthmian League. The 2016–17 season saw them finish the season as Division One North champions, earning promotion to the Premier Division. The club were relegated back to the (renamed) North Division at the end of the 2022–23 season after finishing bottom of the Premier Division.

== Ground ==
During the early days of the club, Brightlingsea played at Bell Green in Bellfield Close, before moving to the Recreation Ground in Regent Road in the 1920s. The club moved to North Road in 1929, having bought the site from Reg Girling for £400. A stand with bench seating and dressing rooms were built, and the local press funded the new press box, which was initially also used as a dressing room for the referee and linesmen. The opening match was played on 7 September 1929 against Parkeston Railway, with Brightlingsea winning 4–1. The stand was dismantled in 1977. A lean-to cover was subsequently built next to the clubhouse and benches were installed to meet ground grading requirements. Floodlights were erected in 1988 and inaugurated with a match against Colchester United. In 2014 a 107-seat stand was installed after being bought from eBay, with a 150-capacity covered terrace added in 2017.

== Honours ==
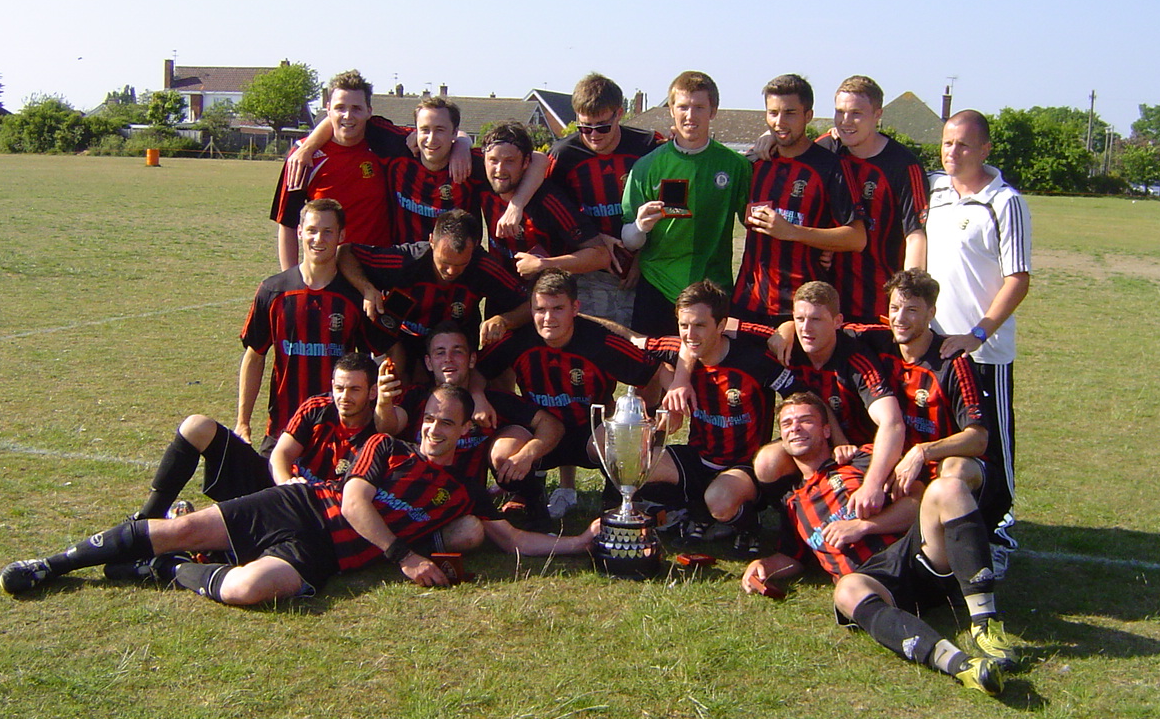
Essex and Suffolk Border Football League 2010–11 Champions

- Isthmian League
  - Division One North champions 2016–17
- Eastern Counties League
  - Division One Knock-out Cup winners 2012–13
- Essex Senior League
  - Champions 1988–89, 1989–90
- Essex & Suffolk Border League
  - Premier Division champions 2010–11
  - Division One champions 1946–47, 1960–61
  - Division Two champions 2005–06
  - League Cup winners 1971–72
  - Division One Knock-Out Cup winners 1960–61 (joint)
  - A.V. Lee Service Memorial Cup winners 2010–11
- Tolleshunt D’Arcy Memorial Cup
  - Winners 2017–18, 2018–19

== Records ==
- Best FA Cup performance: Third qualifying round, 2018–19, 2022–23
- Best FA Trophy performance: Third qualifying round, 2018–19 (replay), 2023–24
- Best FA Vase performance: Fifth round, 2013–14
- Record attendance: 1,200 vs Colchester United, friendly, 1988

== See also ==
- Brightlingsea Regent F.C. players
- Brightlingsea Regent F.C. managers
