= Coggeshall Town F.C. =

Association football club in England

Coordinates: 51.869°N 0.672°E

Coggeshall Town
- Full name: Coggeshall Town Football Club
- Nickname: Seed Growers
- Founded: 27 September 1878
- Ground: West Street, Coggeshall
- Chairman: Graeme Smith
- Manager: Neil Blackburn
- League: Eastern Counties League Division One South
- 2025–26: Eastern Counties League Division One South, 3rd of 21
- Website: coggeshalltownfc.co.uk
Home colours	Away colours

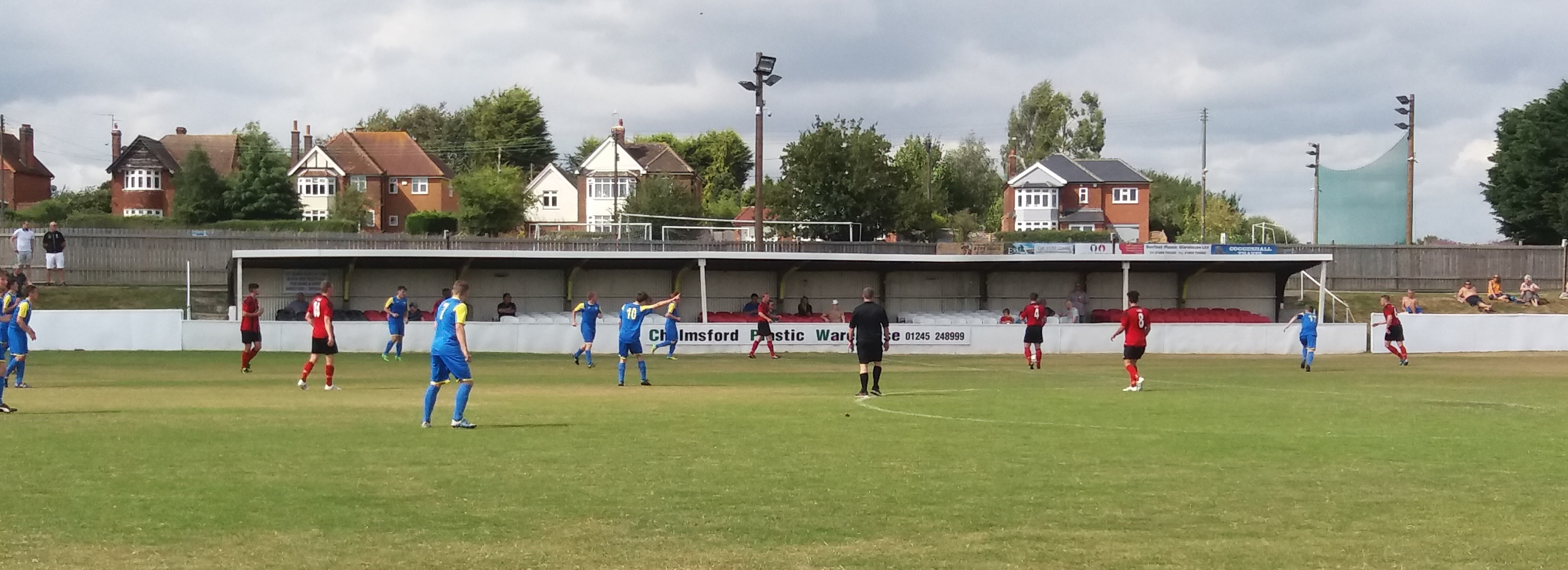
The Main Stand at West Street

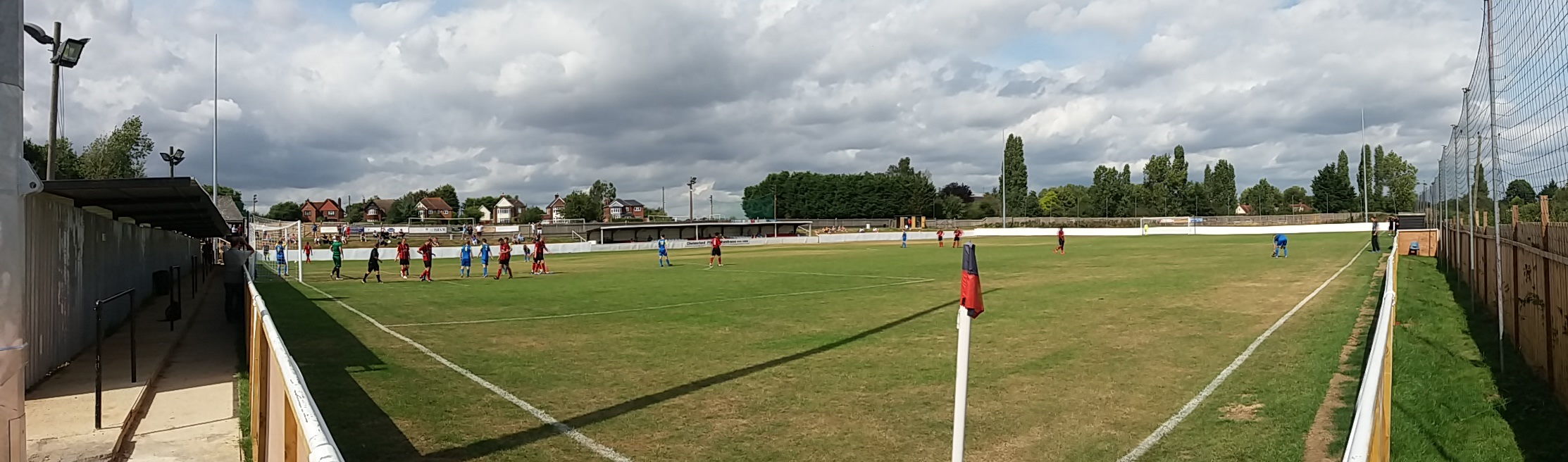
Ground panorama

Coggeshall Town Football Club is a football club based in Coggeshall, Essex, England. The club are currently members of the Eastern Counties League Division One South and play at West Street.

== History ==
The club was established on 27 September 1878 by the J.K. King seed company in a meeting at the White Hart Hotel, with many of the King family and company employees being keen footballers. After losing the final of the Essex Junior Cup in 1899, they joined the North Essex League, going on to win the league four times. The club then joined the Colchester & District League, and won Division II B and the Colchester & District Junior Cup in 1909–10, before retaining the Division II title the following season. In 1911 the league merged into the Essex & Suffolk Border League and the club were Division II B runners-up in 1926–27.

During the inter-war period Coggeshall also played in local leagues around Braintree, Halstead and Kelvedon, as well as returning to the North Essex League, where they won a further ten titles by World War II. After the war, the club joined the Braintree & District League, before switching to the Colchester & East Essex League. They were promoted to the Premier Division at the end of the 1951–52 after finishing as runners-up in Division One. In 1959 the club moved up to the Essex & Suffolk Border League, and won Division One in 1962–63.

The late 1960s and early 1970s saw a prolonged period of success for the Coggeshall as they won back-to-back Premier Division titles in 1966–67 and 1967–68, finished as runners-up in 1968–69 and won a third title in 1969–70. They also won the League Cup in both 1968–69 and 1969–70, beating Whitton United 3–2 in the 1969 final and Heybridge Swifts 1–0 in the 1970 final. After finishing as runners-up in 1970–71 and 1971–72, the club joined the Essex Senior League in 1972. After finishing bottom of the table for three consecutive seasons between 1983–84 and 1985–86, the club left the league. They rejoined the league in 1987, but left again at the end of the 1988–89 season for financial reasons.

Coggeshall had two spells in the Essex Intermediate League during the 1990s, before rejoining the Essex & Suffolk Border League. They won Division Three in 1994–95 and were Division Three runners-up in 2000–01. In 2012–13 they finished second in Division One, earning promotion to the Premier Division. In 2015–16 they won the Premier Division and the League Cup, beating Holland 4–3 on penalties, following a 0–0 draw. At the end of the season they were promoted to Division One of the Eastern Counties League. The following season saw them finish as Division One runners-up, resulting in promotion to the Premier Division. In 2017–18 the club won the Premier Division title at the first attempt, earning promotion to the North Division of the Isthmian League.

Coggeshall's first season in the Isthmian League ended with a fourth-place finish and qualification for the promotion play-offs, with the club losing 1–0 to Maldon & Tiptree in the semi-finals. In 2022–23 they finished fourth-from-bottom of the division. After losing an inter-step play-off to Winterton Rangers the club were relegated to the Essex Senior League. The club finished bottom of the Essex Senior League the following season and were relegated to Division One South of the Eastern Counties League. In 2025–26 they finished third in the division, before losing 3–2 to Rayleigh Town in the play-off semi-finals.

== Ground ==
The club originally played at Myneer Park, before moving to Barnard Field on Pointwell Lane for the 1880–81 season. The following season saw the club move to Highfields Farm Park, where they played until relocating to Fabians Field on Colne Road in 1890. In 1895 the club returned to Highfields. After being given notice to leave the ground in 1960, land for a new ground on West Street was offered to them on a leasehold basis, with £2,000 raised to prepare it for the club. A pavilion was opened in 1961, a stand in 1964 and a clubhouse in 1971, at which point the club moved its headquarters from the Chapel Hotel. Floodlights were installed in 1967. When the landowner decided to sell the site in 1981, the club raised enough money to purchase it.

The ground's record attendance of 1,124 was set at the end of the 1967–68 when Coggeshall defeated Tiptree United to win the Essex & Suffolk Border League at the end of the 1967–68 season.

== Honours ==
- Eastern Counties League
  - Premier Division champions 2017–18
- Essex & Suffolk Border League
  - Premier Division champions 1966–67, 1967–68, 1969–70, 2015–16
  - Division One champions 1962–63
  - Division Three champions 1994–95
  - League Cup winners 1968–69, 1969–70, 2015–16
- Colchester & District League
  - Division II B champions 1909–10, 1910–11
- Essex Intermediate Cup
  - Winners 1970–71
- Colchester & District Junior Cup
  - Winners 1909–10

== Records ==
- Best FA Cup performance: Third qualifying round, 2018–19
- Best FA Trophy performance: Extra preliminary round, 2018–19, 2019–20
- Best FA Vase performance: Third round, 1974–75
- Record attendance: 1,124 vs Tiptree United, Essex & Suffolk Border League, 1968

== See also ==
- Coggeshall Town F.C. players
- Coggeshall Town F.C. managers
