= Sawbridgeworth Town F.C. =

English football club

Coordinates: 51°49′07″N 0°08′49″E

Sawbridgeworth Town
- Full name: Sawbridgeworth Town Football Club
- Nickname: Robins
- Founded: 1897
- Ground: Crofters End, Sawbridgeworth
- Capacity: 2,500 (175 seated)
- Chairman: Dawn Hoddle
- Manager: Ben Taylor
- League: Spartan South Midlands League Premier Division
- 2025–26: Spartan South Midlands League Premier Division, 8th of 20
Home colours	Away colours

Sawbridgeworth Town Football Club is an English football club based in Sawbridgeworth, Hertfordshire. The club are currently members of the Spartan South Midlands League Premier Division and play at Crofters End.

== History ==
The club was founded in 1897 as Sawbridgeworth. In 1924, Sawbridgeworth won the East Herts League, winning the Herts Junior Cup three years later. In 1936, Sawbridgeworth joined the Spartan League. The club entered the Herts County League Division One in the 1953–54 season, but left after only one season, joining the Bishop's Stortford, Stansted & District League and the Hertford & District League.

Sawbridgeworth joined the Essex Olympian League, becoming founder members, in 1966 and were crowned champions in 1971–72. They joined the Essex Senior League in 1976 and changed their name to Sawbridgeworth Town. They achieved their best FA Vase performance in 1980–81 when they reached a third round replay. Sawbridgeworth finished runners-up in the league in 1992–93 and 1994–95. They achieved their best performance in the FA Cup, the first qualifying round, in 2016–17. In 2023, they transferred to the Spartan South Midland League.

== Ground ==
Upon formation, the club played at Pishiobury Park in the south of the town. Following World War I, moved to Cambridge Road in the north of the town, later being named Crofters End.

== Honours ==
- East Herts League
  - Champions 1923–24
- Essex Olympian League
  - Champions 1971–72
- Herts Junior Cup
  - Champions 1926–27
- Herts Senior Centenary Trophy
  - Champions 1990–91, 1993–94

== Records ==
- Best FA Cup performance: First qualifying round, 2016–17
- Best FA Vase performance: Third round replay, 1980–81
- Attendance: 610 vs Bishop's Stortford
