= Witham Town F.C. =

Association football club in England

Coordinates: 51°47′59″N 0°37′36″E

Witham Town
- Full name: Witham Town Football Club
- Nickname: The Town
- Founded: 1876; 150 years ago
- Ground: The Simarco Stadium, Spa Road, Witham
- Capacity: 2,500 (250 seated)
- Chairman: Mark Nichols
- Manager: Kevin Hunter
- League: Isthmian League North Division
- 2025–26: Isthmian League North Division, 9th of 22
- Website: http://www.pitchero.com/clubs/withamtown/
Home colours	Away colours

Witham Town Football Club is a semi professional English football club based in Witham, Essex. The club are currently members of the Isthmian League North Division and play at the Simarco Stadium.

== History ==
Clubs named Witham Town have been in existence since the mid 19th century with the original club being disbanded in 1914 due to World War I. The club reformed in 1918 and won the Braintree and District League championship in 1920–21 and 1924–25 as well as the Essex Shield Division Two in 1925–26. They joined the Chelmsford and Mid Essex League (later the Mid-Essex League) and were Division Three champions in 1935–36. They were disbanded again due to the outbreak of World War II.

The club was reformed again after the war and rejoined the Mid-Essex League. They won Division Three in 1947–48 and Division Two the following season. They won the Premier Division cup in 1949–50, but following a dispute with the league over a match played in snowy conditions, the club switched to the South Essex League in 1952. They won the league in 1955–56, before joining the Essex & Suffolk Border League in 1958. They won the ESBL in 1964–65 and 1970–71, as well as the League Cup in 1965–66.

In 1971 they were founder members of the Essex Senior League, and were its inaugural champions. They won the league again in 1985–86 and after finishing as runners-up the following season, were promoted to Division Two North of the Isthmian League in 1987. They remained in Division Two until being relegated to Division Three in 2000, which was renamed Division Two in 2002. After finishing as runners-up in 2005–06 they were promoted to Division One North, where they remained until finishing second from bottom in 2008–09, and being relegated back to the Essex Senior League.

On 4 May 2014, they sealed promotion to the Isthmian League Premier Division after a 3–0 play-off final win at home against Harlow Town.

== Ground ==
After being reformed after World War II the club initially played on a cow pasture with a barn acting as the changing rooms. During the 1949–50 season the club moved to the Crittall Windows works ground in the park in the town centre. In 1964 the club decided to seek new playing facilities suitable for senior football and in 1970 was offered its present ground, Spa Road, although the move did not happen until 1975. Floodlights were added to the ground in 1984, being inaugurated in a friendly against Colchester United. Witham's record attendance is 1,205, set on 7 March 2026 against Gorleston, surpassing the previous record of 898, set in their 2014 play-off victory against Harlow Town.

== Honours ==
- Essex Senior League
  - Champions 1971–72, 1985–86, 2011–12
- Essex Senior Trophy
  - Winners 1985–86
- Essex & Suffolk Border League
  - Champions 1964–65, 1970–71
  - League Cup winners 1965–66
- South Essex League
  - Champions 1955–56
- Mid-Essex League
  - Premier Division Cup winners 1949–50
  - Division Two champions 1948–49
  - Division Three champions 1935–36, 1947–48
- Braintree and District League
  - Champions 1920–21, 1924–25
- Tolleshunt D’Arcy Memorial Cup
  - Champions: 1948–49, 1980–81, 1981–82, 2011–12, 2012–13, 2023–24

== Records ==
- Best FA Cup performance: Fourth qualifying round, 2014–15
- Best FA Trophy performance: Third qualfying round, 2007–08, 2021–22, 2022–23, 2025–26
- Best FA Vase performance: Fifth round, 1986–87
- Record attendance: 1,205 vs Gorleston, Isthmian League North Division, 7 March 2026
