= Bowers & Pitsea F.C. =

Association football club in England

Coordinates: 51°34′26″N 0°31′5″E

Bowers & Pitsea
- Full name: Bowers & Pitsea Football Club
- Nickname: Bowers
- Founded: 1946
- Ground: Len Salmon Stadium, Pitsea
- Capacity: 2,000 (200 seated)
- Chairman: Barry Hubbard
- Manager: Vacant
- League: Isthmian League North Division
- 2025–26: Isthmian League North Division, 7th of 22
- Website: bowerspitseafc.co.uk
| Home colours | Away colours |

Bowers & Pitsea Football Club is a football club based in Pitsea, Essex, England. The club are currently members of the Isthmian League North Division and play at the Len Salmon Stadium.

== History ==
The club was established in 1946 by Bert Salmon as Bowers United and initially played in the Thurrock and Thameside Combination. The club won the league in 1958–59, and became founder members of the Essex Olympian League in 1966, before moving up to the Essex Senior League in 1974. In 1980–81 the club won the league, and the following season saw them win the League Challenge Cup. They won the Harry Fisher Trophy in 1991–92, before going on to win the league and challenge cup double in 1998–99.

In 2004 Bowers United absorbed Pitsea Football Club, adopting their current name. Pitsea had played in the Vange & District Sunday League and the Basildon Sunday League, winning the league treble in 1994–95 and 1995–96, and the league and cup double in 1996–97. In 2014–15 the club won the Challenge Cup for a third time. The following season saw them win the league, earning promotion to Division One North of the Isthmian League. They also reached the semi-finals of the FA Vase, losing 4–3 on aggregate to eventual winners Morpeth Town.

The 2017–18 season saw Bowers & Pitsea finish third in the renamed North Division, qualifying for the promotion play-offs. However, they were beaten 2–0 by Canvey Island in the semi-finals. The following season the club were North Division champions, earning promotion to the Premier Division. In 2021–22 they reached the first round of the FA Cup for the first time, losing 1–0 at Lincoln City. They were relegated back to the North Division at the end of the 2022–23 season after finishing fourth-from-bottom of the Premier Division. However, the season also saw them win the Thameside Trophy for the first time with a 3–2 victory over Grays Athletic in the final. In 2023–24 the club finished fourth in the North Division, qualifying for the promotion play offs. After beating Felixstowe & Walton United on penalties in the semi-finals, they defeated Brentwood Town on penalties in the final to secure an immediate promotion back to the Premier Division. The following season saw them finish bottom of the Premier Division, resulting in relegation to the North Division.

== Ground ==
The club were originally based at what later became Pitsea Market, before moving to Gun Meadow. When the A13 was built, the Gun Meadow ground was subject to a compulsory purchase order, resulting in the club moving to its current home on Crown Avenue. The site was purchased from the Basildon Development Corporation, as well as a prefabricated building that became the club's dressing rooms. It was officially opened with a friendly match against an ex-Tottenham Hotspur All-Star team. A seated stand was built on one side of the pitch, with the original bench seating later replaced with red tip-up seats. A covered standing area was erected next to the seated stand.

The ground currently has a capacity of 2,000, of which 200 is seated.

== Honours ==
- Isthmian League
  - North Division champions 2018–19
- Essex Senior League
  - Champions 1980–81, 1998–99, 2015–16
  - Challenge Cup winners 1981–82, 1998–99, 2014–15
  - Harry Fisher Trophy winners 1991–92
  - Don Douglas Memorial Trophy winners 1997–98, 1998–99, 2002–03, 2014–15
- Thurrock & Thameside Combination League
  - Champions 1958–59
- Thameside Trophy
  - Winners 2022–23

== Records ==
- Best FA Cup performance: First round, 2021–22
- Best FA Trophy performance: First round, 2024–25
- Best FA Vase performance: Semi-finals, 2015–16
- Record attendance: 1,800 vs Billericay Town, FA Vase
- Biggest victory: 14–1 vs Stansted, 2006–07
- Heaviest defeat: 8–0 vs Ford United, 1996–97

== See also ==
- Bowers & Pitsea F.C. players
- Bowers & Pitsea F.C. managers
