= Stansted F.C. =

Association football club in England

Coordinates: 51°54′23.35″N 0°11′38.21″E

Stansted
- Full name: Stansted Football Club
- Nicknames: The Blues, The Airportmen
- Founded: 1902; 124 years ago
- Ground: Hargrave Park, Stansted Mountfitchet
- Capacity: 2,000 (200 seated)
- Chairman: Glyn Warwick
- Manager: Paul Pittuck John Watters
- League: Eastern Counties League Division One South
- 2025–26: Eastern Counties League Division One South, 8th of 21
Home colours	Away colours

Stansted Football Club is an English football club based in Stansted Mountfitchet, Essex. The club are currently members of the Eastern Counties League Division One South and play at Hargrave Park.

== History ==
There are references to the club existing in 1892, but the founding date is put at the point when the club moved to Green Meadow. They won the Stansted & District Challenge Cup in 1914 and 1922, and by the 1930s they were playing in the East Herts League, which they won in 1934–35. In 1937 they moved to Hargrave Park. After World War II they were admitted to the Herts Senior County League, and joined the Premier Division in 1956. They were relegated to Division One after finishing bottom of the division in 1964–65, where they remained until being founder members of the Essex Senior League in 1971.

In 1983–84 they reached the final of the FA Vase, where they defeated Stamford 3–2. That season also saw them win the East Anglian Cup, the league cup and the Eastern Floodlit Cup, as well as defeating Coggeshall Town 15–0 in the league, setting its record margin of victory. In 2009–10 they won the Essex Senior League for the first time, but were denied promotion due to Hargrave Park failing to meet the necessary criteria.

== Ground ==
Stansted's Hargrave Park ground was opened in 1935, with the club moving to the site two years later. In 1983, floodlights were installed at the ground, being inaugurated in a friendly against Tottenham Hotspur, following the building of the clubhouse a year prior.

== Notable former players ==
Players who have gone on to play League football include Gary Hart, who played for Brighton & Hove Albion, Alfie Potter, who went on to play for Oxford United and Dwight Gayle, who went on to play for Crystal Palace and Newcastle United

== Honours ==
- FA Vase
  - Winners 1983–84
- Essex Senior League
  - Champions 2009–10
  - League Cup winners 1983–84
- East Herts League
  - Champions 1934–35
- East Anglian Cup
  - Winners 1983–84
- Eastern Floodlit Cup
  - Winners 1983–84
- Stansted & District Challenge Cup
  - Winners 1913–14, 1921–22

== Records ==
- Highest League Position: First in Essex Senior League, 2009–10
- Best FA Cup performance: Third qualifying round, 1996–97
- Best FA Vase performance: Winners, 1983–84
- Attendance: 828 vs Whickham, FA Vase, 1983–84
