= Craig Mackail-Smith =

Association football player (born 1984)

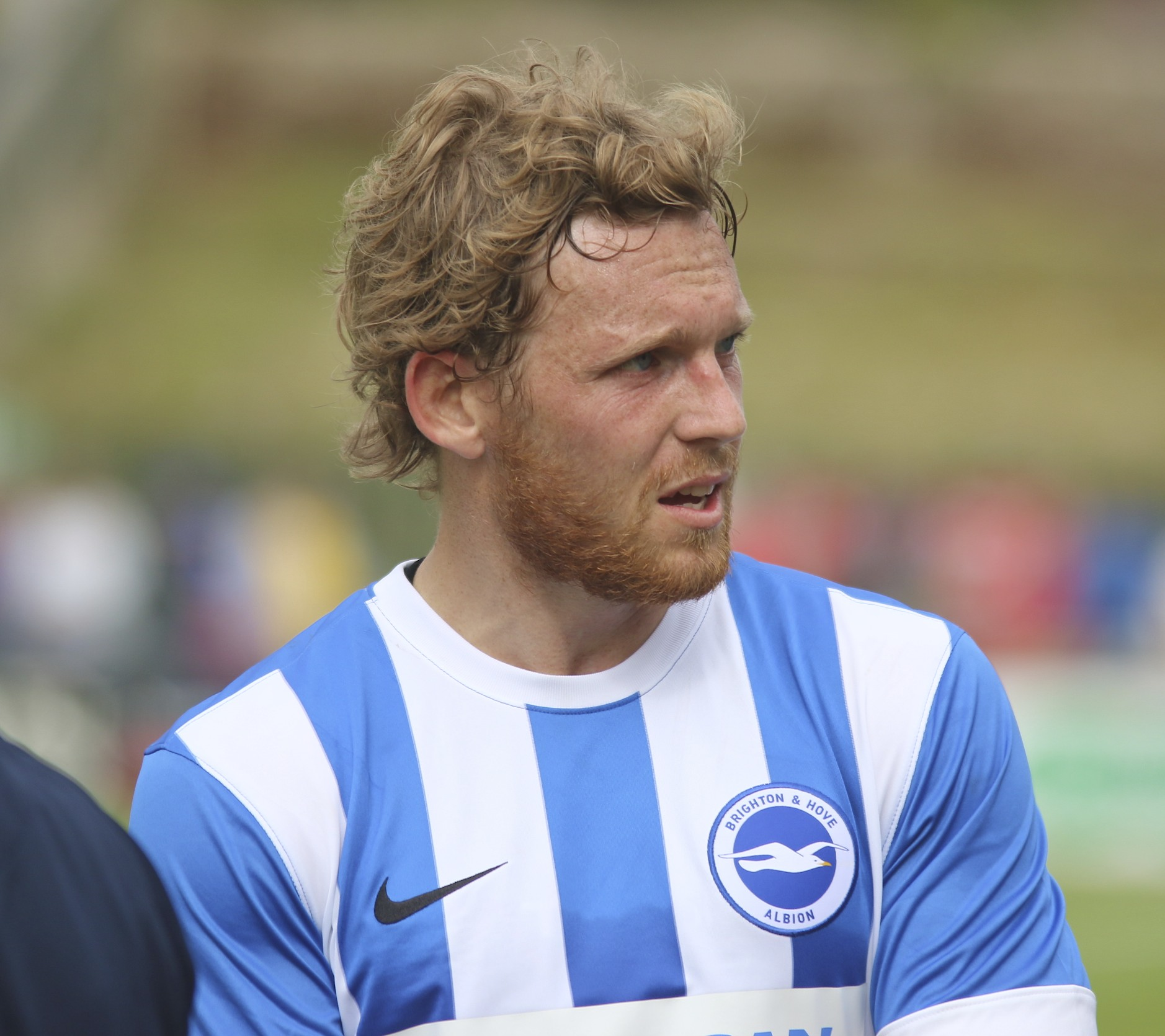
- Mackail-Smith playing for Brighton & Hove Albion in 2014

Personal information
- Full name: Craig Anthony Robert Mackail-Smith
- Date of birth: 25 February 1984 (age 42)
- Place of birth: Watford, England
- Height: 5 ft 10 in (1.78 m)
- Position: Striker

Team information
- Current team: Peterborough United (first team coach)

Youth career
- 1999–2000: St Albans City

Senior career*
| Years | Team | Apps | (Gls) |
| 2000–2003 | St Albans City | 31 | (1) |
| 2003 | → Arlesey Town (loan) | | |
| 2003–2004 | Arlesey Town | | |
| 2004–2007 | Dagenham & Redbridge | 107 | (38) |
| 2007–2011 | Peterborough United | 185 | (80) |
| 2011–2015 | Brighton & Hove Albion | 109 | (21) |
| 2014 | → Peterborough United (loan) | 3 | (0) |
| 2015–2017 | Luton Town | 35 | (4) |
| 2017 | → Peterborough United (loan) | 18 | (5) |
| 2017–2020 | Wycombe Wanderers | 62 | (11) |
| 2019 | → Notts County (loan) | 16 | (3) |
| 2019–2020 | → Stevenage (loan) | 18 | (0) |
| 2020–2023 | Bedford Town | 29 | (3) |
| Total | | 613 | (166) |

International career
| 2005–2006 | England C | 7 | (4) |
| 2011–2012 | Scotland | 7 | (1) |
- * Club domestic league appearances and goals

Craig Anthony Robert Mackail-Smith (born 25 February 1984) is a retired professional footballer who played as a striker. He is currently a first team coach at Peterborough United.

He played in the English Football League for Brighton & Hove Albion, Luton Town, Peterborough United, Wycombe Wanderers, Notts County and Stevenage, and at senior international level for the Scotland national team.

== Club career ==
=== St Albans City ===
Born in Watford, Hertfordshire, Mackail-Smith began his career with the youth system at St Albans City in 1999. He made the step up to the first-team during the 2000–01 season, making his debut as a 68th-minute substitute in a 0–0 draw at home to Billericay Town on 10 March 2001. Mackail-Smith made his first starting appearance for the club in a 1–1 draw away to Gravesend & Northfleet in the Full Members Cup third round, resulting in a 4–3 defeat on penalties after a penalty shoot-out. He made six further starting appearances to complete the season with a total of ten appearances in all competitions. Mackail-Smith struggled to hold down a first-team place during the 2001–02 season, making just 13 appearances, of which only three were from the starting lineup. However, he scored his first senior goal in a 2–0 win away to Hertford Town in the Herts Senior Cup second round on 20 November 2001. In 2002–03, Mackail-Smith continued to find his first-team opportunities limited, making just five starting appearances from 22 matches in all competitions. He scored once in a 3–2 win away to Hampton & Richmond Borough on 26 April 2003.

=== Arlesey Town ===
Mackail-Smith was loaned out to Isthmian League Division One North club Arlesey Town in 2002–03, before making a permanent move for the 2003–04 season. He made 54 appearances, scoring 17 goals during the season, including a brace in a 4–2 win at home to Dagenham & Redbridge in the FA Trophy on 3 February 2004.

=== Dagenham & Redbridge ===
In May 2004, Mackail-Smith joined Conference National club Dagenham & Redbridge, where he scored 38 league goals in two and a half seasons.

=== Peterborough United ===
On 29 January 2007, Mackail-Smith was signed by League Two club Peterborough United, with Dagenham retaining 15% of any future transfer fee. He made a strong start to his Peterborough United career, scoring eight goals in 15 games. Peterborough won promotion to League One in Mackail-Smith's first full season with the club, in which he made 36 appearances, scoring 12 goals. His seven goals in four matches in the FA Cup saw him finish as top scorer in the competition. This included four goals in a 5–0 win away to Staines Town in the second round, which saw him win the FA Cup Player of the Round award. The following season, Mackail-Smith scored 23 goals in 46 appearances to help Peterborough win a second successive promotion to the Championship.

Steve Claridge published a scouting report on Mackail-Smith on 23 September 2008. He described him as "a rampaging Nordic Viking with his long blonde hair" and was impressed by the way he would pick up the ball and run at defenders, attacking at every opportunity in what Claridge described as a positive way. Mackail-Smith scored 35 goals for the club in 2010–11, making him the most prolific scorer in England for the season. His 27 goals in League One made him top scorer and earned him the League One Player of the Year award, helping Peterborough to reach the League One play-offs. He was also named in the PFA League One Team of the Year. Mackail-Smith scored in each play-off match, including the second goal in a 3–0 win over Huddersfield Town in the 2011 Football League One play-off final at Old Trafford to clinch an instant return to the Championship for Peterborough. Following the match, Mackail-Smith expressed his desire to leave the club, stating "I want to play at the highest level I can attain and I want to play in the Premier League." He was the subject of bids from Premier League clubs including Queens Park Rangers. Mackail-Smith made 212 appearances for Peterborough United, scoring 99 goals.

=== Brighton & Hove Albion ===
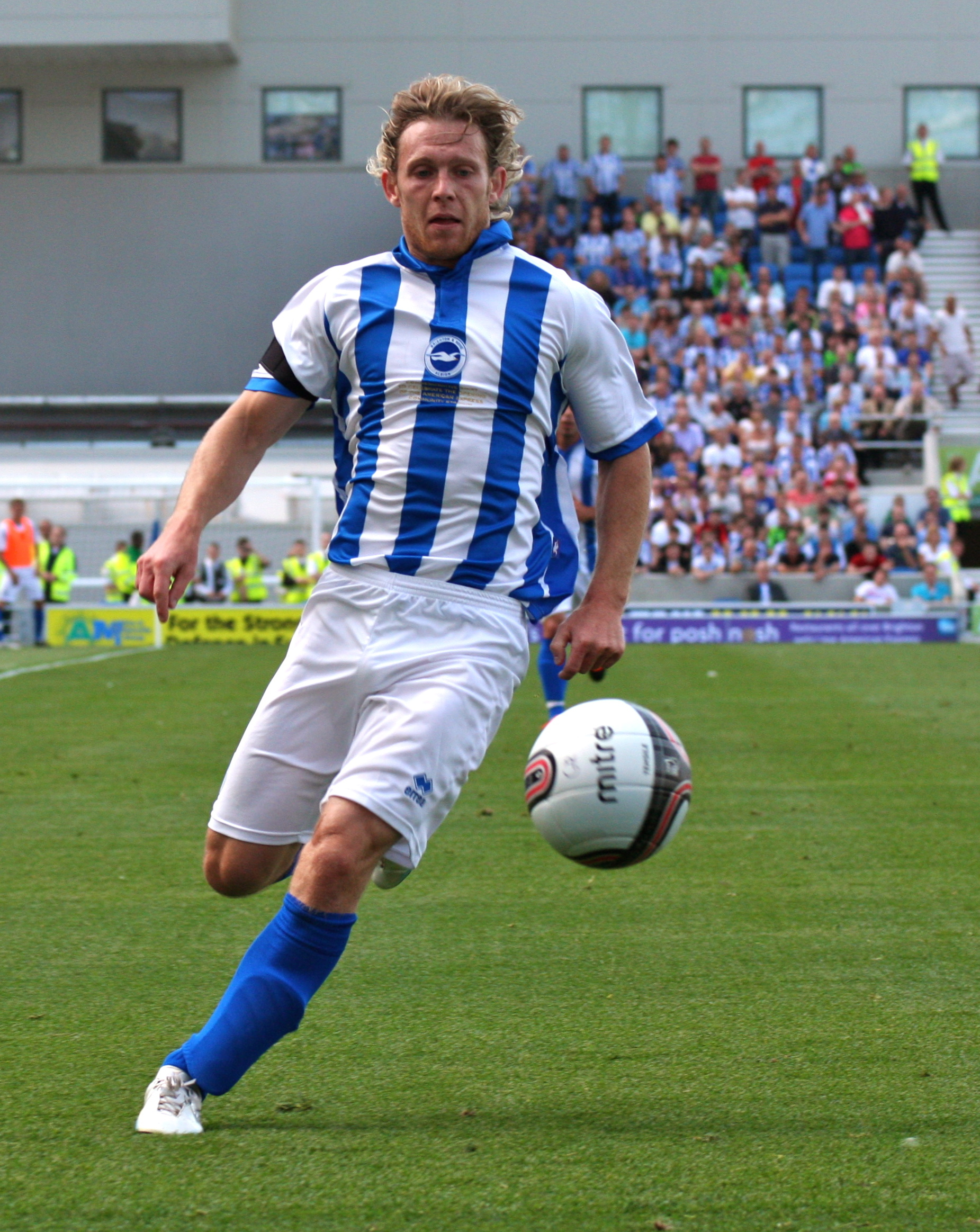
Mackail-Smith playing for Brighton & Hove Albion in 2011

On 4 July 2011, Mackail-Smith joined Brighton & Hove Albion for an initial transfer fee of £2.5 million, possibly rising to £3.25 million, signing a four-year contract. He scored his first goal for Brighton in a 1–0 win away to Portsmouth on 13 August. Mackail-Smith then scored four goals in his next seven matches, including a brace in a 3–3 draw at home to Leeds United. However, Mackail-Smith then hit a goal drought and struggled to score, netting just one goal between October and February in a 1–0 win away to Derby County on 29 November. He ended his goal drought by coming off the bench to score the opening goal in a 2–1 win away to Leeds United, Brighton's first away victory over Leeds in 26 years. On his 28th birthday, Mackail-Smith scored at Falmer Stadium for the first time in five months in a 3–0 win at home to Ipswich Town, and scored again the next weekend in a 1–1 draw with Doncaster Rovers. In total, Mackail-Smith scored 10 goals for Brighton, and he revealed his disappointment at his goal haul, which he largely put down to adapting to Brighton's passing style of football.

Mackail-Smith enjoyed a strong start to the 2012–13 season, scoring six goals in six games. This included two spectacular strikes, one an overhead kick, in a 3–1 victory over Burnley. He scored a total of 11 goals before a serious injury to his Achilles tendon on 5 March 2013 prevented him from playing for 13 months. Mackail-Smith returned for Brighton's final run-in to the 2013–14 season, playing in both legs of the play-off semi-final against Derby County, which the club lost 6–2 on aggregate. During the 2014–15 season, Mackail-Smith found himself back in the first-team under new manager Sami Hyypiä, but struggled to score, netting just three goals in 34 appearances in all competitions. On 24 April 2015, Brighton confirmed that Mackail-Smith's contract would not be renewed and that he would leave the club during the summer.

==== Peterborough United (loan) ====
Mackail-Smith rejoined Peterborough United on loan on 27 November 2014, a move that saw him link-up once more with striker Aaron McLean, having scored 183 goals between them during their previous partnership at the club from 2007 and 2011, which included three promotions. He made his second debut in a 3–0 defeat at home to Bristol City one day later. He was recalled by Brighton caretaker manager Nathan Jones on 23 December, having made three appearances for Peterborough during his loan spell.

=== Luton Town ===
In July 2015, Mackail-Smith began training with League Two club Luton Town, headed up by his former Dagenham & Redbridge manager John Still. He featured in numerous pre-season friendlies, rebuffing interest from League One teams Blackpool and Southend United, before signing a two-year contract with Luton on 1 August. He debuted on the opening day of 2015–16 in a 1–1 draw away to Accrington Stanley. Mackail-Smith scored his first goal for Luton in a 3–2 defeat away to Yeovil Town on 22 August, and followed up with his second goal one week later in a 2–1 defeat at home to Portsmouth. A fractured tibia suffered after just 15 minutes during a 1–0 win away to Plymouth Argyle on 19 March 2016 ended Mackail-Smith's season, having made 34 appearances, scoring four goals in all competitions.

Mackail-Smith suffered a further setback in pre-season ahead of 2016–17 when he underwent surgery to insert a pin in his fractured tibia, ruling him out for another six weeks. However, he made a full recovery and made his return as a 70th-minute substitute for Jordan Cook in a 3–1 win away to Exeter City in the FA Cup on 5 November 2016. Mackail-Smith struggled to force his way into the first-team and returned to League One club Peterborough United on loan until the end of 2016–17. His first appearance after returning on loan came four days later in a 3–0 victory away to Port Vale and completed the loan spell with 18 appearances and five goals. Mackail-Smith was released when his contract expired at the end of 2016–17.

=== Wycombe Wanderers ===
On 17 August 2017, Mackail-Smith signed for League Two club Wycombe Wanderers on a one-year contract. He signed a new two-year contract with Wycombe on 26 April 2018.

Mackail-Smith joined League Two club Notts County on 30 January 2019 on loan until the end of 2018–19 where he would write himself into club folklore by scoring the only goal in a 1–0 win against bitter rivals Mansfield Town that would ultimately cost them promotion.

He joined another League Two club, Stevenage, on 2 September 2019 on loan until 12 January 2020. His first goal for Stevenage was the winning goal in a 1–0 victory over Bristol Rovers in the EFL Trophy third round on 8 January 2020, which set up a quarter-final tie against Exeter City. The loan was extended until the end of the season on 17 January. After returning to Wycombe, he was released by the club at the end of the season.

=== Bedford Town ===
Mackail-Smith signed for Southern League Division One Central club Bedford Town on 29 September 2020. Mackail-Smith was part of the Bedford Town side which was crowned Southern League Division One Central Champions in the 2021–22 season.

On 9 January 2023, Mackail-Smith announced his retirement from football, continuing to remain at Bedford to support the club in various roles.

== International career ==
=== England C ===
While with Dagenham & Redbridge, Mackail-Smith received his first international recognition being called up to play for the England C team, winning seven caps and scoring four goals. He helped England C win the 2005–06 European Challenge Trophy, scoring twice.

=== Scotland ===
Mackail-Smith qualified to play for Scotland through his Edinburgh-born grandmother Margaret and confirmed his interest in playing for Scotland if called up in May 2009. On 24 March 2011, he received his first senior international call-up from Scotland boss Craig Levein for a friendly with Brazil on 27 March. He made his international debut when he came on as an 87th-minute substitute for Kenny Miller. He scored his first international goal against Liechtenstein on 8 October in a crucial Euro 2012 qualifier, and played in the match against Spain in Alicante on 11 October, winning a penalty from which David Goodwillie scored, in a match that Spain won 3–1. Mackail-Smith played seven times for Scotland in total, scoring one goal.

== Coaching career ==
In December 2024, Mackail-Smith joined National League side Woking as Head of Performance.

On 16 October 2026, Mackail-Smith returned to Peterborough United as a first team coach working primarily on attacking.

== Career statistics ==
=== Club ===
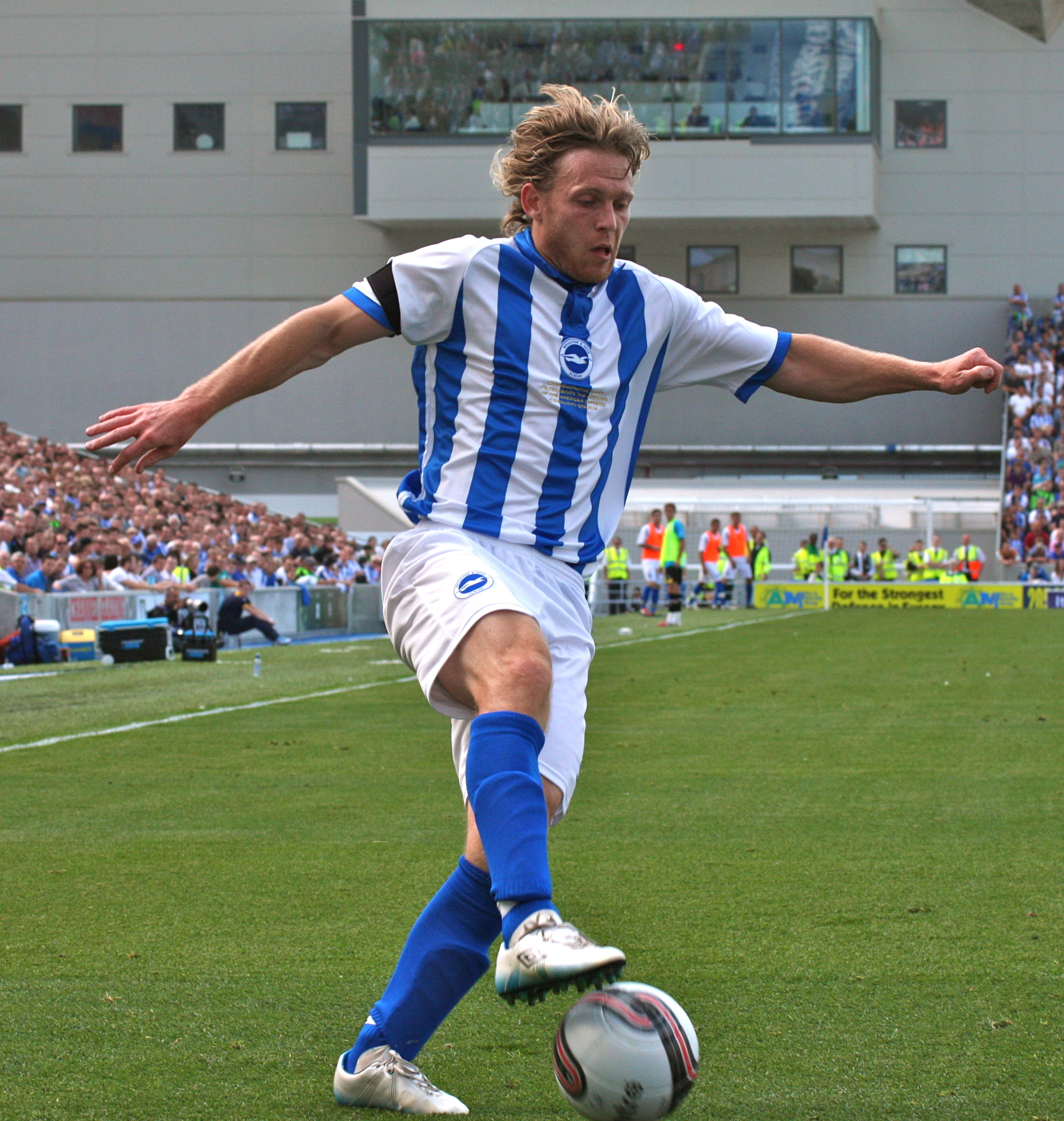
Mackail-Smith playing for Brighton & Hove Albion in 2011

As of match played 31 October 2020

Appearances and goals by club, season and competition
| Club | Season | League | | | FA Cup | | League Cup | | Other | | Total | |
| Club | Season | Division | Apps | Goals | Apps | Goals | Apps | Goals | Apps | Goals | Apps | Goals |
|---|---|---|---|---|---|---|---|---|---|---|---|---|
| St Albans City | 2000–01 | Isthmian League Premier Division | 9 | 0 | 0 | 0 | — | | 1 (Note: Appearance in Full Members Cup) | 0 | 10 | 0 |
| St Albans City | 2001–02 | Isthmian League Premier Division | 8 | 0 | 0 | 0 | — | | 5 (Note: One appearance in Isthmian League Cup, two appearances and one goal in Herts Senior Cup, one appearance in Herts Charity Cup, one in Billy Minter Trophy) | 1 | 13 | 1 |
| St Albans City | 2002–03 | Isthmian League Premier Division | 14 | 1 | 3 | 0 | — | | 5 (Note: Three appearances in Isthmian League Cup, two in Herts Senior Cup) | 0 | 22 | 1 |
| St Albans City | Total | | 31 | 1 | 3 | 0 | — | | 11 | 1 | 45 | 2 |
| Dagenham & Redbridge | 2004–05 | Conference National | 40 | 12 | 2 | 0 | — | | 1 (Note: Appearance(s) in FA Trophy) | 0 | 43 | 12 |
| Dagenham & Redbridge | 2005–06 | Conference National | 39 | 11 | 1 | 0 | — | | 5 | 3 | 45 | 14 |
| Dagenham & Redbridge | 2006–07 | Conference National | 28 | 15 | 1 | 0 | — | | 2 | 1 | 31 | 16 |
| Dagenham & Redbridge | Total | | 107 | 38 | 4 | 0 | — | | 8 | 4 | 119 | 42 |
| Peterborough United | 2006–07 | League Two | 15 | 8 | — | | — | | — | | 15 | 8 |
| Peterborough United | 2007–08 | League Two | 36 | 12 | 4 | 7 | 0 | 0 | 1 (Note: Appearance in Football League Trophy) | 0 | 41 | 19 |
| Peterborough United | 2008–09 | League One | 46 | 23 | 5 | 3 | 1 | 0 | 1 | 0 | 53 | 26 |
| Peterborough United | 2009–10 | Championship | 43 | 10 | 1 | 0 | 3 | 1 | — | | 47 | 11 |
| Peterborough United | 2010–11 | League One | 45 | 27 | 4 | 2 | 3 | 3 | 4 (Note: One appearance in Football League Trophy, three appearances and three goals in League One play-offs) | 3 | 56 | 35 |
| Peterborough United | Total | | 185 | 80 | 14 | 12 | 7 | 4 | 6 | 3 | 212 | 99 |
| Brighton & Hove Albion | 2011–12 | Championship | 45 | 9 | 3 | 0 | 2 | 1 | — | | 50 | 10 |
| Brighton & Hove Albion | 2012–13 | Championship | 29 | 11 | 2 | 0 | 0 | 0 | 0 | 0 | 31 | 11 |
| Brighton & Hove Albion | 2013–14 | Championship | 5 | 0 | 0 | 0 | 0 | 0 | 2 (Note: Appearances in Championship play-offs) | 0 | 7 | 0 |
| Brighton & Hove Albion | 2014–15 | Championship | 30 | 1 | 1 | 0 | 3 | 2 | — | | 34 | 3 |
| Brighton & Hove Albion | Total | | 109 | 21 | 6 | 0 | 5 | 3 | 2 | 0 | 122 | 24 |
| Peterborough United (loan) | 2014–15 | League One | 3 | 0 | — | | — | | — | | 3 | 0 |
| Luton Town | 2015–16 | League Two | 33 | 4 | 1 | 0 | 0 | 0 | 0 | 0 | 34 | 4 |
| Luton Town | 2016–17 | League Two | 2 | 0 | 1 | 0 | 0 | 0 | 3 (Note: Appearance(s) in EFL Trophy) | 1 | 6 | 1 |
| Luton Town | Total | | 35 | 4 | 2 | 0 | 0 | 0 | 3 | 1 | 40 | 5 |
| Peterborough United (loan) | 2016–17 | League One | 18 | 5 | — | | — | | — | | 18 | 5 |
| Wycombe Wanderers | 2017–18 | League Two | 41 | 8 | 2 | 2 | 0 | 0 | 0 | 0 | 43 | 10 |
| Wycombe Wanderers | 2018–19 | League One | 21 | 3 | 1 | 0 | 2 | 0 | 1 | 0 | 25 | 3 |
| Wycombe Wanderers | 2019–20 | League One | 0 | 0 | — | | 0 | 0 | 0 | 0 | 0 | 0 |
| Wycombe Wanderers | Total | | 62 | 11 | 3 | 2 | 2 | 0 | 1 | 0 | 68 | 13 |
| Notts County (loan) | 2018–19 | League Two | 16 | 3 | — | | — | | — | | 16 | 3 |
| Stevenage (loan) | 2019–20 | League Two | 18 | 0 | 1 | 0 | — | | 4 | 1 | 23 | 1 |
| Bedford Town | 2020–21 | Southern League Division One Central | 6 | 2 | — | | — | | 2 | 0 | 8 | 2 |
| Career total | | | 590 | 165 | 33 | 14 | 14 | 7 | 37 | 10 | 674 | 196 |

=== International ===
Appearances and goals by national team and year
| National team | Year | Apps | Goals |
|---|---|---|---|
| Scotland | 2011 | 5 | 1 |
| Scotland | 2012 | 2 | 0 |
| Total | | 7 | 1 |

Scores and results list Scotland's goal tally first, score column indicates score after each Mackail-Smith goal.

List of international goals scored by Craig Mackail-Smith
| No. | Date | Venue | Cap | Opponent | Score | Result | Competition | Ref. |
|---|---|---|---|---|---|---|---|---|
| 1 | 8 October 2011 | Rheinpark Stadion, Vaduz, Liechtenstein | 3 | Liechtenstein | 1–0 | 1–0 | UEFA Euro 2012 qualifying | |

== Honours ==
Peterborough United

- Football League One runner-up: 2008–09; play-offs: 2011
- Football League Two runner-up: 2007–08

Bedford Town

- Southern Football League Division One Central: 2021–22

Individual

- Football League One Player of the Year: 2010–11
- PFA Team of the Year: 2010–11 League One
- Football League One Golden Boot: 2010–11

== See also ==
- List of Scotland international footballers born outside Scotland
- List of sportspeople who competed for more than one nation
