= Ashley Barnes =

English footballer (born 1989)

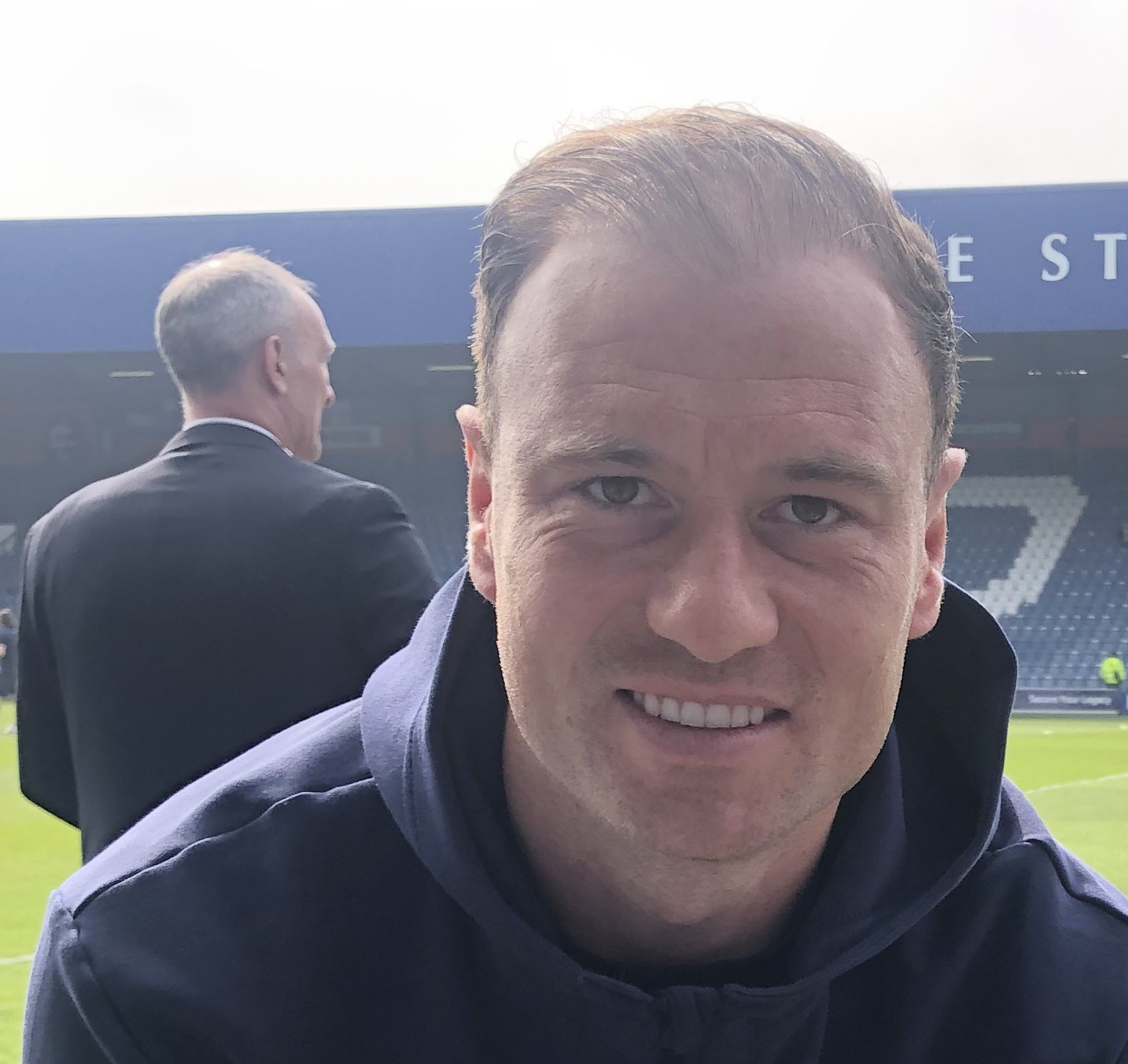
- Barnes in 2025

Personal information
- Full name: Ashley Luke Barnes
- Date of birth: 30 October 1989 (age 37)
- Place of birth: Bath, England
- Height: 6 ft 1 in (1.86 m)
- Position: Striker

Team information
- Current team: Burnley
- Number: 35

Senior career*
Years	Team	Apps	(Gls)
–2007	Paulton Rovers		
2007–2010	Plymouth Argyle	22	(2)
2007	→ Oxford United (loan)	3	(0)
2008	→ Salisbury City (loan)	5	(0)
2008–2009	→ Eastbourne Borough (loan)	8	(5)
2010	→ Torquay United (loan)	6	(0)
2010	→ Brighton & Hove Albion (loan)	8	(4)
2010–2014	Brighton & Hove Albion	141	(42)
2014–2023	Burnley	268	(51)
2023–2025	Norwich City	43	(6)
2025–	Burnley	20	(1)

International career
2008	Austria U20	1	(0)
- * Club domestic league appearances and goals as of 11:39, 28 May 2026 (UTC)

Ashley Luke Barnes (born 30 October 1989) is a professional footballer who plays as a striker for EFL Championship club Burnley.

Barnes previously played for Paulton Rovers, Plymouth Argyle, Oxford United, Salisbury City, Eastbourne Borough, Torquay United, Brighton & Hove Albion and Norwich City. He was capped by Austria at youth international level, making one appearance for their under-20 team in 2008, but his application for Austrian citizenship was rejected in 2019.

== Club career ==
=== Early career and Plymouth Argyle ===
As a child, Barnes played for Bath Arsenal, where his teammates included fellow future professional Scott Sinclair and was briefly in the academy of Bristol Rovers before being released. He began his senior career as a prolific goalscorer with local club Paulton Rovers of the Southern League. He had an extended trial with Championship club Plymouth Argyle in March 2007, and sufficiently impressed to be awarded with an eighteen-month contract by the club, having scored several goals for the reserve team. He made his Plymouth debut in the first round of the League Cup in August 2007 against Wycombe Wanderers, coming on as a substitute for first-team regular Sylvan Ebanks-Blake.

He subsequently found first-team opportunities hard to come by, and was sent on loan to Conference side Oxford United in November 2007 to gain some experience. Barnes featured five times for Oxford United, including two FA Cup ties against Southend United, before returning to Plymouth. He was sent out on loan again in March 2008 to another Conference club, this time to Salisbury City. He featured in five league matches for the club but did not find the back of the net.

Barnes was loaned out for a third time in November 2008 to Eastbourne Borough, with teammate Daniel Smith. He impressed enough for his loan to be extended by a month, before he was recalled by Plymouth Argyle in January 2009, ahead of the club's match against Bristol City. He made his league debut for the Pilgrims against Wolves at Molineux, scoring his first goal for the club against Coventry City. His performances at the back-end of the 2008–09 season were rewarded when he signed a two-year contract extension in May 2009.

He joined League Two club Torquay United on loan until the end of the season in February 2010, but returned a month later having made six appearances.

=== Brighton & Hove Albion ===
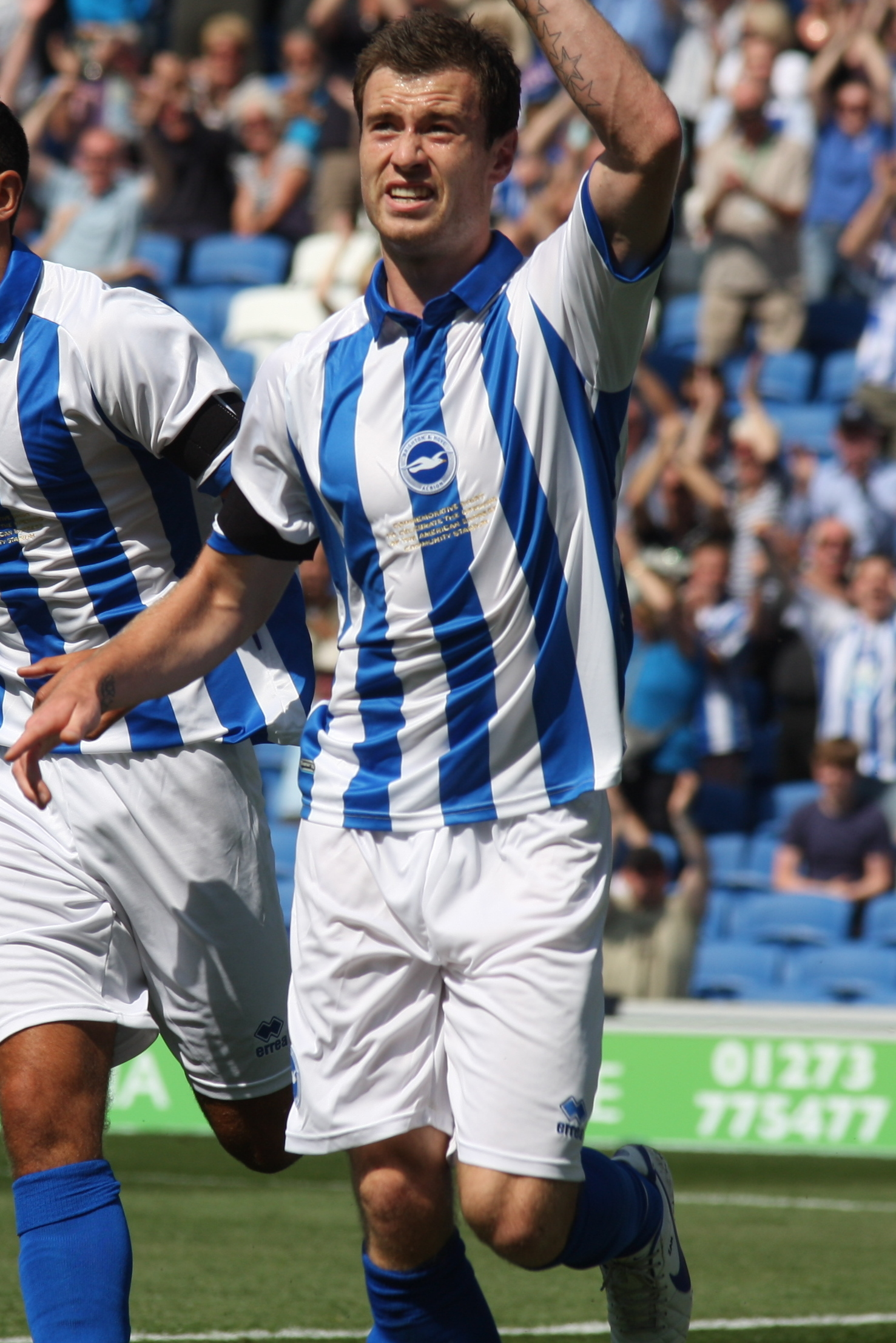
Barnes playing for Brighton & Hove Albion in 2011

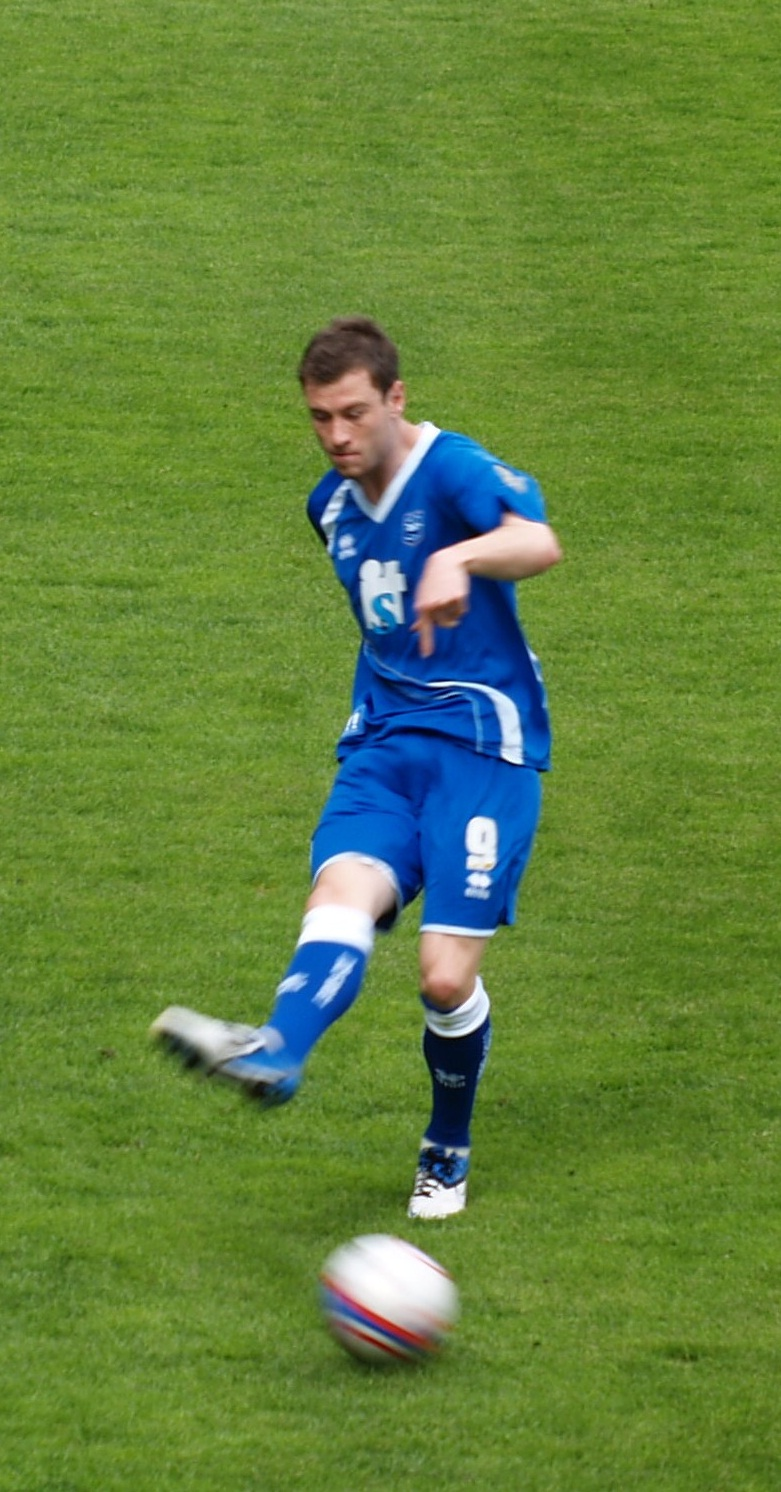
Barnes playing for Brighton & Hove Albion in 2011

Barnes subsequently joined League One club Brighton & Hove Albion on loan until the end of the season. He scored on his debut against Tranmere Rovers two days later, having been introduced as a substitute ten minutes earlier.

On 8 July 2010, Barnes signed a two-year contract with Brighton & Hove Albion after transferring for an undisclosed fee from Plymouth Argyle. On 12 April 2011, he scored the decisive goal in a 4–3 win at home against Dagenham & Redbridge, which confirmed their promotion to the Championship. Barnes finished the season as Brighton's second-top goalscorer behind Glenn Murray, with 20 goals in 49 appearances.

In the 2011–12 season Barnes remained a first-choice striker for Brighton's return to the Championship. He finished the season as Brighton's leading goalscorer with 14 goals in all competitions, 11 in the league.

On 9 March 2013, Barnes received a red card in stoppage time against Bolton Wanderers for attempting to trip up the referee. He was subsequently handed a seven-match suspension by the Football Association. Fans and manager Gus Poyet were critical of Barnes for this action as it left the club with only one senior striker available to play, as Craig Mackail-Smith and Will Hoskins were already injured for the rest of the season. On his return from the ban on 20 April, Barnes scored two goals in a 6–1 win over Blackpool and was named man of the match.

=== Burnley ===
On 10 January 2014, Barnes joined Burnley for an undisclosed fee on a three-and-a-half-year deal. On 8 November, he scored the only goal at Turf Moor to defeat Hull City and gain Burnley's first win of the Premier League season. He scored a second goal on 13 December, the sole goal in a home victory over Southampton to take Burnley out of the relegation zone. In November 2019, Barnes signed a new contract with Burnley until June 2022.

In February 2015, Barnes performed a high tackle on Chelsea's Nemanja Matić, who was sent off for pushing him in retaliation. Barnes did not receive a booking for the challenge, and The FA confirmed that they would not take retrospective action as that was not normal procedure for attempted tackles. Barnes was publicly criticised by Chelsea manager José Mourinho, and said of the criticism "I found that hilarious".

On 24 May 2015, as relegated Burnley finished the season with a win over Aston Villa, Barnes was taken off with knee cruciate ligament injuries, which would rule him out for the majority of the following campaign.

On 3 March 2018, he wrote himself into the history books, scoring his 16th goal in the Premier League to secure a 2–1 victory for Burnley against Everton. His 16th goal, and his 6th of the season, made him Burnley's leading scorer in the Premier League since it was formed in 1992.

On 13 April 2019, Barnes was booked "in the strangest of circumstances" for kissing defender Joe Bennett during a match against Cardiff City.

On 21 January 2021, Barnes scored the only goal via a penalty in a 1–0 away league win over champions Liverpool, handing them their first league defeat at Anfield in 68 matches and sealed the Clarets' first win at Liverpool since 1974. This ended Liverpool's unbeaten home run in the league which stretched back to April 2017. With Barnes also totalling the 100th goal of his senior career.

His 50th league goal for Burnley in a 2–1 away win against Middlesbrough helped to seal Burnley's promotion back to the Premier League at the first attempt. This was Barnes' third promotion to the top flight with Burnley. Post-match, Barnes confirmed that he would leave Burnley at the end of his contract in June 2023 after nine years with the club. He scored for Burnley on his final appearance for the club in a 3–0 win against Cardiff City at Turf Moor and received a standing ovation as he departed the field.

=== Norwich City ===
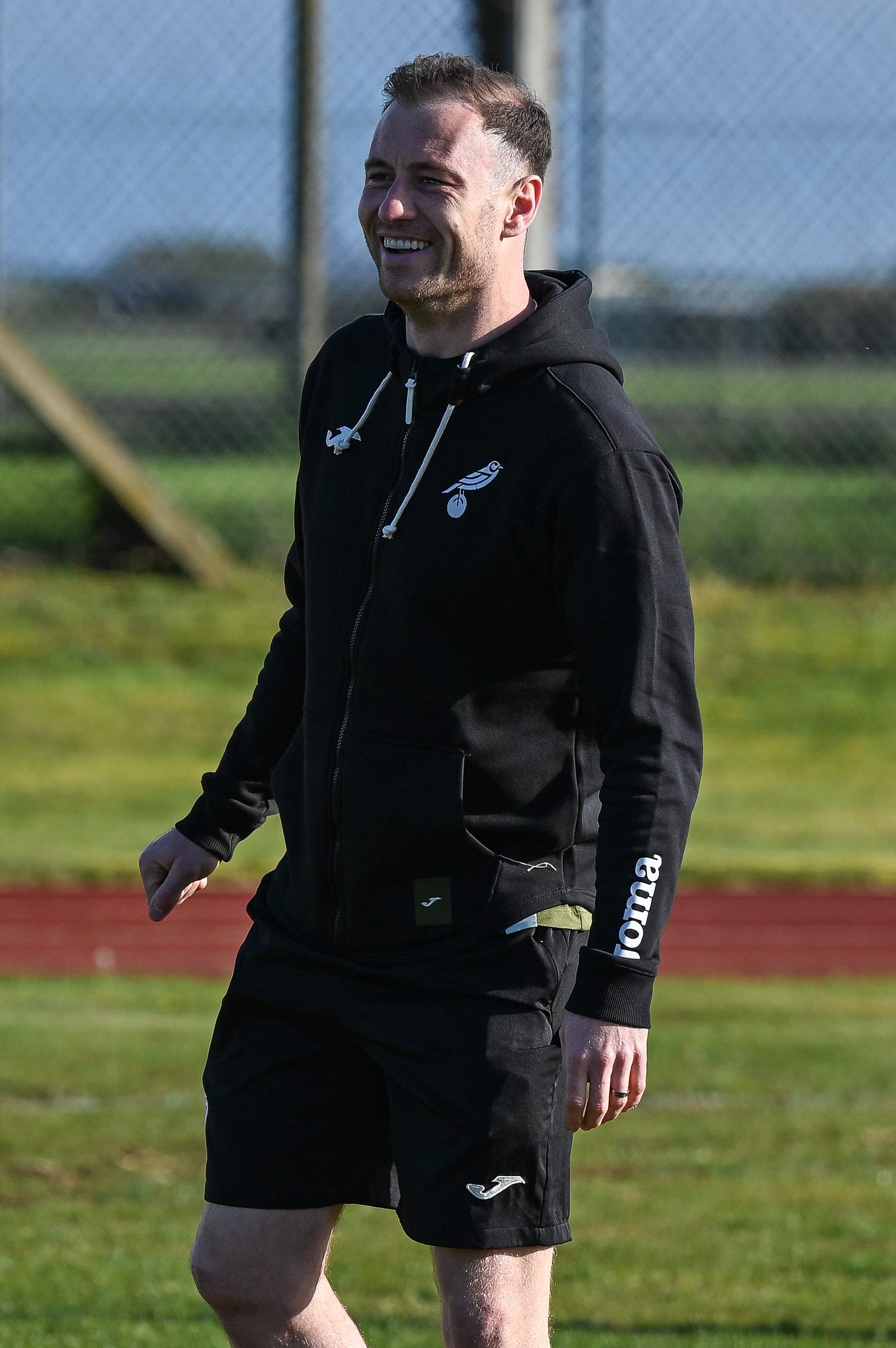
Barnes in 2024 in Norwich

On 17 May 2023, Norwich City announced the signing of Barnes, effective upon expiry of his Burnley contract on 1 July. He made his debut for them in the first match of the season on 5 August, starting in a 2–1 win against Hull alongside fellow striker Josh Sargent, although it was Adam Idah, the player who replaced him as a substitute, who scored the winning goal. He remained in the starting line-up and scored his first goal for Norwich on 20 August against Millwall and added a second with a penalty in the following match against Huddersfield Town. His run in the first team ended on 20 September when he was injured in a 2–0 defeat to Leicester City. He returned to the side on 25 November, starting a 1–0 win over Queens Park Rangers. He would play in the majority of Norwich's remaining games, appearing in 35 of the 46 league games (including 5 as a substitute) and contributing 6 league goals, as well as scoring in an FA Cup tie with Bristol Rovers. Norwich finished the season in sixth and qualified for the Championship play-offs, but they would end in embarrassment for Norwich, with Barnes making what would be one of his last appearances for the club in a 4–0 defeat at Leeds United.

Following the end of the season, Barnes underwent surgery for a calf injury. Although he had hoped to return sooner, a setback meant he missed the first three months of the season. He finally returned to the side when he came on as an 83rd-minute substitute for Borja Sainz in a 6–1 win over his old club Plymouth on 26 November 2024. However, he failed to regain his place in the side, with his only start being in a 0–0 draw against Portsmouth on 10 December, where he was substituted for Onel Hernandez after 68 minutes. His other seven appearances of the season were all as a substitute, with him making his last appearance on 1 January 2025, coincidentally as a 68th-minute substitute for Hernandez, in a 1–0 win over Luton Town.

=== Return to Burnley ===
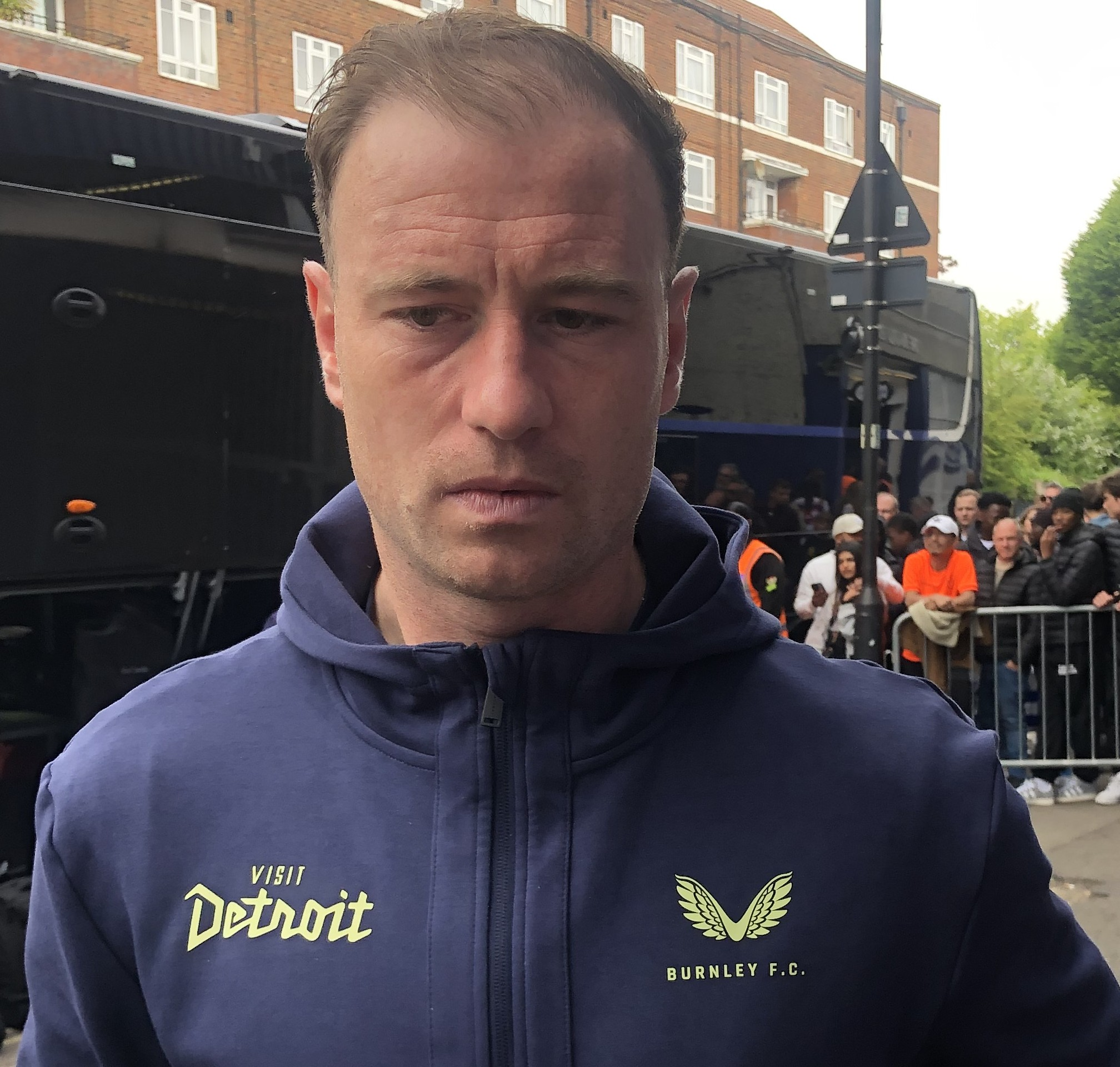
Barnes in his second spell at Burnley.

On 2 January 2025, Barnes rejoined Burnley on a free transfer until 30 June 2025 after leaving Norwich via mutual consent.

On 20 May 2025, Burnley said it was discussing a new contract with the player.

== International career ==
While born in Bath to English parents, it was believed that Barnes could qualify to represent Austria courtesy of his paternal grandmother, who was from Klagenfurt, if he were able to acquire Austrian citizenship. He was spotted by Austrian officials while on a pre-season tour with Plymouth Argyle in July 2008, and as a result he was called up to their Under-20 team to face Switzerland on 19 August 2008; the match was part of a four nation friendly tournament featuring Austria, Germany, Italy, and Switzerland. Barnes made his debut as a substitute in the 73rd minute replacing FC Wacker Innsbruck's Julius Perstaller in front of 250 spectators.

Barnes said in April 2015 that he had had no further contact with the Austrian Football Association, and stated that he was open to representing either England or Austria at senior level if given the opportunity. In March 2017, whilst playing in the Premier League for Burnley, he again confirmed apparent eligibility for both England and Austria, and expressed a desire to represent the Austria national senior side. His form in the 2017–18 season led to calls in Austria for him to receive a national team call-up, and manager Franco Foda confirmed in March 2018 that he was monitoring Barnes.

Barnes started his application for naturalisation as an Austrian citizen in 2018, but it was ultimately unsuccessful after it was rejected by the Austrian Ministry of the Interior in February 2019, thus confirming his ineligibility to represent Austria.

== Personal life ==
Barnes is from Dunkerton, Somerset, near Bath. He attended Writhlington School, near Bath.

In 2019, Burnley grime artist Bacchus released a song titled 'Ashley Barnes' dedicated to the footballer and his gamesmanship.

== Career statistics ==
As of match played 24 May 2026

Appearances and goals by club, season and competition
Club	Season	League			FA Cup		League Cup		Other		Total	
Club	Season	Division	Apps	Goals	Apps	Goals	Apps	Goals	Apps	Goals	Apps	Goals
Plymouth Argyle	2007–08	Championship	0	0	—		1	0	—		1	0
Plymouth Argyle	2008–09	Championship	15	1	0	0	0	0	—		15	1
Plymouth Argyle	2009–10	Championship	7	1	1	0	1	0	—		9	1
Plymouth Argyle	Total		22	2	1	0	2	0	—		25	2
Oxford United (loan)	2007–08	Conference Premier	2	0	2	0	—		3 (Note: Two appearances in FA Trophy, one appearance in Conference League Cup)	0	7	0
Salisbury City (loan)	2007–08	Conference Premier	5	0	—		—		—		5	0
Eastbourne Borough (loan)	2008–09	Conference Premier	8	5	—		—		1 (Note: Appearance in FA Trophy)	0	9	5
Torquay United (loan)	2009–10	League Two	6	0	—		—		—		6	0
Brighton & Hove Albion (loan)	2009–10	League One	8	4	—		—		—		8	4
Brighton & Hove Albion	2010–11	League One	42	18	6	2	0	0	1 (Note: Appearance in Football League Trophy)	0	49	20
Brighton & Hove Albion	2011–12	Championship	43	11	4	1	3	2	—		50	14
Brighton & Hove Albion	2012–13	Championship	34	8	2	1	1	0	2 (Note: Appearance(s) in Championship play-offs)	0	39	9
Brighton & Hove Albion	2013–14	Championship	22	5	1	0	1	1	—		24	6
Brighton & Hove Albion	Total		149	46	13	4	5	3	3	0	170	53
Burnley	2013–14	Championship	21	3	—		—		—		21	3
Burnley	2014–15	Premier League	35	5	1	0	1	0	—		37	5
Burnley	2015–16	Championship	8	0	0	0	0	0	—		8	0
Burnley	2016–17	Premier League	28	6	3	0	0	0	—		31	6
Burnley	2017–18	Premier League	36	9	1	1	2	0	—		39	10
Burnley	2018–19	Premier League	37	12	0	0	1	0	5 (Note: Appearances in UEFA Europa League)	1	43	13
Burnley	2019–20	Premier League	19	6	0	0	0	0	—		19	6
Burnley	2020–21	Premier League	22	3	2	0	1	0	—		25	3
Burnley	2021–22	Premier League	23	1	0	0	2	0	—		25	1
Burnley	2022–23	Championship	39	6	3	0	3	1	—		45	7
Burnley	Total		268	51	10	1	10	1	5	1	293	54
Norwich City	2023–24	Championship	35	6	3	1	2	0	1	0	41	7
Norwich City	2024–25	Championship	8	0	—		0	0	—		8	0
Norwich City	Total		43	6	3	1	2	0	1	0	49	7
Burnley	2024–25	Championship	13	1	3	0	—		—		16	1
Burnley	2025–26	Premier League	7	0	2	2	2	0	—		11	2
Burnley	Total		20	1	5	2	2	0	—		27	3
Career total			523	111	34	8	21	4	13	1	591	124

== Honours ==
Brighton & Hove Albion

- Football League One: 2010–11

Burnley

- Football League Championship / EFL Championship: 2015–16, 2022–23; second-place promotion: 2013–14
