= 2000–01 Isthmian League =

The 2000–01 season was the 86th season of the Isthmian League, which is an English football competition featuring semi-professional and amateur clubs from London, East and South East England. The league consisted of four divisions.

== Premier Division ==
Isthmian League Premier Division
- Season: 2000–01
- Champions: Farnborough Town
- Promoted: Farnborough Town
- Relegated: Carshalton Athletic; Dulwich Hamlet; Slough Town
- Matches: 459
- Goals: 1,348 (2.94 per match)
- Highest attendance: 3,478 – Farnborough Town – Aldershot Town, (26 December)
- Total attendance: 203,197
- Average attendance: 443 (-17.7% to previous season)

The Premier Division consisted of 22 clubs, including 18 clubs from the previous season and four new clubs:

- Croydon, promoted as champions of Division One
- Grays Athletic, promoted as runners-up in Division One
- Maidenhead United, promoted as third in Division One
- Sutton United, relegated from the Football Conference

Farnborough Town won the division and returned to the Football Conference after two seasons spent in Isthmian League. Slough Town, Carshalton Athletic and Dulwich Hamlet finished bottom of the table and relegated to Division One. Three fixtures left unfulfilled due to bad weather conditions.

=== League table ===
Pos	Team	Pld	W	D	L	GF	GA	GD	Pts	Promotion or relegation
1	Farnborough Town	42	31	6	5	86	27	+59	99	Promoted to the Football Conference
2	Canvey Island	42	27	8	7	79	41	+38	89	
3	Basingstoke Town	42	22	13	7	73	40	+33	79	
4	Aldershot Town	41	21	11	9	73	39	+34	74 (Note: Unfulfilled fixtures: Aldershot Town v Billericay Town, Hendon v Harrow Borough and Sutton United v Hendon.)	
5	Chesham United	42	22	6	14	78	52	+26	72	
6	Gravesend & Northfleet	42	22	5	15	63	46	+17	71	
7	Heybridge Swifts	42	18	13	11	74	60	+14	67	
8	Billericay Town	41	18	13	10	62	54	+8	67	
9	Hampton & Richmond	42	18	12	12	73	60	+13	66	
10	Hitchin Town	42	18	5	19	72	69	+3	59	
11	Purfleet	42	14	13	15	55	55	0	55	
12	Hendon	40	16	6	18	62	62	0	54	
13	Sutton United	41	14	11	16	74	70	+4	53	
14	St Albans City	42	15	5	22	50	69	−19	50	
15	Grays Athletic	42	14	8	20	49	68	−19	50	
16	Maidenhead United	42	15	2	25	47	63	−16	47	
17	Croydon	42	12	10	20	55	77	−22	46	
18	Enfield	42	12	9	21	48	74	−26	45	
19	Harrow Borough	41	10	11	20	62	91	−29	41	
20	Slough Town	42	10	9	23	40	62	−22	39	Relegated to Division One
21	Carshalton Athletic	42	10	6	26	40	85	−45	36	Relegated to Division One
22	Dulwich Hamlet	42	4	10	28	33	84	−51	22	Relegated to Division One

Source: fchd.com rsssf.com
Rules for classification: 1) points; 2) goal difference; 3) number of goals scored.

=== Stadia and locations ===
Locations of the Premier Division clubs
Greater London Premier Division football clubs

Club	Stadium
Aldershot Town	Recreation Ground
Basingstoke Town	The Camrose
Billericay Town	New Lodge
Canvey Island	Brockwell Stadium
Carshalton Athletic	War Memorial Sports Ground
Croydon	Croydon Sports Arena
Chesham United	The Meadow
Enfield	Meadow Park (groundshare with Boreham Wood)
Dulwich Hamlet	Champion Hill
Farnborough Town	Cherrywood Road
Gravesend & Northfleet	Stonebridge Road
Grays Athletic	New Recreation Ground
Hampton & Richmond Borough	Beveree Stadium
Harrow Borough	Earlsmead Stadium
Hendon	Claremont Road
Heybridge Swifts	Scraley Road
Hitchin Town	Top Field
Maidenhead United	York Road
Slough Town	Wexham Park
St Albans City	Clarence Park
Sutton United	Gander Green Lane
Thurrock	Ship Lane

== Division One ==
Isthmian League Division One
- Season: 2000–01
- Champions: Boreham Wood
- Promoted: Boreham Wood; Bedford Town; Braintree Town
- Relegated: Barton Rovers; Leatherhead; Romford
- Matches: 462
- Goals: 1,525 (3.3 per match)
- Highest attendance: 1,004 – Aylesbury United – Staines Town, (5 May)
- Total attendance: 103,004
- Average attendance: 223 (-0.4% to previous season)

Division One consisted of 22 clubs, including 17 clubs from the previous season and five new clubs: Three clubs relegated from the Premier Division:

- Aylesbury United
- Boreham Wood
- Walton & Hersham

Two clubs promoted from Division Two:

- Ford United
- Northwood

Initially, champions of Division Two Hemel Hempstead Town were to be promoted to Division One, but later they were refused due to ground grading. Leatherhead finished in the relegation zone were reprieved.

Boreham Wood won the division and returned to the Premier Division at the first attempt. Bedford Town and Braintree Town also get a promotion. Leatherhead finished in the relegation zone the second time in a row and were relegated along with Romford and Barton Rovers.

=== League table ===
Pos	Team	Pld	W	D	L	GF	GA	GD	Pts	Promotion or relegation
1	Boreham Wood	42	26	7	9	82	49	+33	85	Promoted to the Premier Division
2	Bedford Town	42	22	16	4	81	40	+41	82	Promoted to the Premier Division
3	Braintree Town	42	25	6	11	112	60	+52	81	Promoted to the Premier Division
4	Bishop's Stortford	42	24	6	12	103	76	+27	78	
5	Thame United	42	22	8	12	86	54	+32	74	
6	Ford United	42	19	12	11	70	58	+12	69	
7	Uxbridge	42	21	5	16	73	55	+18	68	
8	Northwood	42	20	8	14	89	81	+8	68	
9	Whyteleafe	42	20	6	16	62	69	−7	66	
10	Oxford City	42	16	13	13	64	49	+15	61	
11	Harlow Town	42	15	16	11	70	66	+4	61	
12	Worthing	42	16	9	17	69	69	0	57	
13	Staines Town	42	16	8	18	60	66	−6	56	
14	Aylesbury United	42	17	4	21	65	55	+10	55	
15	Yeading	42	15	9	18	72	74	−2	54	
16	Bognor Regis Town	42	13	11	18	71	71	0	50	
17	Walton & Hersham	42	14	8	20	59	80	−21	50	
18	Bromley	42	14	6	22	63	86	−23	48	
19	Wealdstone	42	12	9	21	54	73	−19	45	
20	Leatherhead	42	12	4	26	37	87	−50	40	Relegated to Division Two
21	Romford	42	9	4	29	53	113	−60	31	Relegated to Division Two
22	Barton Rovers	42	2	9	31	30	94	−64	15	Relegated to Division Two

Source: fchd.com rsssf.com
Rules for classification: 1) points; 2) goal difference; 3) number of goals scored.

=== Stadia and locations ===
Locations of the Division One clubs
Greater London Division One football clubs

Club	Stadium
Aylesbury United	Buckingham Road
Barton Rovers	Sharpenhoe Road
Bedford Town	The Eyrie
Bishop's Stortford	Woodside Park
Bognor Regis Town	Nyewood Lane
Boreham Wood	Meadow Park
Braintree Town	Cressing Road
Bromley	Hayes Lane
Ford United	Oakside
Harlow Town	Harlow Sportcentre
Leatherhead	Fetcham Grove
Northwood	Chestnut Avenue
Oxford City	Marsh Lane
Romford	Sungate
Staines Town	Wheatsheaf Park
Thame United	Windmill Road
Uxbridge	Honeycroft
Walton & Hersham	The Sports Ground
Wealdstone	White Lion (groundshare with Edgware Town)
Whyteleafe	Church Road
Worthing	Woodside Road
Yeading	The Warren

== Division Two ==
Isthmian League Division Two
- Season: 2000–01
- Champions: Tooting & Mitcham United
- Promoted: Barking; Tooting & Mitcham United; Windsor & Eton
- Relegated: Edgware Town; Leighton Town; Wokingham Town
- Matches: 462
- Goals: 1,386 (3 per match)
- Highest attendance: 405 – Horsham – Tilbury, (4 November)
- Total attendance: 48,378
- Average attendance: 105 (-0.9% to previous season)

Division Two consisted of 22 clubs, including 17 clubs from the previous season and five new teams:

Two clubs relegated from Division One:

- Chertsey Town
- Leyton Pennant

Three clubs promoted from Division Three:

- East Thurrock United
- Great Wakering Rovers
- Tilbury

Initially, previous season champions of Division Two Hemel Hempstead Town were to be promoted to Division One, but later they were refused due to ground grading and stayed in the division.

Tooting & Mitcham United won the division and were promoted to Division One along with Windsor & Eton and Barking. Later, Barking ceased to exist when they merged with East Ham United (11° Essex Senior League) to form Barking & East Ham United, taken place of Barking in Division One.

=== League table ===
Pos	Team	Pld	W	D	L	GF	GA	GD	Pts	Promotion or relegation
1	Tooting & Mitcham United	42	26	11	5	92	35	+57	89	Promoted to Division One
2	Windsor & Eton	42	24	10	8	70	40	+30	82	Promoted to Division One
3	Barking	42	23	13	6	82	54	+28	82 (Note: At the end of the season Barking ceased to exist when they merged with East Ham United to form Barking & East Ham United.)	Promoted to Division One and ceased to exist when they merged with East Ham United to form Barking & East Ham United
4	Berkhamsted Town	42	24	8	10	99	49	+50	80	
5	Wivenhoe Town	42	23	11	8	78	52	+26	80	
6	Hemel Hempstead Town	42	22	10	10	74	44	+30	76	
7	Horsham	42	19	9	14	84	61	+23	66	
8	Chertsey Town	42	18	9	15	59	59	0	63	
9	Great Wakering Rovers	42	16	13	13	69	59	+10	61	
10	Tilbury	42	18	6	18	61	67	−6	60	
11	Banstead Athletic	42	17	8	17	69	58	+11	59	
12	East Thurrock United	42	16	11	15	72	64	+8	59	
13	Metropolitan Police	42	18	4	20	64	77	−13	58	
14	Marlow	42	15	11	16	62	61	+1	56	
15	Molesey	42	14	9	19	53	61	−8	51	
16	Wembley	42	12	10	20	39	63	−24	46	
17	Hungerford Town	42	11	9	22	40	73	−33	42	
18	Leyton Pennant	42	10	11	21	47	74	−27	41	
19	Cheshunt	42	11	6	25	48	77	−29	39	
20	Edgware Town	42	9	9	24	41	77	−36	36	Relegated to Division Three
21	Leighton Town	42	8	10	24	44	87	−43	34	Relegated to Division Three
22	Wokingham Town	42	3	12	27	39	94	−55	20 (Note: Wokingham Town deducted one point.)	Relegated to Division Three

Source: fchd.com rsssf.com
Rules for classification: 1) points; 2) goal difference; 3) number of goals scored.

=== Stadia and locations ===
Locations of the Division Two clubs
Greater London Division Two football clubs

Club	Stadium
Banstead Athletic	Merland Rise
Barking	Mayesbrook Park
Berkhamsted Town	Broadwater
Chertsey Town	Alwyns Lane
Cheshunt	Cheshunt Stadium
East Thurrock United	Rookery Hill
Edgware Town	White Lion
Great Wakering Rovers	Burroughs Park
Hemel Hempstead Town	Vauxhall Road
Horsham	Queen Street
Hungerford Town	Bulpit Lane
Leighton Town	Bell Close
Leyton Pennant	Wadham Lodge
Marlow	Alfred Davis Memorial Ground
Metropolitan Police	Imber Court
Molesey	Walton Road Stadium
Tilbury	Chadfields
Tooting & Mitcham United	Imperial Fields
Wembley	Vale Farm
Windsor & Eton	Stag Meadow
Wivenhoe Town	Broad Lane
Wokingham Town	Cantley Park

== Division Three ==
Isthmian League Division Three
- Season: 2000–01
- Champions: Arlesey Town
- Promoted: Arlesey Town; Ashford Town; Lewes
- Matches: 460
- Goals: 1,642 (3.57 per match)
- Highest attendance: 323 – Hertford Town – Ware, (16 April)
- Total attendance: 34,714
- Average attendance: 75 (-8.5% to previous season)

Division Three consisted of 22 clubs, including 17 clubs from the previous season and five new teams:

- Arlesey Town, promoted as champions of the Spartan South Midlands League
- Ashford Town, promoted as champions of the Combined Counties League
- Chalfont St Peter, relegated from Division Two
- Wingate & Finchley, relegated from Division Two
- Witham Town, relegated from Division Two

Arlesey Town and Ashford Town both debuted in the league and achieved a promotion along with Lewes. Two fixtures left unfulfilled due to bad weather conditions.

=== League table ===
Pos	Team	Pld	W	D	L	GF	GA	GD	Pts	Promotion or relegation
1	Arlesey Town	42	34	6	2	138	37	+101	108	Promoted to Division Two
2	Lewes	41	25	11	5	104	34	+70	86 (Note: Unfulfilled fixtures: Croydon Athletic v Bracknell Town and Lewes v Hertford Town.)	Promoted to Division Two
3	Ashford Town	42	26	7	9	102	49	+53	85	Promoted to Division Two
4	Flackwell Heath	42	24	10	8	93	51	+42	82	
5	Corinthian-Casuals	42	24	10	8	83	50	+33	82	
6	Aveley	42	24	3	15	85	61	+24	75	
7	Epsom & Ewell	42	23	4	15	76	52	+24	73	
8	Witham Town	42	21	9	12	76	57	+19	72	
9	Bracknell Town	41	19	10	12	90	70	+20	67	
10	Croydon Athletic	41	15	12	14	78	63	+15	57	
11	Ware	42	17	6	19	75	76	−1	57	
12	Tring Town	42	16	9	17	60	71	−11	57	
13	Egham Town	42	15	11	16	60	60	0	56	
14	Hornchurch	42	14	13	15	73	60	+13	55	
15	Wingate & Finchley	42	15	7	20	75	75	0	52	
16	Kingsbury Town	42	11	8	23	74	100	−26	41	
17	Abingdon Town	42	12	7	23	53	102	−49	40 (Note: Abingdon Town deducted three points.)	
18	Dorking	42	10	9	23	59	99	−40	39	
19	Hertford Town	41	9	8	24	57	97	−40	35	
20	Camberley Town	42	8	8	26	53	107	−54	32	
21	Clapton	42	5	9	28	48	121	−73	24	
22	Chalfont St Peter	42	4	1	37	30	150	−120	13	

Source: fchd.com rsssf.com
Rules for classification: 1) points; 2) goal difference; 3) number of goals scored.

=== Stadia and locations ===
Locations of the Division Three clubs
Greater London Division Three football clubs

Club	Stadium
Arlesey Town	Hitchin Road
Ashford Town	Short Lane
Abingdon Town	Culham Road
Aveley	The Mill Field
Bracknell Town	Larges Lane
Camberley Town	Kroomer Park
Chalfont St Peter	Mill Meadow
Clapton	The Old Spotted Dog Ground
Corinthian-Casuals	King George's Field
Croydon Athletic	Keith Tuckey Stadium
Dorking	Meadowbank Stadium
Egham Town	The Runnymede Stadium
Epsom & Ewell	Merland Rise (groundshare with Banstead Athletic)
Flackwell Heath	Wilks Park
Hertford Town	Hertingfordbury Park
Hornchurch	Hornchurch Stadium
Kingsbury Town	Avenue Park
Lewes	The Dripping Pan
Tring Town	Pendley Ground
Ware	Wodson Park
Wingate & Finchley	The Harry Abrahams Stadium
Witham Town	Spa Road

== See also ==
- Isthmian League
- 2000–01 Northern Premier League
- 2000–01 Southern Football League
