= 2012–13 Brighton & Hove Albion F.C. season =

112th season in existence of Brighton & Hove Albion

Brighton & Hove Albion F.C.
2012–13 season
- Chairman: Tony Bloom
- Manager: Gus Poyet
- Stadium: Falmer Stadium
- Championship: 4th (eliminated in play-off semi finals)
- FA Cup: Fourth round (eliminated by Arsenal)
- League Cup: First round (eliminated by Swindon Town)
- Top goalscorer: League: Craig Mackail-Smith (11); All: Craig Mackail-Smith (11)
- Highest home attendance: 30,003 (vs. Wolverhampton Wanderers, 4 May 2013)
- Lowest home attendance: 21,704
- Average home league attendance: 26,212
Home colours	Away colours

The 2012–13 season was Brighton & Hove Albion's fourth year in the Championship and their second at Falmer Stadium. The club returned to the Championship for the second consecutive season after finishing 10th in the 2011–12 season. The club competed in the 2012–13 League Cup losing in the first round to Swindon Town and they were also defeated in the fifth round of the 2013 FA Cup by Arsenal 3–2.

The club made it to the Championship playoffs for the first time since 1991, however they were eliminated at the semifinal stage following a 2–0 defeat to bitter rivals Crystal Palace at Falmer Stadium. This was followed two days later by the suspension of manager Gus Poyet and his assistants.

== Pre-season ==
=== Friendlies ===
14 July 2012	Maidstone United	0–5	Brighton & Hove Albion	Maidstone
15:00			25' Mackail-Smith; 50' Hoskins; 58', 62', 67' Barnes	Stadium: The Gallagher Stadium; Attendance: 2,226

17 July 2012	Lewes	0–3	Brighton & Hove Albion	Lewes
19:45			45' Barnes; 66' (pen.) Hoskins; 77' Agdestein	Stadium: The Dripping Pan

28 July 2012	Córdoba	0–0	Brighton & Hove Albion	Córdoba
15:00				Stadium: Nuevo Arcángel

4 August 2012	Brighton & Hove Albion	3–1	Chelsea	Brighton
15:00	Vicente 37'; Barnes 45'; Crofts 87'		35' Lampard	Stadium: Falmer Stadium; Attendance: 17,149; Referee: Dave Phillips

7 August 2012 Michel Kuipers; Testimonial	Brighton & Hove Albion	1–1	Reading	Brighton
19:45 BST (UTC+1)	Vicente 32'	Report	Robson-Kanu 89'	Stadium: Falmer Stadium; Attendance: 8,107

== Transfers ==
=== In ===
No.	Pos.	Nat.	Name	Age	EU	Moving from	Type	Transfer window	Ends	Transfer fee	Source
29	GK	(Poland)	Tomasz Kuszczak	30	EU	Manchester United	Free	Summer	2014	Free	BBC Sport
2	DF	(Spain)	Bruno	31	EU	Valencia (Spain)	Free	Summer	2014	Free	Official Site
28	DF	(England)	Wayne Bridge	31	EU	Manchester City	Loan	Summer	2013	Season-long	Sky Sports
8	MF	(Wales) (England)	Andrew Crofts	28	EU	Norwich City	Transfer	Summer	2015	Undisclosed	BBC Sport
11	MF	(Spain)	Andrea Orlandi	28	EU	Swansea City (Wales)	Transfer	Summer	2014	Undisclosed	BBC Sport
10	FW	(Scotland)	Stephen Dobbie	29	EU	Swansea City (Wales)	Transfer	Summer	2015	Undisclosed	BBC Sport
4	MF	(England)	Dean Hammond	29	EU	Southampton	Loan	Summer	2013	Season-long	BBC Sport
21	MF	(Spain)	David López	29	EU	Athletic Bilbao (Spain)	Free	Summer	2013	Free	BBC Sport
	DF	(Latvia)	Vitalijs Maksimenko	22	EU	Skonto FC (Latvia)	Free	Winter	Undisclosed	Undisclosed	Sky Sports
24	FW	(Argentina)	Leonardo Ulloa	26	EU	Almería (Spain)	Transfer	Winter	2017	£2,000,000	BBC Sport
	MF	(Iceland)	Emil Asmundssen	18	EU	Fylkir (Iceland)	Transfer	Winter	2015	Undisclosed	BBC Sport
	DF	(England)	Matthew Upson	33	EU	Stoke City	Loan	Winter	2013	Season Long Loan	BBC Sport

=== Out ===
Tommy Elphick, n4 afc Bournemouth, summer

No.	Pos.	Name	Country	Age	Type	Moving to	Transfer window	Transfer fee	Apps	Goals	Source
21	GK	David González	(Colombia)	29	Contract Ended	Barnsley	Summer	Free	2	0	BBC Sport
19	GK	Michael Poke	(England)	26	Contract Ended	Torquay United	Summer	Free	1	0	BBC Sport
8	MF	Alan Navarro	(England)	31	Contract Ended	Swindon Town	Summer	Free	85	1	BBC Sport
35	MF	Jake Forster-Caskey	(England)	18	Loan	Oxford United	Summer	Six month loan	8	2	BBC Sport
32	MF	Yaser Kasim	(Iraq)	21	Loan	Luton Town	Summer	Six Month Loan	2	0	BBC Sport
31	DF	Grant Hall	(England)	20	Contract Ended	Tottenham Hotspur	Summer	Free	1	0	Tottenham Hotspur
11	MF	Craig Noone	(England)	24	Transfer	Cardiff City (Wales)	Summer	Undisclosed	64	4	Brighton & Hove Albion
	FW	Roland Bergkamp	(Netherlands)	21	Loan	VVV-Venlo (Netherlands)	Summer	Season Long Loan	0	0	BBC Sport
17	MF	Ryan Harley	(England)	27	Loan	Milton Keynes Dons	Winter	Season Long Loan	21	2	BBC Sport
N/A	MF	Matt Sparrow	(England)	31	Free	Crawley Town	Winter	Free	58	8	Crawley Town FC
10	FW	Stephen Dobbie	(Scotland)	30	Loan	Crystal Palace	Winter	Season Long Loan	13	2	BBC Sport
22	DF	Marcos Painter	(Republic of Ireland) (England)	26	Loan	Bournemouth	Winter	Season Long Loan	98	1	BBC Sport

EU = if holds or not a European Union passport; Country: when 2 flags, 1st flag = country that plays for internationally, 2nd flag = country of birth; N = number on jersey; P = Position (for position name, pause mouse pointer on abbreviation); Name = Name on jersey (for more extensive name, pause mouse pointer on name); Age = age on the day of the signing; Moving from = only indicate the club the player was playing before start playing for this club in this season, for the type of the moving see Status column; Moving to = only indicates the club the player is going to play next, for the type of the moving see Status column; Ends = when the player's current contract ends; n/a = Not applicable; Apps = Total number of competitive appearances (including substitute appearances) at the club prior to departure; Goals = Total number of competitive goals scored at the club prior to departure.

=== Contracts ===
No.	Pos.	Nat.	Name	Age	Status	Contract length	Expiry date	Source
35	MF	(England)	Jake Forster-Caskey	18	Signed	4 years	June 2015	BBC Sport
15	MF	(Spain)	Vicente	30	Signed	1 year	June 2013	Sky Sports
30	MF	(England)	Will Buckley	23	Signed	4 1/2 years	June 2017	BBC Sport

== Competitions ==
=== League table ===
Pos	Team	Pld	W	D	L	GF	GA	GD	Pts	Promotion or relegation
2	Hull City (P)	46	24	7	15	61	52	+9	79	Promotion to the Premier League
3	Watford	46	23	8	15	85	58	+27	77	Qualification for Championship play-offs
4	Brighton & Hove Albion	46	19	18	9	69	43	+26	75	Qualification for Championship play-offs
5	Crystal Palace (O, P)	46	19	15	12	73	62	+11	72	Qualification for Championship play-offs
6	Leicester City	46	19	11	16	71	48	+23	68	Qualification for Championship play-offs

Updated to match(es) played on 4 May 2013. Source: BBC Sport
Rules for classification: 1) points; 2) goal difference; 3) number of goals scored.
(O) Play-off winners; (P) Promoted

=== Results summary ===
Overall								Home						Away					
Pld	W	D	L	GF	GA	GD	Pts	W	D	L	GF	GA	GD	W	D	L	GF	GA	GD
46	19	18	9	69	43	+26	75	11	9	3	39	17	+22	8	9	6	30	26	+4

Last updated: 28 April 2013.

=== Results round by round ===
Round	1	2	3	4	5	6	7	8	9	10	11	12	13	14	15	16	17	18	19	20	21	22	23	24	25	26	27	28	29	30	31	32	33	34	35	36	37	38	39	40	41	42	43	44	45	46
Ground	A	H	H	A	H	A	A	H	H	A	H	A	A	H	H	A	A	H	H	A	A	H	H	A	H	A	A	A	A	H	A	H	H	H	A	A	A	H	A	H	H	A	A	H	A	H
Result	L	D	W	W	W	W	W	L	D	D	L	L	D	D	W	D	W	D	W	L	D	D	D	P	L	W	D	D	L	W	W	W	W	W	D	L	L	W	D	D	D	W	D	W	W	W
Position	17	21	10	4	3	3	1	1	3	5	8	9	10	10	8	8	7	8	7	8	8	8	8	8	8	8	8	7	8	7	7	6	6	6	6	7	7	7	6	6	6	5	4	4	4	4

Updated to match(es) played on 28 April 2013. Source:
A = Away; H = Home; W = Win; D = Draw; L = Loss; P = Postponed

=== Matches ===
Win Draw Loss

=== League Cup ===
14 August 2012 Round 1	Swindon Town	3–0	Brighton & Hove Albion	Swindon
19:45 BST (UTC+1)	Benson 53'; Navarro 65', 75'	report		Stadium: County Ground; Attendance: 5,737

=== FA Cup ===
5 January 2013 Round 3	Brighton & Hove Albion	2–0	Newcastle United	Brighton
15:00 GMT	Orlandi 33'; Hoskins 87'	Report	(yellow card) 48' (yellow-red card) 68' Ameobi	Stadium: Falmer Stadium; Attendance: 21,704; Referee: Lee Probert

26 January 2013 Round 4	Brighton & Hove Albion	2–3	Arsenal	Brighton
15:00 GMT	Barnes 33'; Ulloa 62'	Report	16', 56' Giroud; 85' Walcott	Stadium: Falmer Stadium; Attendance: 27,113; Referee: Oliver

=== Championship ===
18 August 2012 1	Hull City	1–0	Brighton & Hove Albion	Kingston upon Hull
15:00	Simpson 85'			Stadium: KC Stadium; Attendance: 15,794

21 August 2012 2	Brighton & Hove Albion	0–0	Cardiff City	Brighton
19:45				Stadium: Falmer Stadium; Attendance: 25,518

25 August 2012 3	Brighton & Hove Albion	5–1	Barnsley	Brighton
15:00	Barnes 4', 81'; Bridge 14'; Mackail-Smith 38', 50'		35' (pen.) Davies	Stadium: Falmer Stadium; Attendance: 24,594

1 September 2012 4	Burnley	1–3	Brighton & Hove Albion	Burnley
15:00	Greer 61' (o.g.)		18', 77' Mackail-Smith; 88' Greer	Stadium: Turf Moor; Attendance: 11,413

14 September 2012 5	Brighton & Hove Albion	3–0	Sheffield Wednesday	Brighton
19:45	Bridge 24'; Mackail-Smith 54'; Buckley 58'			Stadium: Falmer Stadium; Attendance: 26,594

18 September 2012 6	Watford	0–1	Brighton & Hove Albion	Watford
19:45			50' (pen.) Mackail-Smith	Stadium: Vicarage Road; Attendance: 11,894

22 September 2012 7	Millwall	1–2	Brighton & Hove Albion	London
15:00	C Taylor (red card) 68'; Wood 79'		17' Barnes; 50' El-Abd	Stadium: The Den; Attendance: 12,191

29 September 2012 8	Brighton & Hove Albion	0–1	Birmingham City	Brighton
15:00			27' Burke	Stadium: Falmer Stadium; Attendance: 26,121

2 October 2012 9	Brighton & Hove Albion	1–1	Ipswich Town	Brighton
19:45	Buckley 80'		27' Murphy	Stadium: Falmer Stadium; Attendance: 24,736

6 October 2012 10	Derby County	0–0	Brighton & Hove Albion	Derby
19:45				Stadium: Pride Park Stadium; Attendance: 22,059

20 October 2012 11	Brighton & Hove Albion	0–1	Middlesbrough	Brighton
15:00			21' Emnes	Stadium: Falmer Stadium; Attendance: 26,293

23 October 2012 12	Leicester City	1–0	Brighton & Hove Albion	Leicester
19:45	King			Stadium: King Power Stadium; Attendance: 25,726

27 October 2012 13	Blackpool	1–1	Brighton & Hove Albion	Blackpool
19:45	Grandin 72'		56' Barnes	Stadium: Bloomfield Road; Attendance: 14,038

2 November 2012 14	Brighton & Hove Albion	2–2	Leeds United	Brighton
19:45	Mackail-Smith 16' (pen.), 48'		37' (pen.) Diouf; 66' Becchio	Stadium: Falmer Stadium; Attendance: 26,402

6 November 2012 15	Brighton & Hove Albion	1–0	Peterborough United	Brighton
19:45	Dobbie 90'			Stadium: Falmer Stadium; Attendance: 23,703

10 November 2012 16	Wolverhampton Wanderers	3–3	Brighton & Hove Albion	Wolverhampton
15:00	Sako 22'; Henry (red card) 45'; Doumbia 61'; Johnson 90'		43' Mackail-Smith; 72' Buckley; 89' (pen.) Stephen Dobbie	Stadium: Molineux Stadium; Attendance: 21,203

17 November 2012 17	Huddersfield Town	1–2	Brighton & Hove Albion	Huddersfield
15:00	Church 90'		5', 40' Buckley	Stadium: Glapharam Stadium; Attendance: 13,299

24 November 2012 18	Brighton & Hove Albion	1–1	Bolton Wanderers	Brighton
15:00	Bruno 54'		90' Ngog	Stadium: Falmer Stadium; Attendance: 26,445

27 November 2012 19	Brighton & Hove Albion	2–0	Bristol City	Brighton
19:45	Hammond 6'; Orlandi 26'			Stadium: Falmer Stadium; Attendance: 24,044

1 December 2012 20	Crystal Palace	3–0	Brighton & Hove Albion	London
15:00	Murray 38' (pen.), 54' (pen.); Garvan 71' (pen.)		(red card) 8' Dunk	Stadium: Selhurst Park; Attendance: 20,114

8 December 2012 21	Charlton Athletic	2–2	Brighton & Hove Albion	London
15:00	Wilson 9'; Pritchard 70'		28' Mackail-Smith; 75' LuaLua	Stadium: The Valley; Attendance: 19,018

15 December 2012 22	Brighton & Hove Albion	0–0	Nottingham Forest	Brighton
15:00				Stadium: Falmer Stadium; Attendance: 26,684

18 December 2012 23	Brighton & Hove Albion	2–2	Millwall	Brighton
19:45	LuaLua 61'; López 88' (pen.)		25', 57' Wood	Stadium: Falmer Stadium; Attendance: 24,773

22 December 2012	Blackburn Rovers	P–P	Brighton & Hove Albion	Blackburn
15:00				Stadium: Ewood Park

29 December 2012 25	Brighton & Hove Albion	1–3	Watford	Brighton
15:00	López 65' (pen.)		54' Deeney; 68', 69' Vydra	Stadium: Falmer Stadium; Attendance: 26,727

1 January 2013 26	Ipswich Town	0–3	Brighton & Hove Albion	Ipswich
15:00			15' Hammond; 34' Mackail-Smith; 67' Bridge	Stadium: Portman Road; Attendance: 19,018

12 January 2013 27	Brighton & Hove Albion	2–1	Derby County	Falmer Stadium
15:00	Barnes 2'; Orlandi 25'		70' Hendrick	Attendance: 25,464

19 January 2013 28	Birmingham City	2–2	Brighton & Hove Albion	Birmingham
15:00	Caldwell 18'; Žigić 90'		24' Barnes; 43' López	Stadium: St Andrew's; Attendance: 15,299

22 January 2013 24	Blackburn Rovers	1–1	Brighton & Hove Albion	Blackburn
15:00	Rhodes 45' (pen.)		90' (pen.) López	Stadium: Ewood Park; Attendance: 12,230

2 February 2013 29	Sheffield Wednesday	3–1	Brighton & Hove Albion	Sheffield
15:00	Lita 5'; Pugh 34'; Antonio 56'		(red card) 33' Barnes; 54' Orlandi	Stadium: Hillsborough Stadium; Attendance: 22,044

9 February 2013 30	Brighton & Hove Albion	1–0	Hull City	Brighton
15:00	Vicente 83'			Stadium: Falmer Stadium; Attendance: 25,367

12 February 2013 31	Brighton & Hove Albion	1–1	Blackburn Rovers	Brighton
19:45	Vicente 57' (pen.)		24' Dann	Stadium: Falmer Stadium; Attendance: 24,759

19 February 2013 32	Cardiff City	0–2	Brighton & Hove Albion	Cardiff
19:45			43' Andrea Orlandi; 90' Ulloa	Stadium: Cardiff City Stadium; Attendance: 23,782

23 February 2013 33	Brighton & Hove Albion	1–0	Burnley	Brighton
15:00	López 20'			Stadium: Falmer Stadium; Attendance: 25,836

2 March 2013 34	Brighton & Hove Albion	4–1	Huddersfield Town	Brighton
15:00	Ulloa 20', 76', 78'; López 81' (pen.)		42' Vaughan	Stadium: Falmer Stadium; Attendance: 25,831

5 March 2013 35	Bristol City	0–0	Brighton & Hove Albion	Bristol
19:45				Stadium: Ashton Gate Stadium; Attendance: 12,267

9 March 2013 36	Bolton Wanderers	1–0	Brighton & Hove Albion	Bolton
15:00	Alonso 20'		(red card) 90+4' Barnes	Stadium: Reebok Stadium; Attendance: 17,599

12 March 2013 37	Barnsley	2–1	Brighton & Hove Albion	Barnsley
19:45	Scotland 15'; Dagnall 64' (pen.)		59' Ulloa	Stadium: Oakwell; Attendance: 7,869

17 March 2013 38	Brighton & Hove Albion	3–0	Crystal Palace	Brighton
15:00	Ulloa 43', 50'; López 45'			Stadium: Falmer Stadium; Attendance: 28,499

30 March 2013 39	Nottingham Forest	2–2	Brighton & Hove Albion	Nottingham
15:00	McGugan 82'; Lansbury 90'		57' Ulloa; 85' Buckley	Stadium: City Ground; Attendance: 28,124

2 April 2013 40	Brighton & Hove Albion	0–0	Charlton Athletic	Brighton
19:45				Stadium: Falmer Stadium; Attendance: 28,043

6 April 2013 41	Brighton & Hove Albion	1–1	Leicester City	Brighton
15:00	LuaLua 88'		73' James	Stadium: Falmer Stadium; Attendance: 28,493

13 April 2013 42	Middlesbrough	0–2	Brighton & Hove Albion	Middlesbrough
15:00			60' Orlandi; 76' López	Stadium: Riverside Stadium; Attendance: 14,925

16 April 2013 43	Peterborough United	0–0	Brighton & Hove Albion	Peterborough
19:45				Stadium: London Road Stadium; Attendance: 8,780

20 April 2013 44	Brighton & Hove Albion	6–1	Blackpool	Brighton
15:00	Buckley 9'; Upson 23'; Orlandi 45'; López 46'; Barnes 76', 90'		53' (o.g.) Hammond	Stadium: Falmer Stadium; Attendance: 28,499

27 April 2013 45	Leeds United	1–2	Brighton & Hove Albion	Leeds
15:00	Austin (red card) 13'; Diouf 74' (pen.) (red card) 76'		10' Buckley; (red card) 73' Calderón; 88' Ulloa	Stadium: Elland Road; Attendance: 24,904

4 May 2013 46	Brighton & Hove Albion	2–0	Wolverhampton Wanderers	Brighton
12:45	LuaLua 5', 39'			Stadium: Falmer Stadium; Attendance: 30,003

== Squad statistics ==
=== Appearances ===
As of 4 May 2013

No.	Pos	Nat	Player	Total		Championship		FA Cup		League Cup	
No.	Pos	Nat	Player	Apps	Goals	Apps	Goals	Apps	Goals	Apps	Goals
1	GK	(Slovakia) SVK	Peter Brezovan	1	0	1	0	0	0	0	0
2	DF	(Spain) ESP	Bruno	31	1	29+1	1	0	0	1	0
3	DF	(Scotland) SCO	Gordon Greer	40	1	36+1	1	2	0	1	0
4	MF	(England) ENG	Dean Hammond (on loan from Southampton)	38	2	31+5	2	2	0	0	0
5	DF	(England) ENG	Lewis Dunk	9	0	7+1	0	0	0	1	0
6	DF	(Egypt) EGY	Adam El-Abd	33	1	31	1	2	0	0	0
7	FW	(England) ENG	Will Hoskins	12	1	4+7	0	0+1	1	0	0
8	MF	(Wales) WAL	Andrew Crofts	23	1	16+7	0+1	0	0	0	0
9	FW	(England) ENG	Ashley Barnes	36	9	25+8	8	2	1	1	0
11	MF	(Spain) ESP	Andrea Orlandi	35	7	29+5	6	1	1	0	0
12	FW	(Scotland) SCO	Craig Mackail-Smith	33	11	26+5	11	1+1	0	0	0
14	DF	(Spain) ESP	Iñigo Calderón	28	0	16+10	0	1	0	0+1	0
15	MF	(Spain) ESP	Vicente	12	2	5+6	2	0	0	1	0
16	GK	(Denmark) DEN	Casper Ankergren	5	0	2+1	0	2	0	0	0
17	MF	(England) ENG	Ryan Harley	3	0	0+2	0	0	0	1	0
18	MF	(Republic of Ireland) IRL	Gary Dicker	26	0	12+11	0	1+1	0	1	0
19	FW	(Argentina) ARG	Leonardo Ulloa	17	10	15+1	9	1	1	0	0
20	DF	(England) ENG	Matthew Upson (on loan from Stoke City)	17	1	17	1	0	0	0	0
21	MF	(Spain) ESP	David López	30	9	24+4	9	2	0	0	0
22	DF	(Republic of Ireland) IRL	Marcos Painter	4	0	4	0	0	0	0	0
23	FW	(Norway) NOR	Torbjørn Agdestein	3	0	0+2	0	0	0	0+1	0
25	MF	(Democratic Republic of the Congo) COD	Kazenga LuaLua	22	5	7+13	5	0+2	0	0	0
26	MF	(England) ENG	Liam Bridcutt	43	0	40	0	2	0	1	0
28	DF	(England) ENG	Wayne Bridge (on loan from Manchester City)	41	3	38	3	2	0	1	0
29	GK	(Poland) POL	Tomasz Kuszczak	42	0	41	0	0	0	1	0
30	MF	(England) ENG	Will Buckley	37	8	28+8	8	1	0	0	0
33	MF	(England) ENG	George Barker	2	0	0+2	0	0	0	0	0
35	MF	(England) ENG	Jake Forster-Caskey	3	0	0+3	0	0	0	0	0
	MF	(Iceland) ISL	Emil Asmundssen	0	0	0	0	0	0	0	0
	DF	(Latvia) LAT	Vitalijs Maksimenko	0	0	0	0	0	0	0	0
Players currently out on loan:
10	FW	(Scotland) SCO	Stephen Dobbie (on loan at Crystal Palace)	13	2	4+9	2	0	0	0	0
32	MF	(Iraq) IRQ	Yaser Kasim (on loan to Luton Town)	0	0	0	0	0	0	0	0
	FW	(Netherlands) NED	Roland Bergkamp (on loan at VVV-Venlo)	0	0	0	0	0	0	0	0
Players who left during the season:
11	MF	(England) ENG	Craig Noone	4	0	3	0	0	0	1	0
20	DF	(France) FRA	Romain Vincelot	0	0	0	0	0	0	0	0

==== Goalscorers ====
Rank	No.	Pos.	Name	Championship	FA Cup	League Cup	Total
1	12	FW	Craig Mackail-Smith	11	0	0	11
2	19	FW	Leonardo Ulloa	9	1	0	10
3	21	FW	David López	9	0	0	9
4	9	FW	Ashley Barnes	8	1	0	9
5	30	MF	Will Buckley	8	0	0	8
6	11	MF	Andrea Orlandi	6	1	0	7
7	28	DF	Wayne Bridge	3	0	0	3
7	25	MF	Kazenga LuaLua	5	0	0	5
9	10	FW	Stephen Dobbie	2	0	0	2
9	4	MF	Dean Hammond	2	0	0	2
9	15	MF	Vicente	2	0	0	2
12	2	DF	Bruno	1	0	0	1
12	6	DF	Adam El-Abd	1	0	0	1
12	3	DF	Gordon Greer	1	0	0	1
12	7	FW	Will Hoskins	0	1	0	1
12	20	DF	Matthew Upson	1	0	0	1
Total				67	4	0	71

==== Disciplinary record ====
No.	Pos.	Name	Championship		FA Cup		League Cup		Total	
No.	Pos.	Name	Yellow card	Red card	Yellow card	Red card	Yellow card	Red card	Yellow card	Red card
2	DF	Bruno	3	0	0	0	0	0	3	0
3	DF	Gordon Greer	5	0	0	0	0	0	5	0
4	MF	Dean Hammond	5	0	1	0	0	0	6	0
5	DF	Lewis Dunk	0	1	0	0	0	0	0	1
6	DF	Adam El-Abd	10	0	0	0	0	0	10	0
8	MF	Andrew Crofts	1	0	0	0	0	0	1	0
9	FW	Ashley Barnes	4	2	0	0	1	0	5	2
10	FW	Stephen Dobbie	1	0	0	0	0	0	1	0
~~11~~	MF	Craig Noone	1	0	0	0	0	0	1	0
11	MF	Andrea Orlandi	2	0	0	0	0	0	2	'0
14	DF	Iñigo Calderón	4	1	0	0	0	0	4	1
15	MF	Vicente	1	0	0	0	0	0	1	0
16	GK	Casper Ankergren	1	0	0	0	0	0	1	0
18	MF	Gary Dicker	1	0	0	0	0	0	1	0
19	FW	Leonardo Ulloa	2	0	0	0	0	0	2	0
20	DF	Matthew Upson	2	0	0	0	0	0	2	0
21	MF	David López	1	0	1	0	0	0	2	0
22	DF	Marcos Painter	1	0	0	0	0	0	1	0
25	MF	Kazenga LuaLua	2	0	0	0	0	0	2	0
26	MF	Liam Bridcutt	11	0	0	0	0	0	11	0
28	DF	Wayne Bridge	4	0	0	0	0	0	4	0
29	GK	Tomasz Kuszczak	2	0	0	0	0	0	2	0
30	MF	Will Buckley	3	0	0	0	0	0	3	0
Total			67	4	2	0	1	0	70	4
