= 2001–02 Essex Senior Football League =

The 2001–02 season was the 31st in the history of Essex Senior Football League a football competition in England.

The league featured 15 clubs which competed in the league last season, along with one new club:

- Enfield Town, new club

Leyton were champions, winning their first Essex Senior League title and were promoted to the Isthmian League.

== League table ==
Essex Senior Football League
- Season: 2001–02
- Champions: Leyton
- Promoted: Leyton
- Matches: 240
- Goals: 873 (3.64 per match)

Pos	Team	Pld	W	D	L	GF	GA	GD	Pts	Promotion or relegation
1	Leyton	30	24	3	3	75	23	+52	75	Promoted to the Isthmian League
2	Enfield Town	30	22	3	5	83	28	+55	69	
3	Burnham Ramblers	30	17	2	11	57	42	+15	53	
4	Concord Rangers	30	16	2	12	65	51	+14	50	
5	Southend Manor	30	14	7	9	58	42	+16	49	
6	Bowers United	30	13	9	8	70	51	+19	46 (Note: Bowers United were deducted two points.)	
7	Sawbridgeworth Town	30	13	7	10	59	54	+5	46	
8	Stansted	30	12	6	12	55	54	+1	42	
9	Ilford	30	11	5	14	51	49	+2	38	
10	Basildon United	30	10	7	13	58	64	−6	37	
11	Saffron Walden Town	30	10	6	14	40	62	−22	36	
12	Hullbridge Sports	30	9	6	15	44	76	−32	33	
13	Barkingside	30	8	8	14	44	50	−6	32	
14	Brentwood	30	8	6	16	45	53	−8	30	
15	Eton Manor	30	4	7	19	40	73	−33	19	
16	Woodford Town	30	5	4	21	29	101	−72	19	

Source: fchd
Rules for classification: 1) points; 2) goal difference; 3) number of goals scored.
