= 2002–03 Essex Senior Football League =

The 2002–03 season was the 32nd in the history of Essex Senior Football League a football competition in England.

The league featured 15 clubs which competed in the league last season, along with two new clubs:

- Romford, resigned from the Isthmian League
- Waltham Abbey, joined from the Essex & Herts Border Combination

Enfield Town were champions, winning their first Essex Senior League title.

== League table ==
Essex Senior Football League
- Season: 2002–03
- Champions: Enfield Town
- Matches: 272
- Goals: 937 (3.44 per match)

Pos	Team	Pld	W	D	L	GF	GA	GD	Pts	Promotion or relegation
1	Enfield Town	32	23	6	3	77	28	+49	75	
2	Concord Rangers	32	23	2	7	83	46	+37	71	
3	Ilford	32	21	4	7	87	40	+47	67	
4	Southend Manor	32	20	7	5	73	43	+30	67	
5	Romford	32	21	4	7	63	34	+29	67	
6	Sawbridgeworth Town	32	18	7	7	57	30	+27	61	
7	Bowers United	32	16	6	10	58	49	+9	54	
8	Burnham Ramblers	32	14	4	14	45	43	+2	46	
9	Barkingside	32	14	3	15	66	55	+11	45	
10	Waltham Abbey	32	12	6	14	45	41	+4	42	
11	Brentwood	32	12	5	15	44	62	−18	41	
12	Saffron Walden Town	32	10	4	18	49	57	−8	34	Resigned from the league
13	Basildon United	32	9	4	19	54	71	−17	31	
14	Stansted	32	8	4	20	36	64	−28	28	
15	Hullbridge Sports	32	5	3	24	35	89	−54	18	
16	Eton Manor	32	3	8	21	43	98	−55	17	
17	Woodford Town	32	3	3	26	22	87	−65	12	Club folded

Source: fchd
Rules for classification: 1) points; 2) goal difference; 3) number of goals scored.
