= 2001–02 Isthmian League =

The 2001–02 season was the 87th season of the Isthmian League, which is an English football competition featuring semi-professional and amateur clubs from London, East and South East England.

The league consisted of four divisions for the last season. At the end of it single Division One was divided into Division One North and Division One South, most of the clubs in Division Two were promoted to the newly created divisions. Division Three was disbanded after all the clubs were promoted to divisions One North, One South and to Division Two.

== Premier Division ==
Isthmian League Premier Division
- Season: 2001–02
- Champions: Gravesend & Northfleet
- Promoted: Gravesend & Northfleet
- Relegated: Croydon
- Matches: 462
- Goals: 1,388 (3 per match)
- Highest attendance: 4,058 – Gravesend & Northfleet – Canvey Island, (26 March)
- Total attendance: 211,727
- Average attendance: 458 (+3.4% to previous season)

The Premier Division consisted of 22 clubs, including 18 clubs from the previous season and four new clubs:

- Bedford Town, promoted as runners-up in Division One
- Boreham Wood, promoted as champions of Division One
- Braintree Town, promoted as third in Division One
- Kingstonian, relegated from the Football Conference

Gravesend & Northfleet won the division and were promoted to the Football Conference. Canvey Island finished second for a second season in a row. At the end of the season the Premier Division was expanded up to 24 clubs, so only one club were to relegate this season.

=== League table ===
Pos	Team	Pld	W	D	L	GF	GA	GD	Pts	Promotion or relegation
1	Gravesend & Northfleet	42	31	6	5	90	33	+57	99	Promoted to the Football Conference
2	Canvey Island	42	30	5	7	108	41	+67	95	
3	Aldershot Town	42	22	7	13	76	51	+25	73	
4	Braintree Town	42	23	4	15	66	61	+5	73	
5	Purfleet	42	19	15	8	67	44	+23	72	
6	Grays Athletic	42	20	10	12	65	55	+10	70	
7	Chesham United	42	19	10	13	69	53	+16	67	
8	Hendon	42	19	5	18	66	55	+11	62	
9	Billericay Town	42	16	13	13	59	60	−1	61	
10	St Albans City	42	16	9	17	71	60	+11	57	
11	Hitchin Town	42	15	10	17	73	81	−8	55	
12	Sutton United	42	13	15	14	62	63	−1	54	
13	Heybridge Swifts	42	15	9	18	68	85	−17	54	
14	Kingstonian	42	13	13	16	50	56	−6	52	
15	Boreham Wood	42	15	6	21	50	62	−12	51	
16	Maidenhead United	42	15	5	22	51	63	−12	50	
17	Bedford Town	42	12	12	18	64	69	−5	48	
18	Basingstoke Town	42	11	15	16	50	68	−18	48	
19	Enfield	42	11	9	22	48	77	−29	42	
20	Hampton & Richmond	42	9	13	20	51	71	−20	40	
21	Harrow Borough	42	8	10	24	50	89	−39	34	
22	Croydon	42	7	5	30	36	93	−57	26	Relegated to Division One South

Source: fchd.com rsssf.com
Rules for classification: 1) points; 2) goal difference; 3) number of goals scored.

=== Stadia and locations ===
Locations of the Premier Division clubs
Greater London Premier Division football clubs

Club	Stadium
Aldershot Town	Recreation Ground
Basingstoke Town	The Camrose
Bedford Town	The Eyrie
Billericay Town	New Lodge
Boreham Wood	Meadow Park
Braintree Town	Cressing Road
Canvey Island	Brockwell Stadium
Croydon	Croydon Sports Arena
Chesham United	The Meadow
Enfield	Meadow Park (groundshare with Boreham Wood)
Gravesend & Northfleet	Stonebridge Road
Grays Athletic	New Recreation Ground
Hampton & Richmond Borough	Beveree Stadium
Harrow Borough	Earlsmead Stadium
Hendon	Claremont Road
Heybridge Swifts	Scraley Road
Hitchin Town	Top Field
Kingstonian	Kingsmeadow (groundshare with AFC Wimbledon)
Maidenhead United	York Road
St Albans City	Clarence Park
Sutton United	Gander Green Lane
Thurrock	Ship Lane

== Division One ==
Isthmian League Division One
- Season: 2001–02
- Champions: Ford United
- Promoted: Aylesbury United; Bishop's Stortford; Ford United
- Relegated: None
- Matches: 462
- Goals: 1,667 (3.61 per match)
- Highest attendance: 1,412 – Aylesbury United – Oxford City, (20 April)
- Total attendance: 103,283
- Average attendance: 224 (+0.4% to previous season)

Division One consisted of 22 clubs, including 16 clubs from the previous season and six new clubs:

Three clubs relegated from the Premier Division:

- Carshalton Athletic
- Dulwich Hamlet
- Slough Town

Three clubs promoted from Division Two:

- Barking
- Tooting & Mitcham United
- Windsor & Eton

At the end of the previous season Barking ceased to exist when they merged with East Ham United to form Barking & East Ham United, taken place of Barking in Division One.

Ford United won the division and were promoted to the Premier Division along with Bishop's Stortford and Aylesbury United. At the end of the season Division One was replaced by divisions One North and South, remaining clubs were distributed between newly created divisions. There was no relegation from Division One this season.

=== League table ===
Pos	Team	Pld	W	D	L	GF	GA	GD	Pts	Promotion or relegation
1	Ford United	42	27	7	8	92	56	+36	88	Promoted to the Premier Division
2	Bishop's Stortford	42	26	9	7	104	51	+53	87	Promoted to the Premier Division
3	Aylesbury United	42	23	10	9	96	64	+32	79	Promoted to the Premier Division
4	Bognor Regis Town	42	20	13	9	74	55	+19	73	Placed to Division One South
5	Northwood	42	19	11	12	92	64	+28	68	Placed to Division One North
6	Carshalton Athletic	42	17	16	9	64	53	+11	67	Placed to Division One South
7	Harlow Town	42	19	9	14	77	65	+12	66	Placed to Division One North
8	Slough Town	42	17	11	14	68	51	+17	62	Placed to Division One North
9	Uxbridge	42	18	6	18	68	65	+3	60	Placed to Division One North
10	Oxford City	42	17	9	16	59	66	−7	60	Placed to Division One North
11	Thame United	42	15	14	13	75	61	+14	59	Placed to Division One North
12	Tooting & Mitcham United	42	16	11	15	70	70	0	59	Placed to Division One South
13	Walton & Hersham	42	16	10	16	75	70	+5	58	Placed to Division One South
14	Yeading	42	16	10	16	84	90	−6	58	Placed to Division One North
15	Worthing	42	15	8	19	69	65	+4	53	Placed to Division One South
16	Staines Town	42	12	11	19	45	60	−15	47	Placed to Division One South
17	Dulwich Hamlet	42	11	13	18	64	76	−12	46	Placed to Division One South
18	Wealdstone	42	11	12	19	60	82	−22	45	Placed to Division One North
19	Bromley	42	10	11	21	44	74	−30	41	Placed to Division One South
20	Whyteleafe	42	10	11	21	46	86	−40	41	Placed to Division One South
21	Barking & East Ham United	42	8	7	27	61	123	−62	31	Placed to Division One North
22	Windsor & Eton	42	7	5	30	53	93	−40	26	Placed to Division One South

Source: fchd.com rsssf.com
Rules for classification: 1) points; 2) goal difference; 3) number of goals scored.

=== Stadia and locations ===
Locations of the Division One clubs
Greater London Division One football clubs

Club	Stadium
Aylesbury United	Buckingham Road
Barking & East Ham United	Mayesbrook Park
Bishop's Stortford	Woodside Park
Bognor Regis Town	Nyewood Lane
Bromley	Hayes Lane
Carshalton Athletic	War Memorial Sports Ground
Dulwich Hamlet	Champion Hill
Ford United	Oakside
Harlow Town	Harlow Sportcentre
Northwood	Chestnut Avenue
Oxford City	Marsh Lane
Slough Town	Wexham Park
Staines Town	Wheatsheaf Park
Thame United	Windmill Road
Tooting & Mitcham United	Imperial Fields
Uxbridge	Honeycroft
Walton & Hersham	The Sports Ground
Wealdstone	White Lion (groundshare with Edgware Town)
Whyteleafe	Church Road
Windsor & Eton	Stag Meadow
Worthing	Woodside Road
Yeading	The Warren

== Division Two ==
Isthmian League Division Two
- Season: 2001–02
- Champions: Lewes
- Promoted: 19 clubs
- Matches: 462
- Goals: 1,533 (3.32 per match)
- Highest attendance: 962 – Horsham – Lewes, (1 April)
- Total attendance: 49,389
- Average attendance: 107 (+1.9% to previous season)

Division Two consisted of 22 clubs, including 16 clubs from the previous season and six new clubs:

Three clubs relegated from Division One:

- Barton Rovers
- Leatherhead
- Romford

Three clubs promoted from Division Three:

- Arlesey Town
- Ashford Town
- Lewes

Lewes won the division at the first attempt. At the end of the season most of Division Two clubs were transferred to the newly created divisions One. Their places were taken by clubs from disbanded Division Three.

=== League table ===
Pos	Team	Pld	W	D	L	GF	GA	GD	Pts	Promotion or relegation
1	Lewes	42	29	9	4	108	31	+77	96	Promoted to Division One South
2	Horsham	42	27	9	6	104	44	+60	90	Promoted to Division One South
3	Berkhamsted Town	42	23	10	9	82	51	+31	79	Promoted to Division One North
4	Arlesey Town	42	23	6	13	89	55	+34	75	Promoted to Division One North
5	Banstead Athletic	42	22	8	12	83	54	+29	74	Promoted to Division One South
6	Leyton Pennant	42	22	8	12	84	60	+24	74	Promoted to Division One North
7	Great Wakering Rovers	42	21	8	13	64	37	+27	71	Promoted to Division One North
8	East Thurrock United	42	21	8	13	67	59	+8	71	Promoted to Division One North
9	Marlow	42	18	13	11	73	63	+10	67	Promoted to Division One North
10	Hemel Hempstead Town	42	18	10	14	82	66	+16	64	Promoted to Division One North
11	Leatherhead	42	17	6	19	72	62	+10	57	Promoted to Division One South
12	Ashford Town	42	15	11	16	58	71	−13	56	Promoted to Division One South
13	Metropolitan Police	42	16	7	19	84	84	0	55	Promoted to Division One South
14	Barton Rovers	42	15	9	18	54	60	−6	54	Promoted to Division One North
15	Hungerford Town	42	14	9	19	56	75	−19	51	
16	Tilbury	42	15	6	21	55	74	−19	51	Promoted to Division One North
17	Chertsey Town	42	10	14	18	79	112	−33	44	Promoted to Division One South
18	Wembley	42	9	10	23	51	82	−31	37	Promoted to Division One North
19	Molesey	42	10	6	26	40	93	−53	36	Promoted to Division One South
20	Cheshunt	42	7	13	22	51	84	−33	34	
21	Wivenhoe Town	42	8	9	25	55	111	−56	33	Promoted to Division One North
22	Romford	42	4	7	31	42	105	−63	19	Resigned and joined the Essex Senior League

Source: fchd.com rsssf.com
Rules for classification: 1) points; 2) goal difference; 3) number of goals scored.

=== Stadia and locations ===
Locations of the Division Two clubs
Greater London Division Two football clubs

Club	Stadium
Arlesey Town	Hitchin Road
Ashford Town (Middlesex)	Short Lane
Banstead Athletic	Merland Rise
Barton Rovers	Sharpenhoe Road
Berkhamsted Town	Broadwater
Chertsey Town	Alwyns Lane
Cheshunt	Cheshunt Stadium
East Thurrock United	Rookery Hill
Great Wakering Rovers	Burroughs Park
Hemel Hempstead Town	Vauxhall Road
Horsham	Queen Street
Hungerford Town	Bulpit Lane
Leatherhead	Fetcham Grove
Lewes	The Dripping Pan
Leyton Pennant	Wadham Lodge
Marlow	Alfred Davis Memorial Ground
Metropolitan Police	Imber Court
Molesey	Walton Road Stadium
Romford	Sungate
Tilbury	Chadfields
Wembley	Vale Farm
Wivenhoe Town	Broad Lane

== Division Three ==
Isthmian League Division Three
- Season: 2001–02
- Champions: Croydon Athletic
- Promoted: all clubs
- Matches: 462
- Goals: 1,631 (3.53 per match)
- Highest attendance: 248 – Ware – Hertford Town, (1 April)
- Total attendance: 31,377
- Average attendance: 68 (-9.3% to previous season)

Division Three consisted of 22 clubs, including 19 clubs from the previous season and three clubs relegated from Division Two:

- Edgware Town
- Leighton Town
- Wokingham Town

Croydon Athletic won the division and were promoted two tiers up along with eight other clubs. At the end of the season Division Three was disbanded due to creation of divisions One, clubs were distributed between newly created divisions.

=== League table ===
Pos	Team	Pld	W	D	L	GF	GA	GD	Pts	Promotion or relegation
1	Croydon Athletic	42	30	5	7	138	41	+97	95	Promoted to the Division One South
2	Hornchurch	42	25	11	6	96	46	+50	86	Promoted to the Division One North
3	Aveley	42	26	6	10	109	55	+54	84	Promoted to the Division One North
4	Bracknell Town	42	25	8	9	96	54	+42	83	Promoted to the Division One South
5	Epsom & Ewell	42	20	15	7	79	51	+28	75	Promoted to the Division One South
6	Egham Town	42	21	11	10	72	59	+13	74	Promoted to the Division One South
7	Wingate & Finchley	42	20	9	13	80	60	+20	69	Promoted to the Division One North
8	Dorking	42	18	14	10	77	66	+11	68	Promoted to Division Two
9	Tring Town	42	19	11	12	64	62	+2	68	Promoted to Division Two
10	Corinthian-Casuals	42	18	13	11	69	44	+25	67	Promoted to the Division One South
11	Hertford Town	42	20	7	15	88	74	+14	67	Promoted to the Division One North
12	Witham Town	42	15	10	17	66	72	−6	55	Promoted to Division Two
13	Ware	42	14	10	18	74	76	−2	52	Promoted to Division Two
14	Chalfont St Peter	42	15	4	23	69	92	−23	49	Promoted to Division Two
15	Wokingham Town	42	14	6	22	79	105	−26	48	Promoted to Division Two
16	Abingdon Town	42	13	7	22	61	75	−14	46	Promoted to Division Two
17	Leighton Town	42	8	12	22	56	95	−39	36	Promoted to Division Two
18	Kingsbury Town	42	8	11	23	58	91	−33	35	Promoted to Division Two
19	Edgware Town	42	9	7	26	65	101	−36	34	Promoted to Division Two
20	Flackwell Heath	42	9	8	25	53	99	−46	32 (Note: Flackwell Heath deducted three points.)	Promoted to Division Two
21	Clapton	42	9	4	29	45	118	−73	31	Promoted to Division Two
22	Camberley Town	42	7	9	26	37	95	−58	30	Promoted to Division Two

Source: fchd.com rsssf.com
Rules for classification: 1) points; 2) goal difference; 3) number of goals scored.

=== Stadia and locations ===
Locations of the Division Three clubs
Greater London Division Three football clubs

Club	Stadium
Abingdon Town	Culham Road
Aveley	The Mill Field
Bracknell Town	Larges Lane
Camberley Town	Kroomer Park
Chalfont St Peter	Mill Meadow
Clapton	The Old Spotted Dog Ground
Corinthian-Casuals	King George's Field
Croydon Athletic	Keith Tuckey Stadium
Dorking	Meadowbank Stadium
Edgware Town	White Lion
Egham Town	The Runnymede Stadium
Epsom & Ewell	Merland Rise (groundshare with Banstead Athletic)
Flackwell Heath	Wilks Park
Hertford Town	Hertingfordbury Park
Hornchurch	Hornchurch Stadium
Kingsbury Town	Avenue Park
Leighton Town	Bell Close
Tring Town	Pendley Ground
Ware	Wodson Park
Wingate & Finchley	The Harry Abrahams Stadium
Witham Town	Spa Road
Wokingham Town	Cantley Park

== See also ==
- Isthmian League
- 2001–02 Northern Premier League
- 2001–02 Southern Football League
