= 2002–03 Isthmian League =

The 2002–03 season was the 88th season of the Isthmian League, which is an English football competition featuring semi-professional and amateur clubs from London, East and South East England.

== Premier Division ==
Isthmian League Premier Division
- Season: 2002–03
- Champions: Aldershot Town
- Promoted: Aldershot Town
- Relegated: Boreham Wood; Chesham United; Enfield; Hampton & Richmond Borough
- Matches: 552
- Goals: 1,575 (2.85 per match)
- Highest attendance: 3,553 – Canvey Island – Aldershot Town, (15 April)
- Total attendance: 238,373
- Average attendance: 432 (-5.7% to previous season)

The Premier Division consisted of 24 clubs, including 20 clubs from the previous season and four new clubs:

- Aylesbury United, promoted as third in Division One
- Bishop's Stortford, promoted as runners-up in Division One
- Ford United, promoted as champions of Division One
- Hayes, relegated from the Football Conference

Aldershot Town won the division and were promoted to the Football Conference ten years after Aldershot bankruptcy. Canvey Island finished second for the third time in a row. Four teams finished bottom of the table relegated to divisions One.

At the end of the season Purfleet was renamed Thurrock.

=== League table ===
Pos	Team	Pld	W	D	L	GF	GA	GD	Pts	Promotion or relegation
1	Aldershot Town	46	33	6	7	81	36	+45	105	Promoted to the Football Conference
2	Canvey Island	46	28	8	10	112	56	+56	92	
3	Hendon	46	22	13	11	70	56	+14	79	
4	St Albans City	46	23	8	15	73	65	+8	77	
5	Basingstoke Town	46	23	7	16	80	60	+20	76	
6	Sutton United	46	22	9	15	77	62	+15	75	
7	Hayes	46	20	13	13	67	54	+13	73	
8	Purfleet	46	19	15	12	68	48	+20	72	
9	Bedford Town	46	21	9	16	66	58	+8	72	
10	Maidenhead United	46	16	17	13	75	63	+12	65	
11	Kingstonian	46	16	17	13	71	64	+7	65	
12	Billericay Town	46	17	11	18	46	44	+2	62	
13	Bishop's Stortford	46	16	11	19	74	72	+2	59	
14	Hitchin Town	46	15	13	18	69	67	+2	58	
15	Ford United	46	15	12	19	78	84	−6	57	
16	Braintree Town	46	14	12	20	59	71	−12	54	
17	Aylesbury United	46	13	15	18	62	75	−13	54	
18	Harrow Borough	46	15	9	22	54	75	−21	54	
19	Grays Athletic	46	14	11	21	53	59	−6	53	
20	Heybridge Swifts	46	13	14	19	52	80	−28	53	
21	Chesham United	46	14	10	22	56	81	−25	52	Relegated to Division One North
22	Boreham Wood	46	11	15	20	50	58	−8	48	Relegated to Division One North
23	Enfield	46	9	11	26	47	101	−54	38	Relegated to Division One North
24	Hampton & Richmond	46	3	14	29	35	86	−51	23	Relegated to Division One South

Rules for classification: 1) points; 2) goal difference; 3) number of goals scored.

=== Stadia and locations ===
Locations of the Premier Division clubs
Greater London Premier Division football clubs

Club	Stadium
Aldershot Town	Recreation Ground
Aylesbury United	Buckingham Road
Basingstoke Town	The Camrose
Bedford Town	The Eyrie
Billericay Town	New Lodge
Bishop's Stortford	Woodside Park
Boreham Wood	Meadow Park
Braintree Town	Cressing Road
Canvey Island	Brockwell Stadium
Chesham United	The Meadow
Enfield	Meadow Park (groundshare with Boreham Wood)
Ford United	Oakside
Grays Athletic	New Recreation Ground
Hampton & Richmond Borough	Beveree Stadium
Harrow Borough	Earlsmead Stadium
Hayes	Church Road
Hendon	Claremont Road
Heybridge Swifts	Scraley Road
Hitchin Town	Top Field
Kingstonian	Kingsmeadow (groundshare with AFC Wimbledon)
Maidenhead United	York Road
St Albans City	Clarence Park
Sutton United	Gander Green Lane
Thurrock	Ship Lane

== Division One North ==
Isthmian League Division One North
- Season: 2002–03
- Champions: Northwood
- Promoted: Hornchurch; Northwood
- Relegated: Hertford Town; Wembley
- Matches: 552
- Goals: 1,667 (3.02 per match)
- Highest attendance: 583 – Hornchurch – Berkhamsted Town, (26 April)
- Total attendance: 79,162
- Average attendance: 143

At the end of the previous season Division One was replaced by divisions One North and South. Subsequently, Division Three clubs were distributed between divisions One and Two.

Division One North consisted of 24 clubs, including nine clubs from the Division One, eleven clubs promoted from the Division Two and four clubs promoted from the Division Three.

Northwood won the division and were promoted to the Premier Division along with runners-up Hornchurch, who promoted from Division Three to the Premier Division in two seasons. Wembley and Hertford Town finished bottom of the table and relegated to Division Two.

At the end of the season Leyton Pennant were renamed Waltham Forest.

=== League table ===
Pos	Team	Pld	W	D	L	GF	GA	GD	Pts	Promotion or relegation
1	Northwood	46	28	7	11	109	56	+53	91	Promoted to the Premier Division
2	Hornchurch	46	25	15	6	85	48	+37	90	Promoted to the Premier Division
3	Hemel Hempstead Town	46	26	7	13	70	55	+15	85	
4	Slough Town	46	22	14	10	86	59	+27	80	Transferred to Division One South
5	Uxbridge	46	23	10	13	62	41	+21	79	
6	Aveley	46	21	14	11	66	48	+18	77	
7	Berkhamsted Town	46	21	13	12	92	68	+24	76	
8	Thame United	46	20	12	14	84	51	+33	72	
9	Wealdstone	46	21	9	16	85	69	+16	72	
10	Harlow Town	46	20	12	14	66	53	+13	72	
11	Marlow	46	19	10	17	74	63	+11	67	Transferred to Division One South
12	Barking & East Ham United	46	19	9	18	73	76	−3	66	
13	Yeading	46	18	11	17	77	69	+8	65	
14	Great Wakering Rovers	46	17	14	15	64	70	−6	65	
15	Oxford City	46	17	13	16	55	51	+4	64	
16	Arlesey Town	46	17	12	17	69	71	−2	63	
17	East Thurrock United	46	17	10	19	75	79	−4	61	
18	Wingate & Finchley	46	15	11	20	70	74	−4	56	
19	Barton Rovers	46	15	7	24	53	65	−12	52	
20	Tilbury	46	14	7	25	55	96	−41	49	
21	Wivenhoe Town	46	9	11	26	56	94	−38	38	
22	Leyton Pennant	46	9	7	30	38	81	−43	34	
23	Wembley	46	7	11	28	57	111	−54	32	Relegated to Division Two
24	Hertford Town	46	6	6	34	46	119	−73	24	Relegated to Division Two

Rules for classification: 1) points; 2) goal difference; 3) number of goals scored.

=== Stadia and locations ===
Locations of the Division One North clubs
Greater London Division One North football clubs

Club	Stadium
Arlesey Town	Hitchin Road
Aveley	The Mill Field
Barking & East Ham United	Mayesbrook Park
Barton Rovers	Sharpenhoe Road
Berkhamsted Town	Broadwater
East Thurrock United	Rookery Hill
Great Wakering Rovers	Burroughs Park
Harlow Town	Harlow Sportcentre
Hemel Hempstead Town	Vauxhall Road
Hertford Town	Hertingfordbury Park
Hornchurch	Hornchurch Stadium
Leyton Pennant	Wadham Lodge
Marlow	Alfred Davis Memorial Ground
Northwood	Chestnut Avenue
Oxford City	Marsh Lane
Slough Town	Wexham Park
Thame United	Windmill Road
Tilbury	Chadfields
Uxbridge	Honeycroft
Wealdstone	White Lion (groundshare with Edgware Town)
Wembley	Vale Farm
Wingate & Finchley	The Harry Abrahams Stadium
Wivenhoe Town	Broad Lane
Yeading	The Warren

== Division One South ==
Isthmian League Division One South
- Season: 2002–03
- Champions: Carshalton Athletic
- Promoted: Bognor Regis Town; Carshalton Athletic
- Relegated: Chertsey Town
- Matches: 552
- Goals: 1,604 (2.91 per match)
- Highest attendance: 1,147 – Staines Town – Carshalton Athletic, (22 February)
- Total attendance: 102,455
- Average attendance: 186

At the end of the previous season Division One was replaced by divisions One North and South. Subsequently, Division Three clubs were distributed between divisions One and Two.

Division One South consisted of 24 clubs, including ten clubs from the Division One, eight clubs promoted from the Division Two, five clubs promoted from the Division Three, and one club relegated from Premier Division.

Carshalton Athletic won the division and were promoted to the Premier Division along with runners-up Bognor Regis Town, who promoted from Division Three to the Premier Division in two seasons. Chertsey Town finished bottom of the table and relegated to Division Two.

=== League table ===
Pos	Team	Pld	W	D	L	GF	GA	GD	Pts	Promotion or relegation
1	Carshalton Athletic	46	28	8	10	73	44	+29	92	Promoted to the Premier Division
2	Bognor Regis Town	46	26	10	10	92	34	+58	88	Promoted to the Premier Division
3	Lewes	46	24	16	6	106	50	+56	88	
4	Dulwich Hamlet	46	23	12	11	73	49	+24	81	
5	Whyteleafe	46	21	13	12	74	51	+23	76	
6	Bromley	46	21	13	12	70	53	+17	76	
7	Walton & Hersham	46	20	13	13	87	63	+24	73	
8	Horsham	46	21	9	16	80	58	+22	72	
9	Epsom & Ewell	46	19	12	15	67	66	+1	69	
10	Egham Town	46	19	10	17	62	71	−9	67	
11	Tooting & Mitcham United	46	18	9	19	83	78	+5	63	
12	Worthing	46	17	12	17	78	75	+3	63	
13	Windsor & Eton	46	18	9	19	66	65	+1	63	
14	Leatherhead	46	16	13	17	71	66	+5	61	
15	Staines Town	46	14	16	16	57	63	−6	58	
16	Banstead Athletic	46	14	15	17	58	59	−1	57	
17	Ashford Town (Middlesex)	46	14	11	21	47	70	−23	53	
18	Croydon	46	15	8	23	56	87	−31	53	
19	Croydon Athletic	46	13	13	20	52	66	−14	52	
20	Bracknell Town	46	12	16	18	57	74	−17	52	
21	Corinthian-Casuals	46	12	14	20	50	68	−18	50	
22	Molesey	46	13	9	24	52	79	−27	48	
23	Metropolitan Police	46	12	10	24	50	76	−26	46	
24	Chertsey Town	46	3	7	36	43	139	−96	16	Relegated to Division Two

Rules for classification: 1) points; 2) goal difference; 3) number of goals scored.

=== Stadia and locations ===
Locations of Division One South clubs
Greater London Division One South clubs

Club	Stadium
Ashford Town (Middlesex)	Short Lane
Banstead Athletic	Merland Rise
Bognor Regis Town	Nyewood Lane
Bracknell Town	Larges Lane
Bromley	Hayes Lane
Carshalton Athletic	War Memorial Sports Ground
Chertsey Town	Alwyns Lane
Corinthian-Casuals	King George's Field
Croydon	Croydon Sports Arena
Croydon Athletic	Keith Tuckey Stadium
Dulwich Hamlet	Champion Hill
Egham Town	The Runnymede Stadium
Epsom & Ewell	Merland Rise (groundshare with Banstead Athletic)
Horsham	Queen Street
Leatherhead	Fetcham Grove
Lewes	The Dripping Pan
Metropolitan Police	Imber Court
Molesey	Walton Road Stadium
Staines Town	Wheatsheaf Park
Tooting & Mitcham United	Imperial Fields
Walton & Hersham	The Sports Ground
Whyteleafe	Church Road
Windsor & Eton	Stag Meadow
Worthing	Woodside Road

== Division Two ==
Isthmian League Division Two
- Season: 2002–03
- Champions: Cheshunt
- Promoted: Cheshunt; Leyton
- Matches: 240
- Goals: 798 (3.33 per match)
- Highest attendance: 221 – Cheshunt – Hungerford Town, (3 May)
- Total attendance: 15,730
- Average attendance: 75

At the end of the previous season most of the Division Two clubs were transferred to the newly created divisions One. Division Two consisted of 16 clubs, including two clubs from the previous season, 13 clubs promoted from the Division Three and Leyton promoted as champions of the Essex Senior League.

=== League table ===
Pos	Team	Pld	W	D	L	GF	GA	GD	Pts	Promotion or relegation
1	Cheshunt	30	25	3	2	91	29	+62	78	Promoted to Division One North
2	Leyton	30	21	5	4	77	22	+55	68	Promoted to Division One North
3	Flackwell Heath	30	17	3	10	52	44	+8	54	
4	Abingdon Town	30	14	11	5	65	42	+23	53	
5	Hungerford Town	30	12	12	6	49	36	+13	48	Transferred to the Hellenic League
6	Leighton Town	30	14	3	13	61	43	+18	45	
7	Witham Town	30	12	8	10	40	43	−3	44	
8	Ware	30	12	5	13	47	53	−6	41	
9	Clapton	30	12	5	13	40	47	−7	41	
10	Tring Town	30	11	5	14	49	58	−9	38	Absorbed into Tring Athletic
11	Kingsbury Town	30	9	11	10	38	48	−10	38	
12	Edgware Town	30	10	3	17	49	65	−16	33	
13	Wokingham Town	30	7	7	16	34	81	−47	28	
14	Dorking	30	6	6	18	49	63	−14	24	
15	Chalfont St Peter	30	6	5	19	34	63	−29	23	
16	Camberley Town	30	4	4	22	23	61	−38	16	

Rules for classification: 1) points; 2) goal difference; 3) number of goals scored.

=== Stadia and locations ===
Locations of Division Two clubs
Greater London Division Two clubs

Club	Stadium
Abingdon Town	Culham Road
Camberley Town	Kroomer Park
Chalfont St Peter	Mill Meadow
Cheshunt	Cheshunt Stadium
Clapton	The Old Spotted Dog Ground
Dorking	Meadowbank Stadium
Edgware Town	White Lion
Flackwell Heath	Wilks Park
Hungerford Town	Bulpit Lane
Kingsbury Town	Avenue Park
Leighton Town	Bell Close
Leyton	Leyton Stadium
Tring Town	Pendley Ground
Ware	Wodson Park
Witham Town	Spa Road
Wokingham Town	Cantley Park

== See also ==
- Isthmian League
- 2002–03 Northern Premier League
- 2002–03 Southern Football League
