= 2000–01 Essex Senior Football League =

The 2000–01 season was the 30th in the history of Essex Senior Football League a football competition in England.

The league featured 15 clubs which competed in the league last season, along with one new club:

- Barkingside, returned to the league system after leaving the Spartan South Midlands League in 1999

Brentwood were champions, winning their first Essex Senior League title.

== League table ==
Essex Senior Football League
- Season: 2000–01
- Champions: Brentwood
- Matches: 236
- Goals: 843 (3.57 per match)

Pos	Team	Pld	W	D	L	GF	GA	GD	Pts	Promotion or relegation
1	Brentwood	30	21	3	6	68	26	+42	66	
2	Saffron Walden Town	29	17	3	9	53	24	+29	57 (Note: Concord Rangers, Saffron Walden Town, Stansted and Woodford Town were awarded three points for unplayed matches against Barkingside and Sawbridgeworth Town.)	
3	Barkingside	27	17	5	5	55	34	+21	56	
4	Southend Manor	30	17	4	9	71	40	+31	55	
5	Concord Rangers	29	16	3	10	57	38	+19	54	
6	Ilford	30	15	5	10	64	47	+17	50	
7	Bowers United	30	13	8	9	54	46	+8	47	
8	Basildon United	30	13	6	11	65	48	+17	45	
9	Stansted	29	11	8	10	45	47	−2	44	
10	Leyton	30	12	7	11	50	43	+7	43	
11	Hullbridge Sports	30	12	4	14	62	60	+2	40	
12	East Ham United	30	12	3	15	52	73	−21	39	Merged into Barking & East Ham United
13	Sawbridgeworth Town	29	10	6	13	41	46	−5	36	
14	Burnham Ramblers	30	7	6	17	44	60	−16	27	
15	Eton Manor	30	3	5	22	39	92	−53	14	
16	Woodford Town	29	1	2	26	23	119	−96	8	

Source: fchd
Rules for classification: 1) points; 2) goal difference; 3) number of goals scored.
