= Paul Hayes (footballer) =

English footballer (born 1983)

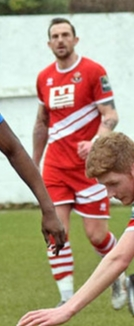
- Hayes playing for AFC Sudbury in February 2019.

Personal information
- Full name: Paul Edward Hayes
- Date of birth: 20 September 1983 (age 43)
- Place of birth: Dagenham, England
- Height: 6 ft 0 in (1.83 m)
- Position: Forward

Team information
- Current team: Stanway Rovers (assistant manager)

Youth career
- 1996–2001: Norwich City

Senior career*
Years	Team	Apps	(Gls)
2001–2002	Norwich City	0	(0)
2002–2005	Scunthorpe United	99	(28)
2005–2007	Barnsley	75	(11)
2007	→ Huddersfield Town (loan)	4	(1)
2007–2010	Scunthorpe United	129	(33)
2010–2011	Preston North End	23	(2)
2010–2011	→ Barnsley (loan)	7	(0)
2011–2012	Charlton Athletic	19	(3)
2012	→ Wycombe Wanderers (loan)	6	(6)
2012–2013	Brentford	23	(4)
2013	→ Crawley Town (loan)	11	(2)
2013	→ Plymouth Argyle (loan)	6	(0)
2013–2014	Scunthorpe United	16	(4)
2014–2017	Wycombe Wanderers	101	(19)
2017	Hemel Hempstead Town	0	(0)
2017–2018	Newport County	13	(3)
2018–2019	AFC Sudbury	32	(11)
2019	Romford	1	(0)
2019–2020	Meridian VP	3	(1)
2020	Faversham Town	9	(0)
2020	Chatham Town	3	(1)
2022–2023	Bowers & Pitsea	0	(0)
2023	Haverhill Rovers	7	(0)
2023–2024	Dunmow Town	8	(0)
2024–2026	Burnham Ramblers	12	(1)
Total		607	(130)

Managerial career
- 2023–2024: Dunmow Town
- 2024–2026: Burnham Ramblers
- * Club domestic league appearances and goals as of 16:03, 23 June 2026 (UTC)

Paul Edward Hayes (born 20 September 1983) is an English former professional footballer who is assistant manager of Isthmian League Premier Division club Stanway Rovers.

As a player, Hayes was a forward who made more than 500 appearances for 11 clubs in all three divisions of the English Football League, most notably for Scunthorpe United, Barnsley and Wycombe Wanderers. He also played professionally for Norwich City, Huddersfield Town, Charlton Athletic, Preston North End, Brentford, Crawley Town, Plymouth Argyle and Newport County. Hayes played his latter career in non-League football for Hemel Hempstead Town, AFC Sudbury, Romford, Meridian VP, Faversham Town, Chatham Town and Haverhill Rovers.

Since retiring as a player, Hayes has held sporting director roles at non-League clubs Chatham Town and Bowers & Pitsea. He has held managerial roles at Dunmow Town and Burnham Ramblers.

== Playing career ==
=== Norwich City ===
Hayes started his footballing career as a schoolboy with Norwich City, whom he joined as a 13-year-old. Hayes' first involvement with the first team came in pre-season prior to Norwich's 2001–02 First Division campaign, in which he scored in friendlies against Wroxham, Colchester United and Premier League club Arsenal. He was an unused substitute during the final two matches of the regular season. He failed to feature during Norwich's unsuccessful play-off campaign.

Hayes failed to feature at all during the early months of the 2002–03 season and became frustrated at his lack of first team opportunities, with forwards Iwan Roberts, Paul McVeigh, David Nielsen, Alex Notman, Zema Abbey and Ian Henderson ahead of him in the pecking order. He spent periods on trial at Third Division clubs Torquay United and Scunthorpe United and had his Norwich academy contract cancelled on 3 December 2002.

=== Scunthorpe United ===
Hayes signed a youth contract with Third Division club Scunthorpe United in December 2002. He scored his first goal for the club on his second appearance, with Scunthorpe's fourth goal in a 4–1 win over Southend United on 25 January 2003. On 19 March 2003, Hayes signed a professional contract with Scunthorpe. He scored eight goals in 20 games during the 2002–03 season, though the campaign ended with a play-off semi-final defeat to Lincoln City. Hayes became a regular starter the following season, making 45 appearances and scoring seven goals as Scunthorpe narrowly avoided relegation to the Conference.

Hayes scored 19 goals during the 2004–05 season to help Scunthorpe gain automatic promotion to League One. Hayes was in red hot form during October and November 2004, scoring 10 goals in as many games. A highlight of his season was scoring the opener against Premier League club Chelsea in an FA Cup third round at Stamford Bridge on 8 January 2005, though Chelsea eventually ran out 3–1 winners. Hayes departed Glanford Park on 2 June 2005, having scored 34 goals in 116 appearances for the club.

=== Barnsley ===
Hayes joined League One club Barnsley on 2 June 2005 and made 56 appearances and scored 13 goals during the 2005–06 season. He scored the opener in the 2006 League One play-off final against Swansea City and a 2–2 scoreline at the end of extra time saw the game go to penalties, with Hayes converting his spot kick to help Barnsley to a 4–3 shootout win and promotion to the Championship.

Hayes made 33 appearances for Barnsley during the 2006–07 season and scored five goals, which included a spell of four goals in six games early in the season. After falling behind Hungarian forward duo István Ferenczi and Péter Rajczi during the second half of the season, Hayes joined League One club Huddersfield Town on a one-month loan on 23 February 2007. On 10 March, he scored his only goal for the club in a 2–0 home victory over local neighbours Bradford City. Having joined with a view to a permanent move, he failed to win a contract or a loan extension and returned to Barnsley on 18 March, after scoring one goal in four appearances for Huddersfield Town. Hayes departed Oakwell on 13 June 2007 and made 89 appearances and scored 18 goals during two seasons with the club.

=== Return to Scunthorpe United ===
Hayes returned to Scunthorpe United (now playing in the Championship) on a three-year contract on 13 June 2007, for a fee which was later settled by tribunal. He made 42 appearances during the 2007–08 season, but a run of five goals in the last three games of the season couldn't save the Iron from relegation to League One. Hayes found his form again during the 2008–09 season, making 57 appearances and scoring 19 goals and helped the Iron to the Football League Trophy final and to promotion to the Championship via the play-offs.

Hayes had a solid 2009–10 season in the Championship, making 51 appearances and scoring 13 goals, which included a goal against Manchester City in a 4–2 FA Cup fourth round defeat on 24 January 2010. A contract dispute saw Hayes attract attention from former club Norwich City late in the season, but he left Glanford Park on 10 May 2010. Hayes made 150 appearances and scored 40 goals in his second spell with Scunthorpe United and was voted the club's 2009–10 Player of the Year.

=== Preston North End ===
On 10 May 2010, Hayes signed a three-year contract at Championship club Preston North End on a free transfer. He made 26 appearances and scored four goals for the financially-stricken club during the 2010–11 season. On 28 October 2010, Hayes returned to Barnsley on emergency loan until 1 January 2011, as a makeweight in the deal to extend Iain Hume's loan at Preston North End. He made seven appearances without scoring and returned to Deepdale when his loan expired. Personal problems and relegation to League One led Hayes to terminate his contract on 17 June 2011.

=== Charlton Athletic ===
On 21 June 2011, it was announced that Hayes was a third of a triple signing completed by League One club Charlton Athletic. He scored his first goal for Charlton in a 2–1 away win over Notts County on 13 August 2011. After the arrival and immediate impact of Yann Kermorgant, opportunities became limited for Hayes. On 24 February 2012, Hayes and Charlton Athletic teammate Gary Doherty joined League One club Wycombe Wanderers on loan until the end of the 2011–12 season. He scored six goals in six appearances and was recalled by Charlton Athletic on 23 March. He made 22 appearances and scored three goals during the 2011–12 season as Charlton won the League One title and secured promotion to the Championship. Hayes was made available for transfer by manager Chris Powell prior to the beginning of the 2012–13 season and departed the club on 20 August 2012.

=== Brentford ===
On 20 August 2012, Hayes signed a three-year contract with League One club Brentford on a free transfer. He made his debut as a substitute against Yeovil Town on 21 August 2012 and missed a penalty in a 3–1 defeat. He finally scored his first goals for the club with a brace in a 2–2 draw with Hartlepool United on 27 October, but after scoring just four further goals over the following five months, he joined League One club Crawley Town on one-month loan on 11 March 2013, which was later extended until the end of the season. He scored two goals in 11 appearances and returned to Brentford on 30 April. Hayes played a part in each of the Bees' three League One play-off matches, but the club missed out on promotion to the Championship after a 2–1 play-off final defeat to Yeovil Town.

Despite scoring three goals during the 2013–14 pre-season, Hayes was frozen out once the regular season started and was made available for loan by manager Uwe Rösler. He made his only appearance of the season in a 3–2 League Cup first round victory over hometown club Dagenham & Redbridge on 6 August. Hayes joined League Two club Plymouth Argyle on a one-month loan on 4 October 2013. He failed to score in six appearances for the Pilgrims and returned to Brentford when his loan expired. Hayes had his contract terminated on 3 December 2013 and made 33 appearances and scored six goals during 15 months at Griffin Park.

=== Scunthorpe United (third spell) ===
Hayes signed for Scunthorpe (now in League Two) for a third time in his career on 17 December 2013, on a contract running until the end of the 2013–14 season. He scored four goals in 16 appearances and helped the Iron to promotion to League One with a second-place finish. Hayes was released at the end of the season. Across his three spells with Scunthorpe United, Hayes made 282 appearances and scored 78 goals.

=== Return to Wycombe Wanderers ===
On 15 May 2014, Hayes returned to League Two club Wycombe Wanderers on a two-year contract. In just over three seasons with the Chairboys, he scored 27 goals in 120 appearances and helped the club to the 2015 League Two play-off final, which was lost on penalties to Southend United. Hayes left Wycombe by mutual consent on 29 August 2017 and across his two spells with the club, he made 126 appearances and scored 33 goals.

=== Hemel Hempstead Town ===
On 22 September 2017, Hayes dropped out of the EFL for the first team in his career to join National League South club Hemel Hempstead Town. Despite joining the club in a bid to regain his fitness, he failed to win a call into a squad before departing three weeks later.

=== Newport County ===
On 17 October 2017, Hayes returned to the Football League to join League Two club Newport County on a contract running until the end of the 2017–18 season. Due to registration regulations, Hayes was not able to make his Exiles debut until after 3 January 2018. Hayes finished the season with 14 appearances, three goals and was released when his contract expired.

=== Return to non-League football ===
On 9 August 2018, Hayes dropped back into non-League football to join Isthmian League North Division club AFC Sudbury on a two-year contract. He scored 12 goals in 34 appearances during the 2018–19 season and retired in June 2019. In mid-November 2019, Hayes returned to football as a player with Isthmian League North Division club Romford. After one appearance, he transferred to Southern Counties East League First Division club Meridian VP, with whom he remained until 7 January 2020, when he transferred to Isthmian League South East Division club Faversham Town. Hayes made 10 appearances before joining Southern Counties East League Premier Division club Chatham Town in a player-sporting director capacity March 2020. He made four appearances and scored one goal across the 2019–20 and 2020–21 seasons.

Concurrent with his director of football role at Isthmian League Premier Division club Bowers & Pitsea, Hayes made three cup appearances during the first half of the 2022–23 season. On 6 January 2023, he joined Eastern Counties League Premier Division club Haverhill Rovers and made seven appearances before departing the club in mid-February 2023.

== Managerial career and backroom roles ==
Hayes served Southern Counties East League Premier Division club Chatham Town as sporting director between 2020 and 2022. On 1 May 2022, Hayes was appointed director of football at Isthmian League Premier Division club Bowers & Pitsea. He departed the role in January 2023.

On 2 June 2023, Hayes was appointed manager of newly promoted Eastern Counties First Division South club Dunmow Town. Following defeat in the First Division South play-off final, Hayes departed the club at the end of the 2023–24 season. On 3 June 2024, Hayes was announced as manager of Eastern Counties First Division South club Burnham Ramblers. He presided over two mid-table finishes before joining Isthmian League Premier Division club Stanway Rovers as assistant manager in June 2026.

== Personal life ==
Born in Dagenham, Hayes grew up in East London and went to Barclay Junior School in Leyton, where he captained the school football team from the age of seven. He later attended Norlington School for Boys and The Bromfords School in Wickford, Essex. His older brother, Martin, is a football manager and former player and his son Noah was a member of the Charlton Athletic Academy. After retiring from football, Hayes began a career as an agent and launched Aspiro Lifestyle Management.

== Career statistics ==
As of match played 11 April 2026

Appearances and goals by club, season and competition
Club	Season	League			FA Cup		League Cup		Other		Total	
Club	Season	Division	Apps	Goals	Apps	Goals	Apps	Goals	Apps	Goals	Apps	Goals
Norwich City	2001–02	First Division	0	0	0	0	0	0	0	0	0	0
Scunthorpe United	2002–03	Third Division	18	8	0	0	—		2 (Note: Appearances in Third Division play-offs)	0	20	8
Scunthorpe United	2003–04	Third Division	35	2	5	2	2	2	3 (Note: Appearances in EFL Trophy)	1	45	7
Scunthorpe United	2004–05	League Two	46	18	3	1	1	0	1	0	51	19
Scunthorpe United	Total		99	28	8	3	3	2	6	1	116	34
Barnsley	2005–06	League One	45	6	5	5	2	0	4 (Note: Three appearances and two goals in League One play-offs, one appearance in Football League Trophy)	2	56	13
Barnsley	2006–07	Championship	30	5	2	0	1	0	—		33	5
Barnsley	Total		75	11	7	5	3	0	4	2	89	18
Huddersfield Town (loan)	2006–07	League One	4	1	—		—		—		4	1
Scunthorpe United	2007–08	Championship	40	8	1	0	1	0	—		42	8
Scunthorpe United	2008–09	League One	44	16	3	0	0	0	10 (Note: Seven appearances and three goals in Football League Trophy, three appearances in League One play-offs)	3	57	19
Scunthorpe United	2009–10	Championship	45	9	2	2	4	2	—		51	13
Scunthorpe United	Total		129	33	6	2	5	2	10	3	150	40
Preston North End	2010–11	Championship	23	2	1	0	2	2	—		26	4
Barnsley (loan)	2010–11	Championship	7	0	—		—		—		7	0
Charlton Athletic	2011–12	League One	19	3	2	0	0	0	1	0	22	3
Wycombe Wanderers (loan)	2011–12	League One	6	6	—		—		—		6	6
Brentford	2012–13	League One	23	4	5	1	0	0	4 (Note: Two appearances and one goal in Football League Trophy, two appearances in League One play-offs)	1	32	6
Brentford	2013–14	League One	0	0	0	0	1	0	—		1	0
Brentford	Total		23	4	5	1	1	0	4	1	33	6
Crawley Town (loan)	2012–13	League One	11	2	—		—		—		11	2
Plymouth Argyle (loan)	2013–14	League Two	6	0	—		—		1	0	7	0
Scunthorpe United	2013–14	League Two	16	4	—		—		—		16	4
Wycombe Wanderers	2014–15	League Two	39	12	2	1	1	0	3 (Note: Appearances in League Two play-offs)	2	45	15
Wycombe Wanderers	2015–16	League Two	37	4	3	1	1	0	0	0	41	5
Wycombe Wanderers	2016–17	League Two	23	3	4	3	0	0	4 (Note: Appearances in EFL Trophy)	1	31	7
Wycombe Wanderers	2017–18	League Two	2	0	—		1	0	—		3	0
Wycombe Wanderers	Total		101	19	9	5	3	0	7	3	120	27
Newport County	2017–18	League Two	13	3	1	0	—		—		14	3
AFC Sudbury	2018–19	Isthmian League North Division	32	11	5	1	—		3 (Note: One appearance in FA Trophy, one appearance in Isthmian League Cup, one appearance in Suffolk Premier Cup)	0	40	12
Romford	2019–20	Isthmian League North Division	1	0	—		—		—		1	0
Meridian VP	2019–20	Southern Counties East League First Division	3	1	—		—		1 (Note: Appearance in London Senior Trophy)	2	4	3
Faversham Town	2019–20	Isthmian League South East Division	9	0	—		—		1 (Note: Appearance in Kent Senior Cup)	0	10	0
Chatham Town	2019–20	Southern Counties East League Premier Division	2	1	—		—		—		2	1
Chatham Town	2020–21	Southern Counties East League Premier Division	1	0	1	0	—		—		2	0
Chatham Town	Total		3	1	1	0	—		—		4	1
Bowers & Pitsea	2022–23	Isthmian League Premier Division	0	0	1	0	—		2 (Note: One appearance in FA Trophy, one appearance in Essex Senior Cup)	0	3	0
Haverhill Rovers	2022–23	Eastern Counties League Premier Division	7	0	—		—		—		7	0
Dunmow Town	2023–24	Eastern Counties League First Division South	8	0	0	0	—		0	0	8	0
Burnham Ramblers	2024–25	Eastern Counties League First Division South	6	0	0	0	—		1 (Note: Appearance in FA Vase)	0	7	0
Burnham Ramblers	2025–26	Eastern Counties League First Division South	6	1	0	0	—		1 (Note: Appearance in Eastern Counties League Challenge Cup)	0	7	1
Burnham Ramblers	Total		12	1	0	0	—		2	0	14	1
Career total			607	130	46	17	17	6	42	12	712	165

== Honours ==
Scunthorpe United

- Football League One play-offs: 2009
- Football League Two second-place promotion: 2004–05, 2013–14
- Football League Trophy runner-up: 2008–09

Barnsley

- Football League One play-offs: 2006

Charlton Athletic

- Football League One: 2011–12

Individual

- Scunthorpe United Player of the Year: 2009–10
