= Jermaine Francis =

Footballer (born 2002)

Personal information
- Full name: Jermaine Lamar Jordan Francis
- Date of birth: 15 March 2002 (age 24)
- Place of birth: Ealing, England
- Height: 1.76 m (5 ft 9 in)
- Position: Winger

Team information
- Current team: Sutton United
- Number: 20

Youth career
- Queens Park Rangers
- Reading
- 2019–2020: London Tigers

Senior career*
Years	Team	Apps	(Gls)
2020–2021	DTFC	9	(7)
2021–2022	Coggeshall Town	21	(6)
2022	DTFC	4	(2)
2022–2023	Hashtag United	43	(18)
2023	Cannons Wood	1	(0)
2023–2024	Chelmsford City	42	(9)
2024–2025	Barnet	5	(0)
2024–2025	→ Braintree Town (loan)	29	(8)
2025–2026	Hartlepool United	22	(3)
2026–	Sutton United	17	(1)

International career^{‡}
2023–	Grenada	21	(3)
- * Club domestic league appearances and goals as of 21:38, 19 August 2026 (UTC) ‡ National team caps and goals as of 22:12, 10 September 2026 (UTC)

Jermaine Lamar Jordan Francis (born 15 March 2002) is a professional footballer who plays as a winger for National League club Sutton United. Born in England, he represents the Grenada national team at international level.

== Club career ==
Francis began his career in the academies at Queens Park Rangers and Reading, before moving to London Tigers to play for their under-19's. Whilst studying at Uxbridge College, Francis played for Chelsea's under-19 representative college team, despite not playing for the club's academy.

Following his spell at London Tigers, Francis joined Essex Alliance League side DTFC. In August 2021, Francis signed for Coggeshall Town. During his time at Coggeshall, Francis made 25 appearances in all competitions, scoring eight goals. Francis left Coggeshall in February 2022, playing the remainder of the season out with DTFC, scoring two goals in four league games.

In February 2022, Francis joined Hashtag United. During the 2022–23 season, Francis scored 14 goals in 30 league appearances as Hashtag United won the Isthmian League North Division.

On 15 August 2023, following a trial at Barnet and a single appearance for Cannons Wood, Francis signed for National League South side Chelmsford City. On 14 May 2024, it was announced Francis had departed Chelmsford, in order to sign for a club in a higher division. The following day he signed for Barnet. In September 2024, he joined Braintree Town on loan until January 2025.

Francis joined Hartlepool United for an undisclosed fee on 7 July 2025. In January 2026, he joined Sutton United.

== International career ==
On 8 September 2023, Francis made his debut for Grenada, coming on as a 76th minute substitute in a 1–1 draw against Suriname. On 15 November 2024, he scored his first international goal against Saint Lucia.

== Career statistics ==
=== Club ===
As of match played 18 August 2026

Appearances and goals by club, season and competition
Club	Season	League			FA Cup		EFL Cup		Other		Total	
Club	Season	Division	Apps	Goals	Apps	Goals	Apps	Goals	Apps	Goals	Apps	Goals
DTFC	2020–21	Essex Alliance League Senior Division	No data currently available									
Coggeshall Town	2021–22	Isthmian League North Division	21	6	1	0	—		1 (Note: Appearance in Alan Turvey Trophy)	1	23	7
DTFC	2021–22	Essex Alliance League Senior Division	No data currently available									
Hashtag United	2021–22	Isthmian League North Division	13	4	—		—		—		13	4
Hashtag United	2022–23	Isthmian League North Division	30	14	0	0	—		0	0	30	14
Hashtag United	Total		43	18	0	0	0	0	0	0	43	18
Cannons Wood	2023–24	Eastern Counties League Division One South	1	0	0	0	—		0	0	1	0
Chelmsford City	2023–24	National League South	42	9	5	1	—		4 (Note: Three appearances in FA Trophy, one appearance and one goal in National League South play-offs)	1	51	11
Barnet	2024–25	National League	5	0	—		—		—		5	0
Braintree Town (loan)	2024–25	National League	29	8	1	0	—		5 (Note: Appearance(s) in National League Cup)	1	35	9
Hartlepool United	2025–26	National League	22	3	1	0	—		0	0	23	3
Sutton United	2025–26	National League	15	1	0	0	—		0	0	15	1
Sutton United	2026–27	National League	2	0	0	0	—		1	0	3	0
Sutton United	Total		17	1	0	0	0	0	1	0	18	1
Career total			179	45	8	1	0	0	10	3	200	49

=== International ===
As of match played 30 March 2026

Appearances and goals by national team and year
National team	Year	Apps	Goals
Grenada	2023	4	0
Grenada	2024	8	1
Grenada	2025	3	2
Grenada	2026	3	0
Total		18	3

Scores and results list Grenada's goal tally first, score column indicates score after each Francis goal.

List of international goals scored by Jermaine Francis
No.	Date	Venue	Opponent	Score	Result	Competition	Ref.
1	15 November 2024	Ergilio Hato Stadium, Willemstad, Curaçao	Saint Lucia	1–0	4–0	2024–25 CONCACAF Nations League B	
2	4 June 2025	Kirani James Athletic Stadium, St. George's, Grenada	Bahamas	1–0	6–0	2026 FIFA World Cup qualification	
3	10 June 2025	Warner Park Sporting Complex, Basseterre, Saint Kitts and Nevis	Saint Kitts and Nevis	2–1	3–2	2026 FIFA World Cup qualification	

== Honours ==
Hashtag United

- Isthmian League North Division: 2022–23

Barnet

- National League: 2024–25
