= 2009–10 Essex Senior Football League =

The 2009–10 season was the 39th in the history of Essex Senior Football League a football competition in England.

The league featured 15 clubs which competed in the league last season, along with three new clubs:

- Bethnal Green United, promoted from the Middlesex County League
- Tiptree United, transferred from the Eastern Counties League
- Witham Town, relegated from the Isthmian League

Also, Mauritius Sports & Pennant changed name to Mauritius Sports Association.

Stansted were champions, winning their first Essex Senior League title, but were not promoted due to ground grading requirements.

== League table ==
Essex Senior Football League
- Season: 2009–10
- Champions: Stansted
- Matches: 306
- Goals: 1,035 (3.38 per match)

Pos	Team	Pld	W	D	L	GF	GA	GD	Pts	Promotion or relegation
1	Stansted	34	22	8	4	99	35	+64	74	
2	Witham Town	34	22	5	7	81	44	+37	68 (Note: Witham Town were deducted three points.)	
3	Burnham Ramblers	34	20	7	7	86	44	+42	67	
4	Enfield 1893	34	19	7	8	63	38	+25	63 (Note: Enfield 1893 were deducted one point.)	
5	Bethnal Green United	34	17	10	7	73	38	+35	61	
6	Southend Manor	34	15	9	10	66	47	+19	54	
7	Barking	34	16	6	12	49	33	+16	54	
8	Takeley	34	16	7	11	55	40	+15	52 (Note: Takeley were deducted three points.)	
9	Barkingside	34	15	10	9	62	50	+12	52 (Note: Barkingside were deducted three points.)	
10	Sawbridgeworth Town	34	13	6	15	44	75	−31	45	
11	Hullbridge Sports	34	10	10	14	50	54	−4	40	
12	Basildon United	34	12	6	16	47	69	−22	39 (Note: Basildon United were deducted three points.)	
13	London APSA	34	10	7	17	38	55	−17	37	
14	Tiptree United	34	11	1	22	49	82	−33	34	Merged with Maldon Town
15	Eton Manor	34	8	9	17	57	71	−14	33	
16	Clapton	34	9	3	22	38	86	−48	30	
17	Bowers & Pitsea	34	8	5	21	48	77	−29	29	
18	Mauritius Sports	34	3	4	27	30	97	−67	13	

Source: fchd
Rules for classification: 1) points; 2) goal difference; 3) number of goals scored.
