= Iain O'Connell =

English footballer

Personal information
- Full name: Iain Andrew O'Connell
- Date of birth: 9 October 1970 (age 56)
- Place of birth: Rochford, England
- Position: Central defender

Team information
- Current team: Great Wakering Rovers

Youth career
- 1987–1989: Southend United

Senior career*
Years	Team	Apps	(Gls)
1989–1990	Southend United	4	(0)
1990–1997	Dover Athletic		
1997–2003	Margate		
2003–2005	Chelmsford City		
2005–2007	Great Wakering Rovers		

Managerial career
- 2005–2010: Great Wakering Rovers
- 2010–2011: Margate
- 2017–2018: Great Wakering Rovers
- 2022–: Great Wakering Rovers
- * Club domestic league appearances and goals

Iain Andrew O'Connell (born 9 October 1970) is an English former footballer who played as a central defender. He is manager of Great Wakering Rovers.

== Playing career ==
After playing for the club as a youth player, O'Connell signed professional terms with hometown club Southend United in 1989. O'Connell made four Football League appearances for the club during the 1989–90 season, before being released. In 1990, O'Connell signed for Dover Athletic, making over 250 appearances in seven years at the club. In August 1997, O'Connell joined fellow Kent club Margate for a fee of £4,000. O'Connell made over 200 appearances in all competitions for Margate, scoring 19 times. On 24 December 2003, O'Connell signed for Chelmsford City. Chelmsford initially made an offer for O'Connell in the summer of 2003, however he declined the offer in order to stay at Margate.

== Managerial career ==
In February 2005, O'Connell was appointed player-manager of Great Wakering Rovers. In the 2007–08 season, O'Connell retired from playing, focusing solely on managing Great Wakering. In February 2010, O'Connell returned to Margate as manager, before leaving in March 2011. In February 2017, O'Connell returned to Great Wakering Rovers as manager. O'Connell guided the club to the 2017–18 Essex Senior League title, before resigning from his post in July 2018. He returned as manager of Great Wakering in May 2022.
