= 2013–14 Essex Senior Football League =

The 2013–14 season was the 43rd in the history of Essex Senior Football League a football competition in England.

The league featured 17 clubs which competed in the league last season, along with three new clubs:

- FC Romania, promoted from the Middlesex County League
- Ilford, relegated from the Isthmian League
- Haringey Borough, transferred from the Spartan South Midlands League

Also, Haringey & Waltham Development changed name to Greenhouse London, while Bethnal Green United changed name to Tower Hamlets.

Great Wakering Rovers were champions, winning their second Essex Senior League title and returned to the Isthmian League after two seasons in the Essex Senior League.

== League table ==
Essex Senior Football League
- Season: 2013–14
- Champions: Great Wakering Rovers
- Promoted: Great Wakering Rovers
- Matches: 380
- Goals: 1,325 (3.49 per match)

Pos	Team	Pld	W	D	L	GF	GA	GD	Pts	Promotion or relegation
1	Great Wakering Rovers	38	29	5	4	112	40	+72	92	Promoted to the Isthmian League
2	Haringey Borough	38	29	4	5	103	31	+72	91	
3	Enfield 1893	38	29	4	5	102	37	+65	91	
4	Tower Hamlets	38	24	7	7	73	48	+25	79	
5	FC Romania	38	21	9	8	82	56	+26	72	
6	Sawbridgeworth Town	38	22	5	11	87	59	+28	71	
7	Takeley	38	17	5	16	64	72	−8	56	
8	Basildon United	38	16	7	15	85	69	+16	55	
9	Hullbridge Sports	38	15	8	15	51	51	0	53	
10	Clapton	38	14	8	16	54	54	0	50	
11	Eton Manor	38	12	11	15	54	72	−18	47	
12	Barking	38	13	7	18	61	60	+1	46	
13	Bowers & Pitsea	38	11	10	17	60	72	−12	43	
14	Sporting Bengal United	38	12	8	18	74	99	−25	41 (Note: Sporting Bengal United deducted three points.)	
15	London APSA	38	10	8	20	53	70	−17	38	
16	Ilford	38	9	7	22	50	86	−36	34	
17	Stansted	38	8	8	22	50	87	−37	32	
18	Greenhouse London	38	6	12	20	43	85	−42	30	
19	Southend Manor	38	6	9	23	38	81	−43	27	
20	London Bari	38	3	6	29	29	96	−67	15	

Source: FA Full-Time
Rules for classification: 1) points; 2) goal difference; 3) number of goals scored.

=== Results ===
Home \ Away	BAR	BAU	BOP	CLA	ENF	ETO	FCR	GWR	GHL	HAY	HUL	ILF	LAP	LBA	SAW	SOM	SPO	STA	TAK	TOH
Barking		1–2	4–0	1–3	4–0	5–0	0–3	2–2	3–3	1–2	1–2	0–3	2–4	4–0	2–1	3–0	1–2	2–2	3–4	1–2
Basildon United	6–1		2–0	2–0	1–3	2–2	2–2	1–4	2–0	1–2	1–0	7–1	3–3	5–0	1–2	1–1	8–5	2–0	2–3	1–2
Bowers & Pitsea	0–2	3–1		0–0	2–2	1–2	0–3	2–5	2–2	1–5	3–0	3–3	2–2	2–0	0–1	2–4	4–1	2–2	3–0	5–1
Clapton	1–0	1–0	0–1		1–1	2–1	1–3	1–0	2–2	1–1	3–1	4–0	5–0	2–1	0–3	2–0	0–1	2–2	2–0	2–3
Enfield 1893	1–0	1–0	2–0	4–0		2–0	5–3	2–1	1–0	1–2	2–0	5–2	2–1	7–0	3–0	5–0	4–3	4–1	5–0	4–1
Eton Manor	0–0	5–1	1–1	3–1	1–4		1–4	1–1	0–0	0–4	0–0	0–3	1–1	3–0	1–1	1–1	5–2	4–1	2–3	0–5
FC Romania	2–1	3–3	3–2	4–2	2–1	3–0		2–4	4–2	0–0	1–3	1–0	1–3	2–0	1–2	3–2	2–3	1–0	5–1	1–1
Great Wakering Rovers	3–1	1–1	7–2	2–1	2–2	6–1	2–0		5–0	2–1	1–0	6–0	4–1	6–1	4–0	2–1	3–2	5–0	4–0	2–0
Greenhouse London	1–2	– (Note: Match not played as rescheduled date was beyond the final allowed date of the season; win awarded to Greenhouse London.)	1–0	3–2	2–5	1–2	1–1	0–2		1–2	1–3	1–1	0–4	1–1	1–6	2–1	1–1	2–5	1–1	1–3
Haringey Borough	2–0	6–0	4–1	2–1	2–0	2–1	1–2	4–2	3–0		3–1	3–2	2–0	4–1	2–0	5–0	3–0	5–0	3–0	3–0
Hullbridge Sports	1–1	1–2	3–2	0–0	3–2	0–0	1–2	0–1	2–0	1–5		0–1	2–1	5–2	2–1	0–0	1–0	2–1	1–1	2–0
Ilford	0–1	3–5	2–1	1–1	0–2	1–2	0–2	1–3	4–0	0–2	0–4		1–0	2–0	0–2	3–3	2–2	3–1	0–1	0–3
London APSA	1–1	1–2	0–2	1–2	1–1	0–1	0–2	3–1	2–2	3–2	1–2	3–1		1–1	1–4	0–2	4–2	1–1	3–1	1–2
London Bari	1–2	1–4	0–2	0–2	0–1	2–3	3–3	0–2	0–1	0–2	1–1	0–1	3–1		0–4	0–0	2–1	0–2	0–1	2–3
Sawbridgeworth Town	2–1	3–2	1–1	3–1	0–2	6–3	5–2	0–1	4–3	3–1	0–2	2–2	4–2	5–1		3–2	2–2	3–2	2–1	1–1
Southend Manor	0–4	1–0	0–1	2–1	1–4	0–0	1–4	0–2	1–2	0–0	1–1	4–1	0–1	4–0	1–7		0–3	0–2	0–2	0–2
Sporting Bengal United	1–2	2–2	2–5	3–2	0–6	2–1	1–1	2–6	2–2	0–7	3–1	1–1	0–1	2–1	4–0	6–2		3–1	2–7	1–2
Stansted	0–0	0–6	1–1	1–2	1–2	1–3	1–1	2–4	3–1	1–3	2–1	4–1	2–1	0–1	2–1	1–1	2–6		1–3	0–3
Takeley	0–2	2–3	2–0	2–1	0–3	1–2	0–0	1–2	0–0	2–2	2–1	4–2	3–0	3–2	0–2	3–1	5–1	3–2		1–4
Tower Hamlets	3–0	3–1	1–1	0–0	0–1	2–1	1–3	2–2	3–2	2–1	3–1	3–2	1–0	2–2	2–1	2–1	0–0	2–0	3–1	

Legend: Blue = home team win; Yellow = draw; Red = away team win.
