= DTFC =

DTFC may refer to one of the following association football clubs:

In England:

- Cannons Wood F.C., formerly named DTFC
- Darlaston Town F.C.
- Daventry Town F.C.
- Deal Town F.C.
- Dereham Town F.C.
- Desborough Town F.C.
- Devizes Town F.C.
- Didcot Town F.C.
- Dinnington Town F.C.
- Desborough Town F.C.
- Diss Town F.C.
- Dorchester Town F.C.
- Downham Town F.C.
- Dudley Town F.C.
- Dunstable Town F.C.
- Dronfield Town F.C.

In Scotland:

- Dalkeith Thistle F.C.
- Dalry Thistle F.C.

In Northern Ireland:

- Dungannon Tigers F.C.

In China:

- Dandong Tengyue F.C.

In New Zealand:

- Dunedin Technical F.C.

In the United States:

- Dallas Trinity FC
