= Lewis Francis =

Anguillan footballer

Personal information
- Full name: Lewis Spencer Francis
- Date of birth: 1 July 1993 (age 33)
- Place of birth: Gravesend, Kent, England
- Positions: Winger; striker

Senior career*
Years	Team	Apps	(Gls)
2012–2014	Romford	42	(10)
2014–2015	Barkingside	36	(3)
2015	Redbridge	11	(0)
	Witham Town	14	(1)
- Cheshunt
	Newham	2	(1)
2016–2017	Tilbury	22	(3)
2017	Enfield 1893	23	(10)
2017	Sporting Bengal United	6	(2)
2017	Sawbridgeworth Town	7	(4)
2017	Hadley	9	(4)
2017–2019	Saffron Walden Town	44	(33)
2019–2020	Walthamstow	14	(9)
2020	Saffron Walden Town	4	(2)
2020	Enfield	6	(1)
2021	Clapton	0	(0)
2021	Hullbridge Sports	3	(0)
2021	Sporting Bengal United	3	(1)
2021–2022	Stanway Rovers	17	(2)
2022–	Saffron Walden Town	3	(1)

International career^{‡}
2022–	Anguilla	1	(0)
- * Club domestic league appearances and goals ‡ National team caps and goals as of 27 January 2022

Lewis Spencer Francis (born 1 July 1993) is an Anguillan footballer who plays as a winger/ striker for Essex Senior League club Saffron Walden Town and for the Anguilla national football team.

== Club career ==
=== Romford ===
For the 2012–13 season he joined Romford. He rejoined the club for the following season. In his time at the club he made 62 appearances for the club in all competitions and scored 13 goals.

=== Barkingside ===
In early 2014 he joined Barkingside. During the 2014–15 season he made 42 appearances and scored six goals of which 36 appearances were in the league with three goals.

=== Redbridge ===
Francis joined Redbridge in the 2015–16 season, making twelve appearances for the club, with no goals scored.

=== Witham Town ===
In December 2015 he joined Witham Town. He scored on his debut on Boxing Day, his only league goal for the club in fourteen appearances.

=== Cheshunt ===
He then joined Cheshunt.

=== Newham ===
He made three appearances for Newham in the 2015–16 season, scoring once.

=== Enfield 1893 ===
In the 2015–16 season he also played for Enfield 1893 and scored six goals in 12 appearances in all competitions. He also played a further 14 matches for the club the next season, scoring six goals.

=== Tilbury ===
In the 2016–17 season he played for Tilbury scoring four goals in 26 appearances of which three goals came in 21 league appearances.

=== Sporting Bengal United ===
Towards the end of the 2016–17 season he spent some time playing for Sporting Bengal United. He made six appearances, scoring twice.

=== Sawbridgeworth Town ===
He then joined Sawbridgeworth Town at the beginning of the 2017–18 season enjoying a prolific time with the club, scoring eight goals in the ten appearances in all competitions.

=== Hadley ===
In the 2017–18 season he played for Hadley, scoring four goals.

=== Saffron Walden Town ===
He next joined Saffron Walden Town In the 2018–19 season he was a prolific goalscorer for the club, scoring 31 times in 49 appearances in all competitions and at the end of the season he gained three awards - Players Players of the Year, Manager's Player of the Year and Supporter's Player of the Year. During his second season with the club he scored seven goals in 17 matches in all competitions. He was diagnosed and treated for autism and bipolar disorder, with the club pledging to support him whilst he was treated.

=== Walthamstow ===
He played for Walthamstow, joining the club in November 2019 and where he scored 11 goals in 19 appearances in all competitions during the 2019–20 season.

=== Saffron Walden Town ===
He rejoined Saffron Walden Town scoring a hat-trick in the club's FA Cup victory over Little Oakley in September 2020, part of six goals in seven appearances for the club.

=== Enfield ===
In October 2020 he joined Enfield. He scored once for the club in six appearances in all competitions.

=== Clapton ===
He next joined Clapton in spring 2021. He did not appear for the club in the league and scored once in four appearances.

=== Hullbridge Sports ===
In June 2021 he joined Hullbridge Sports. He departed from the club having made four appearances, three in league and one in the FA Cup.

=== Sporting Bengal United ===
He then moved to Sporting Bengal United, scoring one goal in four appearances for the club.

=== Stanway Rovers ===
He next joined Stanway Rovers in late 2021 staying with the club until March 2022.

=== Saffron Walden Town ===
He rejoined his former club for another spell in March 2022, scoring on his first game back with the team after coming on as a substitute.

== International career ==
Francis made his senior international debut for Anguilla on 27 January 2022 in a 2–1 victory over British Virgin Islands in a behind closed doors friendly match played at Bisham Abbey in England.

== Career statistics ==
=== International ===
As of match played 27 January 2022

National team	Year	Apps	Goals
Anguilla	2022	1	0
Total		1	0
