= Barclay Primary School =

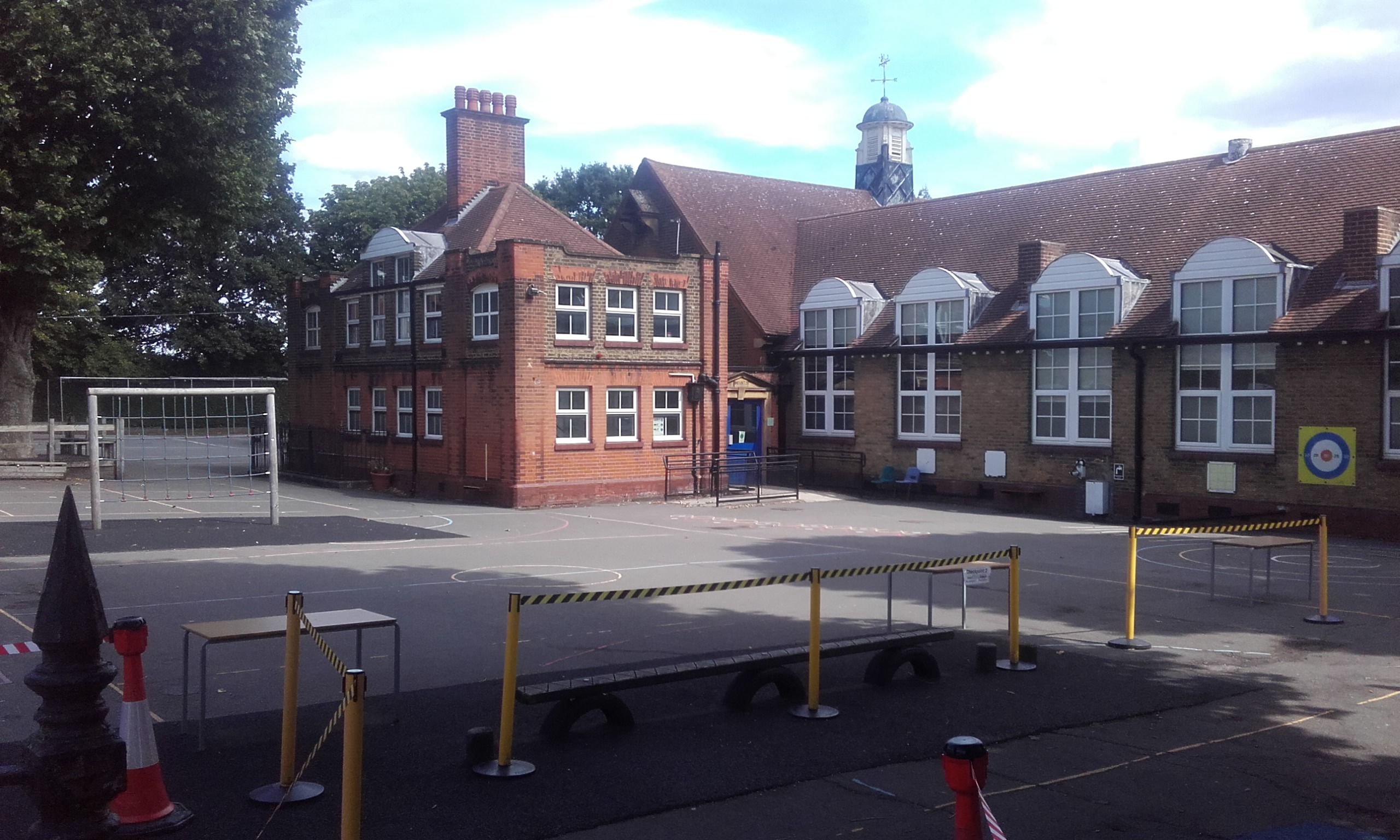

Location
- 155 Canterbury Road; Leyton; London, E10 6EJ
- Coordinates: 51.576°N 0.001°W

Information
- Type: Academy
- Established: 1908 (as Canterbury Road Council School) 2006 (as primary school) 2012 (as academy)
- Trust: Lion Academy Trust
- Department for Education URN: 138690 Tables
- Ofsted: Reports
- Executive headteacher: Mr Justin James
- Gender: Co-educational
- Age: 3 to 11
- Enrollment: 1293
- Capacity: 1260
- Website: www.barclayprimary.net

Barclay Primary School is a primary school located in Leyton, east London, England; Leyton is part of the London Borough of Waltham Forest. The school provides education for some 1293 children aged up to 11, and operates a nursery school taking children from the age of 3; on entry to main-school reception classes, children are between 4 and 5 years old.

It was formed in 2006 through the amalgamation of the former Barclay Junior School and Barclay Infants' School, which had operated as two adjacent schools on the same overall site.

== History ==
The Barclay Junior Mixed and Infants Schools originated as Canterbury Road Council School, which opened in 1908 in temporary buildings; the permanent school was completed in 1910. It was enlarged and reorganized in 1914–15 for boys, girls, and infants, but the boys remained in temporary accommodation in St. Andrew's and St. Paul's church halls until 1924, when a new building was opened for them.

The school was enlarged again in 1929–31, and an extension was completed in 1952. The amalgamation of the former infant and junior schools in September 2006 produced the new name, Barclay Primary School. The school was further expanded in 2011 to facilitate an increase from four-form to six-form entry from September of that year. It amongst the largest primary schools in England, which are known unofficially as "Titan" primaries. The school converted to academy status on 1 September 2012.

The name of the school comes from The BARCLAY PARK estate, on which the buildings stand; the estate was built up in the 19th century by the Barclay family of well known bankers who lived nearby at Knotts Green House.

The school continues to serve a broad and diverse community - which was recognised by Ofsted as being "Outstanding" in all areas in 2016 and again in 2021.

== Demographics ==
As of 16 January 2020, Barclay Primary School educated 658 male pupils and 635 female pupils. 21.2% of pupils were eligible for free school meals. The school has 54 teachers, 28 teaching assistants, and 24 other members of staff.

The pupil:teacher ratio is currently 21:1 and the mean gross full-time equivalent salary of all teachers is £39,215.

== Alumni ==
Notable attendees include the football player Paul Hayes and popular pianist Bobby Crush.
