= 2001–02 Norwich City F.C. season =

Norwich City
2001–02 season
- Chairman: Bob Cooper
- Manager: Nigel Worthington
- Stadium: Carrow Road
- First Division: 6th
- FA Cup: Third round
- League Cup: Second round
- Top goalscorer: League: Iwan Roberts (14); All: Iwan Roberts (14)
- Highest home attendance: 21,251
- Lowest home attendance: 15,710
- Average home league attendance: 18,629
Home colours	Away colours

During the 2001–02 English football season, Norwich City F.C. competed in the Football League First Division.

== Season summary ==
Despite losing 4–0 to Millwall on the opening day of the season, 2001–02 was a successful one for Norwich City. The Canaries never dropped out of the top 10 in Division One following their opening result and sneaked into the playoff places on the last day, following a 2–0 win over Stockport County. Their FA Cup run was halted at the third round after losing 4–0 to Chelsea after a replay. The game featured a memorable backheeled goal by Chelsea's Italian forward Gianfranco Zola. Norwich's League Cup run was equally disappointing, losing 1–0 away to Brentford away in the first round. Norwich faced Wolverhampton Wanderers in the First Division playoff semi final, defeating them 3–2 on aggregate, setting up a tie with Birmingham City in the final. The Canaries were eventually defeated on penalties at the Millennium Stadium in Cardiff after Iwan Roberts had opened the scoring for Norwich in extra time, following a goalless 90 minutes.

== Final league table ==
Pos	Team	Pld	W	D	L	GF	GA	GD	Pts	Qualification or relegation
4	Millwall	46	22	11	13	69	48	+21	77	Qualification for the First Division play-offs
5	Birmingham City (O, P)	46	21	13	12	70	49	+21	76	Qualification for the First Division play-offs
6	Norwich City	46	22	9	15	60	51	+9	75	Qualification for the First Division play-offs
7	Burnley	46	21	12	13	70	62	+8	75	
8	Preston North End	46	20	12	14	71	59	+12	72	

Rules for classification: 1) Points; 2) Goal difference; 3) Goals scored
(O) Play-off winners; (P) Promoted

== Results ==
All results referenced from statto.com

=== Football League First Division ===
11 August 2001 1	Millwall	4–0	Norwich City	London
				Stadium: The New Den

18 August 2001 2	Norwich City	2–0	Manchester City	Norwich
				Stadium: Carrow Road

25 August 2001 3	Wimbledon	0–1	Norwich City

27 August 2001 4	Norwich City	2–0	Sheffield Wednesday	Norwich
				Stadium: Carrow Road

8 September 2001 5	Norwich City	1–0	Nottingham Forest	Norwich
				Stadium: Carrow Road

15 September 2001 6	Rotherham United	1–1	Norwich City

18 September 2001 7	Norwich City	3–1	Watford	Norwich
				Stadium: Carrow Road

22 September 2001 8	Norwich City	2–1	Burnley	Norwich
				Stadium: Carrow Road

26 September 2001 9	Preston North End	4–0	Norwich City

29 September 2001 10	Sheffield United	2–1	Norwich City

9 October 2001 11	Walsall	2–0	Norwich City

13 October 2001 12	Gillingham	0–2	Norwich City

19 October 2001 13	Norwich City	2–0	West Bromwich Albion	Norwich
				Stadium: Carrow Road

23 October 2001 14	Norwich City	0–0	Portsmouth	Norwich
				Stadium: Carrow Road

28 October 2001 15	Crystal Palace	3–2	Norwich City

30 October 2001 16	Grimsby Town	0-2	Norwich City

3 November 2001 17	Norwich City	2–0	Wolverhampton Wndrs	Norwich
				Stadium: Carrow Road

10 November 2001 18	Norwich City	1–4	Bradford City	Norwich
				Stadium: Carrow Road

15 November 2001 19	Stockport County	2-1	Norwich City

20 November 2001 20	Norwich City	2–2	Crewe Alexandra	Norwich
				Stadium: Carrow Road

24 November 2001 21	Norwich City	2–1	Barnsley	Norwich
				Stadium: Carrow Road

2 December 2001 22	Portsmouth	1-2	Norwich City

8 December 2001 23	Birmingham City	4–0	Norwich City

15 December 2001 24	Norwich City	2–0	Coventry City	Norwich
				Stadium: Carrow Road

22 December 2001 25	Norwich City	2–1	Wimbledon	Norwich
				Stadium: Carrow Road

26 December 2001 26	Nottingham Forest	2–0	Norwich City

29 December 2001 27	Sheffield Wednesday	0–5	Norwich City

1 January 2002 28	Norwich City	1–1	Walsall	Norwich
				Stadium: Carrow Road

13 January 2002 29	Manchester City	3–1	Norwich City

20 January 2002 30	Norwich City	0–0	Millwall	Norwich
				Stadium: Carrow Road

29 January 2002 31	Crewe Alexandra	1-0	Norwich City

3 February 2002 32	Norwich City	2–1	Sheffield United	Norwich
				Stadium: Carrow Road

10 February 2002 33	West Bromwich Albion	1-0	Norwich City

22 February 2002 34	Norwich City	3–0	Preston North End	Norwich
				Stadium: Carrow Road

26 February 2002 35	Watford	2-1	Norwich City

2 March 2002 36	Burnley	1–1	Norwich City

5 March 2002 37	Norwich City	0–0	Rotherham United	Norwich
				Stadium: Carrow Road

9 March 2002 38	Coventry City	2-1	Norwich City

15 March 2002 39	Norwich City	0–1	Birmingham City	Norwich
				Stadium: Carrow Road

19 March 2002 40	Norwich City	2–1	Gillingham	Norwich
				Stadium: Carrow Road

23 March 2002 41	Wolverhampton Wndrs	0–0	Norwich City

30 March 2002 42	Norwich City	2–1	Crystal Palace	Norwich
				Stadium: Carrow Road

1 April 2002 43	Bradford City	0–1	Norwich City

6 April 2002 44	Norwich City	1–1	Grimsby Town	Norwich
				Stadium: Carrow Road

13 April 2002 45	Barnsley	0–2	Norwich City

21 April 2002 46	Norwich City	2–0	Stockport County	Norwich
				Stadium: Carrow Road

=== Play-offs ===
28 April 2002 Semi-final	Norwich City	3–1	Wolverhampton Wanderers	Norwich
				Stadium: Carrow Road

1 May 2002 Semi-final	Wolverhampton Wanderers	1–0	Norwich City	Wolverhampton
				Stadium: Molineux Stadium

12 May 2002 Final	Norwich City	1–1 (aet)	Birmingham City	Cardiff
		Main Article		Stadium: Millennium Stadium

=== FA Cup ===
5 January 2002 3	Norwich City	0–0	Chelsea	Norwich
				Stadium: Carrow Road

5 January 2002 3 Replay	Chelsea	4–0	Norwich City	Chelsea
				Stadium: Stamford Bridge Stadium

=== League Cup ===
21 August 2001 2	Brentford	1–0	Norwich City	Brentford

== Players ==
=== First-team squad ===
Squad at end of season

Note: Flags indicate national team as defined under FIFA eligibility rules; some limited exceptions apply. Players may hold more than one non-FIFA nationality.

No.	Pos.	Nation	Player
1	GK	ENG	Robert Green
2	DF	IRL	Brian McGovern
3	DF	ENG	Adam Drury
4	DF	SCO	Malky Mackay
5	DF	ENG	Craig Fleming
6	FW	DEN	David Nielsen (on loan from Wimbledon)
7	MF	NIR	Phil Mulryne
8	MF	SCO	Gary Holt
9	FW	WAL	Iwan Roberts
10	FW	ENG	Zema Abbey
11	MF	WAL	Chris Llewellyn
12	MF	ENG	Darel Russell
13	GK	ENG	Arran Lee-Barrett
14	FW	SCO	Alex Notman
15	DF	ENG	Darren Kenton

No.	Pos.	Nation	Player
16	DF	DEN	Steen Nedergaard
17	DF	ENG	Daryl Sutch
18	FW	NIR	Paul McVeigh
19	FW	FRA	Marc Libbra
20	FW	SUI	Gaetano Giallanza
22	FW	ENG	Ian Henderson
23	MF	ENG	Neil Emblen
24	MF	ENG	Clint Easton
25	MF	ENG	Lewis Blois
26	FW	ENG	Danny Bloomfield
27	MF	ENG	Mark Rivers
28	GK	ENG	Paul Crichton
29	MF	ENG	Andrew Oxby
30	FW	ENG	Paul Hayes

=== Left club during season ===
Note: Flags indicate national team as defined under FIFA eligibility rules; some limited exceptions apply. Players may hold more than one non-FIFA nationality.

No.	Pos.	Nation	Player
6	DF	ENG	Matt Jackson (to Wigan Athletic)
19	DF	ENG	Adrian Forbes (to Luton Town)
21	FW	NIR	Adrian Coote (Note: Coote was born in Belton with Browston, England, but also qualified to represent Northern Ireland internationally and represented them at U-21 level before making his international debut for Northern Ireland in 1999.) (to Colchester United)

No.	Pos.	Nation	Player
22	FW	SCO	Paul Dalglish (released)
31	FW	ENG	Trevor Benjamin (Note: Benjamin was born in Kettering, England, and represented them at U-21 level, but also qualified to represent Jamaica internationally and would make his international debut for Jamaica in November 2002.) (on loan from Leicester City)

=== Reserve squad ===
Note: Flags indicate national team as defined under FIFA eligibility rules; some limited exceptions apply. Players may hold more than one non-FIFA nationality.

No.	Pos.	Nation	Player
—	DF	ENG	Damian Batt
—	DF	ENG	Jason Shackell
—	MF	ENG	Dean Sinclair

No.	Pos.	Nation	Player
—	FW	ENG	Danny Crow
—	FW	ENG	Ryan Jarvis
