= 2015–16 Essex Senior Football League =

The 2015–16 season was the 45th in the history of Essex Senior Football League, a football competition in England.

The league featured 19 clubs which competed in the league last season, along with two new clubs:

- Burnham Ramblers, relegated from the Isthmian League
- Wadham Lodge, promoted from the Essex Olympian League

Also, Greenhouse London changed their name to Greenhouse Sports. Redbridge were initially relegated from Isthmian League Division One North, however, they were later reprieved by the FA's league committee.

Three clubs have applied for promotion to Step 4: Bowers & Pitsea, FC Romania and Ilford.

Bowers & Pitsea were champions, winning their first as a united club Essex Senior League titleand were promoted to the Isthmian League for the first time in their history.

== League table ==
Essex Senior Football League
- Season: 2015–16
- Champions: Bowers & Pitsea
- Promoted: Bowers & Pitsea
- Matches: 420
- Goals: 1,544 (3.68 per match)
- Top goalscorer: Bradley Warner (39 goals)

Pos	Team	Pld	W	D	L	GF	GA	GD	Pts	Promotion or relegation
1	Bowers & Pitsea	40	31	3	6	118	34	+84	96	Promoted to the Isthmian League
2	Basildon United	40	30	4	6	109	45	+64	94	
3	FC Romania	40	27	8	5	114	43	+71	89	
4	Barking	40	23	10	7	101	50	+51	79	
5	Ilford	40	21	9	10	86	51	+35	71 (Note: Ilford were deducted one point for use of an ineligible player in the match against Barking on 12 March.)	
6	Wadham Lodge	40	19	10	11	85	56	+29	67	
7	Clapton	40	19	10	11	86	67	+19	67	
8	London Bari	40	17	12	11	60	52	+8	63	
9	Stansted	40	18	7	15	76	75	+1	61	
10	Sawbridgeworth Town	40	19	8	13	68	70	−2	61 (Note: Sawbridgeworth Town were deducted one point for use of an ineligible player in the match against Newham on 22 August and three points for use of an ineligible player in the match against Sporting Bengal United on 2 January.)	
11	Hullbridge Sports	40	13	13	14	73	74	−1	52	
12	Sporting Bengal United	40	11	13	16	53	65	−12	46	
13	Eton Manor	40	13	6	21	73	96	−23	45	
14	Burnham Ramblers	40	12	8	20	62	87	−25	44	
15	Greenhouse Sports	40	13	4	23	58	94	−36	43	
16	Southend Manor	40	12	5	23	56	80	−24	41	
17	Tower Hamlets	40	10	6	24	49	90	−41	36	
18	Takeley	40	8	11	21	47	81	−34	35	
19	Waltham Forest	40	9	4	27	60	98	−38	31	
20	Enfield 1893	40	9	4	27	70	125	−55	31	
21	Newham	40	4	9	27	40	111	−71	21	Resigned to the Essex Olympian League

Source: FA Full-Time
Rules for classification: 1) points; 2) goal difference; 3) number of goals scored.
