= 2017–18 Essex Senior Football League =

The 2017–18 season was the 47th in the history of Essex Senior Football League, a football competition in England.

The constitution for Step 5 and Step 6 divisions for 2017–18 was announced on 26 May 2017. The constitution for the Essex Senior League was ratified at the league's AGM on 22 June, although Ilford were expelled for missing deadlines and fines. The club were readmitted to the league on 17 July following an appeal.

The league featured 20 clubs which competed in the league last season, along with one new club:

- Great Wakering Rovers, relegated from the Isthmian League

Also, London Bari merged with Middlesex County League club Hackney Wick and took their name, while Haringey & Waltham changed name to Woodford Town 2017.

Great Wakering Rovers were champions, winning their third Essex Senior League title and returned straight back to the Isthmian League along with FC Romania, who reached this level for the first time in their history and Basilodon United, who returned to the Isthmian League after 27 seasons in the Essex Senior League. Burnham Ramblers and Hackney Wick became the first Essex Senior League to be relegated in the history of the league.

== League table ==
Essex Senior Football League
- Season: 2017–18
- Champions: Great Wakering Rovers
- Promoted: Basildon United; FC Romania; Great Wakering Rovers
- Relegated: Burnham Ramblers; Hackney Wick
- Matches: 420
- Goals: 1,509 (3.59 per match)
- Top goalscorer: Brian Moses (29 goals)
- Highest attendance: 785; Hackney Wick 1–2 Clapton (7 October 2017)

Pos	Team	Pld	W	D	L	GF	GA	GD	Pts	Promotion or relegation
1	Great Wakering Rovers	40	30	4	6	107	29	+78	94	Promoted to the Isthmian League
2	Basildon United	40	29	5	6	83	29	+54	92	Promoted to the Isthmian League
3	FC Romania	40	28	7	5	98	37	+61	91	Promoted to the Isthmian League
4	Redbridge	40	28	4	8	97	56	+41	88	
5	Takeley	40	26	4	10	104	36	+68	82	
6	Clapton	40	19	6	15	64	62	+2	63	
7	West Essex	40	19	5	16	73	73	0	62	
8	Sawbridgeworth Town	40	15	10	15	76	75	+1	55	
9	Enfield 1893	40	15	6	19	64	75	−11	51	
10	Sporting Bengal United	40	15	5	20	69	87	−18	50	
11	Tower Hamlets	40	14	7	19	63	78	−15	49	
12	Woodford Town 2017	40	13	9	18	66	86	−20	48	
13	Ilford	40	14	5	21	53	66	−13	47	
14	Southend Manor	40	12	10	18	65	81	−16	46	
15	Hullbridge Sports	40	12	9	19	69	97	−28	45	
16	Barkingside	40	12	7	21	64	74	−10	43	
17	Waltham Forest	40	11	9	20	62	87	−25	42	
18	Stansted	40	12	4	24	54	70	−16	40	
19	Wadham Lodge	40	10	10	20	66	102	−36	40	
20	Burnham Ramblers	40	10	4	26	64	120	−56	34	Relegated to the Eastern Counties League
21	Hackney Wick	40	10	2	28	48	89	−41	29 (Note: Hackney Wick were deducted three points on 29 March for fielding an ineligible player.)	Relegated to the Eastern Counties League

Source: FA Full-Time
Rules for classification: 1) Points; 2) Goal difference; 3) Number of goals scored; 4) Number of matches won; 5) Head-to-head results
