= 2018–19 Isthmian League =

The 2018–19 season was the 104th season of the Isthmian League, which is an English football competition featuring semi-professional and amateur clubs from London, East and South East England. This was also the first season to consist of four divisions after the league reorganised the former South Division into the new South Central and South East divisions. The league was also known as the Bostik League under a sponsorship deal with Bostik.

== Premier Division ==
Isthmian League Premier Division
- Season: 2018–19
- Champions: Dorking Wanderers
- Promoted: Dorking Wanderers; Tonbridge Angels
- Relegated: Harlow Town; Whitehawk; Burgess Hill Town
- Matches: 462
- Goals: 1,346 (2.91 per match)
- Top goalscorer: 22 goals - Jamie Cureton (Bishop's Stortford)
- Highest attendance: 1853 - Worthing 0–2 Bognor Regis Town
- Total attendance: 179,445
- Average attendance: 388 (+42.1% to previous season)

At the end of the previous season a new step 3 division was created under the Southern Football League, while the number of clubs in the Premier divisions was reduced to 22 for this season. The Premier Division consisted of 22 clubs: 13 clubs from the previous season, and nine new clubs.

- Promoted from the North Division:
  - Hornchurch
  - Haringey Borough
  - Potters Bar Town
- Promoted from the South Division:
  - Carshalton Athletic
  - Corinthian-Casuals
  - Lewes
- Transferred from the Southern League Premier Division:
  - Bishop's Stortford
- Relegated from the National League South:
  - Bognor Regis Town
  - Whitehawk

=== League table ===
Pos	Team	Pld	W	D	L	GF	GA	GD	Pts	Promotion, qualification or relegation
1	Dorking Wanderers	42	28	9	5	87	31	+56	93	Promoted to the National League South
2	Carshalton Athletic	42	21	8	13	70	49	+21	71	Qualified for the play-offs
3	Haringey Borough	42	21	8	13	73	54	+19	71	Qualified for the play-offs
4	Tonbridge Angels	42	21	7	14	59	46	+13	70	Qualified for the play-offs, then promoted to the National League South (Note: Four teams played for one spot in the super play-off final against play-off winners from Southern Football League. Super play-off final winners were to be promoted to the National League North.)
5	Merstham	42	20	10	12	60	50	+10	70	Qualified for the play-offs
6	Folkestone Invicta	42	21	6	15	77	58	+19	69	
7	Bishop's Stortford	42	20	7	15	70	57	+13	67	
8	Leatherhead	42	19	8	15	56	42	+14	65	
9	Worthing	42	18	11	13	72	63	+9	65	
10	Enfield Town	42	17	10	15	76	56	+20	61	
11	Lewes	42	16	12	14	61	53	+8	60	
12	Margate	42	16	11	15	45	48	−3	59	
13	Brightlingsea Regent	42	16	11	15	49	54	−5	59	
14	Bognor Regis Town	42	14	15	13	71	62	+9	56 (Note: Bognor Regis Town were deducted one point for fielding an ineligible player on 2 March.)	
15	Hornchurch	42	12	14	16	57	59	−2	50	
16	Potters Bar Town	42	13	10	19	51	56	−5	49	
17	Corinthian-Casuals	42	13	8	21	48	74	−26	47	
18	Kingstonian	42	13	6	23	60	78	−18	45	
19	Wingate & Finchley	42	12	7	23	57	86	−29	43	
20	Whitehawk	42	10	11	21	50	72	−22	41	Relegated to South East Division
21	Burgess Hill Town	42	9	10	23	44	91	−47	37	Relegated to South East Division
22	Harlow Town	42	9	7	26	53	107	−54	34	Relegated to South Central Division

Source: Isthmian League web site
Rules for classification: 1) Points; 2) Goal difference; 3) Number of goals scored; 4) Number of matches won; 5) Head-to-head results

==== Top scorers ====
Player	Club	Goals
Jamie Cureton	Bishop's Stortford	22
Jason Prior	Dorking Wanderers	21
Billy Bricknell	Enfield Town	19
James Muitt	Bognor Regis Town	18
Elliott Buchanan	Kingstonian; Dorking Wanderers	17
David Ajiboye	Worthing	16
Walter Figueira	Merstham	16
Joel Nouble	Haringey Borough	16
Adeoye Yusuff	Folkestone Invicta	16

==== Play-offs ====
Semi-finals
2	Carshalton Athletic	1
5	Merstham	2
3	Haringey Borough	1
4	Tonbridge Angels	2

Final
5	Merstham	0
4	Tonbridge Angels	2

Super final
4	Tonbridge Angels (a.e.t.)	3
SFL DS	Metropolitan Police	2

==== Semi-finals ====
2 May	Carshalton Athletic	1–2	Merstham	Carshalton
	Adeniyi 17'		Figueira 2'; Samuels 79'	Stadium: War Memorial Sports Ground; Attendance: 1,151

2 May	Haringey Borough	1–2	Tonbridge Angels	Tottenham
	Oyenuga 56' (pen.)		Ramadan 34'; McKenzie 43'	Stadium: Coles Park; Attendance: 810

==== Final ====
6 May	Tonbridge Angels	2–0	Merstham	Tonbridge
	McKenzie 34'; Turner 90' (pen.)			Stadium: Longmead Stadium; Attendance: 2,268

==== Super final ====
11 May	Metropolitan Police	2–3 (a.e.t.)	Tonbridge Angels	East Molesey
	Chislett 18'; Robinson 56'		Lee 52'; Theobalds 86'; Derry 97'	Stadium: Imber Court; Attendance: 1,260

=== Results table ===
Home \ Away	HOR	BIS	BOG	BRI	BUR	CAR	COR	DOW	ENF	FOL	HAR	HAT	KIN	LEA	LEW	MAR	MER	POT	TON	WHI	W&F	WOR
Hornchurch		0–1	1–1	1–2	2–0	1–1	3–0	1–1	2–0	4–1	2–2	3–0	2–2	3–0	1–5	1–2	1–1	0–1	0–2	1–2	3–0	1–1
Bishop's Stortford	1–0		0–0	3–2	2–2	3–1	3–0	1–1	2–1	0–1	2–0	1–0	0–3	1–1	1–2	2–1	2–0	1–2	3–4	4–2	3–2	3–0
Bognor Regis Town	2–0	3–0		1–2	8–0	2–0	0–1	0–1	1–2	2–4	0–4	1–1	3–1	0–4	2–2	0–0	3–1	2–2	2–3	0–0	4–2	2–2
Brightlingsea Regent	1–1	1–0	3–0		3–2	0–2	4–3	0–2	1–0	2–0	0–2	1–1	2–0	1–0	0–0	0–3	1–1	0–1	0–2	3–0	0–1	0–2
Burgess Hill Town	0–3	0–3	0–2	1–1		3–2	2–1	0–0	1–6	0–0	3–1	1–3	0–1	0–3	1–1	0–2	3–0	0–1	0–4	2–4	0–1	2–1
Carshalton Athletic	2–1	2–1	1–1	3–0	2–0		2–3	0–0	1–0	4–2	3–1	2–0	1–1	2–1	2–1	1–2	1–2	1–0	3–0	2–0	5–1	1–2
Corinthian-Casuals	1–0	1–1	1–3	1–1	3–0	1–0		0–0	1–6	1–3	3–1	0–0	1–2	2–1	0–2	0–3	1–1	1–2	2–1	2–0	3–1	1–1
Dorking Wanderers	3–3	1–0	2–0	2–1	6–0	2–3	2–0		1–0	6–0	2–0	5–3	7–1	2–0	1–2	2–0	2–2	4–1	0–1	2–1	3–0	3–0
Enfield Town	2–2	2–1	3–3	0–0	3–1	0–3	0–2	1–1		2–0	2–2	4–1	0–1	0–1	1–1	4–0	0–0	3–1	0–0	6–0	4–1	1–4
Folkestone Invicta	5–0	2–0	1–0	2–3	1–1	2–3	2–1	0–1	2–3		4–0	3–2	2–0	2–0	4–0	1–0	6–2	2–0	0–1	2–1	2–2	0–1
Haringey Borough	3–1	3–1	2–2	2–1	4–4	3–1	2–2	3–2	3–1	1–0		0–2	2–0	0–3	2–1	1–0	2–2	1–0	4–0	3–0	1–2	1–2
Harlow Town	2–4	1–3	1–1	0–1	1–1	0–4	1–2	0–1	1–3	2–4	2–1		3–1	2–2	2–1	3–4	1–4	2–5	1–0	0–3	2–7	0–2
Kingstonian	2–3	3–2	4–1	2–3	2–3	1–1	1–0	0–1	2–1	4–1	0–4	7–0		0–4	2–1	2–1	0–0	1–2	1–1	1–3	1–2	2–3
Leatherhead	1–2	1–0	2–2	0–1	3–0	1–0	1–2	0–3	4–1	0–0	2–1	1–3	2–1		1–1	0–1	0–1	2–1	1–0	1–1	2–1	2–1
Lewes	0–0	1–3	3–3	5–0	0–3	0–1	3–0	0–2	2–2	2–0	0–1	2–1	3–0	1–0		0–0	2–1	0–0	0–0	1–3	4–2	3–4
Margate	0–0	1–4	1–0	1–0	2–3	1–1	5–2	0–1	2–1	0–3	0–1	0–0	1–0	1–1	0–1		1–0	0–2	0–2	1–3	2–2	1–1
Merstham	3–0	1–1	1–2	1–0	0–2	2–0	2–1	4–1	1–0	1–3	0–0	5–1	2–0	0–2	3–2	1–1		3–1	0–3	1–0	3–0	1–0
Potters Bar Town	0–1	4–2	2–2	0–2	0–0	0–1	2–2	0–2	1–2	2–2	0–0	1–2	3–0	0–1	1–0	1–2	0–1		2–1	1–1	4–0	1–1
Tonbridge Angels	1–0	2–3	1–2	2–2	1–0	1–0	2–0	0–2	1–2	1–3	1–0	3–1	3–2	0–2	0–0	1–1	0–1	2–1		2–0	2–1	1–2
Whitehawk	1–1	0–2	1–4	1–1	4–1	2–2	4–0	1–1	1–3	0–0	1–3	4–2	1–1	0–2	0–1	0–0	0–1	1–0	0–4		2–3	1–2
Wingate & Finchley	1–1	2–2	0–2	2–2	4–2	2–0	2–0	1–2	1–1	0–3	0–4	0–2	0–4	1–0	0–1	0–1	2–0	4–2	1–2	1–1		1–2
Worthing	3–1	1–2	0–2	1–1	0–0	3–3	2–0	1–4	0–3	3–2	0–2	9–1	3–1	1–1	3–4	0–1	2–4	1–1	1–1	2–0	2–1	

Updated to match(es) played on unknown. Source:
Legend: Blue = home team win; Yellow = draw; Red = away team win.

=== Stadia and locations ===
Locations of the Premier Division clubs
Greater London Premier Division football clubs

Club	Stadium	Capacity
AFC Hornchurch	Hornchurch Stadium	3,500
Bishop's Stortford	Woodside Park	4,525
Bognor Regis Town	Nyewood Lane	4,500
Brightlingsea Regent	North Road	2,000
Burgess Hill Town	Leylands Park	2,500
Carshalton Athletic	War Memorial Sports Ground	5,000
Corinthian-Casuals	King George's Field	2,700
Dorking Wanderers	Meadowbank Stadium	2,000
Enfield Town	Queen Elizabeth II Stadium	2,500
Folkestone Invicta	Cheriton Road	4,000
Haringey Borough	Coles Park	2,500
Harlow Town	The Harlow Arena	3,500
Kingstonian	King George's Field (groundshare with Corinthian-Casuals )	2,700
Leatherhead	Fetcham Grove	3,400
Lewes	The Dripping Pan	3,000
Margate	Hartsdown Park	3,000
Merstham	Moatside	2,000
Potters Bar Town	Parkfield	2,000
Tonbridge Angels	Longmead Stadium	3,000
Whitehawk	The Enclosed Ground	3,126
Wingate & Finchley	The Harry Abrahams Stadium	3,000
Worthing	Woodside Road	4,000

== North Division ==
Isthmian League North Division
- Season: 2018–19
- Champions: Bowers & Pitsea
- Promoted: Bowers & Pitsea
- Relegated: Mildenhall Town
- Matches: 380
- Goals: 1,254 (3.3 per match)
- Top goalscorer: 36 goals - David Knight (Bowers & Pitsea)
- Total attendance: 74,670
- Average attendance: 197 (+25.5% to previous season)

North Division consisted of 20 clubs: 16 clubs from the previous season, and four new clubs:

- Promoted from the Eastern Counties League:
  - Coggeshall Town
  - Felixstowe & Walton United
- Promoted from the Essex Senior League:
  - Basildon United
  - Great Wakering Rovers

=== League table ===
Pos	Team	Pld	W	D	L	GF	GA	GD	Pts	Promotion, qualification or relegation
1	Bowers & Pitsea	38	29	5	4	96	25	+71	92	Promoted to the Premier Division
2	Aveley	38	24	8	6	84	49	+35	80	Qualified for the play-offs (Note: Four teams played for one spot and possible promotion to Level 7. Five of seven level 8 play-off winners highest by points were to be promoted.)
3	Maldon & Tiptree	38	24	7	7	86	46	+40	79	Qualified for the play-offs
4	Coggeshall Town	38	22	8	8	79	43	+36	74	Qualified for the play-offs
5	Heybridge Swifts	38	23	5	10	70	51	+19	74	Qualified for the play-offs
6	Bury Town	38	17	8	13	72	63	+9	59	
7	Grays Athletic	38	14	11	13	65	64	+1	53	
8	AFC Sudbury	38	16	4	18	71	72	−1	52	
9	Canvey Island	38	15	6	17	51	50	+1	51	
10	Tilbury	38	13	11	14	64	64	0	50	
11	Felixstowe & Walton United	38	14	8	16	56	66	−10	50	
12	Barking	38	13	8	17	49	63	−14	47	Transferred to South Central Division
13	Brentwood Town	38	12	9	17	71	77	−6	45	
14	Dereham Town	38	14	5	19	71	82	−11	44 (Note: Dereham Town were deducted three points for fielding an ineligible player in two games.)	
15	Great Wakering Rovers	38	11	8	19	55	72	−17	41	
16	Soham Town Rangers	38	12	4	22	44	64	−20	40	
17	Basildon United	38	11	6	21	37	71	−34	39	
18	Witham Town	38	9	7	22	38	68	−30	34	
19	Romford	38	10	4	24	48	82	−34	34 (Note: North Ferriby United from Step 3 folded during the season. Because of this Romford were reprieved from relegation.)	
20	Mildenhall Town	38	5	12	21	47	82	−35	27	Relegated to the Eastern Counties League

Source: Isthmian League web site
Rules for classification: 1) Points; 2) Goal difference; 3) Number of goals scored; 4) Number of matches won; 5) Head-to-head results

==== Top scorers ====
Player	Club	Goals
David Knight	Bowers & Pitsea	36
Samuel Bantick	Heybridge Swifts	25
Lewis Smith	Tilbury	24
Nnamdi Nwachuku	Coggeshall Town	22
Samuel Mulready	Soham Town Rangers	21

==== Play-offs ====
Semi-finals
2	Aveley	0
5	Heybridge Swifts	2
3	Maldon & Tiptree	1
4	Coggeshall Town	0

Final
3	Maldon & Tiptree	2 (0)
5	Heybridge Swifts	2 (2)

==== Semi-finals ====
1 May	Aveley	0–2	Heybridge Swifts	Aveley
			Walker 16'; Price 91'	Stadium: Parkside; Attendance: 573

1 May	Maldon & Tiptree	1–0	Coggeshall Town	Maldon
	Dsane 59'			Stadium: Wallace Binder Ground; Attendance: 494

==== Final ====
5 May	Maldon & Tiptree	2–2 (0–2 p)	Heybridge Swifts	Maldon
	Awotwi 90'; Dsane 90'		Brown 48'; Kouassi 82'	Stadium: Wallace Binder Ground; Attendance: 945

=== Results table ===
Home \ Away	SUD	AVE	BAR	BAS	BOW	BRE	BUR	CAN	COG	DER	FEL	GRA	GWR	HEY	M&T	MIL	ROM	STR	TIL	WIT
A.F.C. Sudbury		0–2	1–1	0–0	0–1	5–3	3–4	3–0	0–1	8–2	4–2	2–3	2–1	0–1	1–5	3–1	1–3	0–3	4–3	3–1
Aveley	6–0		1–1	2–1	0–1	5–3	2–2	2–0	1–1	6–0	3–2	3–1	2–2	3–2	1–3	3–0	2–0	4–0	1–3	3–1
Barking	2–1	0–2		5–1	0–1	3–0	0–2	1–3	0–3	1–0	2–4	2–1	2–0	4–1	1–2	1–1	3–0	2–1	0–1	2–3
Basildon United	0–4	0–0	0–1		0–4	2–1	0–0	1–4	0–1	0–4	0–1	1–0	1–0	2–1	1–2	2–1	3–1	1–0	0–3	0–2
Bowers & Pitsea	3–0	3–3	9–0	4–0		6–0	2–2	2–0	3–2	4–0	4–0	1–0	4–1	1–3	0–0	3–0	2–0	3–1	3–1	3–0
Brentwood Town	5–2	4–4	1–0	1–1	3–0		1–1	1–3	1–1	1–2	3–1	0–1	3–2	1–3	0–1	2–2	2–0	4–1	2–2	3–1
Bury Town	2–3	1–2	2–1	4–2	1–5	2–1		1–1	2–3	3–3	2–0	4–2	3–2	1–2	1–4	3–0	1–1	1–0	3–0	5–2
Canvey Island	0–2	1–2	1–0	4–0	1–2	2–2	2–0		0–2	1–4	0–1	2–0	0–1	1–2	2–2	2–1	2–0	0–1	1–1	0–1
Coggeshall Town	0–1	1–2	1–0	3–0	0–0	2–3	2–1	3–3		0–0	2–1	4–0	3–0	0–1	2–3	3–0	3–1	3–0	1–1	2–0
Dereham Town	3–0	1–1	5–2	0–3	1–3	1–2	3–2	0–1	4–2		0–1	2–2	6–1	1–3	2–3	5–2	1–0	0–1	2–3	2–0
Felixstowe & Walton United	0–1	2–0	1–1	1–0	0–4	3–0	3–1	0–4	3–0	2–2		1–2	1–0	3–0	3–2	0–3	2–1	1–3	1–1	2–2
Grays Athletic	3–2	3–4	2–2	2–2	1–1	3–1	3–2	1–1	0–1	5–1	2–2		4–3	0–1	0–5	1–1	1–1	4–0	3–2	0–1
Great Wakering Rovers	1–1	2–3	0–3	4–1	1–0	1–1	1–2	2–1	2–2	2–1	2–0	2–2		3–2	2–4	1–1	2–1	1–1	2–3	2–1
Heybridge Swifts	2–0	1–2	2–0	3–2	1–0	3–1	2–0	2–1	2–3	0–3	4–2	2–1	0–0		1–1	1–1	3–1	2–0	2–1	1–0
Maldon & Tiptree	0–4	0–1	7–1	1–0	1–2	1–0	3–0	1–2	1–4	3–0	2–1	2–2	3–1	3–2		5–1	4–1	1–0	0–0	0–1
Mildenhall Town	3–3	1–2	1–2	0–1	1–2	0–6	0–0	2–3	2–4	3–0	3–3	0–3	0–3	3–4	1–1		2–1	1–1	2–2	2–0
Romford	3–1	2–0	0–0	0–0	1–4	1–4	0–4	0–1	3–5	3–4	3–1	1–0	3–0	1–5	2–4	2–1		5–2	2–1	3–1
Soham Town Rangers	0–2	0–1	1–2	1–2	0–1	3–3	0–3	1–0	0–3	2–1	0–2	1–2	3–1	3–1	0–2	1–3	4–0		2–2	3–0
Tilbury	0–4	3–0	0–0	1–2	0–3	4–1	1–2	3–0	1–5	4–2	2–2	1–1	0–3	1–1	2–3	2–0	4–1	0–3		3–0
Witham Town	2–0	1–3	1–1	3–5	0–2	2–1	1–2	0–1	1–1	2–3	1–1	0–2	2–1	1–1	1–1	1–1	2–0	0–1	0–2	

Updated to match(es) played on unknown. Source:
Legend: Blue = home team win; Yellow = draw; Red = away team win.

=== Stadia and locations ===
Locations of North Division clubs
Greater London Premier Division football clubs

Club	Stadium	Capacity
AFC Sudbury	King's Marsh	2,500
Aveley	Parkside	3,500
Barking	Mayesbrook Park	2,500
Basildon United	Gardiners Close	2,000
Bowers & Pitsea	Len Salmon Stadium	2,000
Brentwood Town	The Brentwood Centre Arena	1,800
Bury Town	Ram Meadow	3,500
Canvey Island	Park Lane	4,500
Coggeshall Town	West Street	2,000
Dereham Town	Aldiss Park	3,000
Felixstowe & Walton United	Dellwood Avenue	2,000
Grays Athletic	Parkside (groundshare with Aveley)	3,500
Great Wakering Rovers	Burroughs Park	2,500
Heybridge Swifts	Scraley Road	3,000
Maldon & Tiptree	Wallace Binder Ground	2,000
Mildenhall Town	Recreation Way	2,000
Romford	Rookery Hill (groundshare with East Thurrock United)	3,500
Soham Town Rangers	Julius Martin Lane	2,000
Tilbury	Chadfields	4,000
Witham Town	Spa Road	2,500

== South Central Division ==
Isthmian League South Central Division
- Season: 2018–19
- Champions: Hayes & Yeading United
- Promoted: Hayes & Yeading United; Cheshunt
- Relegated: Egham Town; Molesey
- Matches: 380
- Goals: 1,307 (3.44 per match)
- Top goalscorer: 31 goal - Liam Ferdinand (Bracknell Town)
- Total attendance: 46,569
- Average attendance: 123

At the end of the previous season a seventh step 4 division was created under the Isthmian League, as the South Division clubs were distributed between new South East and South Central divisions. The number of clubs in the step 4 divisions was reduced to 20 for the next season. The following teams were allocated to the South Central Division.

- Remained from the South Division:
  - Chipstead
  - Molesey
  - South Park
- Transferred from the North Division:
  - Cheshunt
  - Hertford Town
  - Waltham Abbey
  - Ware
- Promoted from the Combined Counties League:
  - Bedfont Sports
  - Westfield
- Transferred from the Southern League Division One East:
  - Ashford Town
  - Chalfont St Peter
  - Egham Town
  - Hanwell Town
  - Hayes & Yeading United
  - Marlow
  - Northwood
  - Uxbridge
- Plus:
  - Bracknell Town, promoted from the Hellenic League
  - FC Romania, promoted from the Essex Senior League
  - Tooting & Mitcham United, relegated from the Premier Division

=== League table ===
Pos	Team	Pld	W	D	L	GF	GA	GD	Pts	Promotion, qualification or relegation
1	Hayes & Yeading United	38	29	6	3	129	36	+93	93	Promoted to the SL Premier Division South
2	Bracknell Town	38	23	8	7	102	49	+53	77	Qualified for the play-offs
3	Cheshunt	38	22	10	6	79	43	+36	76	Qualified for the play-offs, then promoted to the Premier Division (Note: Four teams played for one spot and possible promotion to Level 7. Five of seven level 8 play-off winners highest by points were to be promoted.)
4	Marlow	38	21	10	7	66	37	+29	73	Qualified for the play-offs
5	Westfield	38	21	7	10	77	54	+23	70	Qualified for the play-offs
6	Tooting & Mitcham United	38	18	11	9	66	52	+14	65	
7	Ware	38	18	9	11	90	59	+31	63	
8	Hanwell Town	38	16	12	10	71	65	+6	60	
9	Waltham Abbey	38	18	2	18	63	68	−5	56	
10	Northwood	38	16	6	16	65	71	−6	54	
11	Ashford Town	38	15	5	18	55	70	−15	50	
12	Bedfont Sports	38	13	9	16	75	76	−1	48	
13	Chipstead	38	13	6	19	54	63	−9	45	
14	Chalfont St Peter	38	10	13	15	52	60	−8	43	
15	Uxbridge	38	11	9	18	50	71	−21	42	
16	FC Romania	38	11	3	24	46	86	−40	36	
17	South Park	38	9	6	23	47	92	−45	33	
18	Hertford Town	38	6	13	19	55	85	−30	31	
19	Molesey	38	7	7	24	36	76	−40	28	Relegated to the Combined Counties League
20	Egham Town	38	4	6	28	29	94	−65	18	Relegated to the Combined Counties League

Source: Isthmian League Website
Rules for classification: 1) Points; 2) Goal difference; 3) Number of goals scored; 4) Number of matches won; 5) Head-to-head results

==== Top scorers ====
Player	Club	Goals
Liam Ferdinand	Bracknell Town	31
Lee Barney	Hayes & Yeading United	24
Brandon Adams	Ware	23
David Cowley	Ware	22

==== Play-offs ====
Semi-finals
2	Bracknell Town	2
5	Westfield	1
3	Cheshunt	2
4	Marlow	1

Final
2	Bracknell Town	0
3	Cheshunt	3

==== Semi-finals ====
30 April	Bracknell Town	2–1	Westfield	Bracknell
	Ferdinand 32'; Cornell 39'		Purdy 79'	Stadium: Larges Lane; Attendance: 564

30 April	Cheshunt	2–1	Marlow	Cheshunt
	Hallett 62'; Moses 68'		English 26'	Stadium: Cheshunt Stadium; Attendance: 271

==== Final ====
4 May	Bracknell Town	0–3	Cheshunt	Bracknell
			Cojocarel 45', 48'; Moses 53'	Stadium: Larges Lane; Attendance: 837

=== Results table ===
Home \ Away	ASH	BED	BRA	CHA	CHE	CHI	EGH	HAN	HAY	HER	MAR	MOL	NOR	ROM	SOU	TOO	UXB	WAL	WAR	WES
Ashford Town		2–1	0–5	2–0	1–1	0–0	2–1	1–4	2–2	1–1	0–3	2–3	2–1	2–1	1–2	1–2	0–1	2–1	1–3	3–0
Bedfont Sports	4–0		1–1	2–3	2–2	1–0	4–1	3–3	2–6	3–3	0–1	1–1	3–0	1–2	4–0	0–1	5–1	4–1	3–2	3–0
Bracknell Town	6–0	1–1		2–0	1–1	1–0	7–1	2–2	3–3	2–0	3–3	4–0	2–1	6–0	4–3	3–1	4–0	1–0	3–2	3–1
Chalfont St Peter	2–1	3–0	2–2		0–2	0–2	3–0	2–2	1–5	1–1	4–1	1–1	1–2	1–0	1–2	0–2	1–1	4–3	0–1	2–2
Cheshunt	1–0	2–2	2–0	1–1		3–3	3–0	4–2	3–3	2–2	0–0	2–0	3–0	2–3	3–1	3–0	1–1	2–1	4–0	3–0
Chipstead	2–4	3–4	0–3	3–2	0–1		5–0	0–1	1–2	0–0	1–0	0–0	2–3	2–1	1–4	1–3	3–2	2–0	1–3	0–3
Egham Town	1–2	1–1	2–1	1–1	2–1	1–4		0–2	1–1	1–1	0–0	0–2	1–3	0–2	0–3	3–4	2–2	0–1	0–3	2–1
Hanwell Town	1–0	3–1	2–1	2–1	3–1	0–0	3–1		1–9	0–0	0–6	3–1	3–1	6–2	4–0	1–2	2–4	2–3	3–0	1–4
Hayes & Yeading United	7–1	6–0	1–0	4–0	1–0	1–0	4–0	1–1		8–1	0–2	2–0	6–0	5–1	5–2	3–0	5–0	4–2	1–0	5–1
Hertford Town	0–1	5–4	1–3	2–1	1–5	5–2	3–1	2–2	0–3		2–2	1–4	3–4	0–2	4–1	1–2	2–2	1–2	0–3	1–3
Marlow	1–0	1–0	0–1	0–0	4–0	4–0	2–0	4–1	2–1	1–1		3–0	3–0	2–0	1–1	1–1	1–0	1–3	0–4	0–1
Molesey	0–2	2–2	1–2	1–0	0–1	0–1	2–0	0–0	2–3	1–0	3–4		0–1	2–2	1–2	2–3	0–5	2–0	0–3	0–4
Northwood	3–0	3–2	0–3	0–1	1–2	2–0	0–2	2–2	1–2	1–1	1–2	6–1		4–1	2–2	4–3	1–1	0–2	2–2	1–3
F.C. Romania	0–2	4–2	1–6	1–2	0–2	0–5	3–1	1–0	0–2	2–0	0–2	2–0	1–3		3–0	1–4	2–2	1–2	0–6	0–1
South Park	2–5	0–1	0–3	0–5	1–4	0–1	2–0	0–3	1–6	3–2	1–2	3–1	1–4	1–1		1–1	0–1	1–2	1–6	0–3
Tooting & Mitcham United	2–3	1–2	2–2	1–1	1–2	3–1	3–0	0–0	1–3	3–1	0–0	2–0	1–1	2–1	1–1		4–2	2–1	1–1	1–1
Uxbridge	0–5	2–3	3–2	0–0	0–2	1–2	3–1	0–1	2–2	0–2	1–2	1–0	4–1	2–0	1–0	0–1		0–2	2–1	2–2
Waltham Abbey	2–1	2–1	1–5	2–2	5–3	0–3	2–1	3–2	1–0	3–2	3–3	3–0	0–1	1–2	2–3	0–2	3–0		1–2	0–3
Ware	2–2	4–2	7–2	4–1	0–1	3–3	3–1	2–2	1–3	1–1	3–0	2–2	2–3	3–2	2–1	2–2	2–1	2–3		1–1
Westfield	2–1	3–0	4–2	2–2	1–4	2–0	5–0	1–1	0–4	5–2	1–2	3–1	1–2	2–1	1–1	2–1	4–0	1–0	3–2	

Updated to match(es) played on 30 March 2019. Source:
Legend: Blue = home team win; Yellow = draw; Red = away team win.

=== Stadia and locations ===
Locations of South Central clubs
Greater London South Central Division clubs

Clubs	Stadium	Capacity
Ashford Town	Robert Parker Stadium	2,550
Bedfont Sports	Bedfont Recreation Ground	3,000
Bracknell Town	Larges Lane	2,500
Chalfont St Peter	Mill Meadow	1,500
Cheshunt	Cheshunt Stadium	3,000
Chipstead	High Road	2,000
Egham Town	The Runnymede Stadium	5,565
FC Romania	Cheshunt Stadium (groundshare with Cheshunt)	3,000
Hanwell Town	Reynolds Field	3,000
Hayes & Yeading United	Beaconsfield Road	3,000
Hertford Town	Hertingfordbury Park	6,500
Marlow	Alfred Davis Memorial Ground	3,000
Molesey	Walton Road Stadium	4,000
Northwood	Northwood Park	3,075
South Park	King George's Field	2,000
Tooting & Mitcham United	Imperial Fields	3,500
Uxbridge	Honeycroft	3,770
Waltham Abbey	Capershotts	3,500
Ware	Wodson Park	3,300
Westfield	Woking Park	1,000

== South East Division ==
Isthmian League South East Division
- Season: 2018–19
- Champions: Cray Wanderers
- Promoted: Cray Wanderers; Horsham
- Relegated: Greenwich Borough
- Matches: 342
- Goals: 1,147 (3.35 per match)
- Top goalscorer: 32 goals - Charlie MacDonald (VCD Athletic)
- Total attendance: 70,776
- Average attendance: 207 (+2.9% to previous season)

At the end of the previous season a seventh step 4 division was created under the Isthmian League, as the South Division clubs were distributed between new South East and South Central divisions. The number of clubs in the step 4 divisions was reduced to 20 for the next season. South East Division consisted of 20 clubs: 16 clubs from the previous season South Division, and four new clubs:

- Promoted from the Southern Combination League:
  - Haywards Heath Town
  - Three Bridges
- Promoted from the Southern Counties East League:
  - Sevenoaks Town
  - Whitstable Town

=== League table ===
Pos	Team	Pld	W	D	L	GF	GA	GD	Pts	Promotion, qualification or relegation
1	Cray Wanderers	36	25	7	4	79	35	+44	82	Promoted to the Premier Division
2	Horsham	36	23	5	8	73	38	+35	74	Qualified for the play-offs, then promoted to the Premier Division (Note: Four teams played for one spot and possible promotion to Level 7. Five of seven level 8 play-off winners highest by points were to be promoted.)
3	Hastings United	36	21	7	8	78	45	+33	70	Qualified for the play-offs
4	Ashford United	36	21	5	10	74	36	+38	68	Qualified for the play-offs
5	Haywards Heath Town	36	18	9	9	65	52	+13	63	Qualified for the play-offs
6	VCD Athletic	36	20	2	14	74	66	+8	62	
7	Hythe Town	36	14	10	12	66	59	+7	52	
8	Whyteleafe	36	14	7	15	59	51	+8	49	
9	Phoenix Sports	36	13	10	13	65	65	0	49	
10	Sevenoaks Town	36	13	8	15	49	54	−5	47	
11	Ramsgate	36	11	12	13	54	53	+1	45	
12	Whitstable Town	36	11	10	15	36	55	−19	43	
13	East Grinstead Town	36	11	8	17	65	72	−7	41	
14	Three Bridges	36	12	5	19	51	69	−18	41	
15	Herne Bay	36	11	5	20	65	85	−20	38	
16	Sittingbourne	36	11	4	21	49	72	−23	37	
17	Faversham Town	36	10	7	19	55	85	−30	37	
18	Guernsey	36	7	9	20	50	77	−27	30	
19	Greenwich Borough	36	8	6	22	40	78	−38	27 (Note: Greenwich Borough were deducted three points for fielding an ineligible player in their win over Hythe Town on 16 February.)	Relegated to the Southern Counties East League
20	Thamesmead Town	0	0	0	0	0	0	0	0 (Note: Thamesmead Town folded in October 2018 the club's playing record of Pl7 W2 D0 L5 GF12 GA16 ₧6 was expunged.)	Resigned

Source: Isthmian League website
Rules for classification: 1) Points; 2) Goal difference; 3) Number of goals scored; 4) Number of matches won; 5) Head-to-head results

==== Top scorers ====
Player	Club	Goals
Charlie MacDonald	VCD Athletic	32
Zak Ansah	Hythe Town	26
Daniel Parish	Thamesmead Town	24
Daniel Ajakaiye	Hastings United	23
Jeff Duah-Kessie	Phoenix Sports	22

==== Play-offs ====
Semi-finals
2	Horsham	3
5	Haywards Heath Town	0
3	Hastings United	2
4	Ashford United (a.e.t.)	3

Final
2	Horsham (a.e.t.)	2
4	Ashford United	1

==== Semi-finals ====
29 April	Horsham	3–0	Haywards Heath Town	Horsham
	Harding 23'; O'Toole 64'; Richardson-Brown 90'			Stadium: Culver Road; Attendance: 547

29 April	Hastings United	2–3 (a.e.t.)	Ashford United	Hastings
	Rodari 47'; Dixon 63'		May 50'; Corne 66', 119' (pen.)	Stadium: The Pilot Field; Attendance: 1,123

==== Final ====
3 May	Horsham	2–1 (a.e.t.)	Ashford United	Horsham
	Hayward 39'; Merchant-Simmonds 110'		Corne 45' (pen.)	Stadium: Culver Road; Attendance: 880

=== Results table ===
Home \ Away	ASH	CRA	EAS	FAV	GRE	GUE	HAS	HAY	HER	HOR	HYT	PHO	RAM	SEV	SIT	THR	VCD	WHT	WHY
Ashford United		1–3	1–0	2–0	7–0	3–0	0–2	5–0	4–1	2–3	3–1	0–2	3–0	2–1	1–1	2–4	3–1	2–0	0–0
Cray Wanderers	3–1		2–0	7–2	1–1	3–0	2–1	2–2	6–0	2–0	4–3	1–1	0–0	3–4	2–1	1–0	3–1	2–0	1–1
East Grinstead Town	1–2	0–2		1–2	1–3	3–0	2–1	3–3	1–1	0–0	5–2	1–3	1–0	1–1	2–1	4–4	3–1	4–0	1–3
Faversham Town	0–4	1–1	1–1		4–1	2–1	2–2	2–4	1–1	0–2	2–1	0–0	1–3	3–1	3–1	3–0	3–4	1–2	1–0
Greenwich Borough	0–3	0–3	2–0	4–1		4–0	1–3	1–4	2–7	0–2	2–0	0–1	1–2	0–1	2–1	2–2	1–2	0–0	0–0
Guernsey	0–3	1–2	2–5	2–2	1–1		0–1	3–1	2–1	1–2	0–2	3–5	2–1	1–2	1–2	0–3	3–4	1–1	1–3
Hastings United	2–2	3–2	2–3	2–1	4–0	1–1		2–4	5–0	2–0	1–1	3–0	3–0	1–0	5–0	2–1	2–1	3–1	3–0
Haywards Heath Town	1–1	0–1	3–1	2–0	0–0	1–2	2–1		2–1	2–0	0–1	2–2	2–3	0–1	2–0	2–0	0–1	2–1	3–1
Herne Bay	2–1	1–2	2–5	3–1	1–2	2–2	4–1	0–1		2–3	3–1	2–4	1–5	1–2	1–1	0–3	1–7	3–1	0–1
Horsham	0–0	4–2	3–1	4–0	2–0	1–1	1–1	4–5	1–0		2–1	3–2	1–0	3–1	1–2	2–0	4–0	4–0	1–0
Hythe Town	3–1	1–3	3–0	5–4	1–2	1–1	3–1	0–0	2–2	2–4		5–1	2–2	0–0	3–2	1–0	3–0	2–0	1–0
Phoenix Sports	1–2	0–1	5–1	2–2	3–2	3–2	3–3	2–4	5–2	1–0	3–3		1–1	1–0	3–4	5–2	0–2	0–2	2–2
Ramsgate	1–3	2–2	3–2	1–0	3–1	2–2	2–3	0–0	4–5	0–0	1–1	0–0		1–3	4–0	1–1	1–2	4–1	2–1
Sevenoaks Town	1–0	0–1	3–3	4–1	2–1	0–2	2–3	2–2	2–1	1–2	2–0	1–2	1–1		0–1	0–0	1–3	1–1	1–3
Sittingbourne	0–2	0–2	2–1	3–1	4–2	2–2	0–3	1–2	2–3	1–6	0–3	1–1	0–1	4–1		0–1	1–2	1–2	2–1
Three Bridges	0–1	0–2	0–2	2–4	2–0	0–5	1–3	3–4	1–5	2–1	2–3	2–0	3–1	2–0	0–5		1–2	2–1	3–2
VCD Athletic	0–4	1–2	5–4	5–2	4–1	2–3	0–2	3–0	2–0	1–3	2–2	2–0	2–1	1–3	1–2	2–1		3–1	0–0
Whitstable Town	1–0	1–0	1–1	1–2	2–0	3–1	1–1	0–0	0–4	0–3	0–0	2–1	1–0	1–1	2–1	1–1	4–1		0–2
Whyteleafe	1–3	1–3	3–1	6–0	4–1	3–1	2–0	2–3	0–2	3–1	4–3	2–0	1–1	2–3	3–0	0–2	1–4	1–1	

Legend: Blue = home team win; Yellow = draw; Red = away team win.

=== Stadia and locations ===
Locations of South East Division clubs
Greater London Premier Division football clubs

Club	Stadium	Capacity
Ashford United	The Homelands	3,200
Cray Wanderers	Hayes Lane (groundshare with Bromley)	6,000
East Grinstead Town	East Court	1,500
Faversham Town	Salters Lane	2,000
Greenwich Borough	Badgers Sports Ground (groundshare with Cray Valley PM)	1,500
Guernsey	Footes Lane	5,000
Hastings United	The Pilot Field	4,050
Haywards Heath Town	Hanbury Park	2,000
Herne Bay	Winch's Field	4,000
Horsham	Culver Road (groundshare with Lancing FC)	1,500
Hythe Town	Reachfields Stadium	3,000
Phoenix Sports	Victory Road	2,000
Ramsgate	Southwood Stadium	2,500
Sevenoaks Town	Greatness Park	1,000
Sittingbourne	Woodstock Park	3,000
Thamesmead Town	Princes Park (groundshare with Dartford)	4,100
Three Bridges	Jubilee Field	1,500
VCD Athletic	Oakwood	1,400
Whitstable Town	The Belmont Ground	3,000
Whyteleafe	Church Road	2,000

== Step 4 play-off winners rating ==
Club	League	PPG	GD	Qualification
Bromsgrove Sporting	Southern Football League Division One Central	2.29	64	Promoted to Step 3
Horsham	Isthmian League South East Division	2.06	35	Promoted to Step 3
Cheshunt	Isthmian League South Central Division	2	36	Promoted to Step 3
Radcliffe	Northern Premier League Division One West	1.97	39	Promoted to Step 3
Yate Town	Southern Football League Division One South	1.97	23	Promoted to Step 3
Heybridge Swifts	Isthmian League North Division	1.95	19	Retained at Step 4
Brighouse Town	Northern Premier League Division One East	1.87	31	Retained at Step 4

== League Cup ==
2018–19 Alan Turvey Trophy
Tournament details
- Country: England
- Teams: 77

Final positions
- Champions: Enfield Town
- Runners-up: AFC Hornchurch

Tournament statistics
- Matches played: 76

The 2018–19 Alan Turvey Trophy (formerly the Isthmian League Cup) was the 45th season of the Alan Turvey Trophy, the cup competition of the whole Isthmian League.

=== Calendar ===
Round	Dates	Matches	Clubs
Preliminary round	20 August to 4 September	13	77 → 64
First round	21 August to 9 October	32	64 → 32
Second round	3 October to 4 December	16	32 → 16
Third round	13 November to 18 December	8	16 → 8
Quarterfinals	15 January to 16 January	4	8 → 4
Semifinals	12 February	2	4 → 2
Final	10 April	1	2 → 1

The Isthmian League Cup was voluntary this season. Five clubs decided not to take part in the competition:

- Brightlingsea Regent
- Cray Wanderers
- Dereham Town
- Guernsey
- Lewes

=== Preliminary round ===
Twenty-six clubs participated in the Preliminary round, while fifty-one clubs received a bye to the First round.

Tie	Home team (tier)	Score	Away team (tier)	Att.
1	Aveley (N)	2–0	Hanwell Town (SC)	128
2	Bowers & Pitsea (N)	5–0	Waltham Abbey (SC)	79
3	Bracknell Town (SC)	3–3	Kingstonian (P)	201
Bracknell Town advance 5–4 on penalties
4	Corinthian-Casuals (P)	5–1	Westfield (SC)	109
5	Haywards Heath Town (SE)	2–5	Horsham (SE)	112
6	Mildenhall Town (N)	1–0	Heybridge Swifts (N)	175
7	Soham Town Rangers (N)	2–3	Uxbridge (SC)	84

Tie	Home team (tier)	Score	Away team (tier)	Att.
8	Ware (SC)	3–3	Romford (N)	72
Ware advance 5–4 on penalties
9	Whitehawk (P)	2–1	Three Bridges (SE)	179
10	Whyteleafe (SE)	2–0	Bedfont Sports (SC)	47
11	FC Romania (SC)	2–3	AFC Sudbury (N)	52
12	Sittingbourne (SE)	2–0	Phoenix Sports (SE)	80
13	Tonbridge Angels (P)	1–0	VCD Athletic (SE)	213

=== First round ===
Thirteen clubs to have made it through the preliminary round were entered into the draw with fifty-one clubs who got byes, making sixty-four clubs.

Tie	Home team (tier)	Score	Away team (tier)	Att.
14	Ashford Town (SC)	0–1	Hayes & Yeading United (SC)	145
15	Canvey Island (N)	0–1	Enfield Town (P)	188
16	Harlow Town (P)	1–2	Potters Bar Town (P)	145
17	Bracknell Town (SC)	3–1	Horsham (SE)	175
18	Chalfont St Peter (SC)	0–2	Ware (SC)	38
19	Chipstead (SC)	1–0	Dorking Wanderers (P)	111
20	Faversham Town (SE)	1–2	Burgess Hill Town (P)	128
21	Maldon & Tiptree (N)	3–2	Uxbridge (SC)	48
22	Witham Town (N)	0–0	Grays Athletic (N)	66
Witham Town advance 5–3 on penalties
23	Mildenhall Town (N)	1–2	Wingate & Finchley (P)	123
24	Leatherhead (P)	0–1	Worthing (P)	167
25	Carshalton Athletic (P)	0–3	Corinthian-Casuals (P)	225
26	Ashford United (SE)	0–4	Folkestone Invicta (P)	187
27	Barking (N)	2–2	Brentwood Town (N)	54
Brentwood Town advance 5–4 on penalties
28	Basildon United (N)	0–1	AFC Hornchurch (P)	120
29	Bognor Regis Town (P)	8–0	Whitehawk (P)	248

Tie	Home team (tier)	Score	Away team (tier)	Att.
30	Coggeshall Town (N)	2–2	Great Wakering Rovers (N)	48
Coggeshall Town advance 3–2 on penalties
31	East Grinstead Town (SE)	2–9	Hastings United (SE)	96
32	Felixstowe & Walton United (N)	0–0	AFC Sudbury (N)	113
Felixstowe & Walton United advance 4–3 on penalties
33	Herne Bay (SE)	0–6	Hythe Town (SE)	155
34	Hertford Town (SC)	1–2	Bishop's Stortford (P)	139
35	Molesey (SC)	0–1	Greenwich Borough (SE)	36
36	Northwood (SC)	2–0	Bury Town (N)	62
37	Tilbury (N)	1–0	Marlow (SC)	46
38	Tooting & Mitcham United (SC)	2–0	Margate (P)	70
39	Thamesmead Town (SE)	2–4	Merstham (P)	42
40	South Park (SC)	1–2	Sittingbourne (SE)	58
41	Aveley (N)	0–4	Cheshunt (SC)	63
42	Bowers & Pitsea (N)	3–1	Haringey Borough (P)	75
43	Egham Town (SC)	2–1	Whyteleafe (SE)	59
44	Ramsgate (SE)	0–2	Whitstable Town (SE)	135
45	Tonbridge Angels (P)	3–0	Sevenoaks Town (SE)	206

=== Second round ===
Tie	Home team (tier)	Score	Away team (tier)	Att.
46	Enfield Town (P)	2–1	Ware (SC)	202
47	AFC Hornchurch (P)	0–2	Coggeshall Town (N)	95
Coggeshall Town removed, Hornchurch reinstalled
48	Bishop's Stortford (P)	1–1	Tilbury (N)	130
Bishop's Stortford advance 8–7 on penalties
49	Burgess Hill Town (P)	2–0	Tooting & Mitcham United (SC)	129
50	Hayes & Yeading United (SC)	2–2	Potters Bar Town (P)	101
Hayes & Yeading United advance 5–4 on penalties
51	Maldon & Tiptree (N)	1–0	Witham Town (N)	137
52	Felixstowe & Walton United (N)	3–1	Northwood (SC)	165
53	Hythe Town (SE)	2–1	Bognor Regis Town (P)	168

Tie	Home team (tier)	Score	Away team (tier)	Att.
54	Cheshunt (SC)	2–1	Brentwood Town (N)	98
55	Corinthian-Casuals (P)	0–0	Chipstead (SC)	94
Chipstead advance 4–3 on penalties
56	Folkestone Invicta (P)	3–1	Sittingbourne (SE)	121
57	Egham Town (SC)	0–1	Bracknell Town (SC)	92
58	Whitstable Town (SE)	4–3	Greenwich Borough (SE)	65
59	Hastings United	1–2	Merstham (P)	198
60	Worthing (P)	0–0	Tonbridge Angels (P)	296
Worthing advance 3–2 on penalties
61	Bowers & Pitsea (N)	3–3	Wingate & Finchley (P)	73
Wingate & Finchley advance 5–4 on penalties

=== Third round ===
Tie	Home team (tier)	Score	Away team (tier)	Att.
62	Whitstable Town (SE)	4–3	Cheshunt (SC)	91
63	Folkestone Invicta (P)	2–0	Hayes & Yeading United (SC)	102
64	AFC Hornchurch (P)	3–0	Chipstead (SC)	63
65	Hythe Town (SE)	0–2	Burgess Hill Town (P)	115

Tie	Home team (tier)	Score	Away team (tier)	Att.
66	Maldon & Tiptree (N)	1–2	Enfield Town (P)	71
67	Bracknell Town (SC)	3–1	Felixstowe & Walton United (N)	171
68	Worthing (P)	1–3	Merstham (P)	202
69	Wingate & Finchley (P)	1–5	Bishop's Stortford (P)	54

=== Quarter-finals ===
Tie	Home team (tier)	Score	Away team (tier)	Att.
70	AFC Hornchurch (P)	4–1	Whitstable Town (SE)	88
71	Bracknell Town (SC)	4–1	Folkestone Invicta (P)	215

Tie	Home team (tier)	Score	Away team (tier)	Att.
72	Enfield Town (P)	4–1	Burgess Hill Town (P)	147
73	Merstham (P)	1–1	Bishop's Stortford (P)	88
Bishop's Stortford advance 3–2 on penalties

=== Semi-finals ===
Tie	Home team (tier)	Score	Away team (tier)	Att.
74	AFC Hornchurch (P)	3–2	Bracknell Town (SC)	123
75	Enfield Town (P)	3–3	Bishop's Stortford (P)	212
Enfield Town advance 4–3 on penalties

=== Final ===
10 April 2019	AFC Hornchurch (P)	0–2	Enfield Town (P)	Parkside, Aveley
19:30		Isthmian League report	Davison 57'; Chaney 63'	Attendance: 617

== See also ==
- Isthmian League
- 2018–19 Northern Premier League
- 2018–19 Southern Football League
