= Dunmow Town F.C. =

Dunmow Town
- Full name: Dunmow Town Football Club
- Founded: June 2020; 6 years ago
- Ground: Scraley Road Stadium (Heybridge Swifts FC)
- Capacity: 3,000 ( 500 Seated)
- Chairman: Paul Oglesby
- Manager: Elliot Thompson
- League: Eastern Counties League Division One South
- 2025–26: Eastern Counties League Division One South, 16th of 21
Home colours

Dunmow Town Football Club is a football club based in Great Dunmow, England. They are currently members of the Eastern Counties League Division One South and play at Scraley Road Stadium, groundsharing with Heybridge Swifts.

== History ==
In June 2020, Dunmow Town were formed, joining the Essex and Suffolk Border League. In 2023, the club was admitted into the Eastern Counties League Division One South after winning the Essex and Suffolk Border League.

Ahead of the 2025–26 season, Dunmow entered a groundsharing agreement at Hoddesdon Town's Lowfield ground, before the agreement was terminated in November 2025 and Dunmow's remaining fixtures in the Eastern Counties League were cancelled. In December 2025, it was announced the club had folded, however, later that month, the club were reinstated back into the Eastern Counties League, returning to groundshare with Hoddesdon Town in the process.

== Ground ==
Upon formation, Dunmow groundshared with Braintree Town at their Cressing Road ground. In July 2022, it was announced that Dunmow would enter a groundsharing agreement with Heybridge Swifts to play at Scraley Road. Ahead of the 2023–24 season, the club confirmed they would be groundsharing with Saffron Walden Town at Catons Lane.
