= Cannons Wood F.C. =

English football club

Coordinates: 51°46′15.740″N 0°4′4.159″E

Cannons Wood
- Full name: Cannons Wood Football Club
- Nickname: The Cannons
- Founded: 2019; 7 years ago
- Ground: Parkside Stadium, Aveley
- Capacity: 3,500 (423 seated)
- Manager: Luke With , Michael Williams
- League: Eastern Counties League Division One South
- 2025–26: Eastern Counties League Division One South, 12th of 21
| Home colours | Away colours |

Cannons Wood Football Club is a non-league football club based in Harlow, England. They are currently members of the Eastern Counties League Division One South and play at Parkside Stadium, Aveley.

== History ==
Formed as DTFC in 2019 by AFTV contributor, Liam Goodenough, the club initially entered the Essex Alliance League. In January 2022, the club announced they had applied to the Football Association to rebrand the club after gaining promotion into Step 6 of the non-league pyramid. Later that year, the club was admitted into the Eastern Counties League Division One South under the new name of Cannons Wood. The name originates from the nearby Canons Brook estate in Harlow.

== Ground ==
In 2020, the club entered a groundsharing agreement with Harlow Town to play at the Harlow Arena. However, following the suspension of football activities at Harlow Town, in December 2022 Cannons Wood began playing their home games at Goffs Lane, Cheshunt, the former home of Broxbourne Borough.

In March 2023, it was announced that Cannons Wood would be groundsharing with Aveley at Parkside for the 2023–24 season.

== Honours ==
- Essex Alliance League
  - Cup winners: 2020–21
- Essex Alliance League
  - Fenton Cup winners: 2020–21
- Essex Alliance League
  - Senior Division champions: 2021–22
- Essex Alliance League
  - Senior Division Cup winners: 2021–22
