= 2023–24 Eastern Counties Football League =

The 2023–24 Eastern Counties Football League was the 81st season in the history of the Eastern Counties Football League, a football competition in England. Teams are divided into three divisions, the Premier Division at Step 5, and the geographically separated Division One North and Division One South (Eastern Senior League), both at Step 6 of the English football league system.

The constitution was announced on 15 May 2023. Starting this season, the Premier Division in the league promotes two clubs; one as champions and one via a four-team play-off. This replaced the previous inter-step play-off system. For this season only, there was only one club relegated from the Step 5 division.

== Premier Division ==
Eastern Counties Football League Premier Division
- Season: 2023–24
- Champions: Mildenhall Town
- Promoted: Mildenhall Town; Newmarket Town
- Matches: 342
- Goals: 1,096 (3.2 per match)
- Top goalscorer: Ashley Jarvis (31)
- Biggest home win: Harleston Town 6–0 Brantham Athletic (6 April 2024)
- Biggest away win: Soham Town Rangers 0–6 Mulbarton Wanderers (20 April 2024)
- Highest scoring: Dereham Town 5–6 Mulbarton Wanderers (2 March 2024)

The Premier Division featured 17 clubs which competed in the division last season, along with three new clubs:

- Dereham Town, relegated from the Northern Premier League
- Downham Town, promoted from Division One North
- Heacham, promoted from Division One North

=== League table ===
Pos	Team	Pld	W	D	L	GF	GA	GD	Pts	Promotion, qualification or relegation
1	Mildenhall Town (C, P)	36	29	5	2	73	16	+57	92	Promoted to the Isthmian League North
2	Newmarket Town (O, P)	36	24	6	6	92	44	+48	78	Qualified for the play-offs
3	Mulbarton Wanderers	36	21	7	8	80	46	+34	70	Qualified for the play-offs
4	Thetford Town	35	20	7	8	67	42	+25	70	Qualified for the play-offs
5	Dereham Town	36	21	6	9	77	48	+29	69	Qualified for the play-offs
6	Harleston Town	36	20	5	11	74	53	+21	65	
7	Downham Town	36	18	7	11	67	42	+25	61	
8	Walsham-le-Willows	36	16	9	11	68	48	+20	57	
9	Fakenham Town	36	15	11	10	63	45	+18	56	
10	Lakenheath	36	15	4	17	68	74	−6	49	
11	Hadleigh United	36	12	8	16	52	68	−16	44	
12	Soham Town Rangers	36	14	2	20	56	79	−23	44	
13	Woodbridge Town	36	10	6	20	43	59	−16	36	
14	Sheringham	36	10	6	20	46	70	−24	36	
15	Ely City	36	8	5	23	43	71	−28	29	
16	Brantham Athletic	36	7	8	21	36	70	−34	29	
17	Long Melford	36	7	9	20	32	70	−38	30	
18	Heacham	35	7	7	21	27	67	−40	28	
19	Kirkley & Pakefield	36	5	6	25	32	84	−52	21	
20	Norwich United (Note: Norwich United announced their withdrawal from the league on 14 September 2023 after multiple scandals.) (W)	0	0	0	0	0	0	0	0	Withdrew from league

Source: The FA Full-Time
Rules for classification: 1) Points; 2) Goal difference; 3) Number of goals scored; 4) Number of matches won; 5) Head-to-head results
(C) Champions; (O) Play-off winners; (P) Promoted; (W) Withdrew

=== Play-offs ===
Semi-finals
2	Newmarket Town	3
5	Dereham Town	1
3	Mulbarton Wanderers	2
4	Thetford Town	1

Final
2	Newmarket Town	2
3	Mulbarton Wanderers	0

==== Semifinals ====
27 April	Newmarket Town	3–1	Dereham Town	Newmarket
15:00	Conway 5', 79' (pen.); Cole 72'	Report	Logan 21'	Stadium: Cricket Field Road; Attendance: 386; Referee: Matt Rowling

14 May	Mulbarton Wanderers	2–1	Thetford Town	Mulbarton
19:45	Easton; Jarvis	Report	Fuller	Stadium: Mulberry Park; Attendance: 312; Referee: Jordan Sandwell

==== Final ====
18 May	Newmarket Town	2–0	Mulbarton Wanderers	Newmarket
15:00	Conway; Foster	Report		Stadium: Cricket Field Road; Attendance: 930; Referee: Cameron Saunders

Note: Thetford Town played an ineligible player in their play-off semi-final away at Mulbarton Wanderers on 27 April 2024. The league originally removed Thetford from the playoffs and instated Mulbarton into the final. Following an appeal by Thetford, the FA ordered the semi-final to be replayed.

=== Stadia and locations ===
Locations of the Premier Division clubs

Team	Stadium	Capacity
Brantham Athletic	Brantham Leisure Centre	1,200
Dereham Town	Aldiss Park	3,000
Downham Town	Memorial Field	1,000
Ely City	Unwin Sports Ground	1,500
Fakenham Town	Clipbush Park	2,000
Hadleigh United	Millfield	3,000
Harleston Town	Wilderness Lane	
Heacham	Station Road	
Kirkley & Pakefield	Walmer Road	2,000
Lakenheath	The Nest	
Long Melford	Stoneylands	
Mildenhall Town	Recreation Way	2,000
Mulbarton Wanderers	The Common	
Newmarket Town	Cricket Field Road	2,750
Norwich United	Plantation Park	3,000
Sheringham	Weybourne Road	
Soham Town Rangers	Julius Martin Lane	2,000
Thetford Town	Mundford Road	1,500
Walsham-le-Willows	Summer Road	1,000
Woodbridge Town	Notcutts Park	3,000

== Division One North ==
Eastern Counties Football League Division One North
- Season: 2023–24
- Champions: Great Yarmouth Town
- Promoted: Great Yarmouth Town; Cornard United
- Matches: 420
- Goals: 1,730 (4.12 per match)
- Top goalscorer: Kyle Richardson (36)
- Biggest home win: AFC Sudbury reserves 10–0 Needham Market under 23s (26 August 2023)
- Biggest away win: Leiston under 23s 0–7 AFC Sudbury reserves (1 August 2023)
- Highest scoring: Norwich CBS 7–4 Haverhill Borough (9 March 2024)

Division One North featured 15 clubs which competed in the previous season, along with six new clubs.

- Relegated from the Premier Division
  - Haverhill Rovers
  - Whitton United
- Transferred from Division One South
  - Stanway Pegasus
  - Wivenhoe Town
- Plus:
  - Dussindale & Hellesdon Rovers, promoted from the Anglian Combination
  - FC Peterborough, promoted from the Peterborough and District League

=== League table ===
Pos	Team	Pld	W	D	L	GF	GA	GD	Pts	Promotion, qualification or relegation
1	Great Yarmouth Town (C, P)	40	29	7	4	103	49	+54	94	Promoted to the Premier Division
2	Framlingham Town	40	28	5	7	122	48	+74	89	Qualified for the play-offs
3	Holland	40	24	7	9	103	64	+39	79	Qualified for the play-offs
4	Stanway Pegasus	40	24	5	11	101	40	+61	77	Qualified for the play-offs
5	Cornard United (O, P)	40	23	6	11	112	84	+28	75	Qualified for the play-offs
6	Holbeach United	40	20	6	14	84	65	+19	66	
7	Harwich & Parkeston	40	20	5	15	80	62	+18	65	
8	Diss Town	40	18	8	14	70	69	+1	62	
9	Dussindale & Hellesdon Rovers	40	18	7	15	80	63	+17	61	
10	Haverhill Rovers	40	19	4	17	90	89	+1	61	
11	FC Peterborough	40	17	3	20	91	95	−4	54	
12	Wivenhoe Town	40	15	7	18	71	93	−22	52	
13	AFC Sudbury reserves	40	15	6	19	88	90	−2	51	
14	FC Parson Drove	40	15	5	20	82	93	−11	50	
15	Norwich CBS	40	13	6	21	86	120	−34	45	Folded at the end of the season
16	Whittlesey Athletic	40	12	8	20	66	87	−21	44	
17	Whitton United	40	12	5	23	58	83	−25	41	
18	Leiston under 23s	40	12	3	25	70	107	−37	39	
19	Swaffham Town	40	11	5	24	63	94	−31	38	
20	Haverhill Borough	40	9	6	25	49	110	−61	33	
21	Needham Market under 23s	40	6	6	28	61	125	−64	24	Reprieved from relegation

Source: The FA Full-Time
Rules for classification: 1) Points; 2) Goal difference; 3) Number of goals scored; 4) Number of matches won; 5) Head-to-head results
(C) Champions; (O) Play-off winners; (P) Promoted

=== Play-offs ===
Semi-finals
2	Framlingham Town	1
5	Cornard United	2
3	Holland	3
4	Stanway Pegasus	0

Final
3	Holland	1
5	Cornard United	3

==== Semifinals ====
27 April	Framlingham Town	1–2	Cornard United	Framlingham
15:00	Exworth 9'	Report	Spurling 33'; Nasso 73'	Stadium: Badingham Road; Attendance: 151; Referee: Andrew Crossley

27 April	Holland	3–0	Stanway Pegasus	Holland-on-Sea
15:00	Dixon; Marshall	Report		Stadium: Dulwich Road; Attendance: 410; Referee: Lee Kendrick

==== Final ====
4 May	Holland	1–3	Cornard United	Holland-on-Sea
15:00		Report	Berkane 5'; Spurling 57' (pen.), 60'	Stadium: Dulwich Road; Attendance: 455; Referee: Bruno Marques

=== Stadia and locations ===
Locations of Division One North clubs

Team	Stadium	Capacity
AFC Sudbury reserves	King's Marsh	2,500
Cornard United	Blackhouse Lane	
Diss Town	Brewers Green Lane	2,500
Dussindale & Hellesdon Rovers	The Nest	1,000
FC Parson Drove	Main Road	
FC Peterborough	The Focus Centre	
Framlingham Town	Badingham Road	
Great Yarmouth Town	Wellesley Recreation Ground	3,600
Harwich & Parkeston	Royal Oak	
Haverhill Borough	New Croft (artificial, groundshare with Haverhill Rovers)	3,000
Haverhill Rovers	New Croft	3,000
Holbeach United	Carters Park	4,000
Holland	Dulwich Road	
Leiston u23s	Victory Road	2,500
Needham Market u23s	Bloomfields	4,000
Norwich CBS	FDC Bowthorpe	
Stanway Pegasus	The Stanway School	
Swaffham Town	Shoemakers Lane	
Whittlesey Athletic	Feldale Field	
Whitton United	King George V Playing Fields	1,000
Wivenhoe Town	Broad Lane	2,876

== Division One South ==
Eastern Counties Football League Division One South
- Season: 2023–24
- Champions: Benfleet
- Promoted: Benfleet; Wormley Rovers
- Matches: 462
- Goals: 1,775 (3.84 per match)
- Top goalscorer: Stuart Zanone (36)
- Biggest home win: Cannons Wood 8–1 Clapton (13 April 2024); Hutton 8–1 NW London (16 March 2024); Wormley Rovers 7–0 Park View (16 September 2023)
- Biggest away win: Barkingside 1–9 Wormley Rovers (1 March 2024)
- Highest scoring: St Margaretsbury 8–3 Basildon Town (21 October 2023)

Division One South featured 14 clubs which competed in the division last season, along with eight new clubs:

- Brimsdown, promoted from the Essex Alliance League
- Clapton, relegated from the Essex Senior League
- Clapton Community, promoted from the Middlesex County League
- Dunmow Town, promoted from the Essex and Suffolk Border League
- Harlow Town, resigned from the Southern League
- Hoddesdon Town, relegated from the Spartan South Midlands League
- Hutton, promoted from the Essex Olympian League
- Southend Manor, relegated from the Essex Senior League

=== League table ===
Pos	Team	Pld	W	D	L	GF	GA	GD	Pts	Promotion, qualification or relegation
1	Benfleet (C, P)	42	33	4	5	108	32	+76	103	Promoted to the Essex Senior League
2	Wormley Rovers (O, P)	42	30	7	5	111	37	+74	97	Qualified for the play-offs
3	Harlow Town (Note: Harlow Town are ineligible for promotion due to withdrawal from the national league system midway through last season.)	42	28	7	7	105	48	+57	91	
4	Hutton	42	25	6	11	89	55	+34	81	Qualified for the play-offs
5	Dunmow Town	42	23	7	12	96	73	+23	76	Qualified for the play-offs
6	Clapton Community	42	19	15	8	78	54	+24	72	Qualified for the play-offs, then transferred to the Southern Counties East League
7	Cannons Wood	42	20	11	11	103	60	+43	71	
8	Hackney Wick	42	19	6	17	84	77	+7	63	
9	Brimsdown	42	17	8	17	73	57	+16	59	
10	Hoddesdon Town	42	16	10	16	70	66	+4	58	
11	May & Baker	42	16	7	19	77	78	−1	55	
12	Basildon Town	42	14	11	17	69	78	−9	53	
13	Enfield Borough	42	14	9	19	79	95	−16	51	
14	Newbury Forest	42	15	2	25	72	102	−30	47	
15	Tower Hamlets	42	13	7	22	70	96	−26	46	Transferred to the Southern Counties East League
16	Barkingside	42	13	6	23	58	91	−33	45	
17	NW London	42	14	3	25	84	123	−39	45	
18	Clapton	42	12	7	23	61	105	−44	43	Transferred to the Southern Counties East League
19	Southend Manor	42	12	5	25	78	107	−29	41	
20	Park View	42	12	4	26	65	115	−50	40	
21	St Margaretsbury	42	12	2	28	72	110	−38	38	
22	Burnham Ramblers	42	11	4	27	73	116	−43	37	Reprieved from relegation

Source: The FA Full-Time
Rules for classification: 1) Points; 2) Goal difference; 3) Number of goals scored; 4) Number of matches won; 5) Head-to-head results
(C) Champions; (O) Play-off winners; (P) Promoted

=== Play-offs ===
Semi-finals
2	Wormley Rovers	3
6	Clapton Community	2
5	Dunmow Town	1
4	Hutton	0

Final
2	Wormley Rovers	2
5	Dunmow Town	1

==== Semifinals ====
27 April	Wormley Rovers	3–2	Clapton Community	Wormley
15:00	Mosanya 63' (pen.); Tolley 88'; Asiedu 90+13'	Report	Fagan 45+15'; Goldring 82'	Stadium: Wormley Playing Fields; Attendance: 328; Referee: James Black

27 April	Dunmow Town	1–0	Hutton	Heybridge
15:00	Cansdale	Report		Stadium: Scraley Road; Attendance: 61; Referee: Sam Wigington

==== Final ====
4 May	Wormley Rovers	2–1	Dunmow Town	Wormley
15:00	Hammond; Empson	Report	Zanone	Stadium: Wormley Playing Fields; Attendance: 358; Referee: Jordan Sandwell

=== Stadia and locations ===
Locations of Division One South clubs
Greater London Division One South football clubs

Team	Stadium	Capacity
Barkingside	Cricklefield Stadium (groundshare with Ilford)	3,500
Basildon Town	Rookery Hill (groundshare with East Thurrock United)	3,500
Benfleet	Park Lane (groundshare with Canvey Island)	4,100
Brimsdown	Wormley Playing Fields (groundshare with Wormley Rovers)	500
Burnham Ramblers	Leslie Fields	2,000
Cannons Wood	Parkside Stadium (groundshare with Aveley)	3,500
Clapton	Terence McMillan Stadium (groundshare with Athletic Newham)	2,000
Clapton Community	The Old Spotted Dog Ground	2,000
Dunmow Town	Scraley Road (groundshare with Heybridge Swifts)	3,000
Enfield Borough	The Maurice Rebak Stadium (groundshare with Wingate & Finchley)	1,500
Hackney Wick	Spa Road (groundshare with Witham Town)	2,500
Harlow Town	The Harlow Arena	3,500
Hoddesdon Town	Lowfield	3,000
Hutton	New Lodge (groundshare with Billericay Town)	3,500
May & Baker	Parkside Stadium (groundshare with Aveley)	3,500
Newbury Forest	Oakside Stadium (groundshare with Redbridge)	3,000
NW London	The Harlow Arena (groundshare with Harlow Town)	2,000
Park View	New River Stadium	5,000
Southend Manor	Southchurch Park	2,000
St Margaretsbury	Recreation Ground	1,000
Tower Hamlets	Mile End Stadium (groundshare with Sporting Bengal United)	2,000
Wormley Rovers	Wormley Playing Fields	500
