= London APSA F.C. =

Association football club in England

London APSA
- Full name: London All Peoples' Sports Association Football Club
- Founded: 1993 (as Ahle Sunnah)
- Ground: Flanders Playing Fields
- Chairman: Zulfi Ali
- Manager: Hafiz Ahmed
- League: Essex Alliance Premier Division East
Home colours	Away colours

London All Peoples' Sports Association Football Club is a non-League football club, based in Plaistow, London, England. They are currently members of the Essex Alliance Premier Division East.

== History ==
The club was formed in 1993, corresponding with the creation of the first Asian Football League (AFL). They were originally known as Ahle Sunnah. The team was set up by a group of friends from East Ham College in Newham who teamed up with a local youth team, known as Young Muslims, who were no longer eligible to play under-16s football. London APSA were crowned the first-ever Asian League Champions.

The club competed in Asian-run competitions until they decided to join the London Intermediate League in 2000. However, the club resigned pre-season and joined the Essex Business Houses League Senior Intermediate Division. They played in that division for three seasons, after which they joined the Essex Senior League for the start of the 2003–04 season and remained in the league until 2016.

In 2014 the club was renamed Newham Football Club. At the end of the 2015–16 season, the club resigned from the Essex Senior League after finishing bottom of the table, dropping into the Essex Olympian League. The club also reverted to being named London APSA.

== Club records ==
- Highest League Position: 9th in Essex Senior League 2005–06
