= Jamie O'Hara (footballer) =

English footballer (born 1986)

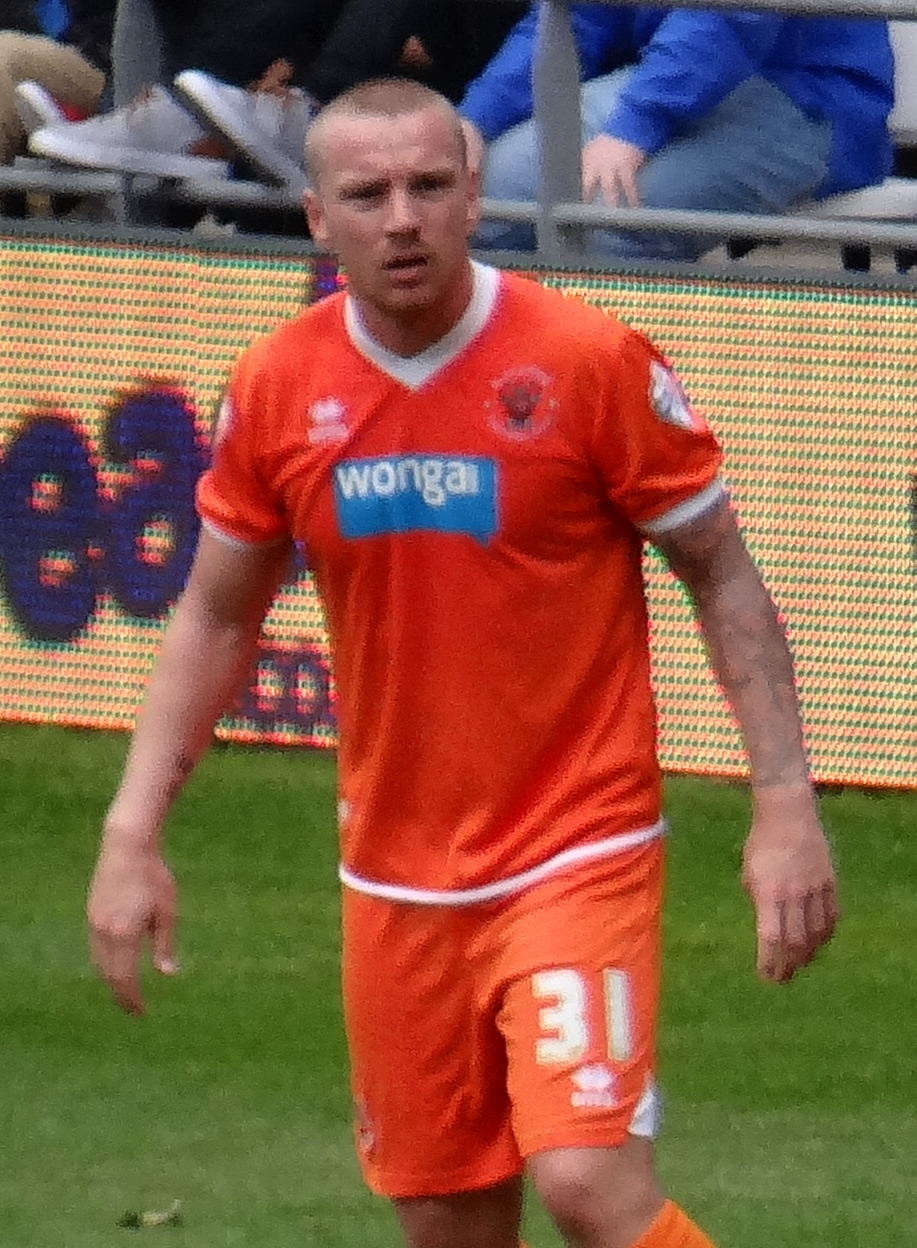
- O'Hara playing for Blackpool in 2015

Personal information
- Full name: Jamie Darryl O'Hara
- Date of birth: 25 September 1986 (age 40)
- Place of birth: Dartford, England
- Height: 5 ft 11 in (1.80 m)
- Position: Midfielder

Youth career
- 1998–2003: Arsenal
- 2003–2005: Tottenham Hotspur

Senior career*
Years	Team	Apps	(Gls)
2005–2011	Tottenham Hotspur	34	(2)
2006	→ Chesterfield (loan)	19	(5)
2007	→ Millwall (loan)	14	(2)
2009–2010	→ Portsmouth (loan)	26	(2)
2011	→ Wolverhampton Wanderers (loan)	14	(3)
2011–2014	Wolverhampton Wanderers	41	(2)
2014–2015	Blackpool	27	(2)
2015–2016	Fulham	37	(1)
2016	Gillingham	2	(0)
2017–2020	Billericay Town	47	(4)
Total		261	(23)

International career
2001–2002	England U16	8	(0)
2002–2003	England U17	9	(0)
2008–2009	England U21	7	(0)

Managerial career
- 2019–2020: Billericay Town
- * Club domestic league appearances and goals

Jamie Darryl O'Hara (born 25 September 1986) is an English former football player and manager. He currently works as a radio co-host for Talksport's The Sports Bar with Jason Cundy.

O'Hara played as a midfielder and came through the Arsenal Academy before signing for and going on to feature in the Premier League for Tottenham Hotspur. He later played top flight football with both Portsmouth and Wolverhampton Wanderers. He was part of the Pompey team that reached the 2010 FA Cup Final. He also played in the Football League for Chesterfield, Millwall, Blackpool, Fulham and Gillingham. He retired following a spell as player/manager of non-league side Billericay Town. O'Hara was capped seven times at England U21 level.

== Early life and education ==
O'Hara was born in Dartford, Kent. He was educated at Horton Kirby (Church of England) Primary School, He then went on to Hextable Comprehensive School in Kent and Highams Park School.

== Club career ==
=== Early career ===
O'Hara joined Arsenal's Academy at 12. O'Hara was offered a professional contract with Arsenal in 2003 at 17, but declined to sign as Arsenal's Head of Youth Development Liam Brady informed him that the earliest he would break into the first team was at age 21.

He subsequently joined Tottenham's academy, where he featured in every game in the 2004-05 FA Youth Cup, scoring once against Everton from a free kick in addition to playing in fourteen Under-18 matches and eighteen reserve matches. In January 2006 he joined Chesterfield on a three-month loan agreement. His Football League debut came on 14 January 2006 at Doncaster Rovers in a 1–1 draw. He scored five goals during his loan spell during 19 appearances.

He went out on loan for a second time in August 2007 when he joined League One club Millwall on a month-long loan deal which was subsequently extended to December, making 15 appearances total.

=== Tottenham Hotspur ===
O'Hara subsequently returned to Spurs after his successful loan spell at Millwall which attracted the attention of new manager, Juande Ramos, and made his debut as a substitute against Portsmouth on 15 December 2007, assisting in the game's winning goal. He made his full début a week later in the North London derby against former club Arsenal. He also contributed two appearances to Spurs' run in the 2007–08 Football League Cup, but was left out of the squad for the final itself.

He became a regular player for the remainder of the season, scoring his first Tottenham goal on 21 February 2008 in a UEFA Cup tie against Slavia Prague at White Hart Lane, and his first Premier League goal on 22 March 2008, against Portsmouth. At the end of the season, he was named the One Hotspur Junior Young Player of the Year and was presented with the Tottenham Hotspur Supporters Trust Breakthrough Award for his performances. He was further rewarded by a new three-year deal.

The arrival of Harry Redknapp as manager during the next season saw O'Hara gradually lose his regular place in the league. He did however make a vital contribution in the club's League Cup semi-final tie against Burnley, as he scored one goal and helped create two more in a 4–1 first leg victory that helped see them through to the final. Unlike the previous year, O'Hara was included in their squad for the final. Coming on as a substitute, he also stepped up to take the first penalty kick in the shootout against Manchester United, after the match finished goalless; his effort was saved by Ben Foster as Spurs lost 1–4 on penalties. O'Hara signed a new contract in August, keeping him at White Hart Lane until 2013.

==== Loan to Portsmouth ====
After signing a new deal with Tottenham, O'Hara joined Portsmouth on loan until January 2010, with an option to remain at Fratton Park until the end of the season. He was a regular starter for Pompey during this time, but returned to Tottenham in January 2010 despite Portsmouth wanting to extend his loan and Tottenham agreeing to this, as Portsmouth were subject to a transfer embargo. Following the lifting of Portsmouth's transfer embargo weeks later, he returned to Portsmouth on loan for the remainder of the season.

His loan spell created a conflict of interests when Portsmouth were drawn to play the winners of the Tottenham/Fulham tie in the FA Cup semi-finals. Tottenham manager Harry Redknapp gave a stern reminder to O'Hara that his ultimate loyalties lay with Tottenham, after the midfielder admitted he hoped Spurs would lose to Fulham as he would not be eligible to play against Tottenham. Tottenham did indeed progress to the semi-final, meaning O'Hara was denied a chance to play in the Wembley match. However, Portsmouth won the game 2–0, giving him a chance to play in the FA Cup Final where they were beaten 1–0 by Chelsea. At end of the season O'Hara was voted Portsmouth's Player of the Season for 2009–10.

With O'Hara having sustained a stress fracture during the 2009–10 season, it was announced in August 2010 that he was to undergo back surgery. This kept him out contention for any first team football until the New Year.

=== Wolverhampton Wanderers ===
On 30 January 2011, O'Hara joined Premier League side Wolverhampton Wanderers on loan for the rest of the 2010–11 season, with a view to a permanent deal. O'Hara made his Wolves debut as a substitute against Bolton Wanderers three days later. He made his first start on 5 February 2011, playing 60 minutes of a 2–1 victory against league leaders Manchester United. He scored his first goal for Wolves against local rivals West Bromwich Albion on 20 February 2011. He scored on the final day of the season, in a 2–3 defeat against Blackburn Rovers, which helped Wolves narrowly avoid relegation. The season concluded with him winning the Goal of the Season Award, for his strike against local rivals West Bromwich Albion.

On 21 June 2011, it was announced that O'Hara had signed a five-year contract with Wolves for an undisclosed fee, initially reported to be around £5 million. It was later reported that the actual fee Wolves paid for O'Hara was £3.5 million, not the £5 million quoted. He decided to move to Wolves permanently after missing out on first team football for Tottenham.

O'Hara's first full season with the club saw him miss several months of the campaign after twice undergoing surgery, firstly on a double hernia, then to correct a persistent groin problem. He did not return to first team action until January 2013, by which time the club were back in the Championship and had undergone a series of manager changes.

The midfielder made 21 appearances during the second half of the 2012–13 season but was unable to halt a second successive relegation. In April 2013, he was sent off for violent conduct in a defeat by Huddersfield Town, which ruled him out for three games. Upon his return at the final game of the season that confirmed relegation, O'Hara responded to jeers from the Wolves fans by sarcastically clapping them. He had previously clashed with fans in March 2012 after being confronted by a group outside Molineux.

Following the arrival of Kenny Jackett as manager, it was announced in June 2013 that O'Hara had been made available for transfer. At the beginning of the new season, O'Hara was not allocated a squad number and Jackett reiterated that he remained outside his plans. However, by late October, with no interest from other clubs, Jackett stated that "the last four months have humbled him (O'Hara)" and that "everyone at the club is willing to give him a second chance". O'Hara was thus given a squad number and withdrawn from the transfer list. He made his playing return in a 2–2 draw at Carlisle and also featured in the following game.

O'Hara fell out of first team contention after these appearances, with manager Kenny Jackett citing his lack of fitness. He spent a short trial period at Blackpool in late November 2013 but they did not pursue their interest in taking him on loan. Without any involvement in Wolves' first team for several months, O'Hara requested that Wolves permit him to undertake an intense three-week training programme (at his own expense) at a training facility in Los Angeles, which he did in February 2014. After returning, he featured as an over-age player for Wolves' under-21 games, with Kenny Jackett saying that he was "surprised nobody has taken him" and that he hoped that "somebody wants to take a chance (on O'Hara)" before the close of the loan window. However, the only reported loan interest came from his former club Portsmouth, now near the foot of League Two, but no deal was agreed.

Shortly after having not been issued a squad number for the new season, on 28 August 2014, O'Hara's contract was terminated with immediate effect by mutual consent.

=== Blackpool ===
On 5 November 2014, O'Hara joined Blackpool on a short-term contract until 4 January 2015. He made his debut against Leeds United on 8 November in a 3–1 loss. On 8 January 2015 O'Hara extended his deal at Blackpool until the end of the season.

=== Fulham ===
On 7 July 2015, O'Hara joined Fulham on a one-year contract. O'Hara made his debut for Fulham in the opening game of the season in a 1–1 draw against Cardiff City. He scored his first goal for Fulham in a 3–2 defeat at Sheffield Wednesday on 19 September 2015. O'Hara was released on 9 June 2016.

=== Gillingham ===
On 12 August 2016 O'Hara signed for Gillingham on a two-year contract. On 30 September 2016, the club and player mutually agreed to terminate his contract after his failure to recover from an ongoing injury.

=== Billericay Town ===
On 23 March 2017, BBC Sport confirmed that O'Hara had joined Billericay Town of the Isthmian League Premier Division, in the seventh tier of English football. The article also reported that "Billericay have recently been taken over by multi-millionaire Glenn Tamplin, who said shortly after completing a deal for the club that he was "comfortable" investing £10,000 a week." It was also revealed that O'Hara had agreed to forfeit his wages if he was injured and that a clause would allow him to leave if a "Championship or above" club comes in for him.

On 16 April 2017, it was announced that O'Hara had been fined two weeks' wages by Billericay for getting into a physical altercation with a young supporter following a 3–2 defeat by Leatherhead on 15 April 2017.

O'Hara left Billericay Town in December 2018, but returned to the club a month later as player/assistant manager. He became player-manager in September 2019, stating that the only way he could get a game each week would be if he was picking the team.

On 3 December 2020, it was announced that O'Hara and his assistant manager Paul Konchesky had both parted company with Billericay Town.

== International career ==
O'Hara was called up to the England under-21 squad for their game against Republic of Ireland on 5 February 2008, but did not take the field. He did gain his first U21 cap on 25 March 2008, in a 0–0 friendly against Poland. In total he won seven caps at this level.

On 21 February 2011, O'Hara admitted that he would seriously consider playing international football for the Republic of Ireland if he got the call. O'Hara had played at the England under-21 level but had never been selected for the senior squad, and with Irish grandparents, he could now make the switch. Former Wolves manager Mick McCarthy also said that he too wished O'Hara to make the switch to Ireland.

He was also eligible for Northern Ireland as his father was born in Magherafelt.

== Personal life ==
O'Hara married former Miss England model Danielle Lloyd on 26 May 2012. They had three sons together. Lloyd filed for divorce in 2014, after O'Hara had admitted to cheating on her on a night out.

Out of contract after leaving Gillingham, he participated in series 19 of the reality TV show Celebrity Big Brother in January 2017. In September 2021, he became host of Talksport's The Sports Bar alongside Jason Cundy. He also was on the TV series Love Undercover in 2024.

== Career statistics ==
As of match played 14 March 2020

Appearances and goals by club, season and competition
Club	Season	League			FA Cup		League Cup		Europe		Other		Total	
Club	Season	Division	Apps	Goals	Apps	Goals	Apps	Goals	Apps	Goals	Apps	Goals	Apps	Goals
Tottenham Hotspur	2005–06	Premier League	0	0	0	0	0	0	—		—		0	0
Tottenham Hotspur	2006–07	Premier League	0	0	0	0	0	0	0	0	—		0	0
Tottenham Hotspur	2007–08	Premier League	17	1	2	0	2	0	4 (Note: Appearances in UEFA Cup)	1	—		25	2
Tottenham Hotspur	2008–09	Premier League	15	1	1	0	6	2	6	1	—		28	4
Tottenham Hotspur	2009–10	Premier League	2	0	0	0	1	1	—		—		3	1
Tottenham Hotspur	2010–11	Premier League	0	0	0	0	0	0	0	0	—		0	0
Tottenham Hotspur	Total		34	2	3	0	9	3	10	2	—		56	7
Chesterfield (loan)	2005–06	League One	19	5	—		—		—		—		19	5
Millwall (loan)	2007–08	League One	14	2	0	0	0	0	—		1 (Note: Appearance in Football League Trophy)	0	15	2
Portsmouth (loan)	2009–10	Premier League	26	2	3	1	0	0	—		—		29	3
Wolverhampton Wanderers (loan)	2010–11	Premier League	14	3	0	0	0	0	—		—		14	3
Wolverhampton Wanderers	2011–12	Premier League	19	2	0	0	1	0	—		—		20	3
Wolverhampton Wanderers	2012–13	Championship	20	0	1	0	0	0	—		—		21	0
Wolverhampton Wanderers	2013–14	League One	2	0	0	0	0	0	—		0	0	2	0
Wolverhampton Wanderers	Total		41	2	1	0	1	0	—		0	0	43	2
Blackpool	2014–15	Championship	27	2	1	0	0	0	—		—		28	2
Fulham	2015–16	Championship	37	1	1	0	1	0	—		—		39	1
Gillingham	2016–17	League One	2	0	0	0	0	0	—		1 (Note: Appearance in EFL Trophy)	0	3	0
Billericay Town	2016–17	Isthmian League Premier Division	7	1	—		—		—		1 (Note: Appearance in Alan Turvey Trophy)	0	8	1
Billericay Town	2017–18	Isthmian League Premier Division	17	3	0	0	—		—		7 (Note: Four appearances in FA Trophy, three in Alan Turvey Trophy)	0	24	3
Billericay Town	2018–19	National League South	19	0	5	0	—		—		1 (Note: Appearance in FA Trophy)	0	25	0
Billericay Town	2019–20	National League South	4	0	1	0	—		—		0	0	5	0
Billericay Town	Total		47	4	6	0	—		—		9	0	62	4
Career total			261	23	15	1	11	3	10	2	11	0	308	29

== Honours ==
Tottenham Hotspur

- Football League Cup: 2007–08; runner-up: 2008–09

Portsmouth

- FA Cup runner-up: 2009–10

Billericay Town

- Isthmian League Premier Division: 2017–18
- Isthmian League Cup: 2016–17, 2017–18
- Essex Senior Cup: 2017–18

Individual

- Portsmouth Player of the Season: 2009–10
