= 2017–18 Isthmian League =

The 2017–18 season was the 103rd season of the Isthmian League, which is an English football competition featuring semi-professional and amateur clubs from London, East and South East England. It was also the twelfth season for the current incarnations of the Premier, North and South Divisions, the last to have two regional divisions, and the first as the Bostik League following a sponsorship deal with Bostik.

In May 2017, the FA chose the Southern League to create one additional division at Step 3 and the Isthmian League to create one at Step 4 as part of the next change to the structure, and in March 2018, the Northern Premier League voted to reorganise its Step 4 divisions into an east-west alignment, with all Step 3 divisions contracting to 22 clubs and those at Step 4 to 20, taking effect in the 2018–19 season.

== Premier Division ==
Isthmian League Premier Division
- Season: 2017–18
- Champions: Billericay Town
- Promoted: Billericay Town; Dulwich Hamlet
- Relegated: Tooting & Mitcham United
- Matches: 552
- Goals: 1,769 (3.2 per match)
- Top goalscorer: 39 goals - Elliott Buchanan (Staines Town)
- Total attendance: 150,936
- Average attendance: 273 (-18.3% to previous season)

The Premier Division consisted of 24 clubs: 19 clubs from the previous season, and five new clubs:

- Brightlingsea Regent, promoted as champions of Division One North
- Dorking Wanderers, promoted as play-off winners in Division One South
- Margate, relegated from the National League South
- Thurrock, promoted as play-off winners in Division One North
- Tooting & Mitcham United, promoted as champions of Division One South

Billericay Town won the division and returned to National League South after five seasons in the Isthmian League. Dulwich Hamlet, who competed in the Isthmian League since its establishment in 1907, won the play-offs and followed them. Only one club was relegated from the Premier Division; Tooting & Mitcham finished bottom of the table and returned straight back to step 4.

At the end of the season a new step 3 division was created under the Southern Football League; seven Premier Division clubs were transferred to the Southern League Premier divisions. The number of clubs in the Premier Division was reduced to 22 for the next season.

=== League table ===
Pos	Team	Pld	W	D	L	GF	GA	GD	Pts	Promotion, qualification or relegation
1	Billericay Town	46	30	9	7	110	50	+60	99	Promoted to the National League South
2	Dulwich Hamlet	46	28	11	7	91	41	+50	95	Qualified for the play-offs, then promoted to the National League South (Note: Four teams played for one spot and promotion to the National League South)
3	Hendon	46	25	10	11	96	59	+37	85	Qualified for the play-offs, then transferred to the Southern League Premier Division South
4	Folkestone Invicta	46	25	10	11	104	71	+33	85	Qualified for the play-offs
5	Leiston	46	23	10	13	82	53	+29	79	Qualified for the play-offs, then transferred to the Southern League Premier Division Central
6	Leatherhead	46	24	7	15	68	49	+19	79	
7	Margate	46	20	17	9	77	53	+24	77	
8	Staines Town	46	21	12	13	106	83	+23	75	Transferred to the Southern League Premier Division South
9	Wingate & Finchley	46	20	9	17	63	71	−8	69	
10	Metropolitan Police	46	19	12	15	76	71	+5	66 (Note: Metropolitan Police were deducted 3 points for fielding an ineligible player in their win over Folkestone Invicta on 7 October.)	Transferred to the Southern League Premier Division South
11	Tonbridge Angels	46	19	7	20	58	63	−5	64	
12	Harrow Borough	46	19	6	21	69	76	−7	63	Transferred to the Southern League Premier Division South
13	Kingstonian	46	18	5	23	57	70	−13	59	
14	Dorking Wanderers	46	16	10	20	77	80	−3	58	
15	Thurrock	46	17	6	23	68	79	−11	57	Resigned at the end of the season
16	Worthing	46	15	12	19	71	84	−13	57	
17	Enfield Town	46	14	14	18	72	80	−8	56	
18	Merstham	46	15	11	20	69	80	−11	56	
19	Needham Market	46	13	10	23	65	84	−19	49	Transferred to the Southern League Premier Division Central
20	Brightlingsea Regent	46	13	9	24	67	89	−22	48	
21	Harlow Town	46	13	8	25	55	88	−33	47	
22	Lowestoft Town	46	12	7	27	52	92	−40	43	Transferred to the Southern League Premier Division Central
23	Burgess Hill Town	46	9	9	28	64	102	−38	36	
24	Tooting & Mitcham United	46	9	9	28	52	101	−49	36	Relegated to the South Central Division

Source: official site
Rules for classification: 1) Points; 2) Goal difference; 3) Number of goals scored; 4) Number of matches won; 5) Head-to-head results

==== Top scorers ====
Player	Club	Goals
Elliott Buchanan	Staines Town	39
Jake Robinson	Billericay Town	34
Niko Muir	Hendon	32
Jordan Chiedozie	Margate	29
Mohamed Bettamer	Staines Town	27
Adeoye Yusuff	Folkestone Invicta	27
William Hunt	Brightlingsea Regent	24
Nyren Clunis	Dulwich Hamlet	19
Jake Reed	Leiston	19
Adam Cunnington	Billericay Town	18
James McShane	Dorking Wanderers	16
Alexander Akrofi	Tonbridge Angels	16

==== Play-offs ====
Semi-finals
2	Dulwich Hamlet	1
5	Leiston	0
3	Hendon	4
4	Folkestone Invicta	0

Final
2	Dulwich Hamlet	1 (4)
3	Hendon	1 (3)

==== Semifinals ====
3 May 2018	Hendon	4–0	Folkestone Invicta	Kingsbury
19:30	Walker 6'; Nathaniel-George 16'; Joseph 43'; Muir 44'	Report		Stadium: Silver Jubilee Park; Attendance: 722

3 May 2018	Dulwich Hamlet	1–0	Leiston	Mitcham
19:45	Carew 71'	Report		Stadium: Imperial Fields; Attendance: 1,285

==== Final ====
7 May 2018	Dulwich Hamlet	1–1 (4–3 p)	Hendon	Mitcham
15:00	Tomlin 54'	Report	Nathaniel-George 36'	Stadium: Imperial Fields; Attendance: 3,321

=== Results table ===
Home \ Away	BIL	BRI	BUR	DOW	DUL	ENF	FOL	HAR	HRB	HEN	KIN	LEA	LEI	LOW	MAR	MER	MET	NDH	STA	THU	TON	T&M	W&F	WOR
Billericay Town		4–0	6–1	1–0	1–3	2–1	2–2	2–0	2–0	4–3	0–1	1–0	4–0	5–0	1–1	2–2	3–0	5–0	5–3	1–0	2–1	1–0	2–2	4–0
Brightlingsea Regent	1–1		5–2	2–3	2–2	2–1	1–2	3–1	1–1	2–1	2–0	0–7	0–1	2–0	0–1	1–3	0–1	2–3	2–2	1–3	0–3	0–3	1–0	3–0
Burgess Hill Town	3–4	1–2		1–3	1–1	2–4	1–1	2–0	2–3	2–4	5–1	0–1	2–1	0–5	1–1	0–0	1–4	1–1	1–1	2–5	0–1	3–1	3–1	4–1
Dorking Wanderers	0–1	3–2	2–1		0–1	2–2	5–3	2–2	0–4	0–3	1–3	1–1	0–2	8–0	4–2	4–0	4–1	3–2	1–1	2–0	2–3	2–2	2–2	4–2
Dulwich Hamlet	1–3	2–1	3–2	4–0		1–1	4–3	4–0	2–0	0–1	4–0	4–0	3–0	1–0	1–1	1–2	0–0	2–0	1–1	2–1	1–2	2–1	1–2	3–0
Enfield Town	1–1	2–0	3–2	3–2	3–1		1–1	1–0	3–0	1–0	1–3	0–1	2–2	3–0	2–1	2–2	4–4	0–2	3–4	3–1	0–1	1–1	1–1	0–1
Folkestone Invicta	2–1	3–2	3–1	3–1	0–3	5–1		1–1	1–3	3–2	3–0	3–0	2–0	2–1	1–1	2–1	5–2	0–2	2–0	2–2	3–1	3–1	5–0	1–2
Harlow Town	2–4	2–0	1–1	2–2	2–3	0–2	3–2		2–1	0–3	0–1	2–1	1–0	2–0	1–1	1–2	4–3	1–3	2–4	3–2	2–1	2–1	0–1	3–2
Harrow Borough	0–2	1–2	3–2	3–4	0–1	5–0	0–3	2–1		0–4	2–0	1–2	0–5	6–0	0–4	2–2	3–0	3–2	1–2	2–0	2–0	1–1	3–0	1–0
Hendon	4–1	4–2	2–2	0–0	3–3	3–0	3–3	1–0	6–0		1–3	1–4	2–1	1–1	1–1	3–0	2–0	1–0	3–0	4–1	2–1	4–0	0–1	4–3
Kingstonian	0–2	0–1	0–0	0–0	0–1	4–1	1–1	6–0	0–1	0–0		0–4	1–3	3–2	1–3	2–1	1–2	4–0	3–1	0–1	2–1	0–1	2–1	0–0
Leatherhead	1–1	2–1	2–1	1–0	0–1	2–0	1–2	2–1	0–2	1–2	2–0		2–2	2–1	0–2	2–1	1–0	0–1	2–0	0–2	1–0	2–0	4–0	3–0
Leiston	3–1	3–2	2–0	1–0	2–2	2–0	1–5	0–0	3–0	1–2	2–0	1–2		0–1	2–2	3–1	3–0	2–0	2–2	3–1	2–0	2–0	4–0	2–3
Lowestoft Town	1–2	1–2	1–2	0–0	1–3	3–0	0–2	0–3	1–1	2–1	2–1	3–1	0–2		0–2	1–0	1–3	2–4	2–4	1–0	1–2	0–0	1–1	1–0
Margate	1–2	4–2	2–0	1–0	1–0	1–1	1–3	4–2	1–1	3–2	0–2	0–0	2–2	1–0		0–2	1–1	3–1	2–0	2–0	0–0	3–2	3–4	1–1
Merstham	0–3	3–3	4–2	1–2	0–4	1–1	2–0	2–0	0–1	1–1	1–2	1–1	1–0	6–2	1–2		0–0	2–1	1–5	2–1	0–1	2–2	4–1	0–4
Metropolitan Police	2–2	1–1	2–0	4–1	1–4	1–1	3–1	2–1	1–0	1–2	3–2	1–2	1–1	0–1	2–2	0–3		3–2	4–2	3–1	2–0	2–0	2–0	3–1
Needham Market	1–1	0–3	3–1	2–0	0–3	2–2	2–2	5–1	0–1	3–3	1–2	0–0	2–5	0–2	3–2	1–3	1–1		1–2	2–1	4–2	1–0	0–1	0–2
Staines Town	0–2	2–1	3–1	0–2	1–1	3–2	4–4	4–1	2–1	4–0	5–0	3–0	1–4	3–1	2–2	4–2	1–5	1–1		5–2	3–1	6–0	0–5	3–3
Thurrock	0–5	3–3	4–2	3–2	0–1	3–1	1–2	1–0	2–0	0–1	1–0	2–0	0–0	3–0	0–1	1–1	0–0	1–0	0–2		2–2	4–1	2–4	3–2
Tonbridge Angels	2–1	2–0	0–1	2–0	1–1	1–4	2–3	0–0	2–1	1–0	3–1	0–2	2–1	2–2	0–0	0–1	2–0	5–4	2–1	2–1		1–2	1–0	1–2
Tooting & Mitcham United	2–6	1–1	1–2	1–2	1–3	0–4	0–1	0–1	5–2	0–2	3–2	1–4	0–2	2–5	1–3	3–1	0–2	1–1	0–7	4–1	0–0		2–0	4–3
Wingate & Finchley	1–3	2–1	2–0	2–0	0–0	2–1	2–1	2–0	1–3	2–2	0–1	3–1	0–1	4–3	1–0	3–2	1–0	1–1	0–0	2–4	2–1	1–1		1–0
Worthing	2–1	2–2	2–0	3–1	0–2	2–2	3–2	2–2	2–2	1–2	1–2	1–1	1–1	0–0	0–5	3–2	3–3	1–0	2–2	1–2	2–0	3–0	2–1	

Updated to match(es) played on 28 April 2018. Source:
Legend: Blue = home team win; Yellow = draw; Red = away team win.

=== Stadia and locations ===
Locations of the Premier Division clubs
Greater London Premier Division football clubs

Club	Stadium	Capacity
Billericay Town	New Lodge	3,500
Brightlingsea Regent	North Road	1,000
Burgess Hill Town	Leylands Park	2,500
Dorking Wanderers	Westhumble Community Ground	1,500
Dulwich Hamlet	Champion Hill	3,000
Enfield Town	Queen Elizabeth II Stadium	2,500
Folkestone Invicta	Cheriton Road	4,000
Harrow Borough	Earlsmead Stadium	3,070
Harlow Town	The Harlow Arena	3,500
Hendon	Silver Jubilee Park	1,990
Kingstonian	Fetcham Grove (groundshare with Leatherhead)	3,400
Leatherhead	Fetcham Grove	3,400
Leiston	Victory Road	2,500
Lowestoft Town	Crown Meadow	3,000
Margate	Hartsdown Park	3,000
Merstham	Moatside	2,000
Metropolitan Police	Imber Court	3,000
Needham Market	Bloomfields	4,000
Staines Town	Wheatsheaf Park	3,009
Thurrock	Ship Lane	3,500
Tonbridge Angels	Longmead Stadium	3,000
Tooting & Mitcham United	Imperial Fields	3,500
Wingate & Finchley	The Harry Abrahams Stadium	1,500
Worthing	Woodside Road	4,000

== North Division ==
Isthmian League North Division
- Season: 2017–18
- Champions: AFC Hornchurch
- Promoted: AFC Hornchurch; Potters Bar Town; Haringey Borough
- Relegated: Norwich United
- Matches: 552
- Goals: 1,743 (3.16 per match)
- Top goalscorer: 36 goals - Matthew Price (Heybridge Swifts)
- Total attendance: 86,779
- Average attendance: 157 (+30.8% to previous season)

North Division consisted of 24 clubs: 17 clubs from the previous season, and seven new clubs:

- AFC Sudbury, relegated from the Premier Division
- Barking, promoted from the Essex Senior League
- Canvey Island, relegated from the Premier Division
- Grays Athletic, relegated from the Premier Division
- Hertford Town, promoted from the Spartan South Midlands League
- Mildenhall Town, promoted from the Eastern Counties League
- Potters Bar Town, transferred from Southern League Division One Central

At the end of the season a new step 3 division was created, thus for this season three clubs were to be promoted from each step 4 divisions - champions, runners-up and play-off winners plus one third-placed club with highest points-per-game. Hornchurch won the division and returned to the Premier Division after three seasons in the North Division along with runners-up Potters Bar Town and play-off winners Haringey Borough who never competed at such level. Due to league system restructurisation only one club was relegated from each step 4 division. Norwich United finished bottom of the table and returned to the Eastern Counties League after two seasons in the Isthmian League.

At the end of the season a seventh step 4 division was created under the Isthmian League, as the South Division clubs were distributed between new South East and South Central divisions. Four North Division clubs were transferred to South Central Division. The number of clubs in the step 4 divisions was reduced to 20 for the next season.

=== League table ===
Pos	Team	Pld	W	D	L	GF	GA	GD	Pts	Promotion, qualification or relegation
1	AFC Hornchurch	46	32	7	7	97	35	+62	103	Promoted to the Premier Division
2	Potters Bar Town	46	28	9	9	87	42	+45	90 (Note: Potters Bar Town were deducted 3 points for fielding an ineligible player in their win over Norwich United on 18 November.)	Promoted to the Premier Division
3	Bowers & Pitsea	46	28	5	13	94	48	+46	89	Qualified for the play-offs (Note: Third place at level 8 with highest PPG also automatic promotion to Level 7. 7th placed club qualifies for play-offs if third placed team is promoted to Level 7. Four teams played for one spot and promotion to Level 7.)
4	Haringey Borough	46	27	8	11	84	49	+35	89	Qualified for the play-offs, then promoted to the Premier Division
5	Heybridge Swifts	46	26	9	11	105	53	+52	87	Qualified for the play-offs
6	Canvey Island	46	24	8	14	100	65	+35	80	Qualified for the play-offs
7	Maldon & Tiptree	46	20	9	17	94	83	+11	69	
8	Dereham Town	46	20	11	15	75	63	+12	68 (Note: Dereham Town were deducted 3 points for fielding an ineligible player in their win over AFC Hornchurch on 24 October.)	
9	Bury Town	46	17	14	15	67	65	+2	65	
10	Barking	46	18	10	18	63	63	0	64	
11	Witham Town	46	18	8	20	59	66	−7	62	
12	AFC Sudbury	46	15	14	17	57	66	−9	59	
13	Soham Town Rangers	46	16	10	20	67	73	−6	58	
14	Aveley	46	15	12	19	61	67	−6	57	
15	Hertford Town	46	16	9	21	55	85	−30	57	Transferred to the South Central Division
16	Grays Athletic	46	14	14	18	72	80	−8	56	
17	Tilbury	46	16	8	22	73	95	−22	56	
18	Waltham Abbey	46	13	10	23	73	87	−14	49	Transferred to the South Central Division
19	Cheshunt	46	14	8	24	72	103	−31	49 (Note: Cheshunt were deducted 1 point for fielding an ineligible player in their draw with Soham Town Rangers on 16 January.)	Transferred to the South Central Division
20	Ware	46	13	9	24	49	81	−32	48	Transferred to the South Central Division
21	Brentwood Town	46	12	10	24	71	96	−25	46	
22	Mildenhall Town	46	11	13	22	54	86	−32	46	
23	Romford	46	10	11	25	51	97	−46	41	
24	Norwich United	46	8	16	22	63	95	−32	40	Relegated to the Eastern Counties League

Source: official site
Rules for classification: 1) Points; 2) Goal difference; 3) Number of goals scored; 4) Number of matches won; 5) Head-to-head results

==== Top scorers ====
Player	Club	Goals
Matthew Price	Heybridge Swifts	36
Cemal Ramadan	Bury Town	27
Junior Ogedi-Uzokwe	Maldon & Tiptree	26
George Sykes	Canvey Island	25
Jason Hallett	Cheshunt	25

==== Play-offs ====
Semi-finals
3	Bowers & Pitsea	0
6	Canvey Island	2
4	Haringey Borough	2
5	Heybridge Swifts	0

Final
4	Haringey Borough	3
6	Canvey Island	1

==== Semifinals ====
2 May 2018	Haringey Borough	2–0	Heybridge Swifts	Tottenham
19:45	Djassi -Sambu 21', 70'	Report		Stadium: Coles Park; Attendance: 442

2 May 2018	Bowers & Pitsea	0–2	Canvey Island	Pitsea
19:45		Report	Higgins 31'; Charles 45'	Stadium: Len Salmon Stadium; Attendance: 567

==== Final ====
6 May 2018	Haringey Borough	3–1	Canvey Island	Tottenham
15:00	Kirby 73'; Gabriel 83' (pen.); Ademiluyi 90'	Report	Sheehan 90'	Stadium: Coles Park; Attendance: 809

=== Results table ===
Home \ Away	AFC	SUD	AVE	BAR	BOP	BRE	BUR	CAN	CHE	DER	GRY	HAY	HER	HEY	M&T	MIL	NOR	POT	ROM	SOH	TIL	WAL	WAR	WIT
AFC Hornchurch		1–0	2–1	0–1	1–0	3–4	3–0	1–0	3–1	0–1	2–2	2–1	2–0	1–0	1–0	2–0	1–0	1–0	4–1	3–0	1–1	5–4	1–0	0–1
AFC Sudbury	1–0		1–1	3–1	4–3	3–0	1–1	1–1	3–0	1–4	1–0	1–2	1–1	3–2	1–1	0–2	2–2	0–2	2–1	0–1	3–2	2–0	1–3	1–2
Aveley	0–2	1–1		0–1	1–3	1–0	1–0	3–0	4–1	2–2	1–1	1–3	3–1	0–1	0–5	3–1	1–1	2–2	5–1	2–2	0–2	1–3	0–1	2–1
Barking	1–1	1–0	2–1		2–0	3–3	3–1	1–0	2–3	1–0	3–1	1–2	1–2	0–1	2–1	1–3	3–1	0–3	2–0	0–2	0–1	2–3	1–0	0–2
Bowers & Pitsea	1–0	2–0	2–0	4–0		4–1	4–2	2–1	4–0	3–2	1–0	1–2	1–1	1–2	4–2	3–1	1–3	4–2	4–0	4–0	3–2	2–0	0–2	3–0
Brentwood Town	1–6	2–2	1–2	1–0	1–3		1–2	0–2	1–1	1–1	1–1	2–0	2–2	1–3	2–5	7–1	5–2	2–1	2–1	1–3	3–3	3–1	4–1	1–2
Bury Town	1–4	1–1	0–0	0–0	0–0	2–0		2–1	1–2	0–1	1–1	1–2	4–2	2–1	1–2	2–1	2–2	2–1	1–1	2–1	6–1	0–0	4–2	1–0
Canvey Island	2–0	3–2	3–0	1–1	3–0	5–0	1–0		7–1	4–1	3–0	1–0	2–1	3–0	2–1	1–2	1–4	0–3	1–0	0–3	2–3	3–0	2–2	4–1
Cheshunt	1–1	3–2	2–1	0–4	2–1	2–0	1–2	3–3		0–2	1–0	0–5	5–2	0–1	2–3	3–2	6–3	0–4	2–4	2–2	0–1	4–2	1–3	1–1
Dereham Town	0–0	2–0	2–2	3–3	0–3	2–2	2–0	2–2	1–0		0–1	0–2	3–2	2–1	2–3	3–1	0–0	3–1	2–2	0–2	3–0	2–0	1–2	1–1
Grays Athletic	0–2	3–1	4–2	1–0	1–0	0–1	3–1	3–6	2–2	1–6		3–3	1–1	1–4	2–2	2–2	2–1	1–3	1–2	1–0	3–1	0–4	2–2	4–1
Haringey Borough	1–2	3–0	3–2	1–1	0–2	1–0	4–2	2–0	3–2	2–1	1–1		0–1	3–3	2–2	6–0	4–0	1–2	2–0	2–0	2–0	4–1	2–0	1–0
Hertford Town	0–3	0–1	0–3	2–4	1–0	4–0	0–6	1–0	1–0	0–0	1–0	0–1		0–3	2–3	2–2	1–1	1–1	1–0	0–1	3–2	0–4	2–1	1–1
Heybridge Swifts	0–2	0–1	3–0	3–3	2–0	3–1	1–1	4–1	3–1	1–2	3–3	0–0	6–0		5–0	2–1	3–1	0–0	9–1	2–1	2–1	3–0	6–1	2–1
Maldon & Tiptree	1–2	1–2	3–1	3–1	2–2	4–1	0–2	2–2	0–2	5–1	2–0	3–1	2–3	4–2		1–2	4–1	2–4	1–2	3–1	4–2	1–1	1–1	0–2
Mildenhall Town	0–6	0–1	1–2	0–2	1–1	1–1	0–0	1–3	1–2	0–1	2–1	1–2	2–0	0–2	2–2		0–0	0–0	0–0	2–1	4–6	0–1	1–0	2–0
Norwich United	0–2	3–1	0–3	1–1	1–1	2–1	1–2	4–3	3–1	1–3	2–2	0–2	1–2	1–2	3–3	1–1		0–1	1–1	0–3	3–3	2–0	0–0	1–3
Potters Bar Town	1–2	0–0	0–1	2–0	1–0	2–1	3–0	1–1	2–2	1–0	1–3	2–1	1–0	3–2	3–0	2–0	4–1		2–1	3–1	4–0	3–0	1–0	1–1
Romford	0–6	1–1	1–1	2–1	0–5	3–2	1–2	0–2	1–3	0–2	3–2	1–1	1–4	1–5	4–2	1–1	3–0	0–0		0–1	4–1	1–2	0–2	1–1
Soham Town Rangers	1–2	0–2	1–1	1–1	0–2	1–3	2–2	2–2	2–2	1–4	0–0	3–0	5–0	0–3	1–3	2–2	4–1	1–3	1–1		2–1	3–1	2–3	0–1
Tilbury	2–2	0–0	0–2	1–3	0–3	2–1	1–1	2–6	1–0	2–0	1–2	0–1	1–2	1–0	3–1	2–5	4–4	3–2	3–0	2–0		1–2	2–1	0–3
Waltham Abbey	2–2	2–2	0–1	2–2	0–1	1–1	4–1	1–2	3–2	3–4	2–1	2–3	1–2	3–3	0–1	5–1	1–1	0–3	3–1	1–2	2–2		3–1	2–2
Ware	0–4	1–1	0–0	0–1	2–4	0–2	0–1	1–5	3–1	2–1	0–5	0–0	1–0	0–0	0–1	1–1	1–3	1–4	0–2	2–3	0–2	2–1		3–2
Witham Town	1–6	4–0	1–0	1–0	0–2	2–1	2–2	1–3	3–2	2–0	1–4	2–0	2–3	1–1	1–2	0–1	1–0	1–2	1–0	1–2	0–2	2–0	0–1	

Updated to match(es) played on 28 April 2018. Source:
Legend: Blue = home team win; Yellow = draw; Red = away team win.

=== Stadia and locations ===
Locations of Division One North clubs
Greater London Division One North clubs

Club	Stadium	Capacity
AFC Hornchurch	Hornchurch Stadium	3,500
AFC Sudbury	King's Marsh	2,500
Aveley	Parkside	3,500
Barking	Mayesbrook Park	2,500
Bowers & Pitsea	Len Salmon Stadium	2,000
Brentwood Town	The Brentwood Centre Arena	1,800
Bury Town	Ram Meadow	3,500
Canvey Island	Park Lane	4,500
Cheshunt	Cheshunt Stadium	3,000
Dereham Town	Aldiss Park	3,000
Grays Athletic	Parkside (groundshare with Aveley)	3,500
Haringey Borough	Coles Park	1,500
Hertford Town	Hertingfordbury Park	6,500
Heybridge Swifts	Scraley Road	3,000
Maldon & Tiptree	Wallace Binder Ground	2,000
Mildenhall Town	Recreation Way	2,000
Norwich United	Plantation Park	3,000
Potters Bar Town	Parkfield	2,000
Romford	Ship Lane (groundshare with Thurrock)	3,500
Soham Town Rangers	Julius Martin Lane	2,000
Tilbury	Chadfields	4,000
Waltham Abbey	Capershotts	3,500
Ware	Wodson Park	3,300
Witham Town	Spa Road	2,500

== South Division ==
Isthmian League South Division
- Season: 2017–18
- Champions: Carshalton Athletic
- Promoted: Carshalton Athletic; Lewes; Walton Casuals; Corinthian-Casuals
- Relegated: Shoreham
- Matches: 552
- Goals: 1,880 (3.41 per match)
- Top goalscorer: 35 goals - Jack Barham (Greenwich Borough)
- Total attendance: 111,044
- Average attendance: 201 (-0.5% to previous season)

South Division consisted of 24 clubs: 19 clubs from the previous season, and seven new clubs:

- Ashford United, promoted from the Southern Counties East League
- Phoenix Sports, transferred from Division One North
- Shoreham, promoted from the Southern Combination League
- Thamesmead Town, transferred from Division One North
- VCD Athletic, transferred from Division One North

At the end of the season a new step 3 division was created, thus for this season three clubs were to be promoted from each step 4 divisions - champions, runners-up and play-off winners plus one third-placed club with highest points-per-game. Carshalton Athletic won the division and returned to the Premier Division after four seasons in the South Division along with runners-up Lewes, who spent in the South Division two seasons after the relegation from Premier Division. Play-off winners Walton Casuals were promoted to the Southern League Premier Division South - the highest level they competed in their history. Corinthian-Casuals lost in play-off final but were promoted to the Premier Division as step 4 play-off final loser with highest points-per-game ratio after Thurrock from Premier Division folded. Corinthian-Casuals last competed in top division of the Isthmian League in the 1973–74 season. Due to league system restructurisation only one club was relegated from each step 4 division. Shoreham finished bottom of the table and returned straight back to the Southern Combination League.

At the end of the season a seventh step 4 division was created under the Isthmian League, as the South Division clubs were distributed between new South East and South Central divisions. The number of clubs in the step 4 divisions was reduced to 20 for the next season.

=== League table ===
Pos	Team	Pld	W	D	L	GF	GA	GD	Pts	Promotion, qualification or relegation
1	Carshalton Athletic	46	31	9	6	99	54	+45	102	Promoted to the Premier Division
2	Lewes	46	30	9	7	93	38	+55	99	Promoted to the Premier Division
3	Cray Wanderers	46	25	14	7	112	46	+66	89	Qualified for the play-offs, then placed in the South East Division (Note: Third place at level 8 with highest PPG also automatic promotion to Level 7. 7th placed club qualifies for play-offs if third placed team is promoted to Level 7. Four teams played for one spot and promotion to Level 7.)
4	Greenwich Borough	46	25	12	9	99	47	+52	87	Qualified for the play-offs, then placed in the South East Division
5	Corinthian-Casuals	46	26	9	11	86	47	+39	87 (Note: Corinthian-Casuals were promoted as the Level 8 play-off final loser with the highest PPG, after Thurrock's resignation from the Premier Division.)	Qualified for the play-offs, then promoted to the Premier Division
6	Walton Casuals	46	25	11	10	98	52	+46	86	Qualified for the play-offs, then promoted to the Southern League Premier Division South
7	Hythe Town	46	25	11	10	92	63	+29	86	Placed in the South East Division
8	Whyteleafe	46	20	13	13	87	70	+17	73	Placed in the South East Division
9	Hastings United	46	20	13	13	84	67	+17	73	Placed in the South East Division
10	Thamesmead Town	46	20	12	14	103	81	+22	72	Placed in the South East Division
11	Phoenix Sports	46	20	9	17	79	68	+11	69	Placed in the South East Division
12	Herne Bay	46	21	5	20	81	89	−8	68	Placed in the South East Division
13	South Park	46	19	6	21	79	91	−12	63	Placed in the South Central Division
14	Sittingbourne	46	18	8	20	68	72	−4	62	Placed in the South East Division
15	Horsham	46	16	8	22	71	90	−19	56	Placed in the South East Division
16	Ramsgate	46	15	9	22	79	85	−6	54	Placed in the South East Division
17	VCD Athletic	46	15	7	24	69	91	−22	52	Placed in the South East Division
18	Guernsey	46	13	10	23	65	98	−33	49	Placed in the South East Division
19	Faversham Town	46	13	9	24	61	73	−12	48	Placed in the South East Division
20	Chipstead	46	12	10	24	64	78	−14	46	Placed in the South Central Division
21	Ashford United	46	10	8	28	60	111	−51	38	Placed in the South East Division
22	East Grinstead Town	46	9	9	28	63	128	−65	36	Placed in the South East Division
23	Molesey	46	7	12	27	55	103	−48	30 (Note: Molesey were deducted three points for fielding an ineligible player in their win over East Grinstead Town on 3 October.)	Placed in the South Central Division
24	Shoreham	46	3	5	38	33	138	−105	8 (Note: Shoreham were deducted six points for fielding an ineligible player in two games.)	Relegated to the Southern Combination League

Source: IL official site
Rules for classification: 1) Points; 2) Goal difference; 3) Number of goals scored; 4) Number of matches won; 5) Head-to-head results

==== Top scorers ====
Player	Club	Goals
Jack Barham	Greenwich Borough	35
Josh Kelly	Walton Casuals	28
Jack Mazzone	South Park	27
Jake Embery	Herne Bay	23
Charlie MacDonald	Cray Wanderers	23

==== Play-offs ====
Semi-finals
3	Cray Wanderers	2
6	Walton Casuals	5
4	Greenwich Borough	0
5	Corinthian-Casuals	3

Final
5	Corinthian-Casuals	0 (2)
6	Walton Casuals	0 (4)

==== Semifinals ====
1 May 2018	Cray Wanderers	2–5	Walton Casuals	Bromley
19:45	Rhule 38'; Scott 42'	Report	Hicks 3'; Coleman 56'; Baldwin 65'; Kelly 85'; Sammoutis 90'	Stadium: Hayes Lane; Attendance: 446

1 May 2018	Greenwich Borough	0–3	Corinthian-Casuals	Eltham
19:45		Report	Uzun 23' (pen.); Odunaike 36', 52'	Stadium: Badgers Sports Ground; Attendance: 375

==== Final ====
5 May 2018	Corinthian-Casuals	0–0 (a.e.t.) (2–4 p)	Walton Casuals	Tolworth
15:00		Report		Stadium: King George's Field; Attendance: 930

=== Results table ===
Home \ Away	ASH	CAR	CHI	COR	CRA	EGT	FAV	GRE	GUE	HAS	HER	HOR	HYT	LEW	MOL	PHO	RAM	SHO	SIT	SPK	THA	VCD	WAL	WHY
Ashford United		0–1	3–1	0–1	2–1	1–1	3–1	1–2	3–0	1–3	3–5	1–2	3–3	1–3	0–1	2–3	1–0	3–0	3–1	0–4	4–1	2–5	1–4	1–1
Carshalton Athletic	4–2		2–1	0–0	1–1	5–1	2–1	0–3	0–0	1–1	0–2	2–1	2–1	3–2	5–0	2–2	4–4	4–1	3–0	1–0	2–1	7–0	2–1	4–3
Chipstead	2–3	3–4		1–2	0–1	4–0	1–1	2–2	1–0	1–3	3–0	4–1	2–4	0–1	2–2	2–3	1–1	2–1	1–2	0–2	0–2	3–1	1–1	1–2
Corinthian-Casuals	3–0	2–4	2–3		0–1	3–2	1–0	1–0	5–0	3–2	1–3	2–0	0–0	1–3	4–1	0–2	4–2	2–0	3–1	5–0	2–1	0–1	1–0	0–0
Cray Wanderers	9–1	1–2	0–0	4–2		1–1	4–2	2–2	4–0	1–1	3–1	4–3	4–1	1–2	4–0	3–1	5–1	7–0	3–2	8–0	2–2	4–2	2–2	5–1
East Grinstead Town	3–2	2–0	2–1	0–5	0–7		1–1	2–2	0–2	1–7	3–5	2–2	0–3	0–4	1–1	1–2	1–0	7–2	1–3	0–2	3–3	0–3	0–2	1–8
Faversham Town	1–1	1–2	0–2	0–1	0–0	3–1		2–2	1–2	1–2	0–3	1–2	0–3	2–0	2–1	3–2	1–2	6–1	1–0	2–1	0–0	3–1	0–1	0–2
Greenwich Borough	5–0	1–2	1–0	2–0	0–0	4–1	1–0		4–0	2–2	1–0	0–2	1–2	1–1	4–1	3–0	3–0	4–0	5–1	2–1	1–2	1–3	3–3	1–1
Guernsey	1–1	2–1	2–0	0–1	0–1	4–2	3–1	1–2		1–1	2–4	1–3	1–1	0–3	3–2	1–1	1–4	5–2	3–0	1–3	2–2	4–2	1–3	4–4
Hastings United	2–1	2–0	0–0	2–1	1–1	3–1	1–0	2–5	3–1		2–4	3–3	2–3	1–2	3–0	1–1	4–2	1–0	1–2	2–0	1–2	2–1	1–0	2–1
Herne Bay	3–0	1–2	3–1	1–4	2–1	2–2	3–1	1–0	1–3	0–3		1–1	1–2	0–1	0–0	1–5	3–1	4–1	0–1	4–1	2–3	4–0	1–0	2–1
Horsham	3–0	0–1	1–2	1–4	0–3	1–1	0–3	0–2	2–1	2–2	1–2		2–1	2–1	3–1	2–1	1–4	3–0	1–5	0–0	3–4	3–2	2–4	2–5
Hythe Town	1–0	0–4	5–3	1–1	2–1	3–2	3–0	0–0	5–1	2–2	2–1	1–1		2–0	2–1	1–3	4–1	6–0	3–2	3–2	2–1	2–1	1–2	1–0
Lewes	5–1	0–1	0–0	0–1	2–1	2–0	3–0	2–0	1–0	2–0	8–1	4–2	1–0		3–0	1–0	3–2	4–0	2–2	3–1	2–2	3–0	1–1	1–1
Molesey	1–3	0–0	3–0	1–2	1–1	4–2	2–1	1–6	2–4	4–3	0–0	2–1	1–2	0–4		3–4	1–1	1–2	2–3	3–1	3–3	1–1	1–2	0–0
Phoenix Sports	2–0	1–1	2–2	0–0	0–0	0–1	0–1	0–2	5–0	3–0	3–1	1–0	2–0	2–4	2–2		4–0	4–0	0–1	1–2	2–3	0–3	0–3	2–5
Ramsgate	3–0	0–2	3–0	2–2	1–2	4–0	3–2	1–2	0–0	1–2	2–1	1–0	2–2	2–0	2–1	1–3		3–3	1–1	1–3	2–3	0–1	2–2	4–1
Shoreham	4–2	1–3	0–3	0–3	0–3	2–4	1–1	1–0	0–3	1–1	0–1	1–2	0–3	2–2	1–1	0–2	1–5		0–4	0–4	0–3	0–1	0–2	1–4
Sittingbourne	0–0	3–1	1–1	2–2	0–0	1–2	1–2	1–2	4–0	2–0	3–0	1–3	1–0	0–1	1–0	0–1	2–3	1–0		0–3	2–2	3–2	0–2	2–1
South Park	5–0	2–3	1–3	1–6	0–1	3–1	1–1	1–8	2–1	1–1	1–1	1–3	2–2	0–2	4–1	2–2	2–1	4–2	1–2		2–1	2–0	2–1	3–0
Thamesmead Town	3–1	2–3	1–0	1–1	0–1	4–5	2–3	2–4	5–0	2–4	2–1	5–0	2–1	0–0	3–0	5–2	1–3	4–1	2–2	6–2		2–2	2–1	2–3
VCD Athletic	2–2	1–4	1–3	0–1	0–0	2–1	0–5	0–1	2–2	1–1	2–3	2–1	1–2	1–2	4–0	0–1	3–1	1–0	3–1	1–2	3–1		3–2	3–3
Walton Casuals	4–0	0–1	4–0	0–0	5–2	3–0	4–3	1–1	2–2	2–1	7–0	1–1	2–2	1–2	2–1	3–1	1–0	3–1	3–0	2–1	0–0	3–1		4–2
Whyteleafe	1–1	1–1	2–1	2–1	0–2	2–1	1–1	1–1	2–0	1–0	6–2	0–2	2–2	0–0	2–1	0–1	1–0	2–0	2–1	3–1	1–3	3–0	3–2	

Updated to match(es) played on 28 April 2018. Source:
Legend: Blue = home team win; Yellow = draw; Red = away team win.

=== Stadia and locations ===
Locations of Division One South clubs
Greater London Division One South clubs

Club	Stadium	Capacity
Ashford United	The Homelands	3,200
Carshalton Athletic	War Memorial Sports Ground	5,000
Chipstead	High Road	2,000
Corinthian-Casuals	King George's Field	2,700
Cray Wanderers	Hayes Lane (groundshare with Bromley)	6,000
East Grinstead Town	East Court	1,000
Faversham Town	Salters Lane	2,000
Greenwich Borough	Badgers Sports Ground (groundshare with Cray Valley PM)	1,500
Guernsey	Footes Lane	5,000
Hastings United	The Pilot Field	4,050
Herne Bay	Winch's Field	4,000
Horsham	Gorings Mead	1,500
Hythe Town	Reachfields Stadium	3,000
Lewes	The Dripping Pan	3,000
Molesey	Walton Road Stadium	1,000
Phoenix Sports	Victory Road	2,000
Ramsgate	Southwood Stadium	2,500
Shoreham	Middle Road	2,000
Sittingbourne	Woodstock Park	3,000
South Park	King George's Field	2,000
Thamesmead Town	Princes Park (groundshare with Dartford)	4,100
VCD Athletic	Oakwood	1,180
Walton Casuals	Elmbridge Xcel Sports Hub	2,500
Whyteleafe	Church Road	2,000

== League Cup ==
2017–18 Alan Turvey Trophy
Tournament details
- Country: England
- Teams: 63

Final positions
- Champions: Billericay Town
- Runners-up: Metropolitan Police

Tournament statistics
- Matches played: 62

The 2017–18 Alan Turvey Trophy (formerly the Isthmian League Cup) was the 44th season of the Alan Turvey Trophy, the cup competition of the whole Isthmian League.

=== Calendar ===
Round	Dates	Matches	Clubs
First round	22 August to 27 September	31	63 → 32
Second round	3 October to 22 November	16	32 → 16
Third round	22 November to 30 January	8	16 → 8
Quarterfinals	9 January to 8 March	4	8 → 4
Semifinals	19 February to 13 March	2	4 → 2
Final	12 April	1	2 → 1

The Isthmian League Cup was voluntary this season, nine clubs decided not to take part in the competition:

- Cray Wanderers
- Dereham Town
- Guernsey
- Hastings United
- Lewes
- Lowestoft Town
- Needham Market
- Norwich United
- Thurrock

=== First round ===
Sixty two clubs participated in the first round, while one club received a bye to the second round:

- Hendon

Tie	Home team (tier)	Score	Away team (tier)	Att.
1	Harrow Borough (P)	1–3	Metropolitan Police (P)	122
2	Wingate & Finchley (P)	3–0	Haringey Borough (N)	78
3	Canvey Island (N)	0–1	Brentwood Town (N)	238
4	South Park (S)	3–1	Molesey (S)	51
5	Tonbridge Angels (P)	10–1	Herne Bay (S)	180
6	Thamesmead Town (S)	4–3	Phoenix Sports (S)	59
7	Ashford United (S)	0–2	Greenwich Borough (S)	142
8	Carshalton Athletic (S)	1–3	Dorking Wanderers (P)	113
9	AFC Hornchurch (N)	5–1	Aveley (N)	98
10	AFC Sudbury (N)	5–1	Brightlingsea Regent (P)	113
11	Bowers & Pitsea (N)	0–2	Grays Athletic (N)	113
12	Cheshunt (N)	2–0	Waltham Abbey (N)	108
13	Chipstead (S)	5–0	Leatherhead (P)	89
14	Faversham Town (S)	2–5	Hythe Town (S)	97
15	Harlow Town (P)	1–1	Bury Town (N)	113
Bury Town advance 4–3 on penalties
16	Maldon & Tiptree (N)	1–1	Leiston (P)	77
Maldon & Tiptree advance 5–4 on penalties
17	Margate (P)	2–1	East Grinstead Town (S)	196

Tie	Home team (tier)	Score	Away team (tier)	Att.
18	Shoreham (S)	4–1	Worthing (P)	142
19	Soham Town Rangers (N)	0–0	Witham Town (N)	93
Soham Town Rangers advance 9–8 on penalties
20	Staines Town (P)	1–1	Dulwich Hamlet (P)	125
Dulwich Hamlet advance 4–2 on penalties
21	Tooting & Mitcham United (P)	1–1	Merstham (P)	74
Merstham advance 4–3 on penalties
22	Walton Casuals (S)	2–1	Kingstonian (P)	157
23	Whyteleafe (S)	1–2	Corinthian-Casuals (S)	77
24	Romford (N)	1–1	Tilbury (N)	53
Romford advance 5–3 on penalties
25	Billericay Town (P)	5–1	Barking (N)	518
26	Enfield Town (P)	1–1	Hertford Town (N)	178
Enfield Town advance 9–8 on penalties
27	Potters Bar Town (N)	4–1	Ware (N)	63
28	Sittingbourne (S)	2–0	Ramsgate (S)	104
29	VCD Athletic (S)	0–3	Folkestone Invicta (P)	47
30	Horsham (S)	4–2	Burgess Hill Town (P)	83
31	Heybridge Swifts	4–2	Mildenhall Town (N)	108

=== Second round ===
Thirty clubs to have made it through the first round were entered into the draw with two clubs who get a bye, making thirty-two teams.

Tie	Home team (tier)	Score	Away team (tier)	Att.
32	Sittingbourne (S)	1–0	Merstham (P)	126
33	Wingate & Finchley (P)	2–1	Potters Bar Town	60
34	Bury Town (N)	0–0	Heybridge Swifts	179
Heybridge Swifts advance 5–4 on penalties
35	Margate (P)	2–2	Corinthian-Casuals (S)	253
Corinthian-Casuals advance 5–3 on penalties
36	Soham Town Rangers (N)	2–3	Brentwood Town (N)	88
37	South Park (S)	2–5	Chipstead (S)	68
38	Romford (N)	2–1	AFC Hornchurch (N)	105
39	Dulwich Hamlet (P)	4–1	Greenwich Borough (S)	444

Tie	Home team (tier)	Score	Away team (tier)	Att.
40	Tonbridge Angels (P)	0–0	Hythe Town (S)	173
Hythe Town advance 5–3 on penalties
41	Maldon & Tiptree (N)	0–3	Billericay Town (P)	336
42	Cheshunt (N)	1–4	Enfield Town (P)	199
43	Hendon (P)	5–1	Grays Athletic (N)	65
44	Folkestone Invicta (P)	1–2	Metropolitan Police (P)	141
45	Shoreham (S)	0–4	Dorking Wanderers (P)	70
Dorking Wanderers removed, Shoreham reinstalled
46	Walton Casuals (S)	3–0	Horsham (S)	70
47	Thamesmead Town (S)	3–2	AFC Sudbury (N)	67

=== Third round ===
Tie	Home team (tier)	Score	Away team (tier)	Att.
48	Billericay Town (P)	1–1	Heybridge Swifts	355
Billericay Town advance 5–3 on penalties
49	Wingate & Finchley (P)	3–2	Sittingbourne (S)	71
50	Hythe Town (S)	1–2	Hendon (P)	121
51	Metropolitan Police (P)	4–2	Romford (N)	28

Tie	Home team (tier)	Score	Away team (tier)	Att.
52	Enfield Town (P)	4–3	Chipstead (S)	125
53	Thamesmead Town (S)	1–1	Corinthian-Casuals (S)	56
Corinthian-Casuals advance 5–3 on penalties
54	Shoreham (S)	2–3	Brentwood Town (N)	52
55	Dulwich Hamlet (P)	–	Walton Casuals (S)	
Walton Casuals removed, Dulwich Hamlet get a bye

=== Quarterfinals ===
Tie	Home team (tier)	Score	Away team (tier)	Att.
56	Hendon (P)	1–3	Corinthian-Casuals (S)	93
57	Wingate & Finchley (P)	0–1	Billericay Town (P)	172

Tie	Home team (tier)	Score	Away team (tier)	Att.
58	Metropolitan Police (P)	2–1	Enfield Town (P)	66
59	Brentwood Town (N)	0–1	Dulwich Hamlet (P)	119

=== Semifinals ===
Tie	Home team (tier)	Score	Away team (tier)	Att.
60	Billericay Town (P)	3–1	Corinthian-Casuals (S)	442
61	Dulwich Hamlet (P)	0–0	Metropolitan Police (P)	210
Metropolitan Police advance 4–1 on penalties

=== Final ===
11 April 2018 62	Billericay Town (P)	5–3 (a.e.t.)	Metropolitan Police (P)	Parkside, Aveley
19:30	Robinson 11'; Bricknell 86', 86', 96'; Waldren 99'	Isthmian League report	Bird 25'; Wright 57'; Hickey 59'	Attendance: 626

== Awards ==
=== Premier Division ===
Month	Manager of the Month		Goalkeeper of the Month		Performance of the Month	References
Month	Manager	Club	Player	Club	Performance of the Month	References
August	Harry Wheeler & Glenn Tamplin	Billericay Town	Tom Lovelock	Hendon	Hendon	
August	Harry Wheeler & Glenn Tamplin	Billericay Town	Zaki Oualah	Leatherhead	Hendon	
August	Harry Wheeler & Glenn Tamplin	Billericay Town	Lenny Pidgeley	Margate	Hendon	
September	Harry Wheeler & Glenn Tamplin	Billericay Town	Alan Julian	Billericay Town	Burgess Hill Town	
October	Gavin Rose	Dulwich Hamlet	Preston Edwards	Dulwich Hamlet	Folkestone Invicta	
November	Neil Cugley	Folkestone Invicta	Alan Julian	Billericay Town	Hendon	
December	Harry Wheeler & Glenn Tamplin	Billericay Town	Zaki Oualah	Leatherhead	Hendon	
January	Harry Wheeler & Glenn Tamplin	Billericay Town	Thomas Williams	Metropolitan Police	Billericay Town	
February	Richard Wilkins	Needham Market	Melvin Minter	Harrow Borough	Leiston	
March	Gavin Rose	Dulwich Hamlet	Marcus Garnham	Leiston	Staines Town	
March	Neil Cugley	Folkestone Invicta	Marcus Garnham	Leiston	Staines Town	
April	Harry Wheeler	Billericay Town	Rob Tolfrey	Kingstonian	Dorking Wanderers	

=== North Division ===
Month	Manager of the Month		Goalkeeper of the Month		Performance of the Month	References
Month	Manager	Club	Player	Club	Club	References
August	Jim McFarlane / Jody Brown	AFC Hornchurch / Heybridge Swifts	Elliot Pride	Dereham Town	Heybridge Swifts	
September	Tom Loizou	Haringey Borough	Valery Pajetat	Haringey Borough	Haringey Borough	
October	Neal Simmons	Dereham Town	Elliot Pride	Dereham Town	Mildenhall Town	
November	Justin Gardner	Barking	Ollie Bowles	Barking	Heybridge Swifts	
December	Rob Small	Bowers & Pitsea	Callum Chafer	Bowers & Pitsea	Norwich United	
January	Steve Ringrose	Potters Bar Town	Elliot Pride	Dereham Town	Brentwood Town	
February	James Webster	Aveley	Valery Pajetat	Haringey Borough	Heybridge Swifts	
March	Steve Ringrose	Potters Bar Town	Sam Mott	AFC Hornchurch	Brentwood Town	
April	Tom Loizou	Haringey Borough	Berkley Laurencin	Potters Bar Town	Romford	

=== South Division ===
Month	Manager of the Month		Goalkeeper of the Month		Performance of the Month	References
Month	Manager	Club	Player	Club	Club	References
August	Anthony Gale	Walton Casuals	Nick Blue	Cray Wanderers	Thamesmead Town	
September	James Bracken	Corinthian-Casuals	Danny Bracken	Corinthian-Casuals	Faversham Town	
October	Gary Alexander	Greenwich Borough	Harry Brooks	Sittingbourne	Lewes	
October	Gary Alexander	Greenwich Borough	Darren Hawkes	Sittingbourne	Lewes	
November	Peter Adeniyi	Carshalton Athletic	Chris Winterton	Lewes	Carshalton Athletic	
December	Anthony Gale	Walton Casuals	George Kamurasi	Greenwich Borough	Ramsgate	
January	Peter Adeniyi	Carshalton Athletic	George Kamurasi	Greenwich Borough	Cray Wanderers	
February	John Scarborough & Paul Dale	Whyteleafe	Danny Bracken	Corinthian-Casuals	Ashford United	
March	Paul Barnes	Greenwich Borough	Danny Bracken	Corinthian-Casuals	East Grinstead Town	
April	Sam Denly	Hythe Town	Billy Bishop	Carshalton Athletic	Walton Casuals	

== See also ==
- Isthmian League
- 2017–18 Northern Premier League
- 2017–18 Southern League
