= 1971–72 Essex Senior Football League =

The 1971–72 season was the first in the history of Essex Senior Football League, a football competition in England.

The league was formed by nine clubs.

- Clubs joined from the Essex and Suffolk Border League:
  - Heybridge Swifts
  - Tiptree United
  - Witham Town
- Clubs joined from the Herts Senior County League:
  - Saffron Walden Town
  - Stansted
- Plus:
  - Basildon United, joined from the Greater London League
  - Billericay Town, joined from the Essex Olympian League
  - Pegasus Athletic
  - Southend United 'A'

== League table ==
Essex Senior Football League
- Season: 1971–72
- Champions: Witham Town
- Matches: 72
- Goals: 232 (3.22 per match)

Pos	Team	Pld	W	D	L	GF	GA	GD	Pts	Promotion or relegation
1	Witham Town	16	11	3	2	38	11	+27	25	
2	Billericay Town	16	11	2	3	30	13	+17	24	
3	Pegasus Athletic	16	8	5	3	39	16	+23	21	
4	Tiptree United	16	9	1	6	21	19	+2	19	
5	Saffron Walden Town	16	8	0	8	27	25	+2	16	
6	Basildon United	16	7	2	7	22	21	+1	16	
7	Heybridge Swifts	16	5	6	5	26	27	−1	16	
8	Southend United 'A'	16	1	3	12	18	45	−27	2 (Note: Southend United 'A' were deducted three points.)	Resigned from the league
9	Stansted	16	1	0	15	11	55	−44	2	

Source: fchd
Rules for classification: 1) points; 2) goal difference; 3) number of goals scored.
