= Pegasus Athletic F.C. =

Pegasus Athletic
- Full name: Pegasus Athletic Football Club
- Dissolved: 1972; 53 years ago
- Ground: Southend Stadium, Southend-on-Sea
- Manager: Ernie Shepherd
- Final season; 1971–72: Essex Senior League, 3rd of 9
Home colours

Pegasus Athletic Football Club was a football club based in south Essex, England.

== History ==
Founded in the 1960s, as a works team for Mobil, the club, initially named Pegasus (Coryton), won the Essex Intermediate Cup in the 1969–70 season, beating Hornchurch Reserves 2–0 in the final. Under this guise, Pegasus Athletic competed in the Basildon Football League and the Greater London League.

In 1971, the club, now renamed to Pegasus Athletic, joined the Essex Senior League, becoming founder members of the league. In the 1971–72 season, they finished third place out of nine clubs, once again winning the Essex Intermediate Cup at the end of the season, beating Colchester-based club Eastern Gas in the final. However, in the following season, they resigned from the league after playing only one match, losing 11–1 against Tiptree United on 2 September 1972. Their record was expunged. Pegasus' last game came against Barkingside in a 15–2 loss in the FA Amateur Cup on 9 September 1972.

Following the club resigning from the Essex Senior League, they competed in Sunday league football.

== Ground ==
Originally playing in Coryton, near Thurrock, at the Pegasus Club on Herd Lane, the club later moved to the Southend Stadium, former home of Southend United between 1934 and 1955, upon joining the Essex Senior League. During the final days of the club, Pegasus Athletic attempted to relocate to Chelmsford, with a view of taking up tenancy of Melbourne Stadium, however the club were unsuccessful in their efforts.
