= Matt Jones (footballer, born 1970) =

English footballer

Personal information
- Full name: Matthew Leon Jones
- Date of birth: 9 October 1970 (age 56)
- Place of birth: Chiswick, England
- Position: Winger

Youth career
- Arsenal
- Southend United

Senior career*
Years	Team	Apps	(Gls)
1988–1990	Southend United	5	(0)
1990–1993	Chelmsford City		
1993–1998	Heybridge Swifts		
1998–1999	St Albans City		
1999–2002	Dagenham & Redbridge		
2002–2003	Canvey Island		
2003–2004	Chelmsford City		

Managerial career
- 2006–2007: Billericay Town
- * Club domestic league appearances and goals

Matthew Leon Jones OBE (born 9 October 1970) is an English former footballer who played as a winger. He was awarded an OBE in 2020 for services to education.

== Club career ==
Jones began his senior career with Southend United in 1988, making five Football League appearances for the club, before moving to Chelmsford City in 1990. After three years at Chelmsford, Jones moved to Heybridge Swifts. In 1998, Jones joined former Heybridge manager Garry Hill at St Albans City. In 1999, Hill and Jones moved to Dagenham & Redbridge. On 29 May 2003, Jones signed for Canvey Island, after making in excess of 100 appearances at Dagenham. For the 2003–04 season, Jones re-signed for Chelmsford City, ten years after leaving the club.

== Managerial career ==
In January 2006, Jones was appointed manager of Billericay Town. In 2007, Jones guided the club to the FA Cup first round for the third time in the club's history, setting up a tie with Swansea City. In November 2007, Jones was sacked as Billericay manager following a run of four straight league defeats.

== Outside football ==
Jones is currently headteacher at Ark Globe Academy in Southwark.
