= Billericay Town F.C. =

Association football club in England

Coordinates: 51°37′18″N 0°24′12″E

Billericay Town
- Full name: Billericay Town Football Club
- Nicknames: Ricay, The Blues
- Founded: 1880
- Ground: New Lodge, Billericay
- Chairman: Dave McCartney & Nick Hutt
- Manager: Danny Scopes
- League: National League South
- 2025–26: Isthmian League Premier Division, 3rd of 22 (promoted via play-offs)
- Website: billericaytownfc.co.uk
Home colours	Away colours

Billericay Town Football Club is a semi-professional football club based in Billericay, Essex, England. The club are currently members of the National League South, the sixth tier of English football, and play at New Lodge. They are the second most successful club in FA Vase history, having won the competition on three occasions.

== History ==
The club was established as Billericay Football Club in 1880. They joined the Romford & District League in 1890, where the club played until World War I. They also started playing in the Mid-Essex League, winning Division Two in 1912–13, 1931–32 and 1932–33. The club remained in the Mid-Essex League until joining the Southern Essex Combination League in 1947. In 1946 they adopted their current name. In 1966 the club were founder members of the Essex Olympian League. The 1969–70 season saw them win the league and League Cup double, a feat they repeated the following season. Following their back-to-back titles, the club became founder members of the Essex Senior League in 1971, finishing as runners-up in its first season and winning the title in 1972–73.

After finishing as runners-up again, Billericay won back-to-back league titles in 1974–75 and 1975–76. The latter season also saw them reach the final of the FA Vase and beat Stamford 1–0 at Wembley, as well as a first Essex Senior Cup title when they beat Epping Town 3–2 in the final. Although they only finished third in 1976–77, they retained the FA Vase, beating Sheffield 2–1 in a replay at the City Ground in Nottingham after a 1–1 draw at Wembley. In 1977 the club switched to the Athenian League, which they won at the first attempt. The 1978–79 season saw them retain their Athenian League title and win a third FA Vase in four seasons, beating Almondsbury Greenway 4–1 in the final, with Doug Young becoming the only player to score a hat-trick in an FA Vase final at the old Wembley. The following season saw them move up to Division Two of the Isthmian League, which they also won at the first attempt, earning promotion to Division One.

Billericay's success continued in 1980–81 as they finished as runners-up in Division One and were promoted to the Premier Division, the first time back-to-back promotions had been achieved in the league by a new club. The club remained in the Premier Division until being relegated to Division One at the end of the 1985–86 season. This began a spell as a yo-yo club, as they were relegated to Division Two North at the end of the 1988–89 season. The club were placed in Division Two in 1991 after league restructuring, before being promoted back to Division One in 1992–93 and then to the Premier Division in 1997–98 after finishing as Division One runners-up. The 1997–98 season also saw them reach the first round of the FA Cup for the first time, losing 3–2 at home to fellow non-League club Wisbech Town.

In 2004–05 Billericay reached the first round of the FA Cup again, losing 1–0 at home to Stevenage Borough. They also finished as Premier Division runners-up, qualifying for the promotion play-offs. However, the club were beaten 2–0 at home by Leyton in the semi-finals. A fourth-place finish in 2006–07 saw them qualify for the play-offs again, this time beating local rivals Chelmsford City 5–3 on penalties in the semi-finals after a 1–1 draw, before losing 4–2 on penalties to Bromley in the final following another 1–1 draw. In 2007–08 they qualified for the first round of the FA Cup again, losing 2–1 at home to Swansea City.

In 2010–11 Billericay won the Essex Senior Cup for a second time, beating Aveley 2–0 in the final. The following season saw the club win the Premier Division, earning promotion to the Conference South. However, they were relegated back to the Isthmian League the following season after finishing second-from-bottom of the Conference South. In December 2016 the club was taken over by Glenn Tamplin, who funded several high-profile signings including Jamie O'Hara, Jermaine Pennant and Paul Konchesky. They won the Isthmian League Cup in 2016–17, beating Tonbridge Angels 8–3 in the final. The club reached the first round of the FA Cup for a fourth time in 2017–18, drawing 1–1 at Leatherhead in the first match and losing the replay 3–1. The season also saw them retain the League Cup, beating Metropolitan Police 5–3 in the final, as well as winning the Premier Division title, earning promotion to the National League South. Tamplin announced that he was leaving the club in September 2019.

Another FA Cup first round appearance in 2018–19 saw Billericay lose 3–1 at home to Chesterfield in a replay. The club finished bottom of the National League South in 2021–22 and were relegated to the Premier Division of the Isthmian League. In 2024–25 they were runners-up in the Premier Division, before losing 2–1 to Dover Athletic in their play-off semi-final. The club finished third in the Premier Division the following season, going on to beat Chatham Town 3–2 in the play-off semi-finals and Brentwood Town 2–1 in the final to secure promotion back to the National League South.

== Ground ==
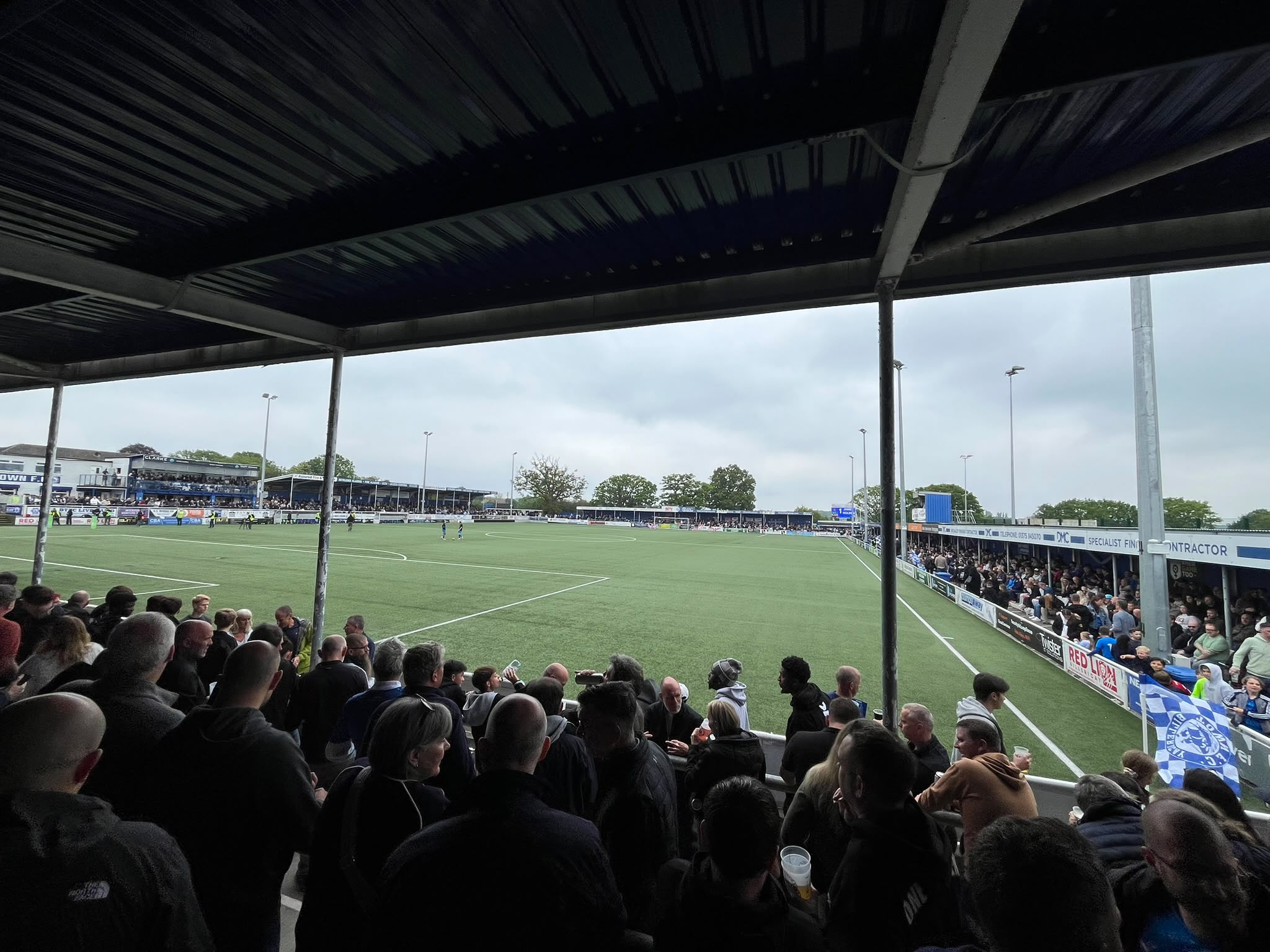
New Lodge during the Isthmian League Premier Division play-off final in 2026

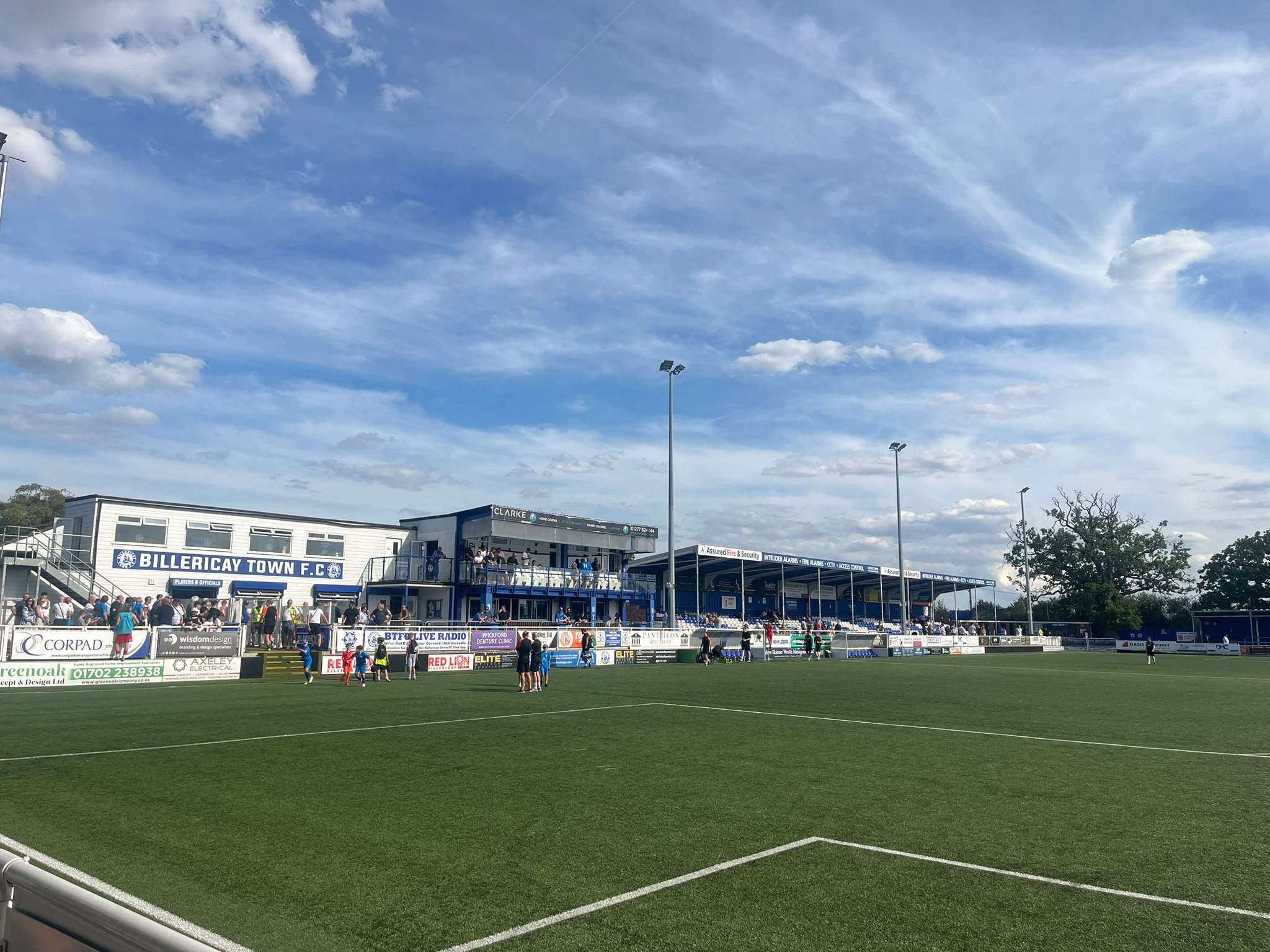
The Clubhouse and Glenn Tamplin Stand

Archer Hall became the club's permanent home ground during the 1930s, although it remained an unenclosed pitch. In 1970 the club moved to New Lodge, which had previously been a sports ground used by Outwell Common Football Club. The ground was enclosed using a loan from Basildon Borough Council and Charrington Brewery and dressing rooms and a clubhouse were built. During the 1970s a covered standing area was built on the clubhouse side of the pitch, which became known as the Cowshed. Temporary seated stands loaned from Essex County Cricket Club were later installed on the other side of the pitch. In 1977 the club won a set of floodlights by winning the Philips Electrical Floodlight Competition final against Friar Lane Old Boys, a six-a-side tournament played at the Crystal Palace National Sports Centre the day after their FA Vase final against Sheffield. The floodlights were inaugurated with a friendly match against West Ham United, which attracted a then-record crowd of 3,841.

In 1980 a permanent 120-seat stand was built between the Cowshed and the clubhouse; its shape led to it becoming known as the Pacman stand. During the 1980s a 200-seat stand was built on the side that had previously hosted the temporary seating, with the supporters club erecting several small areas of terracing. In 1995 Billericay bought two stands that had been in use at Newbury Town's Faraday Road ground after the club went bust. One was installed next to the Cowshed and the other at the Blunts Wall End, with seats later installed in the Blunts Wall End stand. The new stand adjacent to the Cowshed was soon moved to the other end of the pitch. An area of covered terracing was added alongside the 200-seat stand. Chelmsford City groundshared at New Lodge between 1998 and 2005. In 2002 the club announced plans to move to a new 4,000-capacity stadium at Gloucester Park. However, the relocation was scrapped by new chairman Steve Kent in 2004. By the summer of 2017 the ground had a capacity of 3,500, of which 424 was seated and 2,000 was covered.

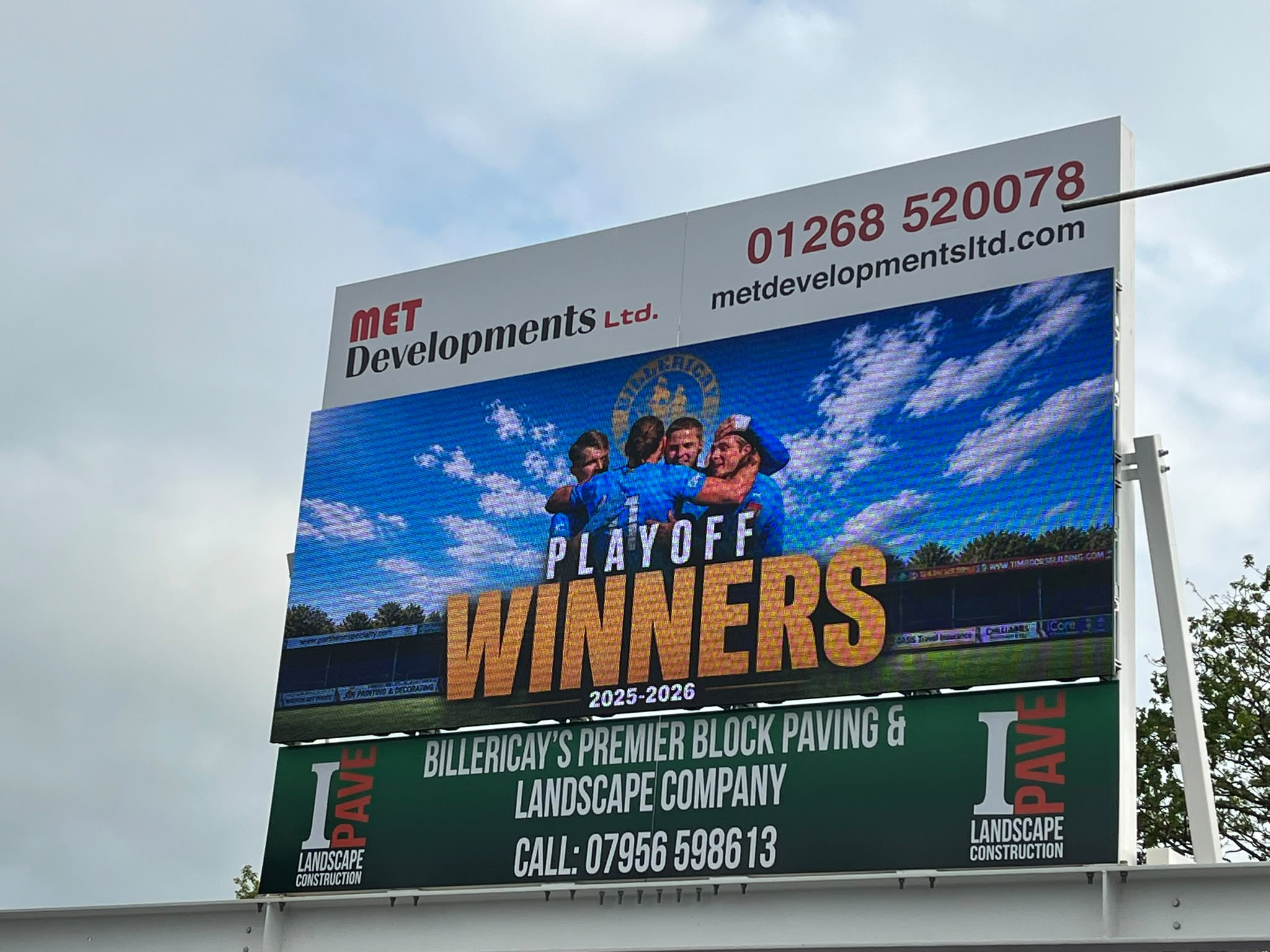
Scoreboard after Billericay won the Isthmian League Premier Division play-off final in 2026

In the summer of 2017 New Lodge was completely redeveloped. Covered terraces were built at both ends of the ground covering the full width of the pitch; a new seated stand was built next to the clubhouse where the Pacman stand and Cowshed had previously been located, and was named the Harry Parker Stand. On the other side of the pitch the seating was extended to the full length of the pitch. The ground's capacity was raised to 5,000 with 2,000 seated. A friendly match against West Ham on 8 August 2017 attracted a record crowd of 4,582.

In 2023 the Harry Parker Stand was renamed the Glenn Tamplin Stand. During the 2025–26 season a new digital scoreboard was installed between the Blunts Wall Road end and the Family Stand.

== Current squad ==
As of 15 November 2026

Note: Flags indicate national team as defined under FIFA eligibility rules; some limited exceptions apply. Players may hold more than one non-FIFA nationality.

No.	Pos.	Nation	Player
1	GK	ENG	Joe Wright
2	DF	ENG	George Wind
3	DF	ENG	Jay Porter
4	MF	ESP	Odei Martin Sorondo
5	DF	ENG	Louis Lomas
6	DF	ENG	Ryan Scott (captain)
7	FW	ENG	Seb Ferdinand
8	MF	ENG	Taylor Clark
9	FW	ENG	Frankie Merrifield
10	MF	ENG	Jon Benton
12	DF	ENG	Paul Appiah
13	GK	ENG	Charlie Brown
14	MF	ENG	Elliot Long

No.	Pos.	Nation	Player
15	DF	ENG	Ollie Parsons
16	MF	ENG	Callum Watts
17	FW	ENG	Nico Valentine
18	FW	ZIM	Macauley Bonne
20	MF	ENG	Charlie Ruff
21	DF	ENG	Joseph Johnson
22	MF	WAL	Callum Tripp
23	FW	ENG	Jamie Mauge (on loan from Ipswich Town)
24	MF	ENG	Siju Odelusi
—	GK	ENG	Freddie Strang
—	GK	ENG	Finley Woodham (on loan from Charlton Athletic)
—	GK	ENG	Khari Ranson (on loan from Arsenal)
—	GK	ENG	Jamie Grossart (dual signed from Sittingbourne F.C.)

=== Out on loan ===
Note: Flags indicate national team as defined under FIFA eligibility rules; some limited exceptions apply. Players may hold more than one non-FIFA nationality.

No.	Pos.	Nation	Player
—	FW	ENG	Daniel Izekor (on dual registration with Ilford F.C.)
—	DF	ENG	Jack Williams (on dual registration with Hullbridge Sports F.C.)
—	GK	ENG	Stefan Lemacq (on joint contract with Hutton F.C.)
—	FW	ENG	Sherquan Stephan Toussaint (on dual registration with Stanway Rovers F.C.)
—	FW	ENG	Charlie Panton (on dual registration with Canvey Island F.C.)
—	FW	ENG	Luca Savill (on joint contract with Hutton F.C.)
—	FW	AUS	Matty Macarthur (dual signed with Dartford F.C.)

== Coaching staff ==
Position	Staff
Manager	(England) Danny Scopes
Assistant Manager	(England) Craig Shipman
Head of Recruitment	(England) Adam Drew
First-team Coach	(England) Ash Goss
Head of Medical	(England) Arron Benstead
Kit Man	(England) Darran Leech
General Dogsbody	(England) Evan Marlow

== Managers ==
Statistics are correct as of 11 May 2022. All first team matches are counted.

Name	Nationality	From	To	P	W	D	L	GF	GA	GD	Win %	Honours	Ref
Roy Hamm		2 September 1967	15 May 1968	36	13	9	14	58	66	−8	36.11	1967-68 Murrell Cup winners	
Don Hills		21 August 1968	24 May 1969	40	16	5	19	73	78	−5	40.00	1968-69 Murrell Cup winners	
John Newman		30 August 1969	18 November 1978	400	300	52	48	962	287	675	75.00	1969-70 Murrell Cup winners 1969-70 Essex Olympian League champions 1970-71 Kershaw Challenge Cup winners 1970-71 Essex Olympian League Cup winners 1970-71 Essex Olympian League champions 1971-72 Essex Olympian League Challenge Cup (shared); 1971-72 Essex Senior League runners-up 1971-72 Essex Senior League Challenge Cup winners 1972-73 Essex Senior League Champions; 1972-73 Essex Senior League Cup winners 1972-73 Essex Senior League Challenge Cup winners 1973-74 Essex Senior League runners-Up; 1973-74 Essex Senior League Challenge Cup winners 1974-75 Essex Senior League champions 1974-75 Essex Senior League Cup runners-up 1974-75 J. T. Clark Memorial Trophy winners 1975-76 Essex Senior League champions 1975-76 F.A. Vase winners 1975-76 Essex Senior Cup winners 1975-76 J. T. Clark Memorial Trophy winners 1976-77 F.A. Vase winners 1976-77 Essex Senior League Cup winners 1976-77 J. T. Clark Memorial Trophy winners 1977-78 Athenian League champions 1977-78 Athenian League Cup winners 1977-78 Essex Senior Trophy winners 1977-78 J. T. Clark Memorial Trophy winners	
Colin Searle; Arthur Coughlan		25 November 1978	30 December 1978	7	6	1	0	21	5	16	85.71		
Colin Searle		20 January 1979	21 May 1979	27	18	4	5	55	23	32	66.67	1978-79 F.A. Vase winners 1978-79 Athenian League champions	
Paddy Betson		18 August 1979	15 April 1980	50	40	5	5	122	33	89	80.00	1979-80 J. T. Clark Memorial Trophy winners 1979-80 Essex Senior Trophy winners	
Steve Bone		19 August 1980	8 May 1980	5	4	0	1	16	5	11	80.00	1979-80 East Anglian Cup runners-up 1979-80 Isthmian League Division Two champions	
John Newman; Steve Bone		19 August 1980	8 May 1980	58	36	9	13	99	60	39	62.07	1980-81 Isthmian League Division One runners-up	
Andy McDermid		15 August 1981	12 Apr 1983	109	42	28	39	159	138	19	38.53		
Micky Pincott		15 August 1981	12 Apr 1983	7	3	1	3	7	9	−2	42.86		
Dave Emerick		20 August 1983	14 April 1984	51	17	10	24	63	85	−22	33.33		
Peter Burton		24 August 1984	8 August 1987	222	74	53	95	341	376	−35	33.33	1984-85 East Anglian Cup runners-up 1985-86 Essex Senior Cup runners-up 1986-87 Essex Thameside Trophy champions	
Brian Moffatt		12 August 1987	18 Nov 1989	75	31	17	27	113	95	18	41.33		
John Kendall (Note: Kendall was caretaker manager for ten matches before being appointed as manager.)		21 November 1989	1 May 1999	544	263	110	171	898	710	188	48.35	1990-91 Essex Thameside Trophy runners-Up; 1991-92 Essex Thameside Trophy champions 1993-94 Essex Senior Cup runners-Up; 1994-95 Essex Senior Cup runners-Up; 1995-96 Essex Senior Cup runners-Up	
Gary Calder		14 August 1999	30 May 2003	227	100	58	69	340	287	53	44.05		
Justin Edinburgh	England	16 August 2003	2 January 2006	142	56	34	52	215	176	39	39.44		
Matt Jones	England	7 January 2006	24 November 2007	107	50	27	30	189	130	49	46.73	2005-06 Eastern Floodlit League champions 2006-07 Isthmian League Premier Division Play-Off runners-up	
Jason Broom; Grant Gordon		28 November 2007	28 March 2009	73	30	17	26	118	117	1	41.10		
Grant Gordon; Lee Hodges	England	28 March 2009	18 April 2009	6	2	3	1	9	7	2	33.33		
Brian Statham	England	25 April 2009	10 March 2010	49	16	15	18	60	59	1	32.65		
John Mifsud		5 April 2010	20 April 2010	6	4	0	2	7	3	4	66.67		
Craig Edwards		24 April 2010	2 March 2017	367	163	83	121	601	498	103	44.41	2010-11 Essex Senior Cup winners 2011-12 Isthmian League Premier Division champions 2014-15 Essex Senior Cup runners-up	
Glenn Tamplin; Justin Gardner	England	2 March 2017	14 June 2017	11	7	0	4	29	15	14	63.64	2016-17 Isthmian League Cup champions	
Harry Wheeler		24 February 2018	26 August 2018	25	14	6	5	54	33	21	56.00	2017-18 Essex Senior Cup winners 2017-18 Isthmian League Cup winners 2017-18 Isthmian League Premier Division champions	
Glenn Tamplin; Danny Hazle	England	26 August 2018	18 September 2018	4	2	1	1	7	5	2	50.00		
Dean Brennan	Ireland	18 September 2018	16 January 2019	26	13	5	8	59	41	18	50.00		
Harry Wheeler		18 January 2019	13 September 2019	27	12	5	10	46	44	2	46.30		
Jamie O'Hara	England	13 September 2019	3 December 2020	41	12	13	16	67	78	−11	29.27	2019-20 Essex Senior Cup finalists (not played)	
Dan Brown; Ronnie Henry	England	7 December 2020	9 January 2021	4	1	1	2	5	6	−1	25.00		
Kevin Watson	England	10 January 2021	5 October 2021	13	2	3	8	20	32	−12	15.38		
Dan Brown (Note: Brown took charge for an Essex Senior Cup match on 7 December 2021.)		5 October 2021	11 October 2021	2	2	0	0	3	1	2	100.00		
Jody Brown		11 October 2021	18 April 2022	34	10	9	15	37	51	−14	29.41	2021-22 Essex Senior Cup winners	
Dan Brown		18 April 2022	7 May 2022	4	2	0	2	5	5	0	50.00		
Dan Brown		12 May 2022	23 April 23	52	24	9	19	88	77	11	46.15		
Gary McCann		26 April 2023	7 September 2025	114	65	21	28	227	130	97	57.02	2024-25 Isthmian League Cup winners	
Danny Scopes	England	8 September 2025	Present	50	31	9	10	94	57	37	62.00	2025–26 Essex Senior Cup winners 2025-26 Isthmian League Premier Division Play-Off winners	

== Honours ==
- Isthmian League
  - Premier Division champions 2011–12, 2017–18
  - Premier Division play-offs 2025–26
  - Division Two champions 1979–80
  - League Cup winners 2016–17, 2017–18, 2024–25
- FA Vase
  - Winners 1975–76, 1976–77, 1978–79
- Athenian League
  - Champions 1977–78
  - League Cup winners 1977–78
- Essex Senior League
  - Champions 1972–73, 1974–75, 1975–76
  - League Cup winners 1971–72, 1972–73, 1973–74, 1976–77
- Essex Olympian League
  - Champions 1969–70, 1970–71
  - Senior Division Cup winners 1970–71
  - Challenge Cup winners 1970–71, 1971–72 (shared)
- Mid-Essex League
  - Division Two champions 1912–13, 1931–32, 1932–33
  - Division Two League Cup winners 1930–31, 1932–33
- Chelmsford & District League
  - Division Three champions 1932–33
- Essex Senior Cup
  - Winners 1975–76, 2010–11, 2017–18, 2021–22, 2025–26
- Essex Senior Trophy
  - Winners 1977–78, 1979–80
- Essex Thameside Trophy
  - Winners 1986–87, 1991–92
- JT Clark Memorial Trophy
  - Winners 1975, 1976, 1977, 1978, 1979
- Phillips Electrical Floodlight Trophy
  - Winners 1976–77

== Records ==
- Best FA Cup performance: First round, 1997–98, 2004–05, 2007–08, 2017–18, 2018–19, 2019–20
- Best FA Trophy performance: Quarter-finals, 2017–18
- Best FA Vase performance: Winners, 1975–76, 1976–77, 1978–79
- Biggest victory:
  - 15–1 vs Cullis Athletic, Brentwood & District League, 9 December 1939
  - 14–0 vs Laindon Corinthians, Romford & District League, Division 1, 23 November 1946
- Heaviest defeat: 0–11:
  - vs Southminster St. Leonards, Wickford & District League, 11 April 1908
  - vs Great Waltham, Chelmsford & District League Division Two, 16 February 1929
- Record attendance: 4,582 vs West Ham United XI, 8 August 2017
- Lowest attendance: 54 vs Wembley, Isthmian League Division One, 5 December 1995
- Most appearances: John Pullin, 418
- Most goals: Fred Clayden, 273
- Most goals in a season: Jake Robinson, 57 (2017–18)
- Most goals in a match: 5:
  - Harry Welham in a 9–0 win vs Broomfield, Chelmsford & District League Division Two, 16 September 1911
  - Stewart in a 14–0 win against Laindon Corinthians, Romford & District League Division 1, 23 November 1946
  - Ray Speller in a 13–0 win at Elm Park, Romford & District League Division 1, 19 April 1947
  - Morgan in 7–0 win at Roneo Athletic, Romford & District League Premier Division, 8 April 1949
  - Reg Whittaker in a 10–0 win vs Dagenham Dock, Romford & District League Premier Division, 11 February 1950
  - Fred Clayden in a 7–1 win vs Dunmow, Essex Olympian League, 10 January 1970
- Longest unbeaten run (all competitions): 28 matches, 13 October 1979 – 1 March 1980
- Longest unbeaten league run: 39 matches, 21 April 1979 – 15 March 1980, Athenian League
- Consecutive defeats: 6
  - 22 March 2003 – 8 April 2003, Isthmian League Premier Division
  - 6 April 2013 – 23 April 2013, Conference South
  - 23 October 2021 – 20 November 2021, National League South
- Record transfer fee received: £22,500+ from West Ham United for Steve Jones, 1992
- Record transfer fee paid: £27,600 to Maidenhead United for Dean Inman, October 2017

== See also ==
- Billericay Town F.C. players
- Billericay Town F.C. managers
- Billericay Town F.C. Women
