= Glenn Tamplin =

English businessman (born 1972)

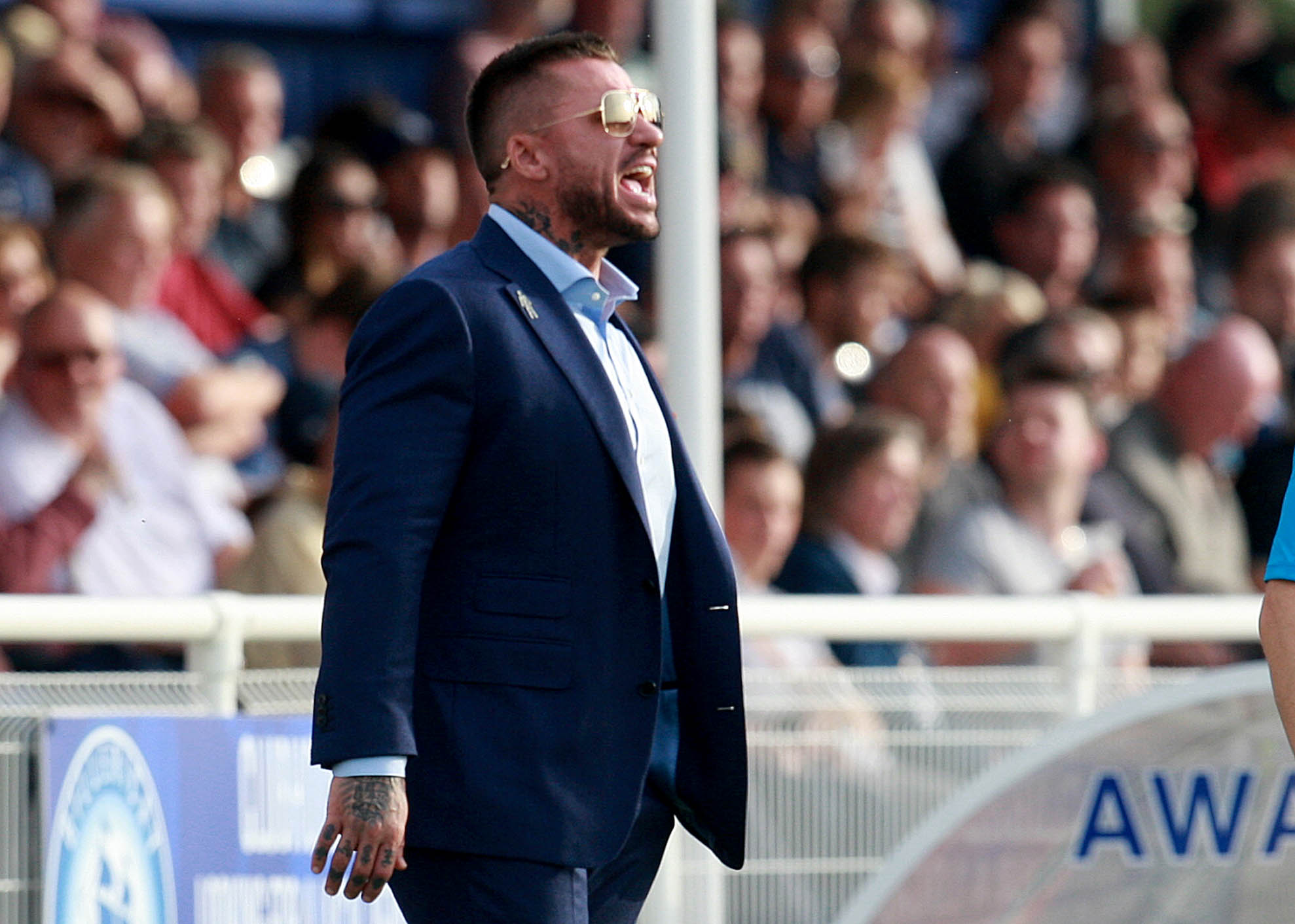
- Tamplin managing Billericay Town
- Born: Glenn David Thomas; 14 January 1972 (age 54); Dagenham, England
- Occupations: Entrepreneur; investor
- Known for: Owner of Billericay Town F.C. (2016–2019); Owner of Romford F.C. (2019–2021)
- Spouse: Bliss Tamplin (m. 2015)
- Children: 6
Association football career
Youth career
- West Ham United
- Leyton Orient
Senior career*
Years	Team	Apps	(Gls)
- Barkingside
- Barking
Managerial career
- 2017–2018: Billericay Town
- 2019–2021: Romford
- * Club domestic league appearances and goals

Glenn David Tamplin (born 14 January 1972) is an English businessman, investor and former football club owner and manager. Tamplin became known for his time at Billericay Town, of which he was the co-owner, director and manager. He is also the principal owner of AGP Steel.

== Early life and personal life ==
Tamplin was born and raised in Dagenham by his mother and his stepfather. He was briefly reunited with his biological father at the age of thirteen, when his parents decided to rekindle their relationship. This only lasted two weeks, and Tamplin has been estranged from his father ever since. He had a younger sister who died at the age of three (Tamplin said she died of sudden infant death syndrome, but due to her age, it is likely it was sudden unexplained death in childhood).

Tamplin became a keen follower of football when growing up, and by the age of eleven, he was playing district and county football, as well as for the academies of West Ham United and Leyton Orient. At the age of fourteen, he joined Orient, but was released six months later. Following this, he continued playing district and county football, but gave up his dreams of playing professionally. He played semi-professionally for Barkingside, while working for Rainham Steel. He later played for Barking.

Tamplin has three children with his wife Bliss, who he married in 2015. He has three other children from a previous relationship. Tamplin is a Christian.

In 2017, he ranked second in the Essex Power 100 list, being named the second most powerful person in Essex.

In July 2018, Tamplin said that Muay Thai had helped him recover from unspecified addictions.

== Involvement in football ==
=== Billericay Town ===
In November 2016, a Tamplin-led consortium had withdrawn their bid to take over Dagenham & Redbridge, after the board of directors removed their support for the offer. In December 2016, Tamplin purchased non-league football team Billericay Town; the initial acquisition which was widely reported was followed by the signings of former star professionals Paul Konchesky, Jamie O'Hara and Jermaine Pennant. Tamplin invested over £2,000,000 in the club for improvements and a new pitch. Tamplin showed the unique murals and changes of the changing rooms to Sky Sports, along with match rituals. In the 2017–18 season, Tamplin assumed the manager's position at the club and guided them to the first round of the FA Cup.

On 24 February 2018, Tamplin sacked himself as manager of the club, following three straight league defeats to Leiston, Folkestone Invicta and Wealdstone, and a disagreement with his players after asking them to give up a week's wages following the poor run. However, he rehired himself just two days later. On 4 April, for the second time in two months, Tamplin announced via an interview on YouTube, entitled "Understanding me – Glenn Tamplin", that he would again resign his post as manager. On 2 September, Tamplin released a statement via the official Billericay Town website that the club were now up for sale, citing two incidents where he was reported to police for alleged drug abuse (which he said were unfounded) and had led to the police questioning him about the allegations in front of members of his family. Tamplin stated that he could "take the personal abuse but now it has started to affect my health and my family. For me it has now crossed the line."

On 18 September 2019, Billericay Town announced Tamplin had stepped down as owner and director of the club.

=== Romford ===
In November 2019, Tamplin joined Romford, immediately sacking manager Paul Martin and appointing himself in place. On 4 March 2021, as result of the COVID-19 pandemic, Romford announced that Tamplin had left the club.

== Philanthropy ==
In April 2017, Tamplin donated £45,000 to the family of Harry Parker, a 7-year-old with cerebral palsy.

In October 2017, it was reported that Tamplin had given two homeless men jobs after seeing them on his regular commute to work. Later that month, however, one of the new employees stole from the club grounds, with Tamplin publishing CCTV footage of the incident on his Twitter account.

== Legal issues ==
In September 2016, Tamplin was fined a total of £45,000 and ordered to pay £30,789 in court costs after Manns Waste Management Limited illegally dumped more than 6,000 tonnes of controlled waste on the grounds of his home. The court found Tamplin acted "negligently to a high degree" in committing the offences and the buried household and commercial waste could have interfered with nearby flood defences on the River Roding.

In December 2017, Tamplin was banned from driving for six-months having been caught speeding excessively on multiple occasions.

In December 2023, Tamplin was wanted by Hertfordshire Police for failing to turn up in court in relation to allegations of cocaine possession and breaching a community order.

In February 2018, Tamplin was under police investigation after alleged "gangster threats" were made by him to Billericay Town footballer Elliot Kebbie.
