= Imran Kayani =

English-born Pakistani footballer

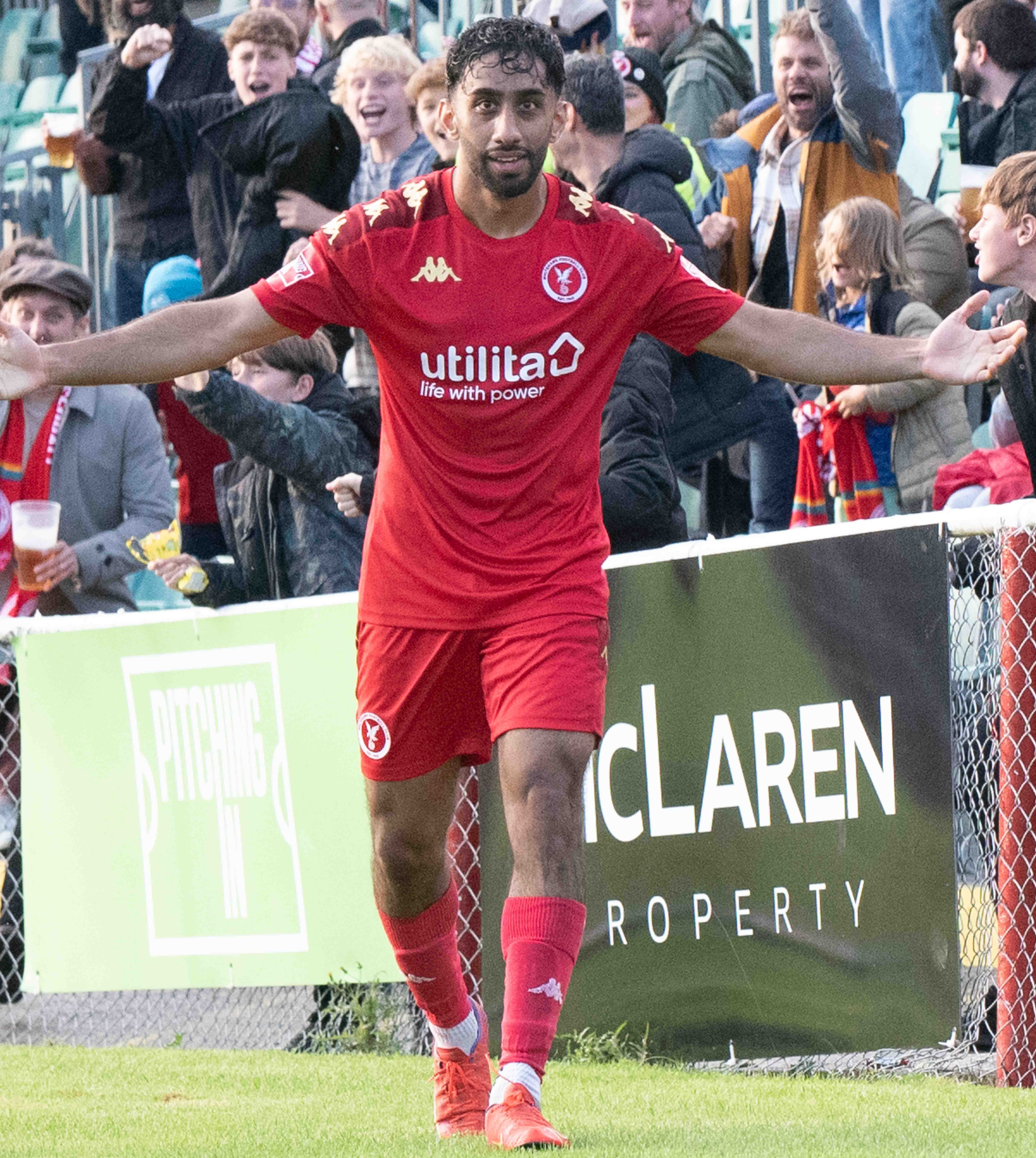
- Kayani playing for Whitehawk in 2023

Personal information
- Full name: Imran Shahid Kayani
- Date of birth: 24 December 2001 (age 24)
- Place of birth: Chertsey, England
- Height: 5 ft 11 in (1.80 m)
- Position: Forward

Team information
- Current team: Whitehawk

Youth career
- 2020–2021: Sutton United

Senior career*
Years	Team	Apps	(Gls)
2020–2021	Sutton United	0	(0)
2020	→ Bedfont Sports (loan)	0	(0)
2021	Bedfont Sports	1	(0)
2021–2023	Slough Town	41	(5)
2021–2022	→ Kings Langley (loan)	2	(0)
2022–2023	→ Hartley Wintney (loan)	5	(0)
2023	→ Kingstonian (loan)	7	(3)
2023	→ Hanwell Town (loan)	3	(1)
2023	Dover Athletic	2	(0)
2023–2024	Whitehawk	36	(11)
2024	Cray Wanderers	5	(0)
2024	Westfield	7	(2)
2024–2025	Whitehawk	23	(1)
2025	Whitehawk	2	(0)
2025–2026	Kingstonian	9	(1)
2026	Westfield	7	(1)
2026-	Whitehawk	12	(0)

International career^{‡}
2023–	Pakistan	7	(0)
- * Club domestic league appearances and goals as of 16:58 5 November 2026 (UTC) ‡ National team caps and goals as of 23:00, 25 March 2025 (UTC)

Imran Shahid Kayani (Urdu: عمران شاہد کیانی; born 24 December 2001) is a professional footballer who plays as a forward for Isthmian League Premier Division club Whitehawk. Born in England, he represents the Pakistan national team.

== Club career ==
Kayani started as a youth playing for Chelsea Elite from the age of 11 to 16. He also represented the Surrey county, through which Royal Russell offered him a scholarship where he was able to train full time alongside getting his A levels. During this time, he was also selected to represent England Schoolboys where he scored on his debut against Wales. Kayani is also listed among the graduates of AF Global Football, a football development organisation.

Upon the completion of his scholarship, Kayani signed for Sutton United youth academy in August 2020. Kayani gained his first-team experience on loan at Bedfont Sports at the Isthmian League South Central Division, who he also played for in July 2021.

Kayani joined the under-23 side of National League South club Slough Town in August 2021. He made 26 appearances for the club first team in the 2021–22 season, scoring four times. He also scored a hat-trick against Hartley Wintney's U23 while playing for Slough Town under-23 team. In December 2021, Kayani joined Southern Football League side Kings Lanley on loan. In October 2022, Kayani was loaned to Hartley Wintney, whom he grabbed the club attention when he previously scored a hat trick against them. In February 2023, Kayani joined Isthmian League side Kingstonian on a 28-day loan. After his short stint at Kingstonian, Kayani joined Hanwell Town. He scored on his debut against Swindon Supermarine in a 1–3 home defeat.

In June 2023, Kayani signed for Dover Athletic following his departure from Slough Town.

After his short spell at Dover Athletic, Kayani signed for Isthmian League side Whitehawk in September 2023. He scored on his home debut in a 4–0 victory against Redhill at the 2023–24 FA Cup qualifying rounds. He scored 4 goals in his first three matches. Throughout his stay, Kayani had played 46 times for the Hawks, and scoring fourteen goals, including a hat trick in a four-one win at Kingstonian.

In September 2024, Kayani moved to Isthmian League side Cray Wanderers, where he made thirteen total appearances. On 2 November 2024, Kayani moved Isthmian League South Central Division club Westfield based in Surrey, playing eight games and scoring twice.

On 13 December 2024, Kayani returned to Whitehawk, along with former teammate Rob O'Toole.

After being without a club at the start of the 2025-26 season, Kayani re-signed for Whitehawk in September 2025, but left the club the following month, joining Kingstonian.

In March 2026 he re-joined Westfield, before re-signing for the third time with Whitehawk for the start of the 2026-2027 season.

== International career ==
In August 2023, Kayani declared his intention to play for Pakistan as it is his country of heritage. Three months later in November 2023, Kayani was called up by the Pakistan national team for the second round of the FIFA World Cup qualifiers. He made his international debut on 16 November 2023 as a substitute against Saudi Arabia in their 4–0 away defeat.

== Personal life ==
Kayani's family originate from the city of Rawalpindi in Pakistan. He enrolled in Queen Mary University of London in 2021 to complete his bachelor in Computer Science.

== Career statistics ==
=== Club ===
As of match played 3 May 2026

Appearances and goals by club, season and competition
Club	Season	League			FA Cup		League Cup		Other		Total	
Club	Season	Division	Apps	Goals	Apps	Goals	Apps	Goals	Apps	Goals	Apps	Goals
Sutton United	2020–21	National League	0	0	0	0	0	0	0	0	0	0
Bedfont Sports (loan)	2020–21	Isthmian League South Central Division	0	0	1	0	—		0	0	1	0
Bedfont Sports	2021–22	Isthmian League South Central Division	1	0	0	0	—		0	0	1	0
Slough Town	2021–22	National League South	16	2	0	0	—		2 (Note: One appearance and one goal in Berks & Bucks Senior Cup, one appearance in FA Trophy)	1	18	3
Slough Town	2022–23	National League South	25	3	1	0	—		1 (Note: Appearance(s) in Berks & Bucks Senior Cup)	0	27	3
Slough Town	Total		41	5	1	0	0	0	3	1	45	6
Kings Langley (loan)	2021–22	SFL Premier Division South	2	0	0	0	—		0	0	2	0
Hartley Wintney (loan)	2022–23	SFL Premier Division South	5	0	0	0	—		1 (Note: Appearance(s) in FA Trophy)	0	6	0
Kingstonian (loan)	2022–23	Isthmian League Premier Division	7	3	0	0	—		0	0	7	3
Hanwell Town (loan)	2022–23	SFL Premier Division South	3	1	0	0	—		1 (Note: Appearance(s) in Middlesex Senior Charity Cup)	0	4	1
Dover Athletic	2023–24	National League South	2	0	0	0	—		0	0	2	0
Whitehawk	2023–24	Isthmian League Premier Division	32	11	2	1	—		8 (Note: Two appearances and two goals in Sussex Senior Challenge Cup, three appearances in FA Trophy, three appearances in Alan Turvey Trophy)	2	42	14
Whitehawk	2024–25	Isthmian League Premier Division	4	0	0	0	—		0	0	4	0
Whitehawk	Total		36	11	2	1	—		8	2	46	14
Cray Wanderers	2024–25	Isthmian League Premier Division	5	0	6	0	—		2 (Note: One appearance in Kent Senior Cup, one in FA Trophy)	0	13	0
Westfield	2024–25	Isthmian League South Central Division	7	2	0	0	—		1 (Note: Appearance(s) in Alan Turvey Trophy)	0	8	2
Whitehawk	2024–25	Isthmian League Premier Division	20	1	0	0	—		0	0	20	1
Whitehawk	2025–26	Isthmian League Premier Division	3	0	1	0	—		1	0	5	0
Whitehawk	Total		23	1	1	0	—		1	0	25	1
Kingstonian	2025–26	Isthmian League South Central Division	9	1	0	0	—		1 (Note: Appearance(s) in Surrey Senior Cup)	0	10	1
Westfield	2025–26	Isthmian League South Central Division	7	1	0	0	—		3 (Note: Appearance(s) in Isthmian League South Central Division play-offs and Aldershot Senior Cup)	1	10	2
Career total			149	25	11	1	0	0	20	4	180	30

=== International ===
As of match played 25 March 2025

Appearances and goals by national team and year
National team	Year	Apps	Goals
Pakistan	2023	2	0
Pakistan	2024	4	0
Pakistan	2025	1	0
Total		7	0

== See also ==
- British Asians in association football
- List of Pakistan international footballers born outside Pakistan
