= 2024–25 Isthmian League =

The 2024–25 season was the 110th season of the Isthmian League, which is an English football competition featuring semi-professional and amateur clubs from London, East and South East England. The league operates four divisions, the Premier Division at Step 3 and three divisions, North, South Central and South East at Step 4 of the National League System. This was the sixth season since the former South Division was subdivided into the South Central and South East divisions. The league is also known as the Pitching In League under a sponsorship deal with Entain, formerly GVC Holdings.

The allocations for steps 3 and 4 were announced by The Football Association (FA) on 17 May 2024.

== Premier Division ==
Isthmian League Premier Division
- Season: 2024–25
- Champions: Horsham
- Promoted: Horsham; Dover Athletic
- Relegated: Bowers & Pitsea; Bognor Regis Town; Hastings United; Hendon
- Matches: 462
- Goals: 1,415 (3.06 per match)
- Top goalscorer: Jimmy Wild (25 goals)
- Biggest home win: Hendon 9–0 Hastings United (23 November 2024)
- Biggest away win: Potters Bar Town 0–8 Dover Athletic (10 August 2024)
- Highest scoring: Hendon 9–0 Hastings United (23 November 2024)
- Highest attendance: 3,342; Billericay Town vs Cheshunt (26 April 2025)
- Lowest attendance: 101; Hashtag United vs Wingate & Finchley (30 November 2024)

The Premier Division comprised sixteen teams from the previous season, as well as six clubs who newly joined the division.

=== Team changes ===
To the Premier Division

Promoted from the North Division

- Bowers & Pitsea

Promoted from the South East Division

- Chichester City
- Cray Valley Paper Mills

Relegated from the National League South

- Dartford
- Dover Athletic

Transferred from the Southern Football League Premier Division South

- Hendon

From the Premier Division

Promoted to the National League South

- Enfield Town
- Hornchurch

Relegated to the North Division

- Concord Rangers
- Haringey Borough

Relegated to the South Central Division

- Kingstonian

Relegated to the South East Division

- Margate

=== Premier Division table ===
Pos	Team	Pld	W	D	L	GF	GA	GD	Pts	Promotion, qualification or relegation
1	Horsham (C, P)	42	28	3	11	82	40	+42	87	Promotion to the National League South
2	Billericay Town	42	26	9	7	83	42	+41	87	Qualification for the play-offs
3	Dartford	42	25	9	8	77	49	+28	84	Qualification for the play-offs
4	Cray Valley Paper Mills	42	23	11	8	80	56	+24	77 (Note: Cray Valley Paper Mills were deducted three points.)	Qualification for the play-offs
5	Dover Athletic (O, P)	42	23	7	12	83	48	+35	76	Qualification for the play-offs
6	Chichester City	42	22	7	13	72	59	+13	73	
7	Carshalton Athletic	42	20	10	12	72	54	+18	70	
8	Hashtag United	42	18	10	14	82	71	+11	64	
9	Chatham Town	42	17	12	13	74	53	+21	63	
10	Cray Wanderers	42	18	7	17	58	52	+6	61	
11	Wingate & Finchley	42	17	9	16	76	67	+9	60	
12	Folkestone Invicta	42	17	7	18	61	66	−5	58	
13	Lewes	42	15	13	14	59	64	−5	58	
14	Potters Bar Town	42	17	6	19	57	75	−18	57	
15	Cheshunt	42	14	7	21	61	69	−8	49	
16	Whitehawk	42	14	7	21	49	66	−17	49	
17	Canvey Island	42	13	5	24	48	66	−18	44	
18	Dulwich Hamlet	42	12	8	22	58	80	−22	44	
19	Hendon (R)	42	9	12	21	61	79	−18	39	Relegation to South Central Division
20	Hastings United (R)	42	8	10	24	37	75	−38	34	Relegation to South East Division
21	Bognor Regis Town (R)	42	8	8	26	51	100	−49	32	Relegation to South Central Division
22	Bowers & Pitsea (R)	42	7	5	30	34	84	−50	26	Relegation to North Division

Source: Isthmian League
Rules for classification: 1) points; 2) goal difference; 3) number of goals scored; 4) number of matches won; 5) head-to-head results
(C) Champions; (O) Play-off winners; (P) Promoted; (R) Relegated

=== Play-offs ===
Semi-finals
2	Billericay Town	1
5	Dover Athletic	2
3	Dartford	4
4	Cray Valley Paper Mills	3

Final
3	Dartford	0
5	Dover Athletic	2

==== Semifinals ====
30 April	Billericay Town	1–2 (a.e.t.)	Dover Athletic	Billericay
19:45	Akinwande 95'	Report	Matthews 97', 119'	Stadium: New Lodge; Attendance: 2,857

30 April	Dartford	4–3 (a.e.t.)	Cray Valley Paper Mills	Dartford
19:45	Carruthers 70'; Odaudu 90+8'; Bullas 95'; Whitefield 103'	Report	Waldren 7', 48'; Coombes 118'	Stadium: Princes Park; Attendance: 2,002

==== Final ====
5 May	Dartford	0–2	Dover Athletic	Dartford
15:00		Report	Soares-Junior 57' (pen.); Matthews 87'	Stadium: Princes Park; Attendance: 3,805

=== Results table ===
Home \ Away	BIL	BOG	B&P	CAN	CAR	CHA	CHE	CHI	CVP	CRA	DAR	DOV	DUL	FOL	HSH	HAS	HEN	HOR	LEW	POT	WHI	W&F
Billericay Town		4–0	2–1	3–0	3–2	1–1	4–2	1–2	2–1	0–2	4–0	1–1	2–0	2–0	2–1	1–1	1–0	2–1	4–2	1–0	3–0	1–3
Bognor Regis Town	0–3		1–0	1–2	1–1	1–7	0–4	1–4	2–3	3–1	0–2	1–2	1–0	1–2	2–2	0–1	2–2	1–3	0–1	1–0	2–3	2–1
Bowers & Pitsea	1–4	0–1		1–2	0–3	0–2	1–1	2–1	1–2	0–1	1–3	0–2	4–1	2–2	2–2	0–2	1–0	0–1	0–2	2–0	0–1	0–6
Canvey Island	0–3	0–4	2–0		1–0	1–0	0–1	2–3	4–4	2–0	0–1	0–0	2–3	0–1	1–2	1–0	1–1	0–1	4–0	1–2	2–1	2–3
Carshalton Athletic	4–3	4–4	6–1	2–1		2–0	1–1	1–2	1–2	2–1	0–1	1–1	5–1	2–1	1–0	2–1	2–2	0–3	0–0	2–1	2–2	3–2
Chatham Town	1–1	1–1	3–1	1–3	3–0		4–1	0–1	0–1	1–4	0–2	1–1	3–1	4–1	0–1	2–0	2–2	2–0	1–1	2–2	5–0	3–1
Cheshunt	1–1	3–2	1–0	0–1	0–1	0–1		2–3	4–4	0–1	3–0	1–2	1–1	1–0	3–4	2–1	2–2	1–2	1–2	0–1	1–4	3–1
Chichester City	3–1	2–1	1–0	2–1	1–3	2–0	4–0		2–2	2–1	2–2	1–3	0–0	2–1	0–4	2–3	1–0	1–1	3–0	1–2	1–1	2–1
Cray Valley Paper Mills	1–1	4–0	2–0	2–0	1–0	3–3	4–2	2–1		2–1	1–2	2–1	3–1	1–2	1–5	1–1	1–1	1–0	0–0	2–2	3–0	5–3
Cray Wanderers	1–1	1–1	4–0	3–1	1–1	1–4	2–1	1–0	0–2		2–2	1–2	1–0	3–2	3–0	0–0	1–0	0–0	1–3	1–0	0–0	4–1
Dartford	4–0	4–0	1–2	2–0	1–4	3–1	2–1	0–0	0–0	2–1		3–1	2–2	2–2	2–0	2–0	0–0	2–1	2–0	0–1	4–1	2–3
Dover Athletic	0–1	1–0	2–0	3–2	1–3	0–1	2–1	5–2	2–2	0–1	5–1		1–0	2–3	4–2	1–1	4–2	1–2	1–1	3–0	0–2	1–2
Dulwich Hamlet	0–1	3–4	3–0	2–1	1–0	2–2	0–1	1–2	2–4	2–1	0–3	1–4		2–1	0–2	3–0	2–1	5–2	1–3	3–1	3–3	2–1
Folkestone Invicta	0–3	4–1	0–2	4–2	1–1	1–3	0–4	1–3	0–1	1–0	0–1	0–1	2–1		1–1	3–1	2–0	3–0	2–1	1–1	1–0	3–2
Hashtag United	1–2	4–2	1–1	1–3	0–1	0–1	1–0	2–1	1–3	0–2	3–3	2–1	3–3	5–3		4–0	3–2	1–4	2–1	4–1	2–1	4–1
Hastings United	1–5	2–2	2–4	1–1	1–1	3–2	2–3	0–2	0–1	1–2	0–3	0–2	0–0	1–2	0–0		2–0	2–0	0–1	2–3	2–0	0–2
Hendon	1–4	5–1	2–1	0–1	0–3	3–3	2–0	2–1	1–0	3–1	2–3	0–3	3–0	0–2	3–3	9–0		0–4	0–0	0–4	3–0	1–6
Horsham	1–0	2–1	5–0	1–0	3–0	1–1	3–1	2–1	2–1	3–0	1–3	1–3	3–0	0–1	5–1	1–0	1–0		2–0	3–2	5–0	1–2
Lewes	2–2	4–1	1–1	2–1	1–3	2–0	2–2	2–3	4–1	4–3	3–1	1–3	2–2	0–0	2–1	1–1	1–0	0–2		2–3	2–1	0–0
Potters Bar Town	0–2	1–1	1–0	1–0	0–1	1–0	1–2	4–3	0–2	0–4	1–1	0–8	0–1	3–2	1–5	2–0	5–1	0–6	5–0		3–2	0–0
Whitehawk	0–0	3–0	2–1	4–0	2–0	0–2	0–2	0–1	2–0	2–0	0–1	0–2	2–1	1–0	1–1	0–1	2–2	1–2	2–1	2–0		0–2
Wingate & Finchley	0–1	4–1	3–1	0–0	2–1	1–1	0–1	1–1	0–2	1–0	1–2	2–1	3–2	3–3	1–1	2–1	3–3	0–1	2–2	1–2	3–1	

Source: Football Web Pages
Legend: Blue = home team win; Yellow = draw; Red = away team win.

=== Stadiums and locations ===
Locations of the Premier Division clubs
Greater London Premier Division football clubs

Club	Location	Stadium	Capacity
Billericay Town	Billericay	New Lodge	3,500
Bognor Regis Town	Bognor Regis	Nyewood Lane	4,500
Bowers & Pitsea	Pitsea	Len Salmon Stadium	3,500
Canvey Island	Canvey Island	Park Lane	4,500
Carshalton Athletic	London (Carshalton)	War Memorial Sports Ground	5,000
Chatham Town	Chatham, Kent	The Bauvil Stadium	5,000
Cheshunt	Cheshunt	Theobalds Lane	3,000
Chichester City	Chichester	Oaklands Park	2,000
Cray Valley Paper Mills	London (Eltham)	Badgers Sports Ground	1,000
Cray Wanderers	London (Chislehurst)	Flamingo Park	2,500
Dartford	Dartford	Princes Park	4,100
Dover Athletic	Dover	Crabble Athletic Ground	6,500
Dulwich Hamlet	London (East Dulwich)	Champion Hill	3,334
Folkestone Invicta	Folkestone	Cheriton Road	4,000
Hashtag United	Aveley	Parkside	3,500
Hastings United	Hastings	The Pilot Field	4,050
Hendon	London (Hendon)	Silver Jubilee Park	2,000
Horsham	Horsham	The Camping World Community Stadium	3,000
Lewes	Lewes	The Dripping Pan	3,000
Potters Bar Town	Potters Bar	Parkfield	2,000
Whitehawk	Brighton (Whitehawk)	The Enclosed Ground	3,126
Wingate & Finchley	London (Finchley)	The Maurice Rebak Stadium	1,500

== North Division ==
Isthmian League North Division
- Season: 2024–25
- Champions: Brentwood Town
- Promoted: Brentwood Town; Bury Town
- Relegated: Haringey Borough; Ipswich Wanderers; Basildon United; Sporting Bengal United
- Matches: 462
- Goals: 1,368 (2.96 per match)
- Top goalscorer: Daniel Ogunleye (36 goals)
- Biggest home win: Brentwood Town 8–0 Ipswich Wanderers (9 November 2024)
- Biggest away win: Sporting Bengal United 0–8 Felixstowe & Walton United; 29 March 2025)
- Highest scoring: Waltham Abbey 7–2 Tilbury (23 November 2024)
- Highest attendance: 1,615; Maldon & Tiptree vs Heybridge Swifts (21 April 2025)
- Lowest attendance: 38; Sporting Bengal United vs Gorleston (19 March 2025)

The North Division comprises 22 teams for the first time following the introduction of play-offs at step five the previous season. Fourteen teams competed in the previous season in the division.

=== Team changes ===
To the North Division

Promoted from the Eastern Counties League

- Mildenhall Town
- Newmarket Town

Promoted from the Essex Senior League

- Sporting Bengal United
- Tilbury

Relegated from the Premier Division

- Concord Rangers
- Haringey Borough

Transferred from the Northern Premier Division One Midlands

- Cambridge City

Transferred from the Southern League Division One Central

- Waltham Abbey

From the North Division

Promoted to the Premier Division

- Bowers & Pitsea

Promoted to the Southern League Premier Division Central

- Lowestoft Town

Relegated to the Eastern Counties League

- Stowmarket Town

Transferred to the Southern League Division One Central

- Enfield

Resigned from league

- East Thurrock United
- New Salamis

=== North Division table ===
Pos	Team	Pld	W	D	L	GF	GA	GD	Pts	Promotion, qualification or relegation
1	Brentwood Town (C, P)	42	28	5	9	97	46	+51	89	Promotion to the Premier Division
2	Felixstowe & Walton United	42	26	7	9	92	48	+44	85	Qualification for the play-offs
3	Bury Town (O, P)	42	25	10	7	75	45	+30	85	Qualification for the play-offs
4	Waltham Abbey	42	23	10	9	80	44	+36	79	Qualification for the play-offs
5	Brightlingsea Regent	42	22	10	10	69	50	+19	76	Qualification for the play-offs
6	Tilbury	42	21	8	13	61	53	+8	71	
7	Witham Town	42	21	6	15	72	61	+11	69	
8	Gorleston	42	19	11	12	66	48	+18	68	
9	Grays Athletic	42	20	8	14	62	49	+13	68	
10	Walthamstow	42	20	7	15	74	56	+18	67	
11	Cambridge City	42	17	9	16	64	62	+2	60	
12	Redbridge	42	16	10	16	77	69	+8	58	
13	Maldon & Tiptree	42	13	12	17	49	51	−2	51	
14	Heybridge Swifts	42	13	12	17	59	71	−12	51	
15	Mildenhall Town	42	13	10	19	41	53	−12	49	
16	Concord Rangers	42	13	9	20	58	72	−14	48	
17	Wroxham	42	10	14	18	50	65	−15	44	
18	Newmarket Town	42	11	10	21	55	84	−29	43	
19	Haringey Borough (R)	42	9	15	18	58	73	−15	42	Relegation to the Spartan South Midlands League
20	Ipswich Wanderers (R)	42	7	8	27	34	79	−45	29	Relegation to the Eastern Counties League
21	Basildon United (R)	42	7	6	29	39	87	−48	27	Relegation to the Essex Senior League
22	Sporting Bengal United (R)	42	6	7	29	36	102	−66	25	Relegation to the Essex Senior League

Source: Isthmian League
Rules for classification: 1) points; 2) goal difference; 3) number of goals scored; 4) number of matches won; 5) head-to-head results
(C) Champions; (O) Play-off winners; (P) Promoted; (R) Relegated

=== Play-offs ===
Semi-finals
2	Felixstowe & Walton United	1
5	Brightlingsea Regent	3
3	Bury Town	4
4	Waltham Abbey	0

Final
3	Bury Town	1
5	Brightlingsea Regent	0

==== Semifinals ====
29 April	Bury Town	4–0	Waltham Abbey	Bury St Edmunds
19:45	Canfer 45', 80'; Davis 54'; Parr 61'	Report		Stadium: Ram Meadow; Attendance: 1,315

29 April	Felixstowe & Walton United	1–3	Brightlingsea Regent	Felixstowe
19:45	Harrison 88'	Report	Hubbard 3'; Kudiabor 7'; McDonald 85'	Stadium: Dellwood Avenue; Attendance: 1,106

==== Final ====
3 May	Bury Town	1–0	Brightlingsea Regent	Bury St Edmunds
15:00	Upson 90+4'	Report		Stadium: Ram Meadow; Attendance: 2,139

=== Results table ===
Home \ Away	BAS	BRE	BRI	BUR	CAM	CON	FEL	GOR	GRA	HAR	HEY	IPS	MAL	MIL	NEW	RED	SPO	TIL	WAB	WAL	WIT	WRO
Basildon United	—	0–1	1–3	1–1	0–1	0–2	1–1	1–0	1–0	1–0	1–3	1–2	1–0	3–1	0–2	1–2	2–2	2–3	0–2	3–3	2–3	1–4
Brentwood Town	4–0	—	1–2	4–1	3–1	2–2	3–2	4–0	1–5	1–0	1–2	8–0	1–1	6–1	5–0	5–2	4–1	2–1	0–0	3–2	3–0	2–0
Brightlingsea Regent	2–0	0–1	—	1–0	4–0	2–2	1–0	2–0	1–2	1–1	0–1	3–1	1–1	0–3	4–3	2–2	2–1	2–1	1–1	1–1	0–3	1–0
Bury Town	4–0	0–3	1–2	—	1–1	3–2	2–0	2–1	3–0	2–1	1–1	2–0	1–1	2–1	2–1	0–0	2–1	2–1	0–2	3–1	2–1	2–0
Cambridge City	1–3	0–1	2–2	2–4	—	2–0	0–2	2–0	2–1	2–1	3–2	1–2	0–0	1–1	2–0	1–0	1–0	1–2	0–1	3–1	1–2	0–0
Concord Rangers	2–0	5–1	0–2	0–3	4–4	—	0–3	1–3	0–1	0–4	2–1	4–0	3–0	2–0	1–1	0–3	2–1	1–0	2–3	1–0	2–3	0–1
Felixstowe & Walton United	2–1	2–1	3–3	3–1	2–0	5–2	—	1–1	1–3	0–0	2–3	1–0	1–0	3–0	6–1	4–0	3–2	2–1	2–0	2–1	3–2	2–1
Gorleston	1–0	2–2	2–2	0–2	2–1	4–0	1–2	—	2–1	7–0	0–2	1–1	2–1	1–0	2–1	1–0	4–0	2–0	1–2	1–2	2–0	2–2
Grays Athletic	1–0	0–2	1–2	0–1	3–2	2–0	1–0	0–0	—	2–0	0–0	2–0	1–0	1–1	2–0	1–2	1–0	0–0	3–5	0–4	2–1	2–5
Haringey Borough	3–3	0–5	0–2	3–4	1–1	1–1	0–1	0–2	2–1	—	2–0	2–0	1–2	1–2	2–1	3–3	2–0	2–3	2–2	1–1	2–2	2–2
Heybridge Swifts	2–1	1–3	1–4	0–1	1–1	2–1	0–2	0–2	0–4	2–2	—	0–1	1–1	1–3	1–1	3–3	2–2	0–1	1–2	2–1	2–2	0–0
Ipswich Wanderers	2–1	0–2	1–0	2–4	1–2	0–2	1–2	1–1	0–1	1–3	0–0	—	3–1	0–0	0–1	2–2	1–1	0–0	0–1	1–5	0–2	0–1
Maldon & Tiptree	5–0	2–0	2–1	1–1	2–1	2–2	1–4	0–1	1–1	1–2	5–2	1–0	—	0–2	0–1	1–0	0–2	0–0	0–1	1–1	0–1	1–0
Mildenhall Town	2–1	0–1	0–0	0–0	1–3	0–1	1–1	1–0	2–2	1–1	0–2	2–1	1–0	—	0–1	2–1	3–0	0–1	2–1	0–2	0–1	1–2
Newmarket Town	2–0	1–2	0–2	1–1	4–2	1–1	0–4	2–2	1–4	2–2	1–2	3–2	0–2	1–1	—	3–0	2–1	3–3	0–1	1–4	0–1	3–2
Redbridge	5–1	2–4	5–2	1–2	1–2	2–1	0–1	2–2	1–2	2–0	3–3	5–2	2–3	3–0	3–2	—	4–1	1–2	0–2	3–0	1–0	2–1
Sporting Bengal United	1–4	2–0	2–0	0–4	0–5	2–2	0–8	1–3	0–3	0–4	1–2	1–0	2–1	1–1	1–2	0–3	—	2–3	2–1	0–0	1–1	0–2
Tilbury	2–0	0–1	2–1	0–1	1–1	2–0	2–1	1–1	2–1	3–2	2–1	0–1	1–1	1–0	3–0	3–3	4–1	—	4–1	1–0	2–1	1–0
Waltham Abbey	5–0	1–0	0–1	3–1	1–2	3–1	1–1	2–2	1–0	1–1	1–2	4–1	2–2	1–0	2–2	1–1	5–0	7–2	—	0–1	4–1	5–1
Walthamstow	1–0	2–0	0–2	1–1	1–0	1–1	5–3	1–2	0–2	2–0	3–2	4–3	3–1	0–2	5–2	2–0	2–1	3–0	0–1	—	1–2	1–2
Witham Town	1–1	1–2	1–3	1–4	2–4	2–1	3–2	2–1	2–2	3–1	3–1	2–1	0–1	2–1	3–1	0–1	6–0	2–0	2–1	1–2	—	4–1
Wroxham	3–0	2–2	1–2	1–1	2–3	0–2	2–2	1–2	1–1	1–1	2–5	0–0	1–4	1–2	1–1	1–1	1–0	1–0	0–0	1–4	0–0	—

Source: Football Web Pages
Legend: Blue = home team win; Yellow = draw; Red = away team win.

=== Stadiums and locations ===
Locations of North Division clubs

Club	Location	Stadium	Capacity
Basildon United	Basildon	Gardiners Close	2,000
Brentwood Town	Brentwood	The Brentwood Centre Arena	1,800
Brightlingsea Regent	Brightlingsea	North Road	2,000
Bury Town	Bury St Edmunds	Ram Meadow	3,500
Cambridge City	Sawston	West Way	3,000
Concord Rangers	Canvey Island	Thames Road	3,300
Felixstowe & Walton United	Felixstowe	Dellwood Avenue	2,000
Gorleston	Gorleston-on-Sea	Wellesley Recreation Ground (groundshare with Great Yarmouth Town)	3,600 (500 seated)
Grays Athletic	Tilbury	Chadfields (groundshare with Tilbury)	4,000
Haringey Borough	Tottenham	Coles Park	2,500
Heybridge Swifts	Heybridge	Scraley Road	3,000
Ipswich Wanderers	Rushmere	Humber Doucy Lane	550
Maldon & Tiptree	Maldon	Wallace Binder Ground	2,000
Mildenhall Town	Mildenhall	Recreation Way	2,000
Newmarket Town	Newmarket	Cricket Field Road	2,750
Redbridge	Barkingside	Oakside Stadium	3,000 (316 seated)
Sporting Bengal United	Mile End	Mile End Stadium	2,000
Tilbury	Tilbury	Chadfields	4,000
Waltham Abbey	Waltham Abbey	Capershotts	3,500
Walthamstow	London (Walthamstow)	Wadham Lodge	3,500
Witham Town	Witham	Spa Road	2,500
Wroxham	Wroxham	Trafford Park	2,500

== South Central Division ==
Isthmian League South Central Division
- Season: 2024–25
- Champions: Farnham Town
- Promoted: Farnham Town; Uxbridge
- Relegated: Guernsey; Ashford Town; Sutton Common Rovers; Badshot Lea
- Matches: 462
- Goals: 1,553 (3.36 per match)
- Top goalscorer: Eddie Simon (34 goals)
- Biggest home win: Uxbridge 10–0 Leatherhead (5 April 2025)
- Biggest away win: Moneyfields 0–5 Farnham Town (31 August 2024); Ashford Town 0–5 Raynes Park Vale (4 October 2024); Westfield 0–5 Kingstonian (26 October 2024); Uxbridge 0–5 Farnham Town (2 November 2024); Sutton Common Rovers 0–5 Southall (30 November 2024); Rayners Lane 1–6 Farnham Town (7 December 2024); South Park 1–6 Farnham Town (14 December 2024); Horndean 1–6 South Park (29 March 2025); Rayners Lane 1–6 Sutton Common Rovers (21 April 2025); Ashford Town 0–5 Southall (26 April 2025)
- Highest scoring: Ashford Town 7–4 Kingstonian (8 October 2024); Moneyfields 6–5 Rayners Lane (26 April 2025)
- Highest attendance: 2,207; Guernsey vs Westfield (29 March 2025)
- Lowest attendance: 30; Rayners Lane vs Moneyfields (7 September 2024)

The South Central Division consists of 22 teams, 15 of which competed in the previous campaign.

=== Team changes ===
To the South Central Division

Promoted from the Combined Counties Premier Division North

- Rayners Lane

Promoted from the Combined Counties Premier Division South

- Farnham Town

Promoted from the Wessex Football League

- Moneyfields

Relegated from the Premier Division

- Kingstonian

Relegated from the Southern League Premier Division South

- Harrow Borough
- Hayes & Yeading United

Transferred from the South East Division

- Horndean

From the South Central Division

Promoted to the Southern League Premier Division South

- Chertsey Town
- Marlow

Relegated to the Combined Counties Premier Division South

- Chipstead
- Corinthian-Casuals

Transferred to the Southern League Division One Central

- Northwood

Transferred to the Southern League Division One South

- Thatcham Town

=== South Central Division table ===
Pos	Team	Pld	W	D	L	GF	GA	GD	Pts	Promotion, qualification or relegation
1	Farnham Town (C, P)	42	32	6	4	120	32	+88	102	Promotion to the Southern League Premier South
2	Uxbridge (O, P)	42	25	7	10	90	56	+34	82	Qualification for the play-offs
3	Hanworth Villa	42	24	7	11	73	51	+22	79	Qualification for the play-offs
4	Ascot United	42	22	11	9	79	55	+24	77	Qualification for the play-offs
5	Kingstonian	42	23	7	12	86	58	+28	76	Qualification for the play-offs
6	Hayes & Yeading United	42	21	12	9	77	53	+24	75	
7	Moneyfields	42	22	8	12	90	70	+20	74	
8	Leatherhead	42	21	9	12	80	59	+21	72	
9	Raynes Park Vale	42	19	10	13	83	64	+19	67	
10	Hartley Wintney	42	21	3	18	70	58	+12	66	
11	Rayners Lane	42	17	10	15	89	88	+1	61	Transfer to the Southern League Division One Central
12	Westfield	42	15	10	17	62	77	−15	55	
13	Southall	42	14	9	19	63	70	−7	51	
14	Harrow Borough	42	14	9	19	56	67	−11	51	
15	South Park	42	12	10	20	56	71	−15	46	
16	Metropolitan Police	42	12	8	22	52	74	−22	44	
17	Horndean	42	11	10	21	62	97	−35	43	
18	Binfield	42	12	7	23	52	88	−36	43	
19	Guernsey (R)	42	11	9	22	61	95	−34	42	Relegation to the Southern Combination League
20	Ashford Town (R)	42	10	7	25	59	87	−28	37	Relegation to the Combined Counties League Premier North
21	Sutton Common Rovers (R)	42	10	4	28	48	80	−32	34	Relegation to the Combined Counties League Premier South
22	Badshot Lea (R)	42	3	9	30	45	103	−58	18	Relegation to the Combined Counties League Premier South

Source: Isthmian League
Rules for classification: 1) points; 2) goal difference; 3) number of goals scored; 4) number of matches won; 5) head-to-head results
(C) Champions; (O) Play-off winners; (P) Promoted; (R) Relegated

=== Play-offs ===
Semi-finals
2	Uxbridge	2 (5)
5	Kingstonian	2 (4)
3	Hanworth Villa	2
4	Ascot United	1

Final
2	Uxbridge	2
3	Hanworth Villa	1

==== Semifinals ====
30 April	Hanworth Villa	2–1	Ascot United	Hanworth
19:45	Ansah-Palmer 3'; Merson 57'	Report	Simmo 90+4'	Stadium: Rectory Meadow; Attendance: 724; Referee: Jonathon Wilks

30 April	Uxbridge	2–2 (a.e.t.) (5–4 p)	Kingstonian	Yiewsley
19:45	Fosu 55'; Addae 73'	Report	Flaherty 17'; Simon 90+10'	Stadium: Honeycroft; Attendance: 670; Referee: Steven Goldup
	Penalties
	Penalty scored		Penalty scored Penalty missed

==== Final ====
4 May	Uxbridge	2–1	Hanworth Villa	Yiewsley
	Okorogheye 45+2'; Moore 74'	Report	Ansah-Palmer 17'	Stadium: Honeycroft; Attendance: 1,535; Referee: Alexander Shipp

=== Results table ===
Home \ Away	ASC	ASH	BAD	BIN	FAR	GUE	HAN	HRW	HAR	HAY	HOR	KIN	LEA	MET	MON	RLA	RPV	SPK	SHL	SCR	UXB	WES
Ascot United	—	0–0	1–0	1–0	1–5	3–3	0–1	2–0	3–0	2–1	3–4	0–2	1–1	3–0	3–2	3–1	2–3	1–0	1–1	2–1	0–0	6–0
Ashford Town	1–2	—	3–0	3–1	0–2	5–0	2–2	3–0	1–3	1–4	0–1	7–4	2–2	1–2	1–3	2–4	0–5	0–2	0–5	1–1	1–2	4–1
Badshot Lea	0–4	6–3	—	0–2	1–5	0–2	0–2	2–3	0–1	0–2	1–2	2–2	0–4	1–1	1–2	1–1	2–3	0–0	1–3	0–3	0–4	2–1
Binfield	1–3	0–1	1–1	—	0–3	0–2	2–2	4–3	0–4	0–1	0–4	0–0	2–2	1–0	0–1	0–1	2–1	2–0	0–1	2–0	0–0	0–1
Farnham Town	1–1	2–1	2–1	7–0	—	7–0	0–1	4–0	0–1	3–2	2–2	2–0	2–1	2–1	1–1	6–0	2–1	1–0	1–1	3–0	2–1	2–0
Guernsey	0–4	1–0	2–2	1–2	3–6	—	2–1	0–3	0–2	1–2	2–2	0–3	0–3	2–0	4–5	1–5	1–2	3–0	1–0	4–3	2–2	1–1
Hanworth Villa	0–0	4–1	3–1	2–0	1–1	1–0	—	5–3	4–1	2–0	5–2	1–3	0–1	0–3	1–1	0–1	1–1	2–1	3–2	1–0	2–2	2–0
Harrow Borough	0–3	1–0	1–2	4–1	0–1	0–3	1–3	—	1–0	0–0	3–2	0–0	2–2	2–2	2–1	2–0	0–1	1–1	4–1	3–1	3–0	1–0
Hartley Wintney	5–2	0–1	3–0	0–2	1–3	2–1	1–3	0–0	—	0–1	2–1	0–2	0–2	3–2	4–0	1–0	0–1	5–0	2–0	2–1	5–1	1–2
Hayes & Yeading United	2–2	2–1	1–1	4–3	2–1	1–0	1–2	2–0	3–2	—	4–0	1–2	2–2	2–1	4–2	1–1	4–1	2–1	2–1	1–0	2–3	1–1
Horndean	2–3	0–0	4–3	1–4	0–0	2–3	2–0	1–0	4–0	1–1	—	1–1	1–1	1–0	1–1	4–2	1–2	1–6	1–1	0–2	2–3	3–1
Kingstonian	2–2	1–0	5–3	7–1	0–4	3–1	0–1	1–0	2–1	1–1	4–0	—	1–1	5–1	1–0	1–4	2–4	0–1	2–0	3–0	3–0	1–5
Leatherhead	3–0	4–0	3–2	4–1	4–1	1–0	2–1	3–0	2–3	0–1	2–1	3–2	—	3–2	0–1	6–1	0–1	2–1	2–1	1–0	0–1	1–2
Metropolitan Police	0–1	3–2	2–1	1–2	0–3	3–3	0–2	1–4	1–1	4–2	3–0	1–0	0–2	—	0–1	1–1	0–0	2–1	2–1	1–3	0–2	2–2
Moneyfields	1–1	5–1	2–2	5–0	0–5	4–1	2–3	3–2	3–0	2–2	4–1	1–3	2–1	1–4	—	6–5	3–2	2–0	3–0	4–3	2–0	2–0
Rayners Lane	2–3	2–1	2–2	5–2	1–6	3–2	0–2	3–1	3–0	1–0	5–1	1–2	3–5	1–0	2–2	—	5–0	2–1	1–1	1–6	1–2	4–1
Raynes Park Vale	1–2	1–3	5–1	2–4	1–2	1–1	3–0	1–1	2–3	2–2	4–0	3–0	1–1	3–0	2–2	2–1	—	1–1	4–1	1–2	1–4	3–1
South Park	2–2	3–0	2–1	3–3	1–6	3–2	1–0	3–0	1–2	2–1	2–2	1–2	3–1	1–1	2–1	3–3	0–3	—	0–2	3–2	0–2	1–1
Southall	2–1	1–1	1–0	2–1	1–5	1–1	5–1	1–3	1–1	0–4	4–3	1–2	1–1	1–2	0–3	3–3	2–1	3–1	—	4–2	0–1	2–1
Sutton Common Rovers	0–2	0–1	3–0	1–3	0–1	2–2	0–2	1–1	1–4	1–3	1–0	1–5	1–0	0–2	1–2	1–1	1–3	1–0	0–5	—	0–3	0–1
Uxbridge	3–0	2–1	4–0	2–1	0–5	4–1	2–1	1–1	0–4	2–2	8–0	2–1	10–0	4–0	2–1	2–4	2–2	2–1	1–0	0–1	—	3–4
Westfield	2–3	3–3	3–2	2–2	0–3	1–2	1–3	2–0	1–0	1–1	4–1	0–5	3–1	3–1	2–1	2–2	2–2	1–1	1–0	2–1	0–1	—

Source: Football Web Pages
Legend: Blue = home team win; Yellow = draw; Red = away team win.

=== Stadiums and locations ===
Locations of South Central Division clubs
Greater London South Central Division clubs

Club	Location	Stadium	Capacity
Ascot United	Ascot	The Racecourse Ground	1,150
Ashford Town	Ashford, Surrey	Robert Parker Stadium	2,550
Badshot Lea	Wrecclesham	Westfield Lane	1,200
Binfield	Binfield	Hill Farm Lane	1,000
Farnham Town	Farnham	The Memorial Ground	1,500
Guernsey	Saint Peter Port	Footes Lane	5,000
Hanworth Villa	Hanworth	Rectory Meadow	1,000
Harrow Borough	Harrow	Earlsmead Stadium	3,000
Hartley Wintney	Hartley Wintney	The Memorial Playing Fields	2,000
Hayes & Yeading United	Hayes, Hillingdon	SkyEx Community Stadium	3,000
Horndean	Horndean	Five Heads Park	2,000
Kingstonian	Kingston upon Thames	Imperial Fields (groundshare with Tooting & Mitcham United)	2,700
Leatherhead	Leatherhead	Fetcham Grove	3,400
Metropolitan Police	East Molesey	Imber Court	3,000
Moneyfields	Portsmouth	John Jenkins Stadium	1,180
Rayners Lane	Rayners Lane	The Tithe Farm Social Club	1,000
Raynes Park Vale	Raynes Park	Grand Drive	1,500
South Park	Reigate	King George's Field	2,000
Southall	Stanwell	Robert Parker Stadium (groundshare with Ashford Town)	2,550
Sutton Common Rovers	Tandridge, Surrey	Church Road (groundshare with AFC Whyteleafe)	2,000
Uxbridge	West Drayton	Honeycroft	3,770
Westfield	Woking (Westfield)	Woking Park	1,000

== South East Division ==
Isthmian League South East Division
- Season: 2024–25
- Champions: Ramsgate
- Promoted: Ramsgate; Burgess Hill Town
- Relegated: Phoenix Sports; Hythe Town; Lancing; Steyning Town
- Matches: 462
- Goals: 1,604 (3.47 per match)
- Top goalscorer: Joe Taylor (40 goals)
- Biggest home win: Beckenham Town 9–0 Lancing (22 February 2025); Merstham 9–0 East Grinstead Town (18 March 2025)
- Biggest away win: Sevenoaks Town 0–5 Beckenham Town (31 August 2024); Hythe Town 0–5 Erith Town (21 September 2024); Lancing 0–5 Deal Town (28 December 2024); Three Bridges 0–5 Ramsgate (4 January 2025); Lancing 0–5 Ramsgate (15 March 2025); East Grinstead Town 0–5 Sittingbourne (12 April 2025)
- Highest scoring: Herne Bay 9–1 Lancing (5 April 2025)
- Highest attendance: 3,300; Ramsgate vs Margate (21 April 2025)
- Lowest attendance: 38; Three Bridges vs Littlehampton Town (14 September 2024)

The South East Division will consist of 22 teams for the first time, sixteen of which competed in the previous season.

=== Team changes ===
To the South East Division

Promoted from the Southern Combination League

- Eastbourne Town
- Steyning Town

Promoted from the Southern Counties East League

- Deal Town
- Erith Town

Promoted from the Combined Counties League

- AFC Croydon Athletic

Relegated from the Premier Division

- Margate

From the South East Division

Promoted to the Premier Division

- Chichester City
- Cray Valley Paper Mills

Relegated to the Southern Counties East League

- Erith & Belvedere

Transferred to the South Central Division

- Horndean

=== South East Division table ===
Pos	Team	Pld	W	D	L	GF	GA	GD	Pts	Promotion, qualification or relegation
1	Ramsgate (C, P)	42	35	4	3	127	38	+89	109	Promotion to the Premier Division
2	Sittingbourne	42	31	8	3	117	29	+88	101	Qualification for the play-offs
3	Burgess Hill Town (O, P)	42	27	9	6	87	42	+45	90	Qualification for the play-offs
4	Margate	42	25	12	5	89	50	+39	87	Qualification for the play-offs
5	Merstham	42	22	12	8	92	62	+30	78	Qualification for the play-offs
6	Beckenham Town	42	22	8	12	89	65	+24	74	
7	Deal Town	42	21	2	19	92	81	+11	65	
8	Three Bridges	42	19	7	16	79	76	+3	64	
9	Sevenoaks Town	42	17	11	14	81	81	0	62	
10	Sheppey United	42	18	7	17	69	65	+4	61	
11	Ashford United	42	16	8	18	75	78	−3	56	
12	AFC Croydon Athletic	42	14	13	15	63	62	+1	55	
13	Broadbridge Heath	42	15	10	17	68	73	−5	55	
14	Erith Town	42	14	11	17	72	64	+8	53	
15	Eastbourne Town	42	15	8	19	56	66	−10	53	
16	Herne Bay	42	12	9	21	62	79	−17	45	
17	East Grinstead Town	42	13	5	24	49	91	−42	44	
18	Littlehampton Town	42	12	7	23	66	87	−21	43	Transfer to the South Central Division
19	Phoenix Sports (R)	42	10	6	26	41	86	−45	36	Relegation to the Southern Counties East League
20	Steyning Town (R)	42	7	5	30	54	102	−48	26	Relegation to the Southern Combination League
21	Hythe Town (R)	42	6	4	32	39	109	−70	22	Relegation to the Southern Counties East League
22	Lancing (R)	42	6	4	32	37	118	−81	22	Relegation to the Southern Combination League

Source: Football Web Pages
Rules for classification: 1) points; 2) goal difference; 3) number of goals scored; 4) number of matches won; 5) head-to-head results
(C) Champions; (O) Play-off winners; (P) Promoted; (R) Relegated

=== Play-offs ===
Semi-finals
2	Sittingbourne	4
5	Merstham	2
3	Burgess Hill Town	2
4	Margate	0

Final
2	Sittingbourne	1 (2)
3	Burgess Hill Town	1 (3)

==== Semifinals ====
29 April	Burgess Hill Town	2–0	Margate	Burgess Hill
19:45	Box 33'; Price 63'			Stadium: Leylands Park; Attendance: 1,439; Referee: Andrew Dunn

29 April	Sittingbourne	4–2	Merstham	Sittingbourne
19:45	May 66'; Kingsford 68'; Azeez 89', 90+4'	Report	Henry 90+2'; Johnson 90+5'	Stadium: The Staxson Stadium; Attendance: 954; Referee: Mr Nixon

==== Final ====
3 May	Sittingbourne	1–1 (a.e.t.) (2–3 p)	Burgess Hill Town	Sittingbourne
15:00	May 34'		Vukojie 72'	Stadium: The Staxson Stadium; Attendance: 1,583; Referee: Mr Evans

=== Results table ===
Home \ Away	CRO	ASH	BEC	BRO	BUR	DEA	EGT	EAS	ERI	HER	HYT	LAN	LIT	MAR	MER	PHO	RAM	SEV	SHE	SIT	STE	THR
AFC Croydon Athletic		2–1	1–1	1–1	3–0	1–2	4–1	1–1	0–0	4–1	3–1	2–0	2–2	1–0	3–3	5–1	0–1	1–3	2–1	0–4	3–1	0–1
Ashford United	1–1		0–3	0–3	2–1	3–0	3–0	0–1	3–1	3–1	5–3	3–1	3–2	2–2	0–1	1–3	2–3	2–2	2–1	1–1	3–6	2–3
Beckenham Town	1–2	1–3		3–2	0–0	4–1	2–2	2–2	3–0	2–0	4–0	9–0	0–1	0–2	3–0	1–0	1–3	4–3	1–0	2–2	4–2	2–2
Broadbridge Heath	2–2	2–2	2–3		1–2	1–3	4–2	1–2	3–3	3–0	3–1	1–0	4–0	1–2	1–2	1–1	1–5	2–2	1–4	2–3	0–2	1–3
Burgess Hill Town	1–0	2–1	4–2	0–3		4–0	2–1	1–1	1–0	2–0	5–0	5–0	3–2	2–1	1–1	2–1	0–0	2–0	3–0	0–2	3–1	4–0
Deal Town	1–2	1–3	1–2	5–0	3–5		1–0	4–1	1–3	1–1	3–0	3–1	3–1	0–1	4–3	2–1	2–4	3–1	3–1	2–3	2–0	3–0
East Grinstead Town	2–1	1–3	2–1	1–2	1–4	2–3		1–3	0–4	0–4	2–1	1–3	0–3	0–2	0–1	4–2	2–1	1–3	2–1	0–5	0–1	0–1
Eastbourne Town	1–0	1–2	1–3	0–1	0–3	5–3	1–1		2–1	2–0	0–0	2–1	0–0	2–4	0–1	1–0	1–2	0–2	2–2	1–2	4–0	2–2
Erith Town	3–0	3–3	2–3	1–0	1–2	2–1	0–0	2–0		1–5	3–0	6–1	4–1	1–3	0–3	2–0	0–1	2–2	1–1	1–1	6–0	0–1
Herne Bay	2–2	3–1	1–0	0–0	0–2	0–3	1–2	2–1	4–1		1–1	9–1	3–2	1–2	1–1	1–2	1–2	3–5	0–4	0–4	2–0	4–3
Hythe Town	2–0	0–2	1–5	1–2	0–2	2–2	0–1	1–2	0–5	2–1		3–0	2–2	2–3	2–5	2–1	0–4	2–4	0–4	1–2	3–2	0–1
Lancing	1–3	2–1	0–1	0–2	0–1	0–5	2–6	0–2	0–1	2–0	1–2		4–2	1–2	0–1	2–0	0–5	4–3	0–0	0–1	1–1	0–2
Littlehampton Town	1–0	1–3	1–2	2–2	3–1	2–4	0–1	1–0	1–1	2–3	5–0	2–2		1–2	2–3	4–0	2–3	0–4	3–1	0–1	1–4	4–3
Margate	2–2	1–0	6–2	1–1	1–1	2–1	0–0	4–0	2–2	0–0	3–0	3–0	4–1		1–1	2–2	2–2	1–2	3–2	0–3	2–0	2–0
Merstham	3–3	2–0	4–2	2–3	2–2	2–4	9–0	1–3	1–1	1–0	2–1	3–0	2–1	3–3		5–0	3–2	2–2	1–1	1–0	1–1	3–2
Phoenix Sports	2–1	2–2	0–1	1–1	0–3	2–1	1–2	0–2	2–1	1–3	2–1	3–1	0–2	0–2	0–3		0–1	2–1	0–2	0–3	3–2	2–2
Ramsgate	5–0	4–0	5–0	1–0	2–2	3–0	2–1	4–0	3–1	3–0	2–0	4–1	5–0	1–4	4–1	4–1		5–1	5–0	4–2	4–1	5–1
Sevenoaks Town	0–2	3–1	0–5	1–3	3–1	2–1	2–2	4–1	0–0	1–1	1–0	2–0	1–1	3–3	2–2	2–0	2–3		2–0	1–1	4–3	0–4
Sheppey United	1–0	1–2	0–1	3–2	2–2	2–4	3–1	1–0	3–1	0–0	3–1	2–1	2–0	2–3	4–3	3–1	0–1	3–1		0–0	2–0	2–3
Sittingbourne	3–1	3–1	0–0	5–0	1–1	5–0	3–0	2–0	3–0	4–1	6–0	8–1	3–1	3–0	2–0	4–0	3–3	3–0	4–0		5–0	3–0
Steyning Town	1–1	3–2	1–1	1–2	0–3	2–5	2–3	0–3	1–5	4–0	2–1	3–3	0–1	1–3	0–1	0–1	0–1	0–3	2–3	1–2		1–2
Three Bridges	1–1	1–1	6–2	0–1	1–2	2–1	0–1	4–3	3–0	2–2	3–0	3–0	2–3	1–3	1–3	1–1	0–5	5–1	1–2	3–2	3–2	

Source: Football Web Pages
Legend: Blue = home team win; Yellow = draw; Red = away team win.

=== Stadiums and locations ===
Locations of South East Division clubs
Greater London South East Division football clubs

Club	Location	Stadium	Capacity
AFC Croydon Athletic	Thornton Heath	Mayfield Stadium	3,000
Ashford United	Ashford, Kent	The Homelands	3,200
Beckenham Town	Beckenham	Eden Park Avenue	4,000
Broadbridge Heath	Broadbridge Heath	High Wood Hill Sports Ground	
Burgess Hill Town	Burgess Hill	Leylands Park	2,500
Deal Town	Deal	Charles Sports Ground	2,000
East Grinstead Town	East Grinstead	East Court	1,500
Eastbourne Town	Eastbourne	The Saffrons	3,000
Erith Town	Thamesmead	Bayliss Avenue	1,000
Herne Bay	Herne Bay	Winch's Field	4,000
Hythe Town	Hythe	Reachfields Stadium	3,000
Lancing	Lancing	Culver Road	1,500
Littlehampton Town	Littlehampton	The Sportsfield	4,000
Margate	Margate	Hartsdown Park	3,000
Merstham	Merstham	Moatside	2,500
Phoenix Sports	Barnehurst	The Mayplace Ground	2,000
Ramsgate	Ramsgate	Southwood Stadium	3,500
Sevenoaks Town	Sevenoaks	Greatness Park	1,000
Sheppey United	Isle of Sheppey	Holm Park	1,900
Sittingbourne	Sittingbourne	Woodstock Park	3,000
Steyning Town	Steyning	The Shooting Field	2,000
Three Bridges	Crawley (Three Bridges)	Jubilee Field	1,500

== League Cup ==
The 2024–25 Velocity Trophy (formerly the Isthmian League Cup) was the 51st season of the Alan Turvey Trophy, the cup competition of the whole Isthmian League.

Chatham Town were defending champions, having beaten Hashtag United in the 2023–24 season.

=== First round ===
Four clubs participated in the first round.

Tie	Home team (tier)	Score	Away team (tier)	Att.
1	Sevenoaks Town (SE)	3–0	Phoenix Sports (SE)	63
2	Steyning Town (SE)	1–4	Broadbridge Heath (SE)	131

=== Second round ===
The two clubs who progressed from the first round, were joined by thirty-four clubs who received a bye to the second round.

Tie	Home team (tier)	Score	Away team (tier)	Att.
1	AFC Croydon Athletic (SE)	4–1	Rayners Lane (SC)	69
2	Badshot Lea (SC)	1–3	Binfield (SC)	90
3	Concord Rangers (N)	4–5	Basildon United (N)	140
4	East Grinstead Town (SE)	0–1	Merstham (SE)	115
5	Walthamstow (N)	1–1	Grays Athletic (N)	78
Grays Athletic advanced 4–2 on penalties
6	Ascot United (SC)	2–1	Sutton Common Rovers (SC)	80
7	Deal Town (SE)	2–0	Hythe Town (SE)	250
8	Erith Town (SE)	4–1	Sittingbourne (SE)	115
9	Hayes & Yeading United (SC)	5–3	Moneyfields (SC)	81
10	Leatherhead (SC)	1–0	South Park (SC)	185
11	Newmarket Town (N)	5–2	Sporting Bengal United (N)	96
12	Ramsgate (SE)	1–1	Sevenoaks Town (SE)	355
Sevenoaks Town advanced 7–6 on penalties
13	Sheppey United (SE)	0–0	Herne Bay (SE)	222
Sheppey United advanced 5–4 on penalties
14	Harrow Borough (SC)	2–2	Southall (SC)	78
Harrow Borough advanced 5–4 on penalties
15	Westfield (SC)	2–0	Hanworth Villa (SC)	91
16	Ashford United (SE)	0–6	Margate (SE)	208
17	Witham Town (N)	1–2	Brightlingsea Regent (N)	105
18	Burgess Hill Town (SE)	1–1	Broadbridge Heath (SE)	207
Burgess Hill Town advanced 4–3 on penalties
19	Haringey Borough (N)	4–4	Tilbury (N)	109
Tilbury advanced 5–3 on penalties

=== Third round ===
Tie	Home team (tier)	Score	Away team (tier)	Att.
1	Billericay Town (P)	4–1	Basildon United (N)	411
2	Dulwich Hamlet (P)	1–4	Binfield (SC)	421
3	Bowers & Pitsea (P)	2–2	Brightlingsea Regent (N)	72
Brightlingsea Regent advanced 5–4 on penalties
4	Cheshunt (P)	1–1	Potters Bar Town (P)	175
Cheshunt advanced 4–2 on penalties
5	Sevenoaks Town (SE)	2–4	Cray Valley Paper Mills (P)	96
6	Ascot United (SC)	0–1	Chatham Town (P)	101
7	Erith Town (SE)	0–1	Dartford (P)	187
8	Hashtag United (P)	6–1	Grays Athletic (N)	173
9	Hayes & Yeading United (SC)	0–2	Harrow Borough (SC)	136
10	Hendon (P)	5–1	Newmarket Town (N)	97
11	Carshalton Athletic (P)	2–1	AFC Croydon Athletic (SE)	187
12	Hastings United (P)	2–0	Deal Town (SE)	311
13	Leatherhead (SC)	2–1	Westfield (SC)	230
14	Wingate & Finchley (P)	1–2	Tilbury (N)	101
15	Margate (SE)	2–4	Sheppey United (SE)	215
16	Merstham (SE)	2–4	Burgess Hill Town (SE)	141

=== Fourth round ===
Tie	Home team (tier)	Score	Away team (tier)	Att.
1	Billericay Town (P)	3–0	Cheshunt (P)	287
2	Brightlingsea Regent (N)	1–1	Hashtag United (P)	149
Hashtag United advanced 4–3 on penalties
3	Hastings United (P)	1–1	Cray Valley Paper Mills (P)	252
Hastings United advanced 5–4 on penalties
4	Hendon (P)	2–1	Tilbury (N)	96
5	Sheppey United (SE)	3–0	Dartford (P)	234
6	Carshalton Athletic (P)	1–1	Leatherhead (SC)	221
Leatherhead advanced 10–9 on penalties
7	Chatham Town (P)	2–0	Burgess Hill Town (SE)	336
8	Harrow Borough (N)	0–2	Binfield (SC)	75

=== Quarter Final ===
Tie	Home team (tier)	Score	Away team (tier)	Att.
1	Leatherhead (SC)	2–2	Hendon (P)	222
Hendon advanced 4–3 on penalties
2	Billericay Town (P)	1–0	Sheppey United (SE)	227
3	Hastings United (P)	1–2	Binfield (SC)	249
4	Hashtag United (P)	2–3	Chatham Town (P)	144

=== Semi Final ===
Tie	Home team (tier)	Score	Away team (tier)	Att.
1	Billericay Town (P)	4–1	Binfield (SC)	461
2	Chatham Town (P)	2–1	Hendon (P)	411

=== Final ===
9 April 2025	Billericay Town (P)	3–2	Chatham Town (P)	Aveley
19:45 BST	Steward 11'; Merrifield 37'; Williams 90+2'		Yila 48'; Isiaka 51'	Stadium: Parkside; Attendance: 1,268

== See also ==
- Isthmian League
- 2024–25 Northern Premier League
- 2024–25 Southern League
