= 2025–26 Isthmian League =

The 2025–26 season is the 111th season of the Isthmian League, which is an English football competition featuring semi-professional and amateur clubs from London, East and South East England. The league operates four divisions, the Premier Division at Step 3 and three divisions, North, South Central and South East at Step 4 of the National League System. This was the sixth season since the former South Division was subdivided into the South Central and South East divisions. The league is also known as the Pitching In League under a sponsorship deal with Entain, formerly GVC Holdings.

The allocations for steps 3 and 4 were announced by The Football Association (FA) on 15 May 2025.

== Premier Division ==
Isthmian League Premier Division
- Season: 2025–26
- Champions: Folkestone Invicta
- Promoted: Folkestone Invicta; Billericay Town
- Relegated: Canvey Island; Potters Bar Town; Hashtag United; Cray Valley Paper Mills
- Matches: 462
- Goals: 1,478 (3.2 per match)
- Top goalscorer: Jake Hutchinson (24 goals)
- Biggest home win: Folkestone Invicta 8–1 Cray Wanderers (11 November 2025); Dartford 7–0 Hashtag United (28 March 2026)
- Biggest away win: Hashtag United 0–6 Chatham Town (8 November 2025); Potters Bar Town 0–6 Chatham Town (18 April 2026)
- Highest scoring: Folkestone Invicta 8–1 Cray Wanderers (11 November 2025)
- Highest attendance: 3,344; Dulwich Hamlet vs St Albans City (8 November 2025)
- Lowest attendance: 101; Wingate & Finchley vs Burgess Hill Town (3 March 2026)

The Premier Division comprised sixteen teams from the previous season, as well as six clubs who newly joined the division.

=== Team changes ===
To the Premier Division

Promoted from the North Division

- Brentwood Town

Promoted from the South East Division

- Burgess Hill Town
- Ramsgate

Relegated from the National League South

- Aveley
- St Albans City
- Welling United

From the Premier Division

Promoted to the National League South

- Dover Athletic
- Horsham

Relegated to the North Division

- Bowers & Pitsea

Relegated to the South Central Division

- Bognor Regis Town
- Hendon

Relegated to the South East Division

- Hastings United

=== Premier Division table ===
Pos	Team	Pld	W	D	L	GF	GA	GD	Pts	Promotion, qualification or relegation
1	Folkestone Invicta (C, P)	42	29	9	4	102	40	+62	96	Promotion to the National League South
2	Aveley	42	24	12	6	90	51	+39	84	Qualification for the play-offs
3	Billericay Town (O, P)	42	24	10	8	81	48	+33	82	Qualification for the play-offs
4	Chatham Town	42	24	7	11	83	35	+48	79	Qualification for the play-offs
5	Brentwood Town	42	24	6	12	84	66	+18	78	Qualification for the play-offs
6	Dartford	42	20	12	10	81	55	+26	72	
7	Cray Wanderers	42	17	16	9	79	71	+8	67	
8	Burgess Hill Town	42	20	7	15	76	81	−5	67	
9	Dulwich Hamlet	42	17	11	14	61	53	+8	62	
10	Ramsgate	42	15	12	15	73	68	+5	57	
11	St Albans City	42	16	8	18	71	59	+12	56	
12	Chichester City	42	14	13	15	57	63	−6	55	Transferred to the Southern League Premier Division South
13	Cheshunt	42	12	14	16	65	70	−5	50	
14	Whitehawk	42	12	13	17	58	72	−14	49	
15	Welling United	42	15	3	24	54	75	−21	48	
16	Wingate & Finchley	42	12	10	20	55	67	−12	46	
17	Lewes	42	13	7	22	47	83	−36	46	
18	Carshalton Athletic	42	10	14	18	61	73	−12	44	
19	Cray Valley Paper Mills (R)	42	11	9	22	54	80	−26	42	Relegation to the South East Division
20	Hashtag United (R)	42	11	9	22	60	87	−27	42	Relegation to the North Division
21	Potters Bar Town (R)	42	9	3	30	46	94	−48	30	Relegation to the Southern League Division One Central
22	Canvey Island (R)	42	6	9	27	40	87	−47	27	Relegation to the North Division

Source: Isthmian League
Rules for classification: 1) points; 2) goal difference; 3) number of goals scored; 4) number of matches won; 5) head-to-head results
(C) Champions; (O) Play-off winners; (P) Promoted; (R) Relegated

=== Play-offs ===
Semi-finals
2	Aveley	1
5	Brentwood Town	4
3	Billericay Town	3
4	Chatham Town	2

Final
3	Billericay Town	2
5	Brentwood Town	1

==== Semi-finals ====
29 April 2026	Aveley	1–4	Brentwood Town	Aveley
19:45 GMT	Nwabueze 86'	Report	Cripps 79'; Cole 90+7' (pen.); Johnson 90+11'; Olukolu 90+16'	Stadium: Parkside; Attendance: 1,000; Referee: Harry Phillips; Assistant referees: Marian Stoichitoiu & Matthew Charles; Fourth official: Richard Baker

29 April 2026	Billericay Town	3–2	Chatham Town	Billericay
19:45 GMT	Benton 12'; Merrifield 17'; Lewis-Burgess 41'	Report	Sene-Richardson 44'; Moynes 70'	Stadium: New Lodge; Attendance: 2,757; Referee: Fabio Roque; Assistant referees: Andreas Anastasiou & Matthew Pollington; Fourth official: Deryll David

==== Final ====
4 May 2026	Billericay Town	2–1 (a.e.t.)	Brentwood Town	Billericay
15:00 GMT	Long 21'; Watts 119'		Thomas 38'	Stadium: New Lodge; Attendance: 3,200; Referee: Henry Harvey; Assistant referees: Emre Arslan & Anthony Browne; Fourth official: John-Patrick Kane

=== Results table ===
Home \ Away	AVE	BIL	BRE	BHT	CAN	CAR	CHA	CHE	CHI	CVP	CRW	DAR	DUL	FOL	HSH	LEW	PBT	RAM	SAC	WEL	WHI	W&F
Aveley		3–3	1–1	3–3	3–1	0–0	0–2	3–0	2–2	3–0	2–3	1–1	2–1	2–5	3–1	3–0	2–0	5–0	1–1	2–1	4–2	2–0
Billericay Town	3–2		1–0	4–0	3–2	1–0	2–1	1–1	1–0	1–1	0–1	3–1	1–2	1–0	1–2	3–0	3–1	2–2	3–2	6–1	2–0	2–1
Brentwood Town	3–3	3–0		2–1	1–0	3–2	0–0	2–2	2–2	3–1	1–4	1–1	0–2	0–2	2–0	2–1	1–0	2–1	3–2	2–0	4–0	0–5
Burgess Hill Town	2–5	1–2	3–2		0–2	2–4	0–3	1–3	1–2	1–0	4–2	2–1	1–1	2–3	2–0	2–1	2–1	4–3	0–1	2–1	2–2	3–2
Canvey Island	1–2	1–0	3–2	0–1		2–2	0–1	1–4	3–1	2–2	1–1	0–4	1–1	0–2	1–3	0–1	3–1	2–4	1–3	1–3	2–1	1–1
Carshalton Athletic	1–1	1–0	2–4	1–2	3–1		0–4	3–3	0–3	0–1	2–2	2–2	1–1	0–0	2–2	1–2	2–0	1–2	1–0	2–1	2–2	4–1
Chatham Town	0–1	0–1	0–1	4–0	3–0	2–1		1–0	2–3	3–1	3–3	1–2	0–0	1–2	3–0	2–1	3–0	4–2	1–4	3–1	2–1	4–0
Cheshunt	2–0	2–2	0–1	1–1	2–0	0–1	0–4		2–0	1–1	1–1	0–1	1–1	2–4	3–1	0–0	4–1	0–3	2–2	4–2	0–0	2–3
Chichester City	0–1	2–2	2–5	0–2	3–0	2–1	2–2	2–2		0–3	3–1	2–2	0–0	1–1	1–0	3–0	1–3	1–2	1–1	1–2	2–1	2–2
Cray Valley Paper Mills	1–4	1–4	1–3	1–2	1–1	0–2	0–1	3–3	1–4		1–2	1–1	1–2	1–1	1–2	1–1	1–2	4–1	2–0	1–4	0–2	4–1
Cray Wanderers	0–3	3–4	1–5	3–3	2–0	1–1	1–1	2–1	0–0	5–0		0–2	4–2	1–1	4–3	3–0	1–0	1–1	1–1	2–3	1–2	3–2
Dartford	2–0	1–1	3–2	3–3	2–2	4–1	3–2	2–0	2–0	2–3	1–1		1–0	1–2	7–0	4–1	4–1	1–0	1–0	3–1	3–0	1–2
Dulwich Hamlet	3–3	0–1	1–2	2–0	2–0	2–1	1–0	0–1	3–1	1–3	1–1	4–0		0–2	1–1	1–4	4–1	0–0	4–2	3–1	4–3	0–3
Folkestone Invicta	0–1	2–1	1–0	1–1	2–0	3–3	1–2	5–3	3–0	3–0	8–1	2–2	2–2		1–0	6–0	2–1	3–2	2–1	2–0	4–1	4–0
Hashtag United	2–2	2–3	2–3	2–6	4–0	3–1	0–6	2–1	1–2	1–1	2–2	2–2	1–2	2–1		3–3	0–0	1–4	1–2	2–1	1–1	0–1
Lewes	1–6	0–3	4–2	3–0	2–2	2–3	0–2	2–1	0–1	0–1	2–2	1–0	2–1	0–5	0–2		2–1	2–2	1–0	1–0	3–0	1–1
Potters Bar Town	2–3	0–5	3–4	0–1	1–0	2–1	0–6	3–1	0–1	2–3	0–2	1–0	1–3	0–3	2–1	2–1		0–4	2–4	2–3	2–3	3–3
Ramsgate	1–1	0–1	3–0	2–4	2–0	2–2	1–0	1–1	3–1	0–1	1–1	4–4	0–2	2–3	0–2	3–0	2–1		1–1	1–2	3–2	1–1
St Albans City	0–1	2–0	2–3	3–4	4–1	2–1	0–0	1–2	1–2	5–0	2–3	2–0	1–0	1–2	4–1	3–0	1–2	2–0		2–1	3–5	2–0
Welling United	0–1	2–2	1–4	1–2	4–1	2–1	0–1	3–1	3–1	0–3	0–2	0–1	2–0	0–3	0–2	0–1	1–0	1–4	0–0		2–1	1–0
Whitehawk	0–1	0–0	2–1	3–1	1–1	2–0	0–0	1–3	0–0	3–2	0–3	1–2	1–0	2–2	3–2	3–1	1–1	2–2	1–1	1–2		1–1
Wingate & Finchley	0–2	2–2	1–2	1–2	2–0	2–2	0–3	2–3	0–0	1–0	1–2	3–1	0–1	0–1	2–1	3–0	2–1	0–1	2–0	1–1	0–1	

Source: Football Web Pages
Legend: Blue = home team win; Yellow = draw; Red = away team win.

=== Stadiums and locations ===
Locations of the Premier Division clubs
Greater London Premier Division football clubs

Club	Location	Stadium	Capacity
Aveley	Aveley	Parkside	3,500
Billericay Town	Billericay	New Lodge	4,800
Brentwood Town	Brentwood	The Brentwood Centre Arena	1,500
Burgess Hill Town	Burgess Hill	Leylands Park	2,500
Canvey Island	Canvey Island	Park Lane	4,100
Carshalton Athletic	London (Carshalton)	War Memorial Sports Ground	5,000
Chatham Town	Chatham, Kent	The Bauvill Stadium	5,000
Cheshunt	Cheshunt	Theobalds Lane	3,174
Chichester City	Chichester	Oaklands Park	2,000
Cray Valley Paper Mills	London (Eltham)	Badgers Sports Ground	1,550
Cray Wanderers	London (Chislehurst)	Flamingo Park	2,500
Dartford	Dartford	Princes Park	4,100
Dulwich Hamlet	London (East Dulwich)	Champion Hill	3,334
Folkestone Invicta	Folkestone	Cheriton Road	4,000
Hashtag United	Aveley	Parkside (groundshare with Aveley)	3,500
Lewes	Lewes	The Dripping Pan	3,000
Potters Bar Town	Potters Bar	Parkfield	2,000
Ramsgate	Ramsgate	Southwood Stadium	3,500
St Albans City	St Albans	Clarence Park	5,007
Welling United	London (Welling)	Park View Road	4,000
Whitehawk	Brighton (Whitehawk)	The Enclosed Ground	3,126
Wingate & Finchley	London (Finchley)	The Maurice Rebak Stadium	2,638

=== Statistics ===
Top Goalscorer
Rank	Player	Team	Goals
1.	(England) Jake Hutchinson	Folkestone Invicta	24
2.	(England) Alex Hernandez	Cray Wanderers	21
3.	(England) Daniel Ogunleye	Brentwood Town	20
4.	(England) Leo Sery	St Albans City	17
5.	(England) Olly Box	Dartford	16
5.	(England) Max Fiddes	Canvey Island/Burgess Hill Town/Cray Wanderers	16

=== Attendances ===
Rank	Team	Average	Highest	Lowest
1.	Dulwich Hamlet	2,226	3,334 vs St Albans City	628 vs Whitehawk
2.	Chatham Town	1,443	3,049 vs Dartford	723 vs Chichester City
3.	Folkestone Invicta	1,328	2,592 vs Ramsgate	304 vs St Albans City
4.	Ramsgate	1,236	2,268 vs Folkestone Invicta	812 vs Potters Bar Town
5.	St Albans City	1,212	2,314 vs Folkestone Invicta	375 vs Burgess Hill Town
6.	Dartford	1,067	1,525 vs Welling United	704 vs Burgess Hill Town
7.	Billericay Town	1,039	1,897 vs Brentwood Town	455 vs Chatham Town
8.	Lewes	846	1,580 vs Whitehawk	351 vs Billericay Town
9.	Burgess Hill Town	825	1,492 vs Wingate & Finchley	448 vs Canvey Island
10.	Welling United	716	1,479 vs Dartford	329 vs Folkestone Invicta
11.	Cray Wanderers	672	1,254 vs Cray Valley Paper Mills	351 vs Canvey Island
12.	Brentwood Town	633	1,574 vs Billericay Town	250 vs Cheshunt
13.	Carshalton Athletic	571	1,125 vs St Albans City	295 vs Cheshunt
14.	Aveley	459	733 vs Brentwood Town	324 vs Wingate & Finchley
15.	Cheshunt	368	493 vs Potters Bar Town	207 vs Canvey Island
16.	Chichester City	350	521 vs Dartford	133 vs Cheshunt
17.	Potters Bar Town	336	723 vs St Albans City	178 vs Chichester City
18.	Canvey Island	322	702 vs Billericay Town	157 vs Chichester City
19.	Whitehawk	320	580 vs Dulwich Hamlet	133 vs Brentwood Town
20.	Cray Valley Paper Mills	316	580 vs Dartford	178 vs Canvey Island
21.	Wingate & Finchley	230	391 vs Welling United	101 vs Burgess Hill Town
22.	Hashtag United	212	479 vs Aveley	107 vs Whitehawk

== North Division ==
Isthmian League North Division
- Season: 2025–26
- Champions: Maldon & Tiptree
- Promoted: Maldon & Tiptree; Stanway Rovers
- Relegated: Brantham Athletic; Heybridge Swifts; Downham Town; Mildenhall Town
- Matches: 462
- Goals: 1,381 (2.99 per match)
- Top goalscorer: Freddie Sears (29 goals)
- Biggest home win: Grays Athletic 6–0 Brantham Athletic (4 November 2025); Maldon & Tiptree 6–0 Waltham Abbey (8 November 2025)
- Biggest away win: Witham Town 0–5 Walthamstow (23 September 2025); Felixstowe & Walton United 2–7 Waltham Abbey (29 November 2025); Brantham Athletic 1–6 Cambridge City (25 April 2026); Heybridge Swifts 0–5 Stanway Rovers (25 April 2026)
- Highest scoring: Felixstowe & Walton United 2–7 Waltham Abbey (29 November 2025)
- Highest attendance: 1,596; Maldon & Tiptree vs Heybridge Swifts (27 December 2025)
- Lowest attendance: 28; Takeley vs Downham Town (3 February 2026)

The North Division comprises 22 teams. Sixteen teams competed in the previous season in the division.

=== Team changes ===
To the North Division

Promoted from the Eastern Counties League Premier Division

- Brantham Athletic
- Downham Town

Promoted from the Essex Senior League

- Stanway Rovers
- Takeley

Relegated from the Premier Division

- Bowers & Pitsea

Relegated from the Southern League Premier Division Central

- Lowestoft Town

From the North Division

Promoted to the Premier Division

- Brentwood Town

Promoted to the Southern League Premier Division Central

- Bury Town

Relegated to the Eastern Counties League Premier Division

- Ipswich Wanderers

Relegated to the Essex Senior League

- Basildon United
- Sporting Bengal United

Relegated to the Spartan South Midlands League Premier Division

- Haringey Borough

=== North Division table ===
Pos	Team	Pld	W	D	L	GF	GA	GD	Pts	Promotion, qualification or relegation
1	Maldon & Tiptree (C, P)	42	30	7	5	97	33	+64	97	Promotion to the Premier Division
2	Felixstowe & Walton United	42	30	7	5	90	37	+53	97	Qualification for the play-offs
3	Waltham Abbey	42	24	8	10	88	50	+38	80	Qualification for the play-offs, then transferred to the Southern League Division One Central
4	Stanway Rovers (O, P)	42	22	11	9	70	44	+26	77	Qualification for the play-offs
5	Redbridge	42	21	8	13	83	65	+18	71	Qualification for the play-offs
6	Gorleston	42	22	5	15	70	67	+3	71	
7	Bowers & Pitsea	42	19	11	12	85	53	+32	68	
8	Wroxham	42	19	10	13	54	47	+7	67	
9	Witham Town	42	17	11	14	68	59	+9	62	
10	Walthamstow	42	16	10	16	68	62	+6	58	
11	Tilbury	42	15	13	14	57	54	+3	58	
12	Cambridge City	42	14	14	14	58	49	+9	56	
13	Concord Rangers	42	16	8	18	62	64	−2	56	
14	Brightlingsea Regent	42	16	8	18	61	63	−2	56	
15	Newmarket Town	42	15	9	18	69	69	0	54	
16	Lowestoft Town	42	14	7	21	62	84	−22	49	
17	Takeley	42	13	8	21	43	72	−29	47	
18	Grays Athletic	42	12	8	22	44	60	−16	44	
19	Mildenhall Town (R)	42	12	5	25	53	81	−28	41	Relegation to the Eastern Counties League Premier Division
20	Downham Town (R)	42	8	13	21	43	72	−29	37	Relegation to the Eastern Counties League Premier Division
21	Heybridge Swifts (R)	42	7	7	28	29	85	−56	28	Relegation to the Essex Senior League
22	Brantham Athletic (R)	42	4	4	34	27	111	−84	16	Relegation to the Eastern Counties League Premier Division

Source: Isthmian League
Rules for classification: 1) points; 2) goal difference; 3) number of goals scored; 4) number of matches won; 5) head-to-head results
(C) Champions; (O) Play-off winners; (P) Promoted; (R) Relegated

=== Play-offs ===
Semi-finals
2	Felixstowe & Walton United	2
5	Redbridge	3
3	Waltham Abbey	1
4	Stanway Rovers	2

Final
4	Stanway Rovers	0 (4)
5	Redbridge	0 (2)

==== Semifinals ====
28 April 2026	Felixstowe & Walton United	2–3	Redbridge	Felixstowe
19:45 GMT	Ford 55'; Brown 84'	Report	Thomas-Fraser 7'; Brown-Bampoe 51', 58'	Stadium: Dellwood Avenue; Attendance: 622; Referee: Matthew Friend; Assistant referees: George Lowe & Andrew Denikiewicz; Fourth official: Josh Crofts

28 April 2026	Waltham Abbey	1–2	Stanway Rovers	Waltham Abbey
19:45 GMT	Brown 35'	Report	Mardell 57'; Bethmann 79'	Stadium: Capershotts; Attendance: 620; Referee: Joe Burgess; Assistant referees: Jordan Whitworth & Benjamin Kelly; Fourth official: Craig Wood

==== Final ====
2 May 2026	Stanway Rovers	0–0 (a.e.t.) (4–2 p)	Redbridge	Stanway
15:00 GMT		Report		Stadium: Hawthorns; Attendance: 1,043; Referee: Nick Reece; Assistant referees: Harvey Newstead & Samuel Palmer; Fourth official: Steven Marr

=== Results table ===
Home \ Away	B&P	BRA	BRI	CAM	CON	DOW	F&W	GOR	GRA	HEY	LOW	M&T	MIL	NEW	RED	STR	TAK	TIL	WAB	WSW	WIT	WRO
Bowers & Pitsea	—	4–0	5–0	4–2	4–2	1–2	2–2	1–0	1–2	1–1	3–2	1–2	5–0	0–0	0–2	2–2	5–1	1–0	3–1	1–0	1–1	2–0
Brantham Athletic	0–4	—	0–3	1–6	0–3	2–1	0–4	1–3	1–3	0–0	1–0	2–4	2–3	0–4	0–1	0–2	0–0	2–2	1–3	2–3	1–2	0–2
Brightlingsea Regent	1–0	0–1	—	0–0	0–1	4–0	3–4	3–3	0–1	3–0	4–1	3–2	2–1	1–2	0–2	0–1	4–0	2–2	2–0	3–0	1–4	1–0
Cambridge City	2–3	2–0	0–0	—	0–1	2–2	0–2	3–2	0–0	3–0	1–2	0–2	0–0	3–0	1–2	1–1	3–1	3–0	1–0	2–0	1–2	0–0
Concord Rangers	1–1	5–1	1–1	0–4	—	3–0	0–4	2–3	3–1	3–1	2–2	0–1	2–0	3–1	4–1	1–1	1–0	1–1	1–1	3–2	2–1	0–1
Downham Town	0–4	2–1	1–3	1–2	0–0	—	0–2	0–2	1–0	2–0	0–2	2–2	1–2	0–4	1–2	2–2	1–1	1–1	2–2	0–0	1–0	1–1
Felixstowe & Walton United	0–0	1–0	3–0	2–2	3–1	0–0	—	4–0	5–1	0–0	2–0	2–1	3–0	2–0	2–0	3–0	4–0	0–2	2–7	1–1	2–0	2–0
Gorleston	1–0	2–0	2–1	1–0	2–1	1–0	1–3	—	3–1	2–0	2–1	1–3	2–1	3–2	3–0	1–4	1–3	3–0	1–3	1–1	3–2	0–0
Grays Athletic	2–0	6–0	2–0	1–1	1–0	4–3	0–3	2–1	—	0–2	1–2	0–2	3–1	0–3	0–2	0–1	3–0	0–1	0–1	1–1	0–0	1–0
Heybridge Swifts	2–5	1–0	1–0	1–1	2–1	0–2	1–2	0–2	1–0	—	2–2	0–4	1–1	2–1	1–5	0–5	0–1	1–2	0–2	1–3	2–3	0–1
Lowestoft Town	3–2	5–2	4–1	2–3	1–3	2–1	1–4	2–2	3–0	2–0	—	1–1	2–0	1–2	1–3	0–4	1–3	3–2	1–2	0–4	0–2	3–1
Maldon & Tiptree	3–0	3–0	3–0	2–0	3–2	1–0	4–0	4–1	3–1	1–0	2–1	—	3–1	4–0	5–1	1–1	1–1	2–0	6–0	5–1	4–0	0–0
Mildenhall Town	2–2	2–1	1–3	3–1	2–1	1–1	1–2	1–3	3–1	1–2	1–0	0–1	—	1–2	0–1	1–2	6–1	2–1	3–2	1–3	2–3	0–2
Newmarket Town	2–1	3–1	1–2	2–1	1–2	4–1	0–2	1–2	1–1	2–1	4–1	1–1	4–1	—	1–2	1–3	1–1	1–3	0–2	4–4	1–0	0–3
Redbridge	2–1	2–0	0–0	3–0	4–3	1–1	1–2	6–1	4–3	0–0	4–2	0–1	3–4	2–2	—	1–2	1–2	4–3	0–0	2–3	1–3	1–2
Stanway Rovers	1–2	1–1	5–2	1–1	1–0	2–3	2–2	1–0	1–1	4–0	4–0	1–0	0–1	0–3	3–3	—	1–0	2–0	2–1	0–0	2–0	0–1
Takeley	0–3	0–1	2–1	1–2	1–1	1–2	2–3	0–3	1–0	3–2	5–0	1–2	1–1	1–0	0–2	1–0	—	2–3	1–1	2–1	0–1	2–0
Tilbury	2–2	3–0	2–0	0–0	2–0	1–1	0–1	1–0	1–0	2–0	0–0	1–3	1–0	1–1	1–3	1–2	3–0	—	0–0	2–2	1–1	2–0
Waltham Abbey	3–2	4–0	1–1	1–2	4–0	3–2	1–0	5–2	2–0	4–0	1–2	3–1	3–1	3–3	2–0	1–0	5–0	4–1	—	1–0	2–1	3–0
Walthamstow	2–2	3–0	1–2	2–1	1–2	2–1	1–2	1–2	0–0	4–1	0–1	3–2	3–0	1–1	0–4	0–1	2–0	2–1	1–0	—	4–3	0–2
Witham Town	1–1	4–2	1–1	0–0	3–0	1–0	2–1	2–2	1–0	3–0	1–1	1–2	3–0	4–2	2–2	5–0	0–1	2–2	1–1	0–5	—	2–3
Wroxham	1–3	5–0	2–3	1–1	1–0	3–1	0–2	1–0	1–1	2–0	2–2	0–0	2–1	2–1	3–3	1–2	0–0	0–3	4–3	2–1	2–0	—

Source: Football Web Pages
Legend: Blue = home team win; Yellow = draw; Red = away team win.

=== Stadiums and locations ===
Locations of North Division clubs

Club	Location	Stadium	Capacity
Bowers & Pitsea	Pitsea	Len Salmon Stadium	3,500
Brantham Athletic	Brantham	Brantham Leisure Centre	1,200
Brightlingsea Regent	Brightlingsea	North Road	2,000
Cambridge City	Sawston	West Way	3,000
Concord Rangers	Canvey Island	Thames Road	3,300
Downham Town	Downham Market	Memorial Field	1,000
Felixstowe & Walton United	Felixstowe	Dellwood Avenue	2,160
Gorleston	Gorleston-on-Sea	Wellesley Recreation Ground (groundshare with Great Yarmouth Town)	3,600
Grays Athletic	Tilbury	Chadfields (groundshare with Tilbury)	4,000
Heybridge Swifts	Heybridge	Scraley Road	3,000
Lowestoft Town	Lowestoft	Crown Meadow	3,000
Maldon & Tiptree	Maldon	Wallace Binder Ground	2,800
Mildenhall Town	Mildenhall	Recreation Way	2,000
Newmarket Town	Newmarket	Cricket Field Road	2,750
Redbridge	Barkingside	Oakside Stadium	3,000
Stanway Rovers	Stanway	Hawthorns	1,500
Takeley	Takeley	Station Road	2,000
Tilbury	Tilbury	Chadfields	4,000
Waltham Abbey	Waltham Abbey	Capershotts	550
Walthamstow	London (Walthamstow)	Wadham Lodge	3,500
Witham Town	Witham	Spa Road	2,500
Wroxham	Wroxham	Trafford Park	2,500

== South Central Division ==
Isthmian League South Central Division
- Season: 2025–26
- Champions: Leatherhead
- Promoted: Leatherhead
- Relegated: Fareham Town; Horndean; Metropolitan Police
- Matches: 462
- Goals: 1,556 (3.37 per match)
- Top goalscorer: Connor Cullen; Nathan Hogan (both 27 goals)
- Biggest home win: Hanworth Villa 9–0 Horndean (17 January 2026)
- Biggest away win: Hayes & Yeading United 0–5 Leatherhead (25 November 2025); Raynes Park Vale 1–6 Leatherhead (17 March 2026)
- Highest scoring: AFC Portchester 4–5 Bognor Regis Town (9 August 2025); Hanworth Villa 9–0 Horndean (17 January 2026); Leatherhead 4–5 Binfield (17 January 2026); Moneyfields 6–3 Ascot United (7 March 2026)
- Highest attendance: 1,655; Bognor Regis Town vs Fareham Town (27 December 2026)
- Lowest attendance: 20; Metropolitan Police vs Ascot United (22 November 2025); Littlehampton Town vs Hayes & Yeading United (21 April 2026)

The South Central Division consists of 22 teams, 15 of which competed in the previous campaign.

=== Team changes ===
To the South Central Division

Promoted from the Combined Counties League Premier Division North

- Bedfont Sports
- Egham Town

Promoted from the Wessex League Premier Division

- AFC Portchester
- Fareham Town

Relegated from the Premier Division

- Bognor Regis Town
- Hendon

Transferred from the South East Division

- Littlehampton Town

From the South Central Division

Promoted to the Southern League Premier Division South

- Farnham Town
- Uxbridge

Transferred to the Southern League Division One Central

- Rayners Lane

Relegated to the Combined Counties League Premier Division North

- Ashford Town (Middlesex)

Relegated to the Combined Counties League Premier Division South

- Badshot Lea
- Sutton Common Rovers

Relegated to the Southern Combination League Premier Division

- Guernsey

=== South Central Division table ===
Pos	Team	Pld	W	D	L	GF	GA	GD	Pts	Promotion, qualification or relegation
1	Leatherhead (C, P)	42	30	6	6	102	43	+59	96	Promotion to the Premier Division
2	Westfield	42	26	6	10	90	55	+35	84	Qualification for the play-offs
3	Hanworth Villa (O, P)	42	23	12	7	86	38	+48	81	Qualification for the play-offs
4	Moneyfields	42	25	5	12	94	62	+32	80	Qualification for the play-offs
5	AFC Portchester	42	22	7	13	89	62	+27	73	Qualification for the play-offs
6	Southall	42	18	11	13	73	63	+10	65	
7	Egham Town	42	17	13	12	82	67	+15	64	
8	Harrow Borough	42	18	10	14	66	66	0	64	
9	Hayes & Yeading United	42	18	7	17	62	78	−16	61	
10	South Park	42	17	8	17	55	56	−1	59	Transferred to the South East Division
11	Bognor Regis Town	42	16	9	17	64	64	0	57	
12	Hartley Wintney	42	15	11	16	65	65	0	56	
13	Kingstonian	42	16	8	18	69	76	−7	56	
14	Raynes Park Vale	42	14	11	17	62	71	−9	53	
15	Bedfont Sports	42	13	11	18	61	67	−6	50	
16	Ascot United	42	15	4	23	71	75	−4	49	
17	Hendon	42	12	12	18	75	87	−12	48	
18	Binfield	42	14	6	22	65	78	−13	48	
19	Littlehampton Town	42	12	10	20	58	81	−23	46	Reprieve from relegation (Note: Littlehampton Town were reprieved from relegation due to the resignation and folding of Widnes from the Northern Premier League Premier Division.)
20	Metropolitan Police (R)	42	12	8	22	64	89	−25	44	Relegation to the Combined Counties League Premier Division South
21	Horndean (R)	42	7	10	25	51	115	−64	31	Relegation to the Wessex League Premier Division
22	Fareham Town (R)	42	6	7	29	52	98	−46	25	Relegation to the Wessex League Premier Division

Source: Isthmian League
Rules for classification: 1) points; 2) goal difference; 3) number of goals scored; 4) number of matches won; 5) head-to-head results
(C) Champions; (O) Play-off winners; (P) Promoted; (R) Relegated

=== Play-offs ===
Semi-finals
2	Westfield	1 (7)
5	AFC Portchester	1 (6)
3	Hanworth Villa	5
4	Moneyfields	1

Final
2	Westfield	0
3	Hanworth Villa	2

==== Semifinals ====
29 April 2026	Westfield	1–1 (a.e.t.) (7–6 p)	AFC Portchester	Westfield
19:45 GMT	Kayani 1'	Report	Pennery 3' (pen.)	Stadium: Woking Park; Attendance: 563; Referee: Adam Steele; Assistant referees: Robbie Maris & Stephen Williams; Fourth official: Abdulaziz Olol

29 April 2026	Hanworth Villa	5–1	Moneyfields	Hanworth
19:45 GMT	Ansah-Palmer 22', 43'; Chebby 28'; Mulley 84'; Ferdinand 90+13'	Report	Bridgman 12'	Stadium: Rectory Meadow; Attendance: 747; Referee: Jake Hillier; Assistant referees: Marcus Baxter & James Barry; Fourth official: Teddy Osborn

==== Final ====
3 May 2026	Westfield	0–2	Hanworth Villa	Westfield
15:00 GMT		Report	Wells 15' (pen.); Timberlake 70'	Stadium: Woking Park; Attendance: 1,497; Referee: Jamie Stevenson; Assistant referees: Jack Smith & Ethan Stacey; Fourth official: Redmond Egan

=== Results table ===
Home \ Away	POR	ASC	BED	BIN	BRT	EGH	FAR	HWV	HWB	HWY	H&Y	HEN	HOR	KIN	LEA	LIT	MET	MON	RPV	SPK	SHL	WES
AFC Portchester	—	2–0	4–0	1–1	4–5	5–1	0–0	0–2	0–3	5–0	5–0	2–1	1–1	3–2	0–3	1–1	2–1	4–0	2–0	3–0	1–2	2–3
Ascot United	1–2	—	0–1	3–1	2–2	0–3	5–0	1–3	4–1	0–0	5–2	0–3	5–2	1–2	1–2	3–1	2–3	3–1	2–1	2–0	2–0	0–2
Bedfont Sports	2–0	1–0	—	1–2	0–3	3–3	6–0	1–1	1–1	2–3	3–0	0–3	5–1	3–2	2–2	1–2	3–1	3–1	1–1	0–1	0–4	0–1
Binfield	2–4	3–1	1–1	—	1–2	0–1	4–1	0–0	1–2	2–1	3–2	2–0	1–4	0–1	2–3	1–0	1–3	4–4	0–3	3–0	1–2	0–0
Bognor Regis Town	1–2	2–1	1–2	3–0	—	1–1	2–1	0–1	1–1	2–1	3–1	0–1	2–4	2–0	0–2	1–4	3–0	0–4	1–1	1–0	1–0	1–1
Egham Town	1–1	2–4	0–0	3–2	2–2	—	5–2	0–0	0–2	5–2	1–1	1–2	6–1	4–1	1–3	2–2	2–0	3–0	0–2	3–1	2–2	3–2
Fareham Town	2–3	1–0	4–3	1–3	1–1	1–2	—	1–3	1–2	3–2	1–3	1–4	1–1	0–3	1–2	1–1	5–1	2–2	1–2	2–2	0–1	0–1
Hanworth Villa	1–0	1–1	2–3	3–1	2–1	0–1	3–0	—	4–1	2–1	0–1	2–2	9–0	4–0	3–3	3–0	2–0	3–1	2–1	1–1	2–0	0–2
Harrow Borough	3–0	1–2	2–1	1–0	2–1	2–2	2–1	2–5	—	1–1	1–0	3–0	2–3	3–0	0–2	3–0	2–0	2–3	1–4	1–0	1–1	3–3
Hartley Wintney	0–2	1–1	0–0	1–0	1–1	2–1	4–2	1–2	1–2	—	3–0	3–0	7–1	0–1	0–0	0–0	1–2	0–3	1–1	1–2	3–1	2–1
Hayes & Yeading United	3–1	1–3	3–1	6–1	2–1	2–0	4–3	1–3	1–2	0–3	—	2–1	1–1	3–1	0–5	1–0	2–1	0–1	2–0	0–0	1–1	0–0
Hendon	2–4	2–1	1–1	3–2	1–4	2–2	7–1	0–0	0–1	1–2	2–1	—	1–0	0–4	1–1	3–3	3–4	2–2	4–4	0–1	4–4	1–2
Horndean	0–3	0–2	1–1	0–3	1–1	2–3	2–1	1–5	1–1	2–2	2–2	3–3	—	1–3	0–3	0–4	1–0	1–5	1–0	0–2	2–3	1–3
Kingstonian	3–3	4–2	2–1	2–1	3–1	1–0	4–2	2–1	0–0	2–2	1–2	3–1	1–2	—	1–2	1–2	2–2	3–4	1–1	1–0	0–3	2–3
Leatherhead	2–3	4–0	2–0	4–5	3–2	3–1	2–1	2–1	1–0	0–1	1–2	2–2	3–2	3–0	—	3–0	1–1	0–1	1–0	3–0	5–2	2–3
Littlehampton Town	3–2	1–0	3–2	0–4	2–0	0–4	0–4	2–2	3–3	3–1	0–1	1–2	4–0	2–2	0–2	—	0–1	0–3	3–0	0–1	1–1	0–3
Metropolitan Police	1–2	2–1	2–3	3–3	0–1	2–2	1–3	0–4	3–1	2–2	1–2	5–1	4–2	2–1	1–4	3–1	—	2–2	2–1	1–1	0–3	1–3
Moneyfields	0–3	6–3	2–0	2–0	3–2	0–1	1–0	0–1	4–2	1–4	4–4	5–1	1–0	3–0	0–1	4–0	3–0	—	3–1	4–2	1–0	4–1
Raynes Park Vale	3–0	1–4	1–0	0–1	3–2	3–3	2–0	2–2	1–1	3–2	1–2	0–0	0–0	2–1	1–6	3–3	3–2	1–0	—	0–4	2–0	3–2
South Park	0–2	2–1	0–1	2–0	0–1	2–3	1–0	1–1	3–0	0–1	3–0	3–2	3–2	1–1	0–2	2–3	3–2	2–1	3–2	—	3–3	2–0
Southall	2–1	2–1	1–1	1–2	0–3	1–0	0–0	0–0	2–1	6–1	2–1	1–4	5–2	2–2	2–4	3–1	4–1	0–2	2–1	1–1	—	2–0
Westfield	4–4	4–1	3–1	3–1	3–0	3–1	1–0	1–0	4–1	0–1	7–0	4–2	3–0	2–3	0–3	4–2	1–1	1–3	3–1	1–0	2–1	—

Source: Football Web Pages
Legend: Blue = home team win; Yellow = draw; Red = away team win.

=== Stadiums and locations ===
Locations of South Central Division clubs
Greater London South Central Division clubs
Hampshire South Central Division clubs

Club	Location	Stadium	Capacity
AFC Portchester	Portchester	Onsite Group Stadium	1,500
Ascot United	Ascot	The Racecourse Ground	1,150
Bedfont Sports	Bedfont	Bedfont Recreation Ground	3,000
Binfield	Binfield	Hill Farm Lane	1,000
Bognor Regis Town	Bognor Regis	Nyewood Lane	4,500
Egham Town	Egham	Runnymede Stadium	5,500
Fareham Town	Fareham	Cams Alders Football Stadium	4,500
Hanworth Villa	Hanworth	Rectory Meadow	1,000
Harrow Borough	Harrow	Earlsmead Stadium	3,070
Hartley Wintney	Hartley Wintney	The Memorial Playing Fields	2,000
Hayes & Yeading United	Hayes, Hillingdon	SkyEx Community Stadium	3,000
Hendon	London (Hendon)	Silver Jubilee Park	1,990
Horndean	Horndean	Five Heads Park	2,000
Kingstonian	Kingston upon Thames	Imperial Fields (groundshare with Tooting & Mitcham United)	3,500
Leatherhead	Leatherhead	Fetcham Grove	2,000
Littlehampton Town	Littlehampton	The Sportsfield	4,000
Metropolitan Police	East Molesey	Imber Court	3,000
Moneyfields	Portsmouth	John Jenkins Stadium	1,180
Raynes Park Vale	Raynes Park	Grand Drive	1,900
South Park	Reigate	King George's Field	2,000
Southall	Stanwell	Skyex Community Stadium (groundshare with Hayes & Yeading United)	3,000
Westfield	Woking (Westfield)	Woking Park	1,500

== South East Division ==
Isthmian League South East Division
- Season: 2025–26
- Champions: Three Bridges
- Promoted: Three Bridges; AFC Whyteleafe
- Relegated: East Grinstead Town; Beckenham Town; VCD Athletic; Hassocks
- Matches: 462
- Goals: 1,639 (3.55 per match)
- Top goalscorer: Noel Leighton (31 goals)
- Biggest home win: Deal Town 9–0 East Grinstead Town (3 March 2026)
- Biggest away win: East Grinstead Town 0–8 AFC Whyteleafe (24 February 2026)
- Highest scoring: Erith Town 3–7 Margate (15 November 2025)
- Highest attendance: 1,501; Jersey Bulls vs Hastings United (25 April 2026)
- Lowest attendance: 62; VCD Athletic vs Three Bridges (21 October 2025)

The South East Division will consist of 22 teams for the first time, fifteen of which competed in the previous season.

=== Team changes ===
To the South East Division

Promoted from the Combined Counties League Premier Division South

- AFC Whyteleafe
- Jersey Bulls

Promoted from the Southern Combination League Premier Division

- Crowborough Athletic
- Hassocks

Promoted from the Southern Counties East League Premier Division

- Faversham Town
- VCD Athletic

Relegated from the Premier Division

- Hastings United

From the South East Division

Promoted to the Premier Division

- Burgess Hill Town
- Ramsgate

Relegated to the Southern Combination League Premier Division

- Lancing
- Steyning Town

Relegated to the Southern Counties East League Premier Division

- Hythe Town
- Phoenix Sports

Transferred to the South Central Division

- Littlehampton Town

=== South East Division table ===
Pos	Team	Pld	W	D	L	GF	GA	GD	Pts	Promotion, qualification or relegation
1	Three Bridges (C, P)	42	30	6	6	124	44	+80	96	Promotion to the Premier Division
2	AFC Croydon Athletic	42	26	7	9	96	58	+38	85	Qualification for the play-offs
3	Jersey Bulls	42	24	12	6	81	35	+46	84	Qualification for the play-offs, then transferred to the South Central Division
4	AFC Whyteleafe (O, P)	42	25	8	9	109	46	+63	83	Qualification for the play-offs
5	Sittingbourne	42	23	10	9	86	50	+36	79	Qualification for the play-offs
6	Margate	42	22	9	11	87	63	+24	75	
7	Faversham Town	42	20	14	8	86	58	+28	74	
8	Deal Town	42	21	6	15	91	66	+25	69	
9	Ashford United	42	20	7	15	92	67	+25	67	
10	Merstham	42	17	9	16	73	65	+8	60	
11	Eastbourne Town	42	16	8	18	63	77	−14	56	
12	Sevenoaks Town	42	16	7	19	72	80	−8	55	
13	Herne Bay	42	15	10	17	63	75	−12	55	
14	Crowborough Athletic	42	16	7	19	63	84	−21	55	
15	Broadbridge Heath	42	15	5	22	80	90	−10	50	
16	Erith Town	42	12	12	18	65	81	−16	47 (Note: Erith Town were deducted 1 point for fielding an ineligible player.)	
17	Hastings United	42	13	7	22	55	70	−15	46	
18	Sheppey United	42	12	8	22	63	95	−32	44	
19	Hassocks (R)	42	11	8	23	53	79	−26	41	Relegation to the Southern Combination League Premier Division
20	Beckenham Town (R)	42	8	11	23	53	94	−41	35	Relegation to the Southern Counties East League Premier Division
21	VCD Athletic	42	8	8	26	54	101	−47	32	Club folded
22	East Grinstead Town (R)	42	1	3	38	30	161	−131	6	Relegation to the Southern Combination League Premier Division

Source: Football Web Pages
Rules for classification: 1) points; 2) goal difference; 3) number of goals scored; 4) number of matches won; 5) head-to-head results
(C) Champions; (O) Play-off winners; (P) Promoted; (R) Relegated

=== Play-offs ===
Semi-finals
2	AFC Croydon Athletic	2
5	Sittingbourne	0
3	Jersey Bulls	0 (3)
4	AFC Whyteleafe	0 (4)

Final
2	AFC Croydon Athletic	1 (4)
4	AFC Whyteleafe	1 (5)

==== Semifinals ====
28 April 2026	AFC Croydon Athletic	2–0	Sittingbourne	Thornton Heath
19:45 GMT	Williams 20', 35'	Report		Stadium: Mayfield Stadium; Attendance: 728; Referee: Thomas Berry; Assistant referees: John Pike & Harry Scott; Fourth official: Scott Crowhurst

28 April 2026	Jersey Bulls	0–0 (3–4 p)	AFC Whyteleafe	St. Helier
19:45 GMT		Report		Stadium: Springfield Stadium; Attendance: 1,590; Referee: Adrian Harris; Assistant referees: Michael Jones & Thomas Murray; Fourth official: James Kerten

==== Final ====
1 May 2026	AFC Croydon Athletic	1–1 (a.e.t.) (4–5 p)	AFC Whyteleafe	Thornton Heath
19:45 GMT	Daniel 87' (pen.)	Report	Orome 67'	Stadium: Mayfield Stadium; Attendance: 1,262; Referee: Nicholas Dunn; Assistant referees: Thomas Reed & Ryan Hetherington; Fourth official: Kane Dempster

=== Results table ===
Home \ Away	ACA	WHY	ASH	BEC	BRO	CRW	DEA	EGT	EBN	ERI	FAV	HSK	HST	HER	JER	MAR	MER	SEV	SHE	SIT	THB	VCD
AFC Croydon Athletic		1–1	0–1	3–2	1–1	2–1	2–0	2–1	3–1	3–1	2–1	3–1	4–1	1–4	2–3	1–2	5–1	4–1	2–2	3–1	0–2	5–1
AFC Whyteleafe	2–4		3–2	4–0	2–1	8–0	3–1	5–0	3–0	3–3	0–3	2–1	2–0	4–1	0–0	0–2	2–0	4–0	4–0	1–2	0–2	2–2
Ashford United	3–2	2–4		3–1	6–1	0–1	2–1	7–0	2–1	3–3	1–0	3–2	1–0	1–2	1–1	3–3	1–2	2–2	1–1	3–1	1–2	5–2
Beckenham Town	0–2	1–4	1–1		1–3	2–1	1–2	4–0	0–7	1–1	2–2	0–1	1–3	3–1	0–1	0–2	1–4	3–1	0–2	2–2	1–6	2–2
Broadbridge Heath	0–3	1–3	2–5	1–2		5–1	0–2	5–0	5–0	2–0	1–3	2–4	2–4	0–0	2–1	2–3	2–0	1–3	5–4	1–7	2–1	4–1
Crowborough Athletic	0–2	0–3	2–1	2–0	2–2		1–4	3–1	1–1	3–0	0–4	3–1	3–1	1–3	1–2	2–2	5–2	2–0	1–3	1–2	2–3	3–1
Deal Town	1–2	0–1	1–0	3–1	3–3	5–1		9–0	6–3	5–1	4–1	1–1	3–0	4–1	0–1	2–2	2–3	2–0	1–3	1–3	3–2	0–1
East Grinstead Town	0–3	0–8	0–6	1–1	0–6	3–4	1–2		1–2	1–7	0–2	0–3	1–4	1–1	0–5	1–3	2–4	0–2	2–3	0–3	1–4	2–2
Eastbourne Town	0–0	0–2	1–0	1–1	2–1	1–0	3–2	4–1		0–3	0–0	1–0	3–3	3–1	0–1	1–2	1–0	2–2	3–1	2–0	0–5	2–3
Erith Town	1–4	0–2	0–0	1–2	1–0	0–2	1–1	7–1	1–2		0–0	1–1	1–3	1–2	2–2	3–7	2–2	1–1	2–1	0–3	1–0	1–0
Faversham Town	1–3	2–2	3–1	3–2	2–1	1–1	6–1	2–1	1–4	2–3		1–1	5–1	2–2	3–1	0–0	0–5	4–0	3–0	3–3	2–2	4–2
Hassocks	3–1	1–1	2–4	1–2	2–1	1–1	1–3	0–1	2–1	3–0	0–2		2–1	3–2	0–2	1–3	0–1	0–1	1–1	0–2	1–5	4–3
Hastings United	0–1	0–0	1–2	3–2	1–2	1–2	1–3	3–0	2–0	0–0	1–2	1–1		1–1	1–0	0–1	0–0	2–3	3–2	0–1	0–3	1–0
Herne Bay	0–4	2–2	0–4	4–2	2–2	0–0	1–2	4–1	1–0	2–3	1–1	1–1	4–0		0–4	1–3	2–1	0–1	4–2	1–1	1–4	2–0
Jersey Bulls	6–1	1–0	0–2	1–1	3–0	6–1	2–1	3–0	2–0	3–1	1–0	3–0	3–0	1–2		2–2	2–0	1–0	2–1	1–1	1–1	1–1
Margate	0–1	4–2	2–4	7–2	3–2	1–3	2–3	5–1	2–3	3–1	2–2	2–0	0–3	0–1	1–1		0–2	4–3	2–0	1–0	2–0	2–1
Merstham	1–2	1–3	2–1	2–1	2–1	1–2	1–1	7–2	1–1	1–2	0–1	2–1	2–0	1–2	2–2	1–1		5–2	1–2	1–2	1–1	4–0
Sevenoaks Town	0–2	2–1	1–2	1–1	1–2	1–0	2–3	4–2	3–1	1–2	2–2	4–2	2–0	5–2	0–1	1–1	1–4		3–0	1–0	0–5	2–3
Sheppey United	3–3	0–6	4–0	0–0	1–2	1–2	0–1	2–0	2–2	1–4	1–2	0–1	0–3	2–0	2–1	2–1	1–1	1–6		2–1	1–2	4–2
Sittingbourne	4–3	1–4	2–0	4–1	3–1	4–0	2–0	2–1	5–0	1–1	1–3	2–1	1–1	1–0	1–1	2–1	1–1	3–3	2–2		1–0	5–0
Three Bridges	3–3	3–2	5–4	1–1	4–0	1–0	3–1	5–0	5–0	5–1	2–4	4–0	4–2	2–0	2–2	3–0	5–0	2–1	7–1	2–1		4–0
VCD Athletic	1–1	0–4	3–1	0–2	1–3	2–2	1–1	3–0	1–4	2–1	1–1	5–2	0–3	0–2	0–4	0–1	0–1	1–3	6–2	0–2	0–2	

Source: Football Web Pages
Legend: Blue = home team win; Yellow = draw; Red = away team win.

=== Stadiums and locations ===
Locations of South East Division clubs
Greater London South East Division football clubs

Club	Location	Stadium	Capacity
AFC Croydon Athletic	Thornton Heath	Mayfield Stadium	3,000
AFC Whyteleafe	Whyteleafe	Church Road	2,000
Ashford United	Ashford, Kent	The Homelands	3,200
Beckenham Town	Beckenham	Eden Park Avenue	4,000
Broadbridge Heath	Broadbridge Heath	High Wood Hill Sports Ground	2,000
Crowborough Athletic	Crowborough	Crowborough Community Stadium	2,000
Deal Town	Deal	Charles Sports Ground	2,000
East Grinstead Town	East Grinstead	East Court	3,000
Eastbourne Town	Eastbourne	The Saffrons	3,000
Erith Town	Thamesmead	Bayliss Avenue	1,000
Faversham Town	Faversham	Salters Lane	2,000
Hassocks	Hassocks	The Beacon Ground	1,000
Hastings United	Hastings	The Pilot Field	4,050
Herne Bay	Herne Bay	Winch's Field	3,000
Jersey Bulls	St Helier, Jersey	Springfield Stadium	2,000
Margate	Margate	Hartsdown Park	2,100
Merstham	Merstham	Moatside	2,500
Sevenoaks Town	Sevenoaks	Greatness Park	1,500
Sheppey United	Isle of Sheppey	Holm Park	1,530
Sittingbourne	Sittingbourne	Woodstock Park	1,930
Three Bridges	Crawley (Three Bridges)	Jubilee Field	1,500
VCD Athletic	Crayford	Oakwood	1,180

== League Cup ==
The 2025–26 Velocity Trophy (formerly the Isthmian League Cup) is the 52nd season of the Alan Turvey Trophy, the cup competition of the whole Isthmian League.

Billericay Town were the defending champions, having beaten Chatham Town in the 2024–25 season.

=== First round ===
Tie	Home team (tier)	Score	Away team (tier)	Att.
1	Hassocks (SE)	2–3	Broadbridge Heath (SE)	230
2	Newmarket Town (N)	3–0	Wroxham (N)	122
3	Sheppey United (SE)	1–1 (5–4 p)	Margate (SE)	182
4	AFC Whyteleafe (SE)	5–3	Leatherhead (SC)	184
5	Concord Rangers (N)	1–3	Grays Athletic (N)	90
6	Fareham Town (SC)	1–2	AFC Portcheser (SC)	309
7	Crowborough Athletic (SE)	2–1	Hastings United (SE)	361
8	Kingstonian (SC)	4–2	Merstham (SE)	139
9	Brightlingsea Regent (N)	3–0	Brantham Athletic (N)	138
10	South Park (SC)	2–4	Three Bridges (SE)	87

=== Second round ===
Tie	Home team (tier)	Score	Away team (tier)	Att.
1	VCD Athletic (SE)	2–5	Walthamstow (N)	110
2	Ascot United (SC)	4–2	Raynes Park Vale (SC)	
3	Hayes & Yeading United (SC)	5–2	Southall (SC)	103
4	Herne Bay (SE)	0–1	Sheppey United (SE)	289
5	Binfield (SC)	2–1	Hartley Wintney (SC)	68
6	Broadbridge Heath (SE)	4–2	East Grinstead Town (SE)	91
7	Erith Town (SE)	3–2	Deal Town (SE)	60
8	Faversham Town (SE)	5–5 (3–4 p)	Ashford United (SE)	214
9	Bowers & Pitsea (N)	3–4	Newmarket Town (N)	99
10	Harrow Borough (SC)	4–1	Hendon (SC)	175
11	Stanway Rovers (N)	1–0	Takeley (N)	70
12	Brightlingsea Regent (N)	2–4	Witham Town (N)	116
13	Redbridge (N)	2–2 (7–6 p)	Grays Athletic (N)	104
14	AFC Croydon Athletic (SE)	3–4	AFC Whyteleafe (SE)	154
15	AFC Portchester (SC)	0–2	Egham Town (SC)	151
16	Crowborough Athletic (SE)	4–0	Sittingbourne (SE)	243
17	Kingstonian (SC)	4–1	Three Bridges (SE)	138

=== Third round ===
Tie	Home team (tier)	Score	Away team (tier)	Att.
1	Carshalton Athletic (P)	0–3	Binfield (SC)	94
2	Dulwich Hamlet (P)	4–0	Harrow Borough (SC)	300
3	Sheppey United (SE)	1–1 (1–4 p)	Crowborough Athletic (SE)	169
4	Aveley (P)	3–2	Witham Town (N)	151
5	Potters Bar Town (P)	4–4 (4–5 p)	Hayes & Yeading United (SC)	133
6	Redbridge (N)	4–1	Stanway Rovers (N)	42
7	Ascot United (SC)	5–3	Egham Town (SC)	113
8	Burgess Hill Town (P)	2–1	AFC Whyteleafe (SE)	238
9	Chatham Town (P)	3–2	Erith Town (SE)	328
10	Ramsgate (P)	4–1	Ashford United (SE)	444
11	St Albans City (P)	1–5	Cheshunt (P)	304
12	Walthamstow (N)	2–2 (2–4 p)	Wingate & Finchley (P)	78
13	Welling United (P)	3–1	Folkestone Invicta (P)	205
14	Broadbridge Heath (SE)	2–3	Kingstonian (SC)	110
15	Hashtag United (P)	4–0	Billericay Town (P)	150
16	Newmarket Town (N)	3–1	Brentwood Town (P)	93

=== Fourth round ===
Tie	Home team (tier)	Score	Away team (tier)	Att.
1	Aveley (P)	3–4	Redbridge (N)	95
2	Ascot United (SC)	1–3	Binfield (SC)	112
3	Ramsgate (P)	3–2	Welling United (P)	410
4	Wingate & Finchley (P)	4–1	Cheshunt (P)	68
5	Dulwich Hamlet (P)	2–3	Kingstonian (SC)	327
6	Hashtag United (P)	2–1	Newmarket Town (N)	88
7	Hayes & Yeading United (SC)	0–0 (7–8 p)	Burgess Hill Town (P)	89
8	Crowborough Athletic (SE)	1–0	Chatham Town (P)	235

=== Quarter-finals ===
Tie	Home team (tier)	Score	Away team (tier)	Att.
1	Burgess Hill Town (P)	1–5	Hashtag United (P)	206
2	Wingate & Finchley (P)	3–3 (5–3 p)	Kingstonian (SC)	85
3	Ramsgate (P)	5–0	Binfield (SC)	629
4	Crowborough Athletic (SE)	3–1	Redbridge (N)	63

=== Semi-finals ===
Tie	Home team (tier)	Score	Away team (tier)	Att.
1	Ramsgate (P)	1–0	Hashtag United (P)	1,310
2	Redbridge (N)	1–2	Wingate & Finchley (P)	88

=== Final ===
9 April 2026	Ramsgate (P)	0–1 (a.e.t.)	Wingate & Finchley (P)	Aveley
19:45 BST			Adebayo 109'	Stadium: Parkside; Attendance: 1,166
