= London Cup =

London Cup may refer to:

- London Senior Cup, association football cup
- London Charity Cup, association football cup
- London Challenge Cup, former Association football cup
- London War Cup, former Association football cup
- London Intermediate Cup, former Association football cup
- London Cup (speedway), former motorcycle speedway cup
- Women's London Cup, cricket competition
