= Cray Valley Paper Mills F.C. =

Association football club in England

Coordinates: 51°27′2″N 0°2′5″E

Cray Valley Paper Mills
- Full name: Cray Valley Paper Mills Football Club
- Nickname: The Millers
- Founded: 1919
- Ground: Badgers Sports Ground, Eltham
- Capacity: 1,550
- Chairman: David Carter
- Manager: Kevin Lisbie
- League: Isthmian League South East Division
- 2025–26: Isthmian League Premier Division, 19th of 22 (relegated)
- Website: crayvalleypmfc.com
Home colours	Away colours

Cray Valley Paper Mills Football Club is a football club currently based in Eltham, in the Royal Borough of Greenwich, England. They are currently members of the Isthmian League South East Division and play at the Badgers Sports Ground.

== History ==
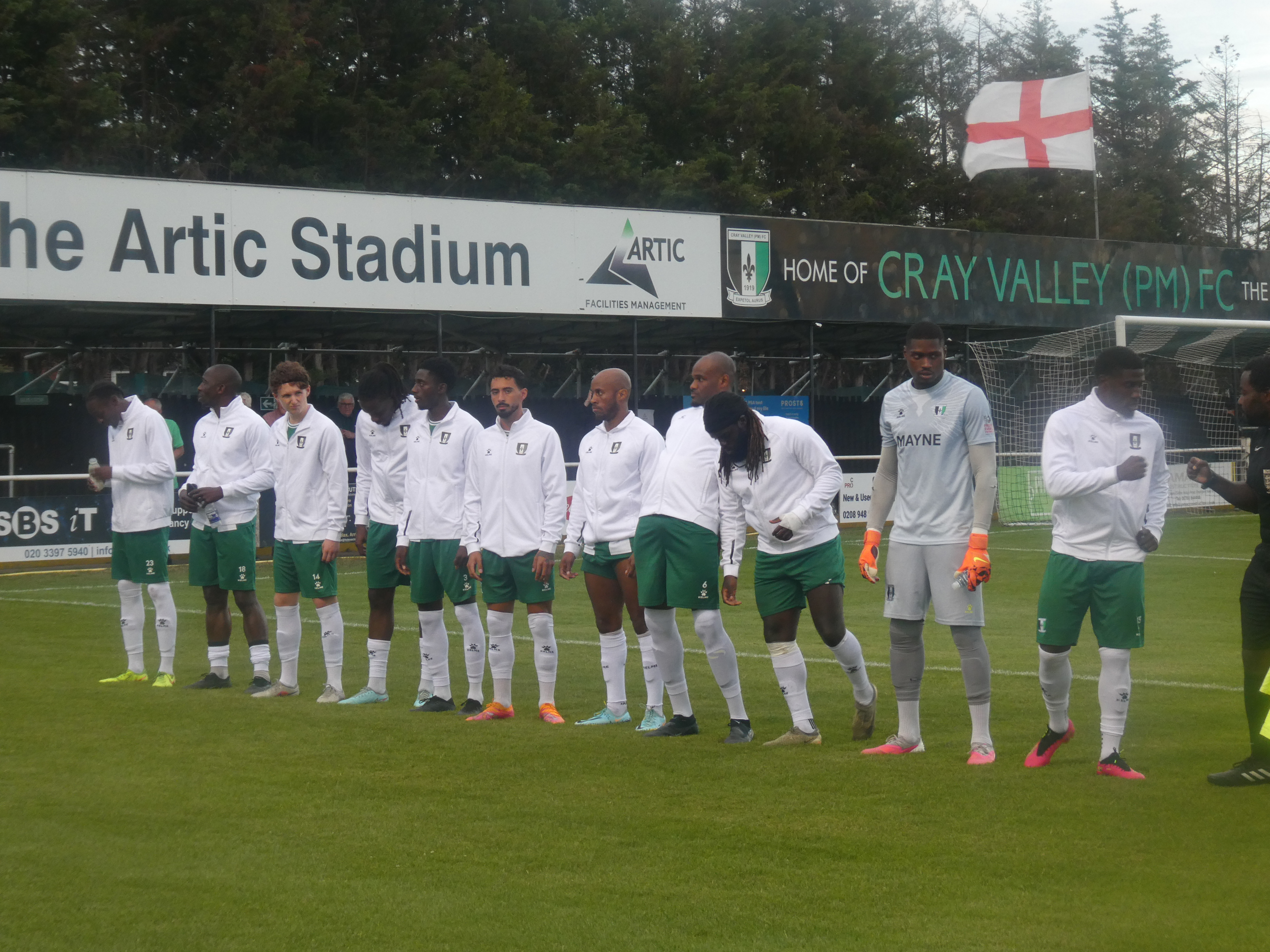
A line-up for the 2026–27 season

The club was established in 1919 and joined Division Two of the new Sidcup & Kent League. Playing in green and white, the colours of the mill's vehicles, their first match was played on 20 September 1919, a 1–0 win against Hamilton House. The club won the division at the first attempt, earning promotion to Division One of the Bromley & District League. In their second season they won the Kent Junior Cup. They later joined the Kent County Amateur League, winning Division Three of the western section in 1932–33 and finishing as runners-up in the division in 1936–37. The club left the league at the end of the 1954–55 season.

Cray Valley joined the South London Alliance in 1975. They were Division One champions in 1979–80 and won the Premier Division two seasons later. The club won Division One again in 1983–84, and finished as runners-up in the Premier Division in 1988–89. In 1991 they joined Division One of the Spartan League. When it merged with the South Midlands League to form the Spartan South Midlands League in 1997, the club were placed in Division One South. Despite finishing as runners-up in the league's first season, they left to become founder members of the London Intermediate League. However, in 2001 they left to rejoin the Kent County League, becoming members of Division One West.

In 2002–03 Cray Valley won Division One West, earning promotion to the Premier Division. Two seasons later they won the Premier Division. After finishing third in 2010–11, they moved up to the Kent League, which was renamed the Southern Counties East League in 2013. When the league gained a second division in 2016, the club became members of the Premier Division. In 2016–17 they won the London Senior Cup, beating Metropolitan Police 2–1 in the final, becoming the lowest-ranked team to ever win the trophy. They were also runners-up in the Kent Reliance Senior Trophy in the same season. However they were disqualified from the first round of the FA Vase for fielding an ineligible player, former Crystal Palace defender Matthew Parsons. The club reached the London Senior Cup final again the following season, but lost 4–1 to Balham.

The 2018–19 season saw Cray Valley reach the FA Vase final for the first time, in which they lost 3–1 after extra time to Chertsey Town at Wembley Stadium. They were also Southern Counties East League Premier Division champions, earning promotion to the South East Division of the Isthmian League. In 2020–21 the club reached the first round of the FA Cup for the first time, losing 1–0 at Havant & Waterlooville. They reached the first round again in 2023–24, when they were drawn away to local League One side Charlton Athletic. After a 1–1 draw at the Valley, they lost the replay 6–1. The season also saw the club win the South East Division title, earning promotion to the Premier Division.

In 2024–25 Cray Valley finished fourth in the Premier Division, qualifying for the promotion play-offs, in which they lost 4–3 to Dartford in the semi-finals. The following season saw the club finish fourth-from-bottom of the Premier Division, resulting in relegation back to the South East Division.

== Ground ==
The club originally played at the sports ground of the paper mills in St Paul's Cray. However, the mills closed in 1981 and the club then played at numerous grounds until moving permanently to the Badgers Sports Ground in Eltham in 1998. The ground includes a 100-seat stand on one side of the pitch and a small covered area on the other. In 2016 Greenwich Borough agreed a 30-year lease to share the ground. However, at the end of the 2018–19 season Greenwich Borough were evicted for failing to pay rent, and subsequently moved to the Phoenix Sports Ground in Barnehurst.

== Honours ==
- Isthmian League
  - South East Division champions 2023–24
- Southern Counties East League
  - Premier Division champions 2018–19
- Kent County League
  - Premier Division champions 2004–05
  - Division One West champions 2002–03
  - Division Three (Western Section) champions 1932–33
- South London Alliance
  - Premier Division winners 1980–81
  - Division One champions 1979–80, 1983–84
- Sidcup & Kent League
  - Division Two champions 1919–20
- London Senior Cup
  - Winners 2016–17
- London Intermediate Cup
  - Winners 2002–03, 2003–04, 2009–10, 2010–11
- Kent Intermediate Shield
  - Winners 2004–05
- Kent Junior Cup
  - Winners 1921–22, 1977–78, 1980–81
- West Kent Challenge Shield
  - Winners 2001–02

== Records ==
- Best FA Cup performance: First round, 2020–21, 2023–24
- Best FA Trophy performance: Second round, 2023–24
- Best FA Vase performance: Runners-up, 2018–19
- Record attendance: 1,550 vs Charlton Athletic, FA Cup first round replay, 15 November 2023

== See also ==
- Cray Valley Paper Mills F.C. players
- Cray Valley Paper Mills F.C. managers
