= Keon Lewis-Burgess =

English footballer (born 2006)

Personal information
- Full name: Keon Nico Lewis-Burgess
- Date of birth: 8 September 2006 (age 20)
- Place of birth: England
- Height: 1.78 m (5 ft 10 in)
- Positions: Centre-back; central midfielder

Team information
- Current team: Gateshead (on loan from Milton Keynes Dons)
- Number: 38

Youth career
- –2023: Milton Keynes Dons

Senior career*
Years	Team	Apps	(Gls)
2023–	Milton Keynes Dons	0	(0)
2024	→ Banbury United (loan)	5	(0)
2024	→ Dunstable (loan)	7	(0)
2025	→ Biggleswade Town (loan)	5	(2)
2025–2026	→ Billericay Town (loan)	29	(1)
2026–	→ Gateshead (loan)	11	(0)
- * Club domestic league appearances and goals

Keon Nico Lewis-Burgess (born 8 September 2006) is a professional footballer who plays as a midfielder for National League side Gateshead, on loan from EFL League One club Milton Keynes Dons.

== Club career ==
=== Milton Keynes Dons ===
Lewis-Burgess joined the academy of Milton Keynes Dons at a young age. He progressed through various academy age groups. He started a two-year scholarship at the start of the 2023–24 campaign. He made his first-team debut on 21 November 2023, playing 78 minutes in a 3–2 win against Northampton Town in an EFL Trophy fixture at the Stadium MK. Lewis-Burgess was later loaned out to Banbury United, Dunstable, and Biggleswade Town during the 2024–25 season.

On 4 November 2025, Lewis-Burgess joined Isthmian League Premier Division side Billericay Town on loan for a month, he made his debut later the same day as he came off the bench during a 2–1 win against Chatham Town. On 1 December 2025, Lewis-Burgess' loan stay was extended until 4 January 2026, the deal was then extended until the end of the season on 4 March 2026. He went onto make 32 appearances across all competitions for The Blues, scoring twice; as Billericay Town earned promotion back to the National League South after beating Brentwood Town 2–1 after extra time in the Play–Off Final.

On 14 August 2026, Lewis-Burgess joined National League club Gateshead on loan until January 2027.

== Career statistics ==
As of 3 October 2026

Appearances and goals by club, season and competition
Club	Season	League			FA Cup		EFL Cup		Other		Total	
Club	Season	Division	Apps	Goals	Apps	Goals	Apps	Goals	Apps	Goals	Apps	Goals
Milton Keynes Dons	2023–24	League Two	0	0	0	0	0	0	2 (Note: Appearance(s) in EFL Trophy)	0	2	0
Milton Keynes Dons	2024–25	League Two	0	0	0	0	0	0	2	0	2	0
Milton Keynes Dons	2025–26	League Two	0	0	0	0	0	0	2	0	2	0
Milton Keynes Dons	2026–27	League One	0	0	0	0	0	0	0	0	0	0
Total			0	0	0	0	0	0	6	0	6	0
Banbury United (loan)	2024–25	Southern Football League; Premier Division Central	5	0	0	0	—		0	0	5	0
Dunstable (loan)	2024–25	Southern Football League; Division One Central	7	0	0	0	—		1 (Note: Appearances in Bedfordshire Senior Cup)	0	8	0
Biggleswade Town (loan)	2024–25	Southern Football League; Premier Division Central	5	2	0	0	—		0	0	5	2
Billericay Town (loan)	2025–26	Isthmian League; Premier Division	29	1	0	0	—		3 (Note: One appearance in Velocity Cup, two appearances and one goal in Isthmian League Premier Division play-offs)	1	32	2
Gateshead (loan)	2026–27	National League	11	0	0	0	—		1 (Note: Appearance(s) in National League Cup)	0	12	0
Career total			57	3	0	0	0	0	11	1	68	4

== Honours ==
Billericay Town

- Isthmian League play-offs: 2026
