= London Intermediate Cup =

- Organising body: London FA
- Founded: 1914
- Abolished: 2008; 17 years ago
- Region: London
- Last champions: Metrogas (4th title)
- Most successful club(s): Hendon reserves Walthamstow Avenue reserves (5 titles each)

The London Intermediate Cup is the County Intermediate Cup of the London FA. The London Intermediate Cup was first won by Barking in 1914–15.

== Finals ==
This section lists every final of the competition played since 1914–15, the winners, the runners-up, and the result.

=== Key ===
Match went to a replay
Match decided by a penalty shootout after extra time

Season	Winners	Result	Runner-up	Notes
1914–15	Barking	2–1	Clapton Warwick	
1915–1920	No competition due to World War I.			
1920–21	Old Johnians	2–0	Dulwich Hamlet reserves	
1921–22	Mitcham Wanderers	5–3	Wall End United	
1922–23	Hay's Wharf	5–2	Wimbledon reserves	
1923–24	Tottenham Avondale	1–0	Wellington Athletic	
1924–25	Lyons	3–0	Siemens Sports	
1925–26	Summerstown reserves	2–0	Tottenham G.A.S.	
1926–27	Lamorbey	2–1	Clevedon United	
1927–28	London Caledonians reserves	4–2	Eagle Park (Chadwell Heath)	
1928–29	Metropolitan Police reserves	3–2	London Public Omnibus Co.	
1929–30	South Suburban Gas	3–2	Enfield reserves	
1930–31	Enfield reserves	3–0	Ilford reserves	
1931–32	Walthamstow Avenue reserves	1–0	Gothic	
1932–33	Finchley reserves	1–0	Royal Ordnance Factories	
1933–34	Millwall Albion	3–1	Finchley reserves	
1934–35	Colney Hatch Mental Hospital	3–1	Ealing Celtic	
1935–36	Potter & Clarke	2–0	Tottenham Argyle	
1936–37	Leyton reserves	1–0	Gaslight (Beckton)	
1937–38	Walthamstow Avenue reserves	4–2	Gaslight (Beckton)	
1938–39	Walthamstow Avenue reserves	2–0	Lyle Sports	
1939–1946	No competition due to World War II.			
1946–47	Barnet reserves	4–3	Walthamstow Avenue reserves	
1947–48	Leyton reserves	1–1	Bromley reserves	Original final.
1947–48	Leyton reserves	2–1	Bromley reserves	Replay.
1948–49	Leyton reserves	2–1	Chislehurst Athletic	
1949–50	Tooting & Mitcham United reserves	3–1	Southall reserves	
1950–51	Tooting & Mitcham United reserves	5–2	Bromley reserves	
1951–52	Wimbledon reserves	1–0	Port of London Authority	
1952–53	Barking reserves	3–1	Barnet reserves	
1953–54	Walthamstow Avenue reserves	2–0	Leytonstone reserves	
1954–55	Walthamstow Avenue reserves	3–1	Briggs Sports reserves	
1955–56	Hayes reserves	4–2	Bromley reserves	
1956–57	Leytonstone reserves	4–2	Hayes reserves	
1957–58	Bromley reserves	0–0	Kingstonian reserves	Original final.
1957–58	Bromley reserves	3–1	Kingstonian reserves	Replay.
1958–59	Eastley Athletic	5–0	Corinthian-Casuals reserves	
1959–60	Wealdstone reserves	1–0	Wimbledon reserves	
1960–61	Fisher Athletic	1–0	Tooting & Mitcham United reserves	
1961–62	Leytonstone reserves	2–1	Eastley Athletic	
1962–63	Hendon reserves	3–1	Wimbledon reserves	
1963–64	Dagenham reserves	4–0	Hendon reserves	
1964–65	Hendon reserves	7–3	Eastley Athletic	
1965–66	Tunnel Sports	5–1	Eton Manor reserves	
1966–67	Startford United	2–2	Tooting & Mitcham United reserves	Original final.
1966–67	Startford United	5–0	Tooting & Mitcham United reserves	Replay.
1967–68	Cheshunt reserves	2–2	Wealdstone reserves	Original final.
1967–68	Cheshunt reserves	1–0	Wealdstone reserves	Replay.
1968–69	Dagenham reserves	2–1	Hendon reserves	
1969–70	Kingstonian reserves	3–1	Muirhead Sports & Social	
1970–71	Cockfosters Athletic	1–1	Clapton reserves	Original final.
1970–71	Cockfosters Athletic	2–1	Clapton reserves	Replay.
1971–72	Boreham Wood reserves	1–0	Eastley Athletic	
1972–73	Hendon reserves	4–1	Fisher Athletic	
1973–74	Dulwich Hamlet reserves	3–0	Chadwell Heath & D.S.	
1974–75	Dulwich Hamlet reserves	3–2	Sutton United reserves	
1975–76	Hendon reserves	3–2	Fisher Athletic	
1976–77	Dagenham reserves	1–0	Wimbledon reserves	
1977–78	Beckton United	2–0	Pennant	
1978–79	Harrow Borough reserves	2–1	Croydon reserves	
1979–80	Hendon reserves	0–0	Walthamstow Avenue reserves	Original final.
1979–80	Hendon reserves	3–0	Walthamstow Avenue reserves	Replay.
1980–81	Dagenham reserves	3–0	Leytonstone & Ilford reserves	
1981–82	J&M Sports	4–3	Pennant	
1982–83	Brimsdown Rovers	1–0	Fountain	
1983–84	Newmont Travel	3–0	Walthamstow Avenue reserves	
1984–85	Newmont Travel	1–0	Barking reserves	
1985–86	Barking reserves	3–1	Bromley reserves	
1986–87	Fisher Athletic reserves	5–3	Woodford Town reserves	
1987–88	Newmont Travel	5–1	Fisher Athletic reserves	
1988–89	KPG Tipples	1–0	Tate & Lyle Sports (London)	
1989–90	Cockfosters	1–0	Port of London Authority	
1990–91	KPG Tipples	2–0	Port of London Authority	
1991–92	Walthamstow Trojan	3–1	Tower Hamlets (Tipples)	
1992–93	Craven	3–2	Bromley reserves	
1993–94	Clapton Villa	1–1	Walthamstow Trojan	Original final.
1993–94	Clapton Villa	2–1	Walthamstow Trojan	Replay.
1994–95	Bromley reserves	2–0	Woolwich Town	
1995–96	Canning Town	1–0	Bromley reserves	
1996–97	Metpol Chigwell	3–2	Leyton Pennant reserves	
1997–98	Little Heath Athletic	2–1	Ten-Em-Bee & Elms (Lewisham)	
1998–99	Canning Town	1–0	Cray Valley Paper Mills	
1999–2000	Metrogas	3–2	Old Roan	
2000–01	Corinthian-Casuals reserves	2–0	Metrogas	
2001–02	London City Athletic	4–1	Metrogas	
2002–03	Cray Valley Paper Mills	0–0	Thamesmead Town reserves	Won on penalties.
2003–04	Cray Valley Paper Mills	4–1	Thamesmead Town reserves	
2004–05	Metrogas	2–1	Cray Valley Paper Mills	
2005–06	Metrogas	2–1	Corinthian-Casuals reserves	
2006–07	Corinthian-Casuals reserves	2–2	Metrogas	Won on penalties.
2007–08	Metrogas	2–0	Cray Wanderers reserves	
