= Beckton United F.C. =

Beckton United
- Full name: Beckton United Football Club
- Founded: 1966, as Geevor
- Dissolved: 1996
- Ground: The Manorway, Beckton
- Final season; 1995–96: Spartan League, 10th of 13
Home colours

Beckton United Football Club was a football club based in Beckton, England. The club primarily played in the Spartan League.

== History ==
In 1966, Geevor was formed by Martin Evanson and George Raffelli. In 1975, the club changed its name to Beckton United. Whilst playing in the Spartan League, the club entered the FA Vase 11 times, reaching the third round in the 1985–86 season, before losing 3–0 at home to Stevenage Borough. In 1996, the club folded.

== Ground ==
In 1972, the club moved to The Manorway in Beckton, after playing at Wanstead Flats. During the 1978–79 London Spartan League season, Beckton United played at Woodford Town’s Snakes Lane ground.

== Records ==
- Best league position: 5th in the London Spartan League, 1981–82, 1982–83
- Best FA Vase performance: Third round, 1985–86
