= Brandon Chebby =

Burundian association football player

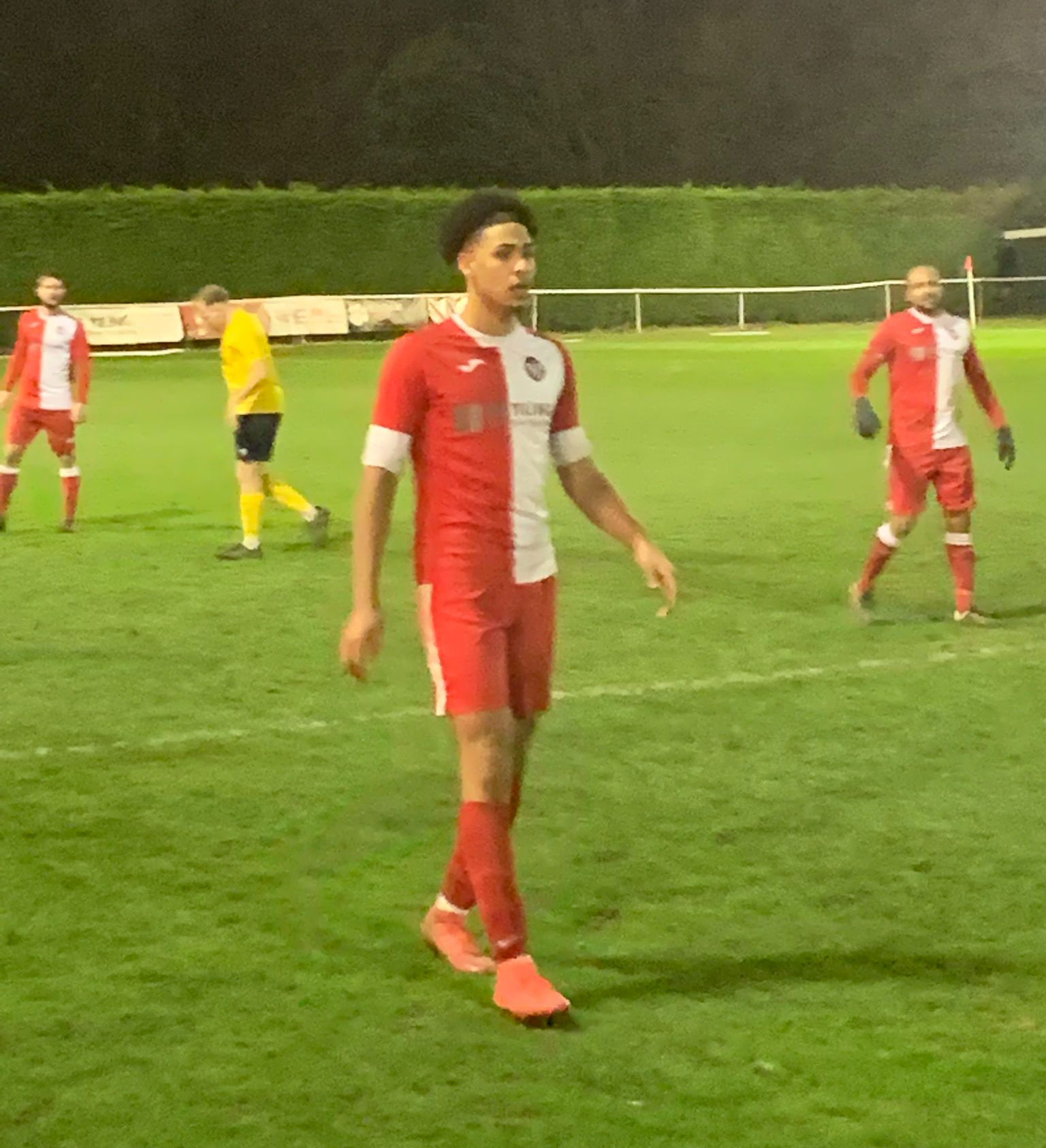

Personal information
- Full name: Brandon Taylor Anscombe Chebby
- Date of birth: 22 July 2000 (age 26)
- Place of birth: Southampton, England
- Position: Forward

Team information
- Current team: Bognor Regis Town

Youth career
- Eastleigh
- AFC Stoneham

Senior career*
Years	Team	Apps	(Gls)
2020	Aigle Noir Makamba		
2020	Hamble Club	7	(1)
2021	AFC Portchester	0	(0)
2021–2022	Folland Sports	3	(0)
2023	Fareham Town	2	(0)
2024	Totton & Eling	1	(0)
2024–2025	Millbrook	17	(5)
2025	Horndean	26	(11)
2025–	Bognor Regis Town	11	(3)

International career^{‡}
2020–	Burundi	3	(0)
- * Club domestic league appearances and goals as of 10:21, 21 January 2026 (UTC) ‡ National team caps and goals as of 09:25, 28 September 2020 (UTC)

Brandon Taylor Anscombe Chebby is a footballer who plays as a forward for Bognor Regis Town. Born in England, he plays for the Burundi national team.

== Club career ==
Chebby played for National League side Eastleigh at youth level. In December 2019, it was announced he would be joining Burundi Premier League side Aigle Noir Makamba. Ahead of the 2020–21 season, he had returned to England to play for Wessex League side Hamble Club, making his league debut as a substitute in a 2–1 loss to Tadley Calleva. In April 2021, he joined AFC Portchester to play for the club's under-23 side. In November 2021, he was playing for Wessex League Division One side Folland Sports. In March 2025, Chebby signed for Isthmian League South Central side Horndean. In November 2025, Chebby joined league rivals Bognor Regis Town.

== International career ==
Chebby three appearances for Burundi in the 2020 Bangabandhu Cup. In May 2021, he was called up to the Burundi U23 side for their 2021 CECAFA U-23 Challenge Cup campaign.
