= Rectory Meadow =

Nature reserve in Kent, England

Coordinates: 51.393°N 0.303°E

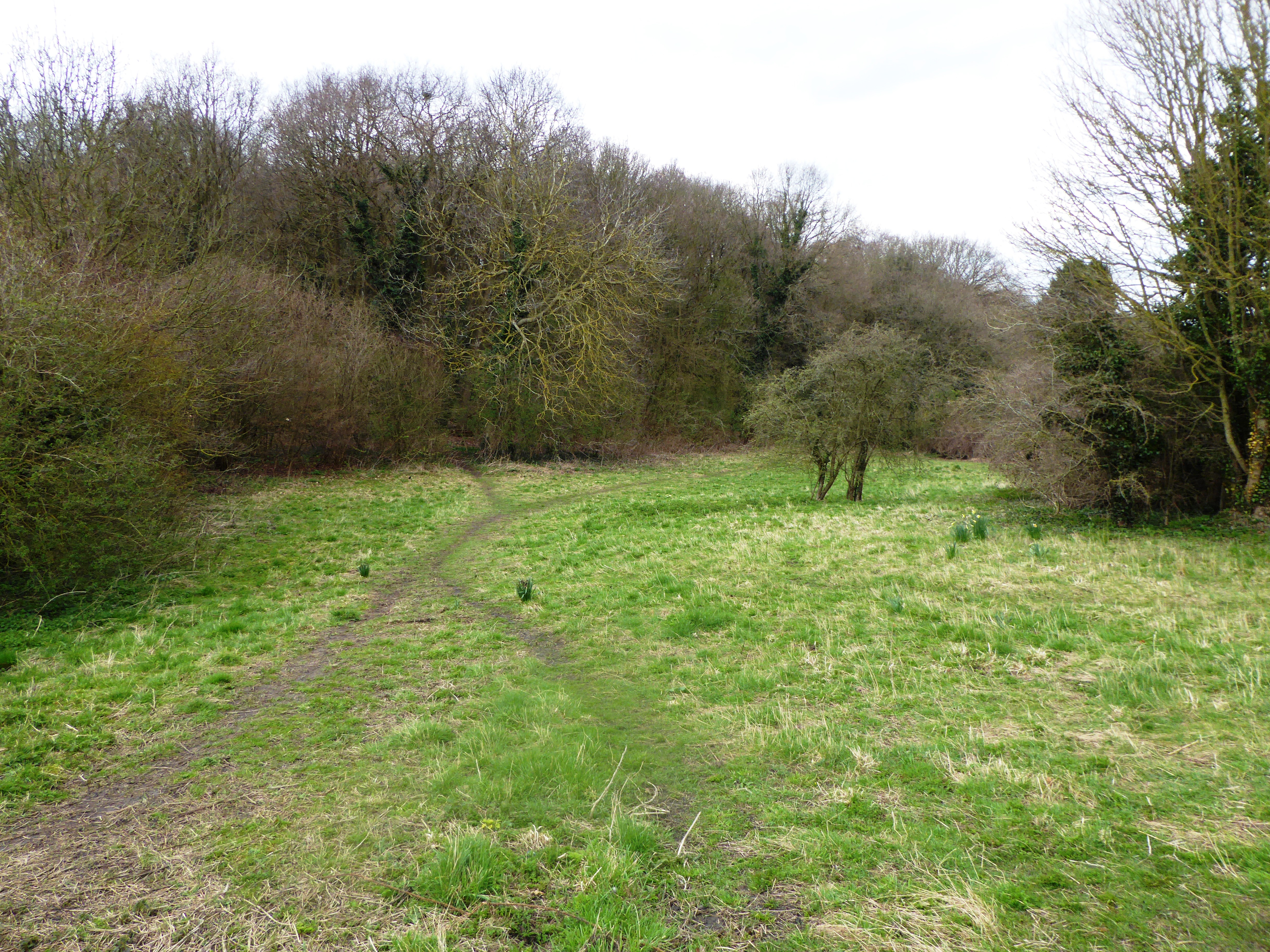
- Interactive map of Rectory Meadow
- Type: Local Nature Reserve
- Location: Hartley, Kent
- OS grid: TQ 603 685
- Area: 2.2 hectares (5.4 acres)
- Manager: Hartley Parish Council and North West Kent Countryside Project

Rectory Meadow is a 2.2-hectare (5.4-acre) Local Nature Reserve in Hartley in Kent. It is owned by Hartley Parish Council and managed by the council together with the North West Kent Countryside Project.

This site has chalk grassland and woodland. 193 species of flora have been recorded, including man orchids and cornflowers.

There is access from Hartley Road.
