= Westfield F.C. =

Westfield F.C. may refer to:

- Westfield F.C. (Surrey), an English association football club based in Woking
- Westfield F.C. (Sussex), an English association football club based near Hastings

== See also ==
- Westfields F.C., an English association football club based in Hereford
