= Harry McDonald =

English footballer (1926–2004)

Personal information
- Date of birth: 11 September 1926
- Place of birth: Salford, England
- Date of death: 2004 (aged 77–78)
- Position: Defender

Senior career*
Years	Team	Apps	(Gls)
1948–1950	Ashton United		
1950–1955	Crystal Palace	140	(1)
1955–?	Kettering Town		
- Gravesend and Northfleet
- * Club domestic league appearances and goals

Harry McDonald (11 September 1926 – 2004) was an English, retired professional footballer who played in the Football League for Crystal Palace as a defender. He also played non-league football for Ashton United, Kettering Town and Gravesend and Northfleet.

== Playing career ==
McDonald began his playing career with Ashton United, for whom he made 104 appearances, scoring once and did not enter the professional game until the relatively late age of 24. He was signed for Crystal Palace in September 1950, by then manager, Ronnie Rooke. and made his debut in a 5–0 away defeat to Bournemouth on 14 October. McDonald made only 12 appearances that season, but over the subsequent four Division Three South seasons, became a regular in the side making a total of 146 appearances, scoring one goal against Northampton Town in September 1954.

At the end of that season McDonald moved back into non-league football with Kettering Town and subsequently played for Gravesend and Northfleet. At Gravesend, McDonald made a total of 324 appearances and helped the club win the Southern League title.

McDonald died in 2004, aged 77 or 78.
