= Sunday league football in England =

Series of interconnected leagues

- Founded: 1925; 101 years ago (Edmonton & District, oldest)
- Country: England
- Level on pyramid: Outside the football league system
- Domestic cup: FA Sunday Cup

Sunday league football in England consists of a series of leagues of amateur football clubs that play matches on Sundays. Most Sunday leagues across England consist of multiple divisions including promotion and relegation, but are not part of the English football league system. Every Sunday League operates under the jurisdiction of the local county association. Since 1964, all the Sunday Leagues (adult, junior and youth) have been under the auspices of the Football Association and their clubs are eligible to compete in the FA Sunday Cup and the local county cups.

== History ==
=== Beginnings ===
The idea mainly started among young unemployed men in the 1920s in the Greater London area, with kick-abouts taking place in open spaces on Sunday afternoon. Soon, the first matches were organised but under difficult conditions for the players and the clubs: there were no changing rooms, no nets or corner flags and pitch markings. In the early 1930s a large percentage of workers were brought in London from Ireland, Manchester and Wales and these new immigrants formed their own Sunday football clubs.

The first Sunday League to be formed in England was the Edmonton & District Sunday Football League of North London in 1925. The East London Sunday League followed in 1930, the Metropolitan Sunday League in 1934, the West Fulham in 1936 and the Essex Corinthian in 1937.

Despite the fact that businessmen helped the clubs financially, the new leagues could not affiliate to the local County Football Association. Sunday league football was not recognised by any County FA, and footballers who were under contract by a Saturday side or referees had to play under assumed names or risk being suspended.

=== FA's hostile stance ===
Sunday leisure and entertainment activities had long been constrained by successive Sunday Observance Acts which also prohibited the charging for admission to such events. Additionally, in the religious areas of society it was considered unacceptable to partake in such activities on a Sunday, which was deemed a "day of rest". However, for those fans that worked on Saturdays and supported their local teams later in the day, Sundays were the only days to play football.

The Football Association went along with the traditional view and would refuse to officially recognise Sunday football, and thus place restrictions on it. However, many players and officials used false names when participating on a Sunday.

In August 1939, the FA finally decided to appoint a Sub-Committee to review the situation and potentially recognise Sunday league football, but World War II intervened.

=== Post war ===
With the parks being turned into anti-aircraft gun sites and with most young people becoming involved in the war effort and going into the services, very little football was played. On 24 September 1943, the Sub-Committee members were actually appointed and of these was Edward "Teddy" Eden, the F.A. Councillor for Birmingham, who was to spend the next 17 years persuading other F.A. Councillors to recognise Sunday football.

After the end of World War II, football activities were resumed, and Sunday league football attracted interest again with more London leagues being founded: the Southern Sunday League in 1944, Hackney and Leyton, and Hampstead & District (later renamed to Camden Sunday League) in 1947, Wandsworth and District in 1949 with most matches played at Hackney Marshes. In 1947 the Manchester Amateur Sunday League became the first one to start outside the area of Greater London, while the FA via its Sub-Committee had already made a few recommendations Sunday football restrictions since October 1945. When those recommendations were reviewed in July 1946 it was decided that no changes in the restrictions against Sunday football would be made.

Despite that, large crowds with an attendance of 300 to 400 were very common in the mid 1940s. Nearly every pub in London used to have and sponsor a football team, while other teams were funded by working men's clubs. Another reason for the creation of Sunday teams was the fact that many amateur football players had work commitments on Saturday and they could only play football on Sundays. Sunday football's popularity rose rapidly in the 1950s with many more leagues starting to form around England: the Watford Sunday League was founded in 1955, the South Birmingham Sunday League in 1957, the Wolverhampton & District in 1958 and the Middleton & District in 1959.

The Football Association saw this development as a threat to the legitimate Saturday football. But, by the late 1950s several Sunday leagues were getting unofficially recognised by the local County Associations. One of the first leagues was the Essex Sunday league which was unofficially recognised by the Essex County FA in 1955. Moreover, many young talents of the time would start of their careers playing Sunday league football and Jimmy Greaves and Bobby Moore were among them before joining amateur or professional youth sides.

In 1959 the FA announced that any players or referees participating in the Sunday leagues would be banned from the official Saturday football, after noticing that many professionals - including England's and Wolves' outside left, Jimmy Mullen were also playing Sunday league football.

Nevertheless, that announcement resulted in the creation of a national knock-out competition by the Sunday league Committees, the Sunday Cup between teams from the various Sunday leagues in 1960, and soon after the FA changed its policy and allowed Sunday leagues to become affiliated to County Associations.

=== The creation of the national Sunday Cup ===
The big step that the Committees of the various Sunday leagues across England took was the launch of a national cup competition in the 1960–61 season, similar to the FA Amateur Cup which had commenced in 1893. The inaugural final saw Walsall Waflers from the Lichfield & Walsall Sunday league facing the Stamford Rovers of the Grantham & District. Forest Gate Mount Athletic from the Essex Sunday Corinthian Sunday League won the next 3 finals until 1964 when The Football Association persuaded by Teddy Eden who had become the Chairman of the Committee decided to sanction the competition and rename it to FA Sunday Cup.

The format under the FA's jurisdiction would change in the 1964–65 season with a new trophy presented to the F.A. by Mohammad Reza Pahlavi, the King of Iran was allocated to this new revamped competition which was held on a County basis. Counties could enter either a representative XI league side or nominate one of their clubs to represent them. Only London used a nominated club, the Summerstown Athletic from Wimbledon. At the end 16 counties entered the new competition, with London (Summerstown Athletic) being crowned the winners against Hertfordshire (3-0).

=== The rise in the 1960s ===
After the FA allowed all Sunday leagues to be affiliated to the County Associations, there was a rapid increase in the creation of more leagues. Burton & District was founded in 1964, Gloucester & District and the Tameside Sunday League in 1965, Barnet & District, Coventry & District, Bletchley & District, Leamington & District, Nuneaton & District, Sutton & District in 1966, Cheltenham Sunday League and Hyde & District in 1968 etc. That unprecedented boom was also coupled up with England winning the FIFA World Cup in the summer of 1966. A few months earlier, on 26 January 1966, Teddy Eden, died, aged 86, just two days after presiding at what was to be his final Sunday Football committee meeting.

=== The 1980s ===
Amateur players continued to also feature in the Sunday league. On several occasions key players for amateur sides picked up injuries sustained whilst playing Sunday league football and many senior Saturday clubs not only followed suit against the Sunday League, but also encouraged their players to sign professional forms. Such a development would automatically exclude them from playing Sunday league football and it meant that several Sunday League clubs would lose their quality players. The majority of those amateur players eventually signed professional forms and that had a domino effect on some of the smaller Sunday sides of that time, all over the country.

=== The importance of Hackney Marshes ===
The Hackney Marshes pitch complex was formed in 1946 with some rubble from the Blitz used as part of the sub-surface. The Marshes located in Stratford, East London were divided into north, south, east and west, and at its peak in the 1950s and 60s there were 120 full-size pitches bringing over 2,500 local footballers down to the area every Sunday morning. The number of football pitches was down to 106 by 1990 and the hosting of the 2012 Summer Olympics by London meant that 12 pitches were converted to a car park. There are 88 left today, of which 60 are described as full-size adult pitches.

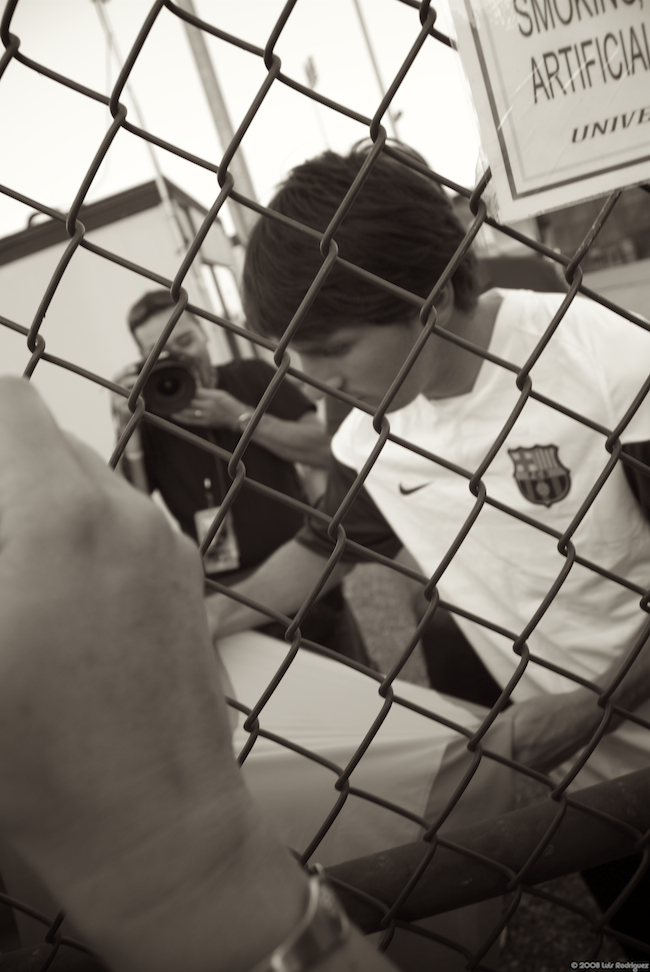
Messi's appearance in the Sunday league was cancelled

In 2010, Lionel Messi had expressed the desire to play at the Hackney Marshes and he flew into the spiritual home of English Sunday football via helicopter from London City Airport. Messi travelled to London on 15 September 2010 and was expected to come on as a substitute during a match of the Hackney and Leyton Sunday League, as part of a publicity stunt by Adidas. However, the exhibition event was cancelled due to security fears, after being surrounded by fans just moments after stepping out of the helicopter.

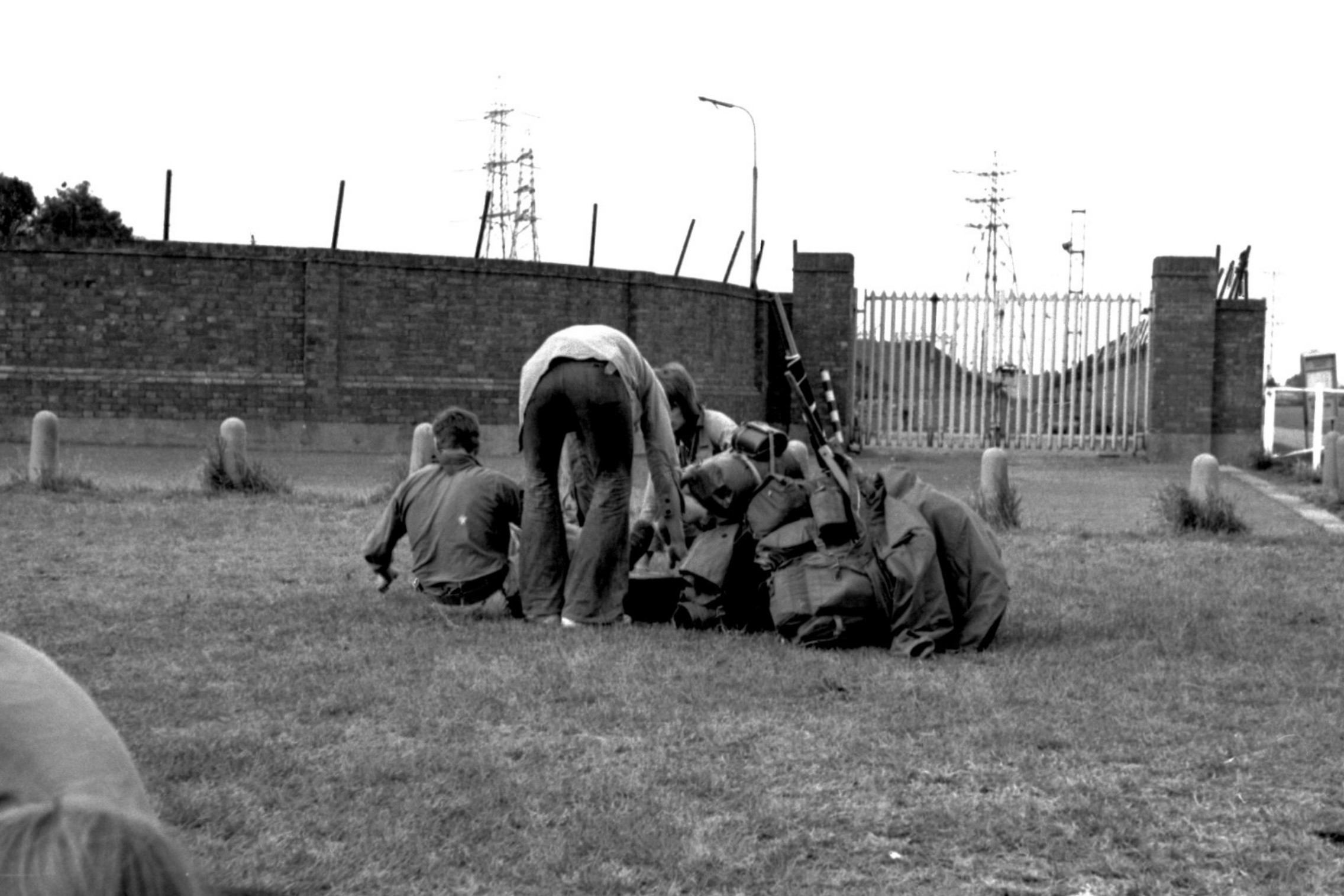
Hackney Marshes in 1973

=== 21st century: diversity of clubs and social media rise ===
In the 1950s there were various Sunday teams formed by Irish or Italian immigrants. With the turn of the century the scene has changed. Several new clubs reflect different ethnic backgrounds such as Ukrainian, Bulgarian, Romanian, Ghanaian, Arabic, Nigerian, Turkish, Caribbean, Brazilian and others. Most of these ethnic teams consist of football players who had previously competed in semi-professional or even professional leagues in their countries before migrating to England. A great example is F.C. Romania a Sunday club that switched to Saturday football and currently plays in the Isthmian League or ethnic-Ukrainian Niva FC of the Hackney and Leyton Sunday Football League.

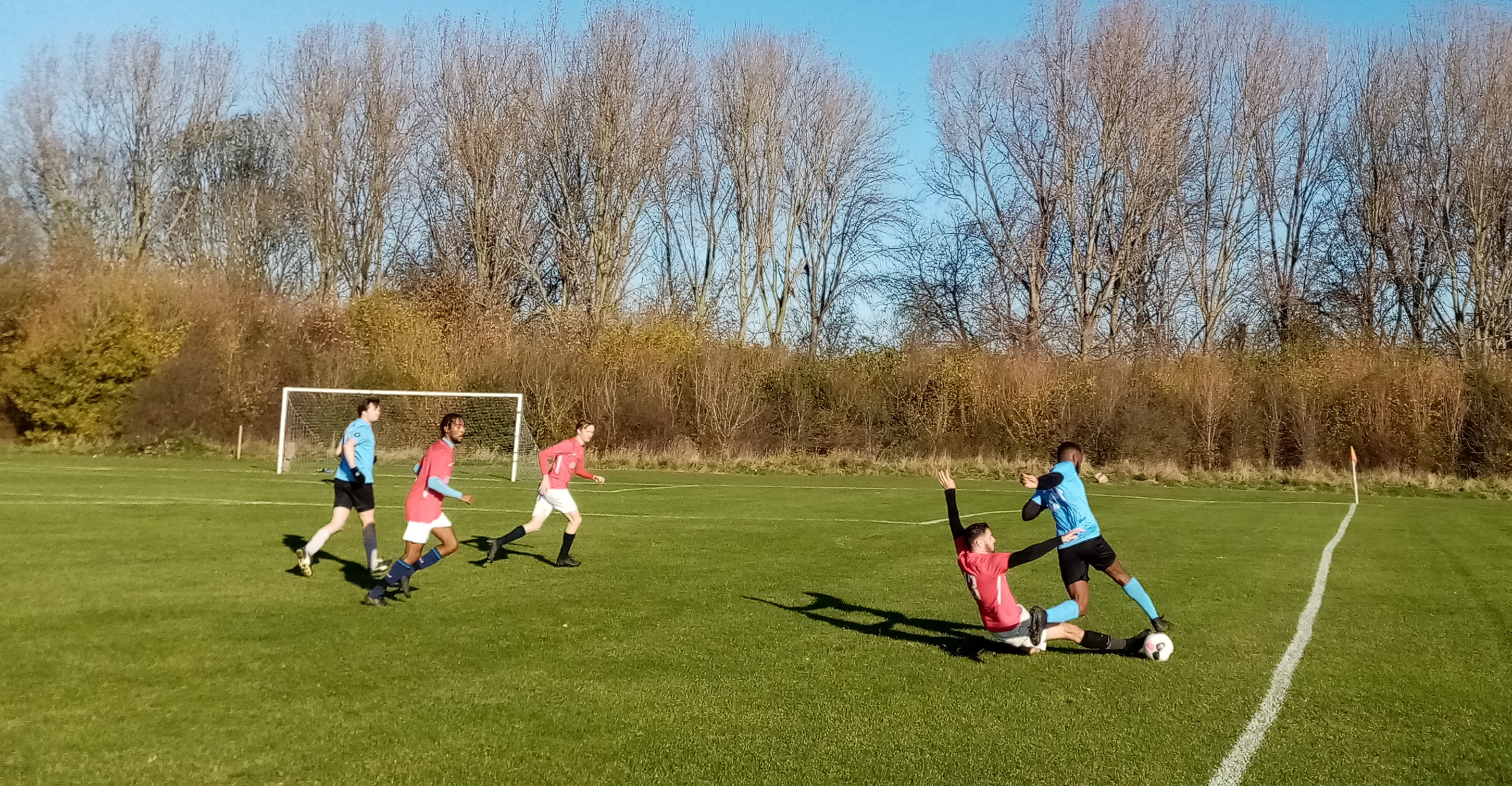
Sunday league match in England

Along with the bolstering of their squads has come the rise of the popularity of English Sunday league clubs who not only operate on higher standards with many of them recording their matches but also seem to have a decent following on social media and YouTube and some examples are Baiteze (40k subscribers), Rebel FC (110k subscribers), Hashtag United (476k subscribers), and SE Dons (241k subscribers) who also signed former Arsenal player, Zak Ansah and ex-Cyprus U-21 international Jack Sammoutis.

== Structure ==
Most of the Sunday leagues have named their first tier as the Premier Division while the Division One was previously considered the top level. Some leagues had even 10 divisions overall in the past (like the Wolverhampton & District in the 1950), while most of them they had up to 8. In the recent years 5 divisions is the most common number, though some Sunday leagues consist of just 2. All the divisions are bound together by the principle of promotion and relegation. A certain number of the most successful clubs in each division can rise to a higher division, whilst those that finish the season at the bottom of their league can find themselves sinking down a level.
The Sunday leagues are not officially part of the English football league system, but are recognised at various levels by county football associations. They are eligible to enter County Sunday cup competitions (league cups, cups, charity cups etc.) and the FA Sunday Cup. Sunday clubs may, if they feel they meet the appropriate standard of play and have suitable facilities, apply to join a Saturday league and join the National League.

== Finances and costs ==
Sunday league football has been financially supported to a certain extent by pubs and working men's clubs throughout its long history. But in recent years most clubs are either self-funded with their players contributing to the running costs or partially funded by various sponsors, though there are still quite a few pub clubs. The expenditure per season varies from £1,800 to £2,500, depending on the living standards of each area. The costs could include league affiliation (around £160), insurance and registration fees, pitch fees (up to £500 a year), kit and equipment costs (at least £350), also nets-corner flags-balls (around £200), referee fees (£250 and £500 per year payable by the home team) and fines. The increase of those costs resulted into the demise of many clubs which has drastically brought down the total number of Sunday teams registered in the local counties. A 2015 study commissioned by the FA revealed that 2,360 grassroots football teams had folded in a three-year period between 2012 and 2015.

== Sunday Leagues by County Association ==
London Football Association

- Camden Sunday League (1947) - 2 divisions (formerly 8 divisions)
- Central London Super Sunday League (2008)
- East London Sunday League (1930)
- Ford Sunday League
- Hackney and Leyton Sunday League (1947)
- Inner London League (2001)
- London and Kent Border Football League
- Metropolitan Sunday League (1934)
- North London Sunday League (1985)
- Southern Sunday League (1944)
- Sportsman's Senior Sunday League (1949)
- Wandsworth and District Sunday League (1949)
- West Fulham Sunday League (1936)
- Woolwich and Eltham Sunday Football Alliance (2006)

Bedfordshire County Football Association

- Bedford and District Sunday League
- North Home Counties Sunday League
- Leighton and District Sunday League
- South Beds Sunday League

Berks & Bucks Football Association

Other affiliated men's 11-a-side leagues are the Aylesbury & District League, the Bracknell Town & District Sunday League, the Chesham Sunday League, the Chiltern Church League, the Grant & Stone High Wycombe Sunday Combination, the Milton Keynes Sunday League, the Newbury & District Sunday League, the Reading & District Sunday League, the Upper Thames Valley League. Sunday Intermediate Cup and Junior cups

Birmingham County Football Association

- Beacon Sunday League (1977)
- Burton & District Sunday League (1964)
- Coventry & District Intermediate Sunday League (1966)
- Coventry & District Premier Sunday League (1966)
- Coventry & District Senior Sunday League (1962)
- Leamington & Dist Sunday League (1966)
- Nuneaton & District Sunday League (1966)
- Rugby & District Sunday League
- Solihull & District Oakbourne Sunday League
- South Birmingham Sunday League & Sunday Premier League (1957)
- Sutton & District Sunday Football League (1966)
- Tamworth & District Sunday League
- Warley Sunday League
- Wolverhampton & District Sunday League (1958) - 7 divisions (formerly 10 divisions)

Cambridgeshire County Football Association

- Cambridge & District League

Cornwall County Football Association

- Cornwall Sunday League
- West Cornwall Sunday League

Cumberland Football Association

- Carlisle City Sunday League

Derbyshire County Football Association

- Alfreton and District Sunday League
- Chesterfield and District Sunday League (1966)
- Derby City League - Sunday Morning
- Derby Sunday League (1973) (formerly Derby Taverners)
- Long Eaton Sunday League (1970)

Devon County Football Association

- Exeter and District Sunday League
- Torbay Sunday League
- North Devon Sunday League
- Plymouth and West Devon Sunday League
- Devon Wednesday League

Dorset County Football Association

- Blackmore Vale Football League
- Weymouth Sunday League

Durham County Football Association

- Consett and District Sunday League
- Durham and District Sunday League
- Darlington Sunday Morning Invitation League
- Hartlepool Sunday League
- Peterlee and District Sunday League
- Spennymoor Sunday League
- Stockton Sunday League
- Sunderland Sunday League
- Wear Valley Sunday League

East Riding County Football Association

- Hull Sunday League

Essex County Football Association

- Braintree & North Essex Sunday League
- Brentwood Sunday League
- Chelmsford Sunday League
- Colchester & District Sunday League
- Dagenham & District Sunday League
- Essex Sunday Corinthian League - 7 divisions
- Essex Sunday Football Combination
- Harlow & District Sunday League
- Romford & District Churches League
- Sceptre Sunday League
- South Essex Sunday League
- Southend Borough Combination Veterans League
- Southend and Basildon Sunday League
- Thurrock Association Sunday League

Gloucestershire County Football Association

- Bristol & District Sunday League (1966)
- Bristol & Wessex Sunday League (1980)
- Bristol Regional League (Sunday) (1963)
- Cheltenham Sunday League (1968) - 5 divisions
- Gloucester & District Sunday League (1965)

Hampshire Football Association

- Basingstoke & District Sunday League
- M.A. Hart Bournemouth Football League

Herefordshire County Football Association

- Herefordshire Sunday League

Hertfordshire County Football Association

- Barnet Sunday League (1966)
- Berkhamsted Sunday League
- East Herts Corinthian League (1993)
- Hitchin Sunday League (1977)
- North London and South Herts League (1985)
- Olympian Sunday League – Watford (1972)
- Review Sunday League
- North West Essex Sunday League
- Stevenage Sunday League
- Waltham (Sunday) League
- Watford Sunday League
- Welwyn Hatfield Sunday League

Huntingdonshire Football Association

- Huntingdonshire Sunday League

Kent County Football Association

- Ashford and District Sunday League
- Dover Sunday League
- Herne Bay and Whitstable Sunday League
- Maidstone and Mid Kent Sunday League
- Medway Messenger Sunday League
- North Kent Sunday League
- Orpington and Bromley District Sunday League
- Sheppey Sunday League
- Thanet Sunday League
- West Kent Sunday League

Lancashire County Football Association

- Blackburn Sunday League
- Blackpool and Fylde Sunday Alliance
- Burnley and District Sunday League
- Bury and District Sunday League
- Chorley Nissan Sunday League
- Harry Dewhurst Memorial Sunday League
- Middleton and District Sunday League
- Lancashire Evening Post Sunday League
- Ormskirk and District Sunday League
- Pendle Charity League
- Skelmersdale and District Sunday League
- South Lancashire Counties League

Leicestershire and Rutland County Football Association

- Alliance Football League
- Charnwood Sunday Football League
- Hinckley & District Football League
- Leicester Sunday Football League
- Melton & District Sunday Football League

Lincolnshire Football Association

- Boston and District Sunday League
- Grantham & District Sunday League
- Grimsby Cleethorpes and District Sunday League
- Grimsby Intermediate League (Sunday)
- Lincoln and District Sunday League
- Scunthorpe and District Sunday League
- Spalding and District Sunday League

Liverpool County Football Association

- Birkenhead Sunday League
- Crosby and District Sunday League
- Ellesmere Port Senior Sunday League
- Formers League – Sunday Competition
- Liverpool Business Houses League – Sunday Competition
- Ormskirk and District Sunday League
- Skelmersdale and District Sunday League
- Southport and District League – Sunday Competition
- Wallasey and District Sunday League
- Wirral Sunday League

London FA

- Camden Sunday League (1948)
- Central London Super Sunday League (2008)
- East London Sunday League (1930)
- Ford Sunday League
- Hackney and Leyton Sunday League (1947) - 5 divisions
- Inner London League (2001)
- London and Kent Border Football League
- London City Airport Sunday League
- Metropolitan Sunday League (1934)
- North London Sunday League (1985)
- Southern Sunday League (1944)
- Sportsman's Senior Sunday League (1949)
- Wandsworth and District Sunday League (1949)
- West Fulham Sunday League (1936)
- Woolwich and Eltham Sunday Football Alliance (2006)

Manchester Football Association

- Cheshire and Manchester Sunday League (1971)
- Eccles Sunday League (1969)
- Hyde & District Sunday League (1968)
- Manchester Accountants Sunday League
- Manchester Amateur Sunday League (1947)
- Middleton and District Sunday League (1959)
- Oldham Sunday Football League (1970)
- Stockport and Cheadle Sunday League
- Tameside Sunday League (1965)

Middlesex County Football Association

- Middlesex County Sunday League

Norfolk County Football Association

- Great Yarmouth Sunday League
- King's Lynn and District Sunday League
- Norwich and District Sunday League

North Riding County Football Association

- Langbaurgh Sunday League - 3 Divisions
- MB Distribution Redcar Sunday League - 2 Divisions
- Ian's Cars of Barlby York Sunday Morning League - 4 Divisions
- Scarborough and District Sunday League - 3 Divisions
- Teesborough Football League - 2 Divisions
- Black Sheep Brewery Hambleton Football Combination - 3 Divisions

Northamptonshire Football Association

- Daventry & District Sunday League
- Kettering Area Sunday League
- Northants Sunday Combination
- Northants Sunday Conference
- Peterborough & District Sunday League
- Peterborough Sunday Morning League
- Rushden & District Sunday League

Northumberland Football Association

- Blyth and Wansbeck Sunday League
- Cramlington and District Sunday League
- Hexham and District Sunday League
- Morpeth Sunday League
- Newcastle Central Sunday Afternoon League
- North East Sunday League

Nottinghamshire County Football Association

- Nottinghamshire Sunday League

Oxfordshire County Football Association

- Upper Thames Valley Sunday Football League (1980–Present)
- Trailblazers Sunday Football League (2024-Present)

Sheffield & Hallamshire County Football Association

- Sheffield Sunday League

Shropshire Football Association

- Greenhous Shrewbury and District Sunday League

Somerset County Football Association

- Bath and District Football League
- Blackmore Vale Football League (1914) – Sunday
- Bridgwater & District Sunday Football League (1966)
- Frome & District Sunday Football League (1968)
- Taunton & District Sunday Football League
- Weston-Super-Mare Sunday Football League
- Yeovil Sunday Football League (1975)

South Derbyshire Football Association

- Burton and District Sunday Football League

Staffordshire Football Association

- Stafford and District Sunday Football League

Suffolk County Football Association

- Bury and District Sunday Football League
- Ipswich and District Licensed Trades League
- Ipswich Sunday League
- Lowestoft Sunday League
- Sudbury and District Sunday League

Surrey County Football Association

- Surrey Sunday League

Sussex County Football Association

- SSFL Sussex Sunday League

West Riding County Football Association

- Bradford Sunday Alliance League
- Bridge Balti Halifax Sunday Football League
- Castleford & District Sunday League
- Claro Sunday League
- Goole & District Sunday League
- Heavy Woollen Sunday League
- Kirklees Sunday League
- Leeds Combination League
- Leeds Sunday Alliance Football League
- Leeds Sunday Leagues
- Wakefield & District Sunday League
- Wharfedale Triangle League

Wiltshire Football Association

- Wiltshire Sunday League

Worcestershire County Football Association

- Worcestershire Sunday League

== Sunday League records ==
- In March 2012, Wheel Power F.C. won 58–0 against Nova 2010 F.C. in the Torbay Sunday League to record what was believed to be the largest victory ever achieved in British football.
- On 4 May 2013, Alex Torr scored a hat-trick in world record-breaking 70 seconds in the Rawson Springs - Winn Gardens (7-1), in the Meadowhall Sunday League of Sheffield. Match referee Matt Tyers has confirmed the timings of the goals and admitted he had never seen anything like it before. Torr just three days earlier had notched another treble in just three in a 7–0 win over Penistone Church.
- Simeon Cobourne scored at least 60 goals per season for four consecutive years with Digby Rangers in Birmingham's Coronation League (2015-2019).
- Stan Gittings managed Hackney and Leyton Sunday Football League club, Midfield, for more than 40 years since its conception in 1967.
- Kieren Watson holds the record for most goals scored in a single season when he scored 107 for Kirkby Town in the Nottinghamshire Senior Division 1 in the 2012/2013 season.

== Notable clubs ==
- Forest Gate Mount Athletic - won 3 Sunday Cups (1962, 1963, 1964)
- New Salamis - played in 2 Sunday Cup Finals (2015, 2016) and afterwards switched to Saturday football, playing currently in the Spartan South Midlands League
- Senrab F.C. - produced more than 170 professional players and still compete in the Essex Corinthian League
- Albion Sports - won 5 championships in the Bradford Sunday League (2000, 2001, 2003, 2005, 2006), played in 2 Sunday Cup Finals (2000, 2005) and afterwards switched to Saturday football, playing currently in the Northern Counties East League
- F.C. Romania - switched to Saturday football, playing currently in the Isthmian League
- Walthamstow Avenue F.C. - the oldest club (founded in 1900), won the FA Amateur Cup and the Isthmian Football League 3 times each, before joining the English Sunday League
- Stannington Village - won 6 championships in the Sheffield Sunday League (2004, 2013, 2014, 2015, 2017, 2018)
- Sheffield Trades & Labour - won 4 championships in the Sheffield Sunday League (1989, 1990, 1991, 1992)
- Woodhouse George/West End - won 7 championships in the Sheffield Sunday League (1995, 2005, 2006, 2007, 2008, 2009, 2010)
- Billet Villa - played in 9 Cup Finals in a row between 1969 and 1977, losing only to Partridge in the 1972, in the Orpington and Bromley District Sunday Football League
- Southboroug - won 7 league consecutive titles between the 1950s and 1960s in the Orpington and Bromley District Sunday Football League
- Hetton Lions Cricket Club - won a record 4 Sunday Cups (2006, 2008, 2010, 2012)
- Carlton United - played in 3 Sunday Cup Finals (1967, 1973,1979), currently playing in the Lowestoft Sunday League
- M.G. Sports - won 5 titles in a row in the Hackney and Leyton Sunday Football League between 1985 and 1989.
- Penn Old boys - one of the longest operating Sunday club, founded in 1958 by 16 year-olds and played in the Wolverhampton & District Sunday League for 40 years until 1998.
- Imperial - won a record 7 championships in the Barnet Sunday League
- Marshtons Sports FC - won a record 5 championships in the Wolverhampton & District (1990, 1991, 1994, 1995, 1996) and played in 3 Sunday Cup Finals (1990, 1992, 1997)
- Riverside - won 13 championships in the Watford Sunday League (1956, 1957, 1960, 1961, 1962, 1963, 1964, 1966, 1967, 1968, 1970, 1972, 1973)
- Oakview - won a record 14 championships in the Watford Sunday League (1996, 1997, 1998, 1999, 2003, 2006, 2008, 2009, 2011, 2012, 2014, 2015, 2016, 2017)
- Evergreen - won 9 championships in the Watford Sunday League (1974, 1975, 1976, 1977, 1978, 1979, 1981, 1992, 1993) and played in the 1976 Sunday Cup Final
- Luton St.Josephs - won 10 championships in the Watford Sunday League (1982, 1983, 1986, 1989, 2000, 2001, 2004, 2005, 2007, 2010) and played in 6 Sunday Cup Finals (1995, 1996, 1998, 1999, 2006, 2020)
- Monica Star FC - the only Sunday team that has fielded 4 ex-Premier League players in their squad: Lee Hendrie, Paul Devlin, Darren Byfield and Lee Carsley. The club was founded in 1977.
- Lapton - won four promotions and also titles in a row between 2003 and 2006 in the Hackney and Leyton Sunday Football League
- SE Dons - arguably the most popular Sunday club worldwide with more than 175,000 social media subscribers and international jersey sales. They play in the Orpington and Bromley District Sunday League
- Caversham United FC - founded in 2015, “The Goats” play in the Reading & District Sunday League. Their progressive social media and charity work has led to their popularity spreading, with shirts now sent to over 25 countries.
- Ten em Bee - founded in 1975, currently plays in the Bromley and South London Football League (formerly in the London and Kent Border League) and has produced players like Dickson Etuhu, Joe Gomez, Ian Wright and his son Shaun Wright-Phillips
- Birstall Stamford Fc - the most successful team in Sunday league history winning 91 trophy's domestically with also getting to 4 semi finals and a final (2019) in the Sunday FA cup. They play in the Leicestershire and Charnwood Sunday league.

== Notable players ==
Many players with professional experience before or after joining the league have played for various Sunday League clubs. Some of them were also ex-internationals.

=== Junior and minor ===
- (England) Lee Bowyer - Echo Junior Football League
- (England) David Beckham - Hackney and Leyton Sunday League
- (England) Sol Campbell - Hackney and Leyton Sunday League
- (England) Jermain Defoe - Echo Junior Football League
- (England) Ugo Ehiogu - Echo Junior Football League
- (England) Ray Wilkins - Echo Junior Football League
- (England) Rio Ferdinand - Hackney and Leyton Sunday League
- (England) Ian Wright - Hackney and Leyton Sunday League
- (England) Bedford Jezzard - Hackney and Leyton Sunday League
- (England) Jimmy Greaves - Hackney and Leyton Sunday League
- (England) Bobby Moore - Hackney and Leyton Sunday League
- (England) Ledley King - Echo Junior Football League
- (England) Paul Konchesky - Echo Junior Football League
- (England) Stuart Pearce - Hackney and Leyton Sunday League
- (England) John Terry - Echo Junior Football League and Hackney and Leyton Sunday League
- (England) Shaun Wright-Phillips - London and Kent Border Sunday League
- (England) Bobby Zamora - Echo Junior Football League
- (Ghana) Cliff Akurang - Echo Junior Football League
- (Nigeria) Ade Akinbiyi - Echo Junior Football League
- (Trinidad and Tobago) Jlloyd Samuel - Echo Junior Football League
- (Jamaica) Simon Ford - Echo Junior Football League
- (Turkey) Muzzy Izzet - Echo Junior Football League
- (Nigeria) Dickson Etuhu - Bromley and District Football League
- (England) Joe Gomez - Bromley and District Football League

=== Youth ===
- (England) Stuart Pearce - Fulham and District Sunday League (1978–81)
- (England) Alex Torr - Meadowhall Sunday League
- (England) Ian Wright - London and Kent Border Sunday League (until 1984)

=== During professional career ===
- (England) Jimmy Mullen - Wolverhampton & District Sunday League
- (England) Zak Ansah - Orpington and Bromley Sunday League (2019–present)
- (Cyprus) (England) Jack Sammoutis - Orpington and Bromley Sunday League (2018–present)

=== Post-career ===
- (England) Darren Byfield - Central Warwickshire (2017–present)
- (England) Paul Gascoigne - Bournemouth Sunday League (2014–15)
- (England) Tony Hibbert - Skelmersdale Sunday league (2016–18)
- (England) Nile Ranger - Barnet Sunday League (2020–21)
- (England) Liam Ridgewell - Sutton and District Sunday League (2020–present)
- (Wales) Robbie Savage - Wrexham Sunday League (2013–14)
- (England) Chris Waddle - Lincoln and District Sunday League (2019–present)
- (Republic of Ireland) Lee Carsley - Central Warwickshire (2017–present)
- (England) Lee Hendrie - Central Warwickshire (2017–present)
- (Scotland) Paul Devlin - Central Warwickshire (2017–18)
- (Argentina) Julio Arca - Sunderland Sunday League (2014–15)
- (Northern Ireland) Maik Taylor - Central Warwickshire (2014–15)
- (Bulgaria) Martin Petrov - Manchester Saturday League (2013) & Central Warwickshire (2014–15)
- (Bulgaria) Stiliyan Petrov - Central Warwickshire (2014–15)
- (Greece) Ntinos Pontikas - Hackney and Leyton Sunday League (2021–22)
- (Jamaica) Ricardo Fuller - Potteries and District Sunday League (2018–19)

== Notable managers ==
- (England) David Busst - Central Warwickshire
- (England) Lee Bowyer - Essex Corinthian Sunday League
- (England) Ray Lewington - Essex Corinthian Sunday League
- (England) Kevin Nolan Sr. - Liverpool and District Sunday League
- (England) Chris Wilder - Imperial and Meadowhall Sunday League
- (England) Ray Wilkins - Essex Corinthian Sunday League
- (Italy) Dario Gradi - Essex Corinthian Sunday League

== See also ==
- FA Sunday Cup
