= Sunday league football =

Amateur association football competitions

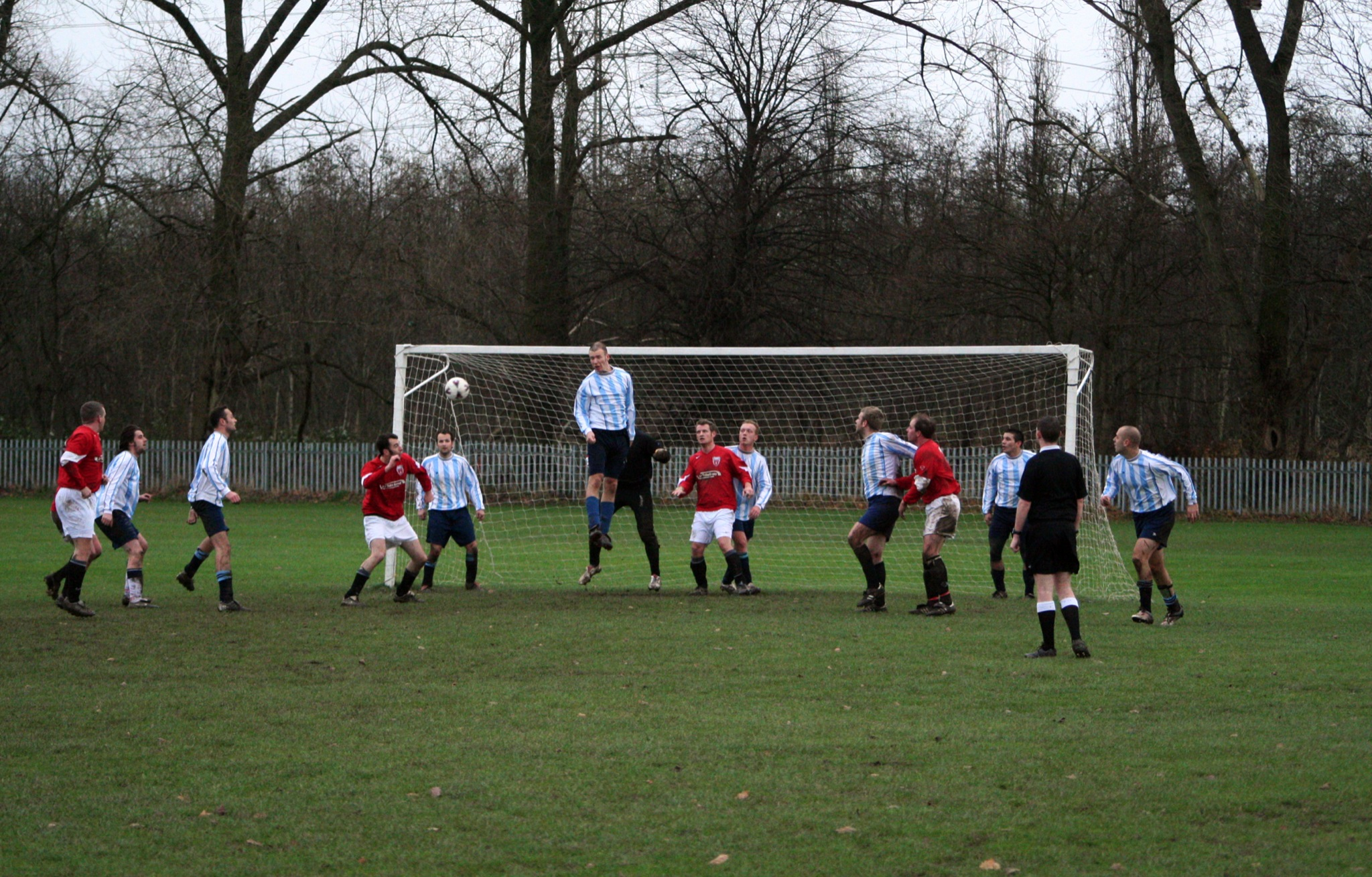
A Sunday league match in Manchester in 2007. Such matches often take place in public parks without spectator accommodation.

Sunday league football is a term used in Britain, Ireland and Australia to describe amateur association football competitions which usually take place on Sunday rather than the more usual Saturday. The term pub league may also be used, owing to the number of public houses that enter teams. Sunday league football is stereotypically seen as being of far lower quality than Saturday football and involving players who are often unfit or hungover. As a result, the term "Sunday league" is colloquially used to describe a performance at any level of football which is seen as inept or amateurish. Despite this perception some leagues include players who also play at a high level of semi-professional football on Saturdays.

Sunday leagues are sanctioned by the local County Football Association. Sunday leagues do not form part of the hierarchical English football league system, but Sunday teams can opt to switch to Saturday play and potentially rise up the levels of the league system. The FA Sunday Cup is a national knock-out competition for English Sunday league football teams administered by the FA, which has been staged since 1964.

The most prominent single location for Sunday league football is Hackney Marshes in east London, which has been called the "spiritual home" of Sunday league. The oldest Sunday League in England is the Edmonton & District Sunday Football League, based in North London, which was formed in 1925.

== History and Organisation ==
Sunday Leagues operate independent of the formal English Football League hierarchy and are approved by the various County Football Associations.

Although Sunday teams cannot enter directly into the Professional Football Pyramid, a team could transition from a Sunday League to a Saturday League to progress through the National System. The Football Association (FA) created the FA Sunday Cup in 1964 as a competitive structure for Sunday teams at the National Level. The FA Sunday Cup is a National Knockout Tournament that serves as the highest level of competition in Sunday League football in England, allowing the top amateur teams throughout the Country to compete for a prestigious Trophy.

== Cultural and Social Impact ==
The Sunday League Football Association was founded in 1974. The Sunday League is a national organization that oversees all amateur football leagues in England and Wales. It also provides training to coaches and referees. The Sunday League has over 2 million registered players and more than 300,000 volunteers across the two countries. The Sunday League is the largest amateur football organization in Europe.

== Modern Challenges ==
The number of people playing Sunday league football is under threat. Referees are getting older and fewer young people want to become one. The main reasons for this are the abuse they receive from both the players and fans and the lack of support they get financially. A recent report showed that many games are being called off at the last minute because there isn't a referee available to take charge [2]. Austerity measures and cuts to local authority spending are also affecting the standards of facilities used for Sunday league football. Many of these pitches suffer from bad drainage and lack of upkeep.

== Women's Sunday League ==
Women's football, which has always been a male-dominated sport at the local level, is now the most quickly expanding area of grassroots football in the United Kingdom. Professional women's football has gained significant traction with the general public.

As a result, many new women-only football leagues are being formed to accommodate growing interest. The Greater London Women's Football League is one example of an organization that offers competitive Sunday football to amateur women's teams throughout the London area.

In addition to traditional 11-a-side formats, other forms of weekend leagues (e.g., 5-a-side and 7-a-side) have greatly increased participation among female amateur players.

== Notable locations and records ==
The largest number of pitches at one time (over 70) for Sunday League football are located on Hackney Marshes in East London. As such, many consider Hackney Marshes to be the "spiritual home" of both Sunday League and Grassroots football.

The longest running Sunday League in England has been the Edmonton & District Sunday Football League in North London; it began in 1925. The most notable record from a game is Wheel Power F.C.'s 58-0 win against Nova 2010 F.C., in the Torbay Sunday League, in March 2012. Many believe this is the largest margin of victory in British football history.

== Former Professional Players ==
There are also some former professional players who play for local Sunday league teams. They often play for a team with friends or family. For example, former Manchester United and England midfielder Paul Scholes played for Chadderton Park Legends in the Oldham Sunday League in 2014, in order to play with his son. Former Premier League player Robbie Savage also plays in quiet amateur Sunday games after retiring from professional football.

== Culture And Common Jokes ==
Sunday league football has its own unique culture. Often there is more focus on socializing than on serious fitness. Many teams are linked to local pubs, who provide the players with kits and meet up before matches. After the match the players usually return to the pub to celebrate their victory or commiserate their loss. A common joke about Sunday league football is that players arrive for matches still suffering from the effects of alcohol from the previous night. Another well-known tradition is the ‘magic sponge’ – a bucket of water and a sponge used by the manager or trainer to treat almost any minor injury that occurs on the pitch.

== YouTube And Social Media ==
More recently, with the growth of YouTube and social media, a number of Sunday league football matches have been filmed and posted online by content creators. These videos have often contained great skills, funny mistakes and intense local rivalries, and have attracted millions of views worldwide. This has led to the growth of a number of online-based football teams, such as Hashtag United and SE Dons, who post videos of their matches online, and have even progressed to playing in official English football leagues.

== A Path To Professional Football ==
Although most Sunday league players are playing for fun, there are many examples of players who have started their professional careers in Sunday league football. Before the introduction of youth academies, many scouts would attend Sunday morning football matches in order to find players for semi-professional teams and then possibly the Football League. Former Arsenal and England striker Ian Wright played Sunday league football before signing for Crystal Palace as a 21-year-old in 1985. Jamie Vardy, who won the Premier League with Leicester City, also started in amateur football.

== Television coverage ==
In 1991, Danny Baker hosted The Game, a TV series focusing on East London Sunday League matches at Hackney Marshes, on Friday nights on LWT. The title of the show was a spoof of The Match, formerly The Big Match, the banner under which major league matches were televised on ITV at the time. The series ran for six episodes, culminating in the final of the Dick Coppock Cup (for Division Four of the league).

== See also ==
- Sunday league football in England
