= Hackney and Leyton Sunday Football League =

Association football league in London, England

- Founded: 1946
- Country: England
- Divisions: Premier Division; Division One; Division Two; Division Three
- Number of clubs: 52
- Domestic cup(s): FA Sunday Cup; London FA County Cups; Dickie Davies Cup; Jack Morgan Cup; Albert Daniels Senior Cup; Sunday Intermediate Cup
- Current champions: Baddoo FC (Premier); Boundary Estate (Division One); The Gun (Division Two); Karpaty(Division Three); The Gun II (Division Four) (2022-23)
- Website: Hackney & Leyton Football League at FA; League website

The Hackney and Leyton Sunday Football League is a football competition based in London, England. It was founded in 1946 and operates under the jurisdiction of the London Football Association, the only English regional association founded by the FA.

The Hackney and Leyton Sunday League is considered a historic league as it has produced many players of the English football, such as England captains Bobby Moore and David Beckham, Jimmy Greaves, Ian Wright, Sol Campbell, Stuart Pearce, Vinnie Jones, Rio Ferdinand and others. Most of the games are played at the Hackney Marshes football complex, the biggest in the world. In 2010 FC Barcelona’s star Lionel Messi arrived at the Marshes to come on as a substitute in a league match as a publicity stunt for Adidas, however, it was quickly cancelled as he was mobbed by fans.

The league has currently five divisions, the Premier Division, Division One, Division Two, Division Three and Division Four. It had a long association with Leyton FC with its headquarters located at the Leyton Stadium (previously known as the Hare and Hounds) until the headquarters moved to the Hackney Volunteers Club in Clapton. The league's longest-running club was Midfield, founded in 1967 and managed by Stan Gittings for over 40 years.

== History ==
=== Early years ===
The league has run since 1946 at the iconic Hackney Marshes in East London and is considered the most widely recognised grassroots football league in the United Kingdom. In the beginning it covered teams from mainly North London, the Hackney and Leyton areas, East London and even North Kent.

Ever since, the league has seen players reach the professional ranks, as many heroes of English football, Bobby Moore to David Beckham started their careers from the league. In 1952, the league's first cup tournament was launched, the Senior Cup and more followed in the 1970s and 1980s, like the iconic Dickie Davies Cup. The majority of the Cup finals were played at the Brisbane Road, home of Leyton Orient.

Up until the 1970s, a lot of semi-professional players used to play in the league on Sundays, and it used to getting good crowds of 500 people for the big games. Those attendances were sometimes higher than for Leyton Town. Those players played on Saturdays for the great amateur clubs of the time in the area, such as Walthamstow Avenue, Corinthian Casuals, Enfield F.C., Leytonstone F.C., Barnet F.C. and Finchley F.C.. It was also a common belief that these players were getting paid by their Sunday club, the so called boot money. According to Johnnie Walker, the league's former chairman who first played on the Marshes in 1952, aged just 17, people also used to bet on the games as there were bookmakers by the side of the pitch.

The clubs that could afford these top footballers were the cream of the Hackney & Leyton league. In the early years, that team was United Services, then after 1962, Barrowside FC who won the Premier division 3 times in a row, also Eastern FC, and Salisbury. Gus Sports won 3 Senior Cups (1965-67) and the Premier Division in 1971.

These teams always drew large crowds when they played, especially once the derbies were held at the Hare & Hounds Ground, of Leyton F.C.. Then, it was not unusual when a crowd of 200-300 spectators would fill the home of Leyton F.C..

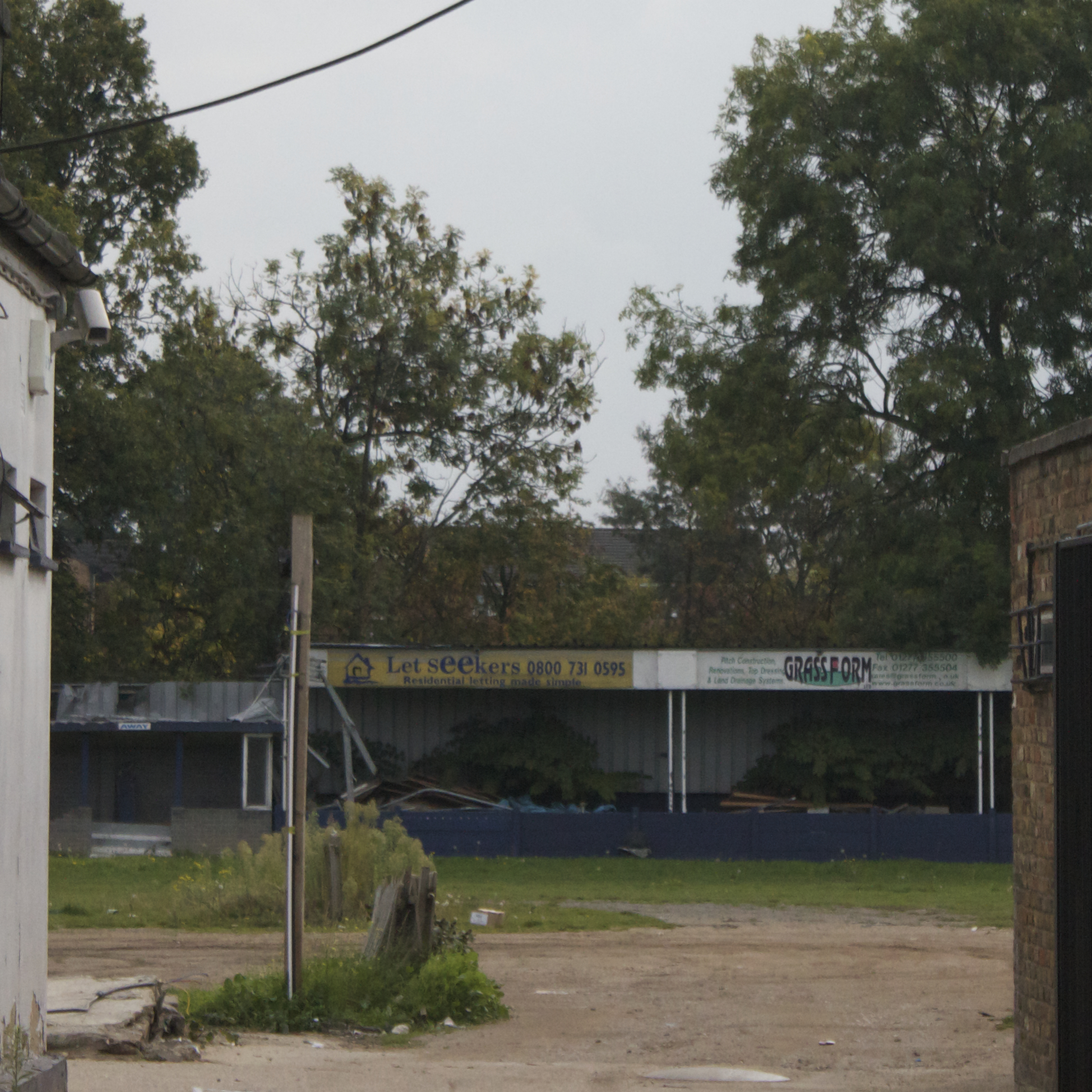
The remains of the main entrance to Leyton's stadium

In the 1970s, the Railway Rovers won the Premier Division 3 times and Islington Stanley twice,

=== Recent years ===
In the 1980s as football became more professionalised and organised globally, the league lost that great influx of the semi pro footballers during its games and the average attendance dropped. In that decade Joiners FC won the Premier Division and the Senior Cup twice, and the newly launched Dickie Davies Cup, 3 years in a row.

MG Sports dominated the Premiership winning it five times and the Dickie Davies Cup twice, while Monteith, their great rivals, won the Senior Cup 3 times in a row. Their 1980s domination was terminated by Ordell FC who won the Premier Division 3 times.

In the 1990s, Bancroft and Eureka won the ppremier league title along with cup trophies. In 1995, the Hackney Gazette newspaper organised and renamed the Junior Cup after the publication, with the local press interest in the league increasing. The 2000s saw the emergence of two clubs who dominated the league's trophies: Hoxton Athletic and Lapton (est. 2002). And by the end of the decade the online interest about the league's results and photo coverage increased with the local press from Hackney and Islington covering important cup or league games for their publications.

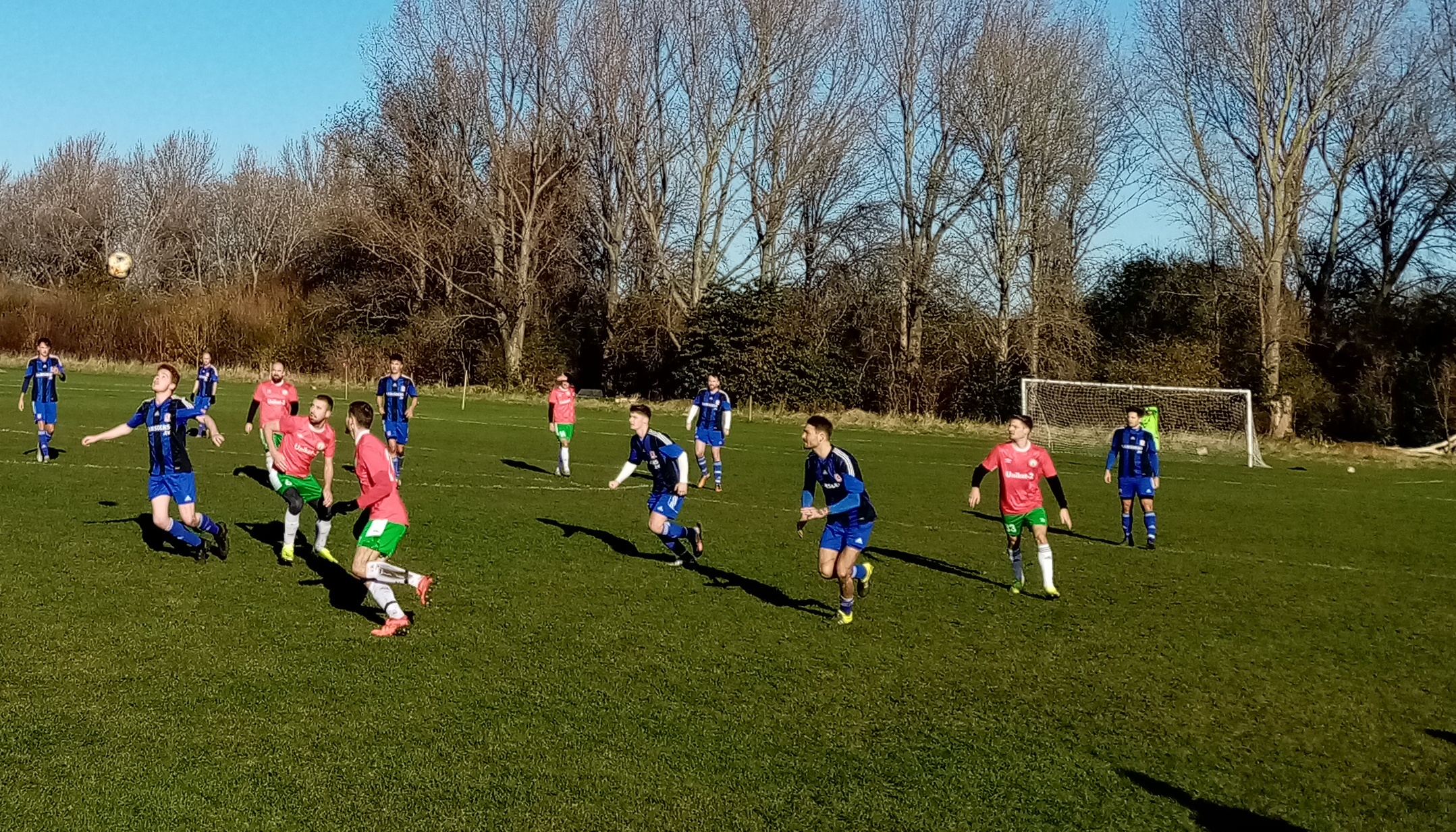
League match at Hackney Marshes in 2021

In more recent years, after the European Union expanded and immigration increased, many ethnic teams have been formed, like Romanian, Bulgarian, Ukrainian or Ghanaian teams with Baddoo FC, Real Romania or Nyva having won silverware with foreign former professional or semi pro players in their squads. Other teams moved to Saturday County football, while the majority of them have engaged the new digital era with heavy social media presence and focus in organisation, digital marketing and sponsorship deals.

The league in the 1990s was also the setting at Hackney Marshes for the Park Life Nike commercial featuring Eric Cantona, Ian Wright (a former Sunday league player), and Robbie Fowler and also for the Adidas campaign featuring Lionel Messi in the 2010s.

== Principals ==
Taylor-Innes was one of the league's founders in 1946 and was chairmen for many years alongside Dave Taylor who was later honoured by having the league's domestic cup in his name (the cup started in 1952 and renamed to Dave Taylor Cup in 1972, and since 1999 it's been known as the Albert Daniels Senior Cup). Other chairmen were Peter Clarke, Ronnie Burce, and Alec Pretlove until 2003 and is considered the league's most popular chairman. Frank Hendy was one of the longest-serving Referee Secretaries; such was Albert Whitehead, while Ted Gore holds the position currently. Dickie Davies was the Registration Secretary for years, with his wife Nell at the post now. His memory has been honored with the establishment of the Dickie Davies Cup in 1980, the league's most prestigious domestic cup

Since 2003, Dino Constantinou has been the technical and website guru of the league, collecting all the info and historical statistics online for the fans. Until 2018,the league's official website used to attract around 200,000 visitors per season.

== League champions ==
=== Premier division ===
Founded in 1956. Until then the top tier was the Division One (1951-1956).

- **1951–52** – Stoke United FC
- **1952–53** – Stoke United FC (2)
- **1953–54** – Pembury
- **1954–55** – Pembury (2)
- **1955–56** – Lordship

..................................

- **1956–57** – United Services
- **1957–58** – ‘’no record’’
- **1958–59** – United Services
- **1959–60** – Lea United
- **1960–61** – Lordship
- **1961–62** – United Services (2)
- **1962–63** – Barrowside
- **1963–64** – Barrowside
- **1964–65** – Barrowside (3)
- **1965–66** – Lordship (3)
- 1966–67 – Salisbury
- 1967–68 – Eastern
- 1968–69 – Victoria Villa
- 1969–70 – Victoria Villa (2)
- 1970–71 – Gus Sports
- 1971–72 – Railway Rovers
- 1972–73 – Woodford Town
- 1973–74 – Railway Rovers
- 1974–75 – Islington Stanley
- 1975–76 – Islington Stanley (2)
- 1976–77 – Railway Rovers
- 1977–78 – Cricketers
- 1978–79 – Railway Rovers (4)
- 1979–80 – Cricketers
- 1980–81 – Cricketers (3)
- 1981–82 – Prince of Wales
- 1982–83 – Joiners
- 1983–84 – Alexander
- 1984–85 – M.G Sports
- 1985–86 – M.G Sports
- 1986–87 – M.G Sports
- 1987–88 – M.G Sports
- 1988–89 – M.G Sports (5)
- 1989–90 – Orderll Arms
- 1990–91 – Hoxton
- 1991–92 – Orderll Arms
- 1992–93 – Corwn & Manor
- 1993–94 – Hoxton
- 1994–95 – Titan
- 1995–96 – Titan (2)
- 1996–97 – Ordel (3)
- 1997–98 – Bancroft United
- 1998–99 – Bricklayers Arms
- 1999–00 – Hoxton (3)
- 2000–01 – Bancroft United
- 2001–02 – Lions
- 2002–03 – Hoxton Athletic
- 2003–04 – Eureka
- 2004–05 – Bancroft United (3)
- 2005–06 – Hoxton Athletic (2)
- 2006–07 – Lapton
- 2007–08 – Lapton
- 2008–09 – Lapton
- 2009–10 – Lapton (4)
- 2010–11 – Real Romania
- 2011–12 – Black Meteors
- 2012–13 – Phoenix
- 2013–14 – FC Bartlett
- 2014–15 – Clapton Rangers
- 2015–16 – Mile End
- 2016–17 –
- 2017–18 –
- 2018–19 –
- 2019–20 – abandoned
- 2020–21 – Mile End Baiteze Squad
- 2021–22 – Middlesbrough Supporters South
- 2022–23 – Baddoo FC
- 2023–24 – FC Niva
- 2024–25 – Boundary Estate
- 2025–26 – FC Niva (2)

- Remarks: The 2019-20 season was abandoned due to the COVID-19 pandemic.

Division One as top tier in bold (1952-1956).

=== Division One ===
Founded in 1951 as the top division and was replaced by the Premier League in 1956. It returned in 1958 as second tier.

- 1958–59 – Lordship
- 1959–60 – Kings Head
- 1960–61 – Lordship (2)
- 1961–62 – Barrowside
- 1962–63 – Lea United
- 1963–64 – Coolingwood
- 1964–65 – Cooling wood (2)
- 1965–66 – Islington Stanley
- 1966–67 – Eastern
- 1967–68 – Market House
- 1968–69 – Tonbridge Ferox
- 1969–70 – no record
- 1970–71 – Kentish Town
- 1971–72 – White Lion
- 1972–73 – Woodford Town B
- 1973–74 – Guilford
- 1974–75 – St Monica's
- 1975–76 – Rayjack
- 1976–77 – Raybek
- 1977–78 – Rydley
- 1978–79 – London Tavern
- 1979–80 – Carehouse
- 1980–81 – Aquarius
- 1981–82 – Alexander
- 1982–83 – Monteith
- 1983–84 – Telegraph
- 1984–85 – White Horse
- 1985–86 – Rilcrest Green Man
- 1986–87 – Richmond
- 1987–88 – Chats
- 1988–89 – Ordell Arms
- 1989–90 – William Hughes
- 1990–91 – Brownlow Arms
- 1991–92 – Clarendon
- 1992–93 – Bow Athletic
- 1993–94 – Hackney Volunteers
- 1994–95 – Trafalgar
- 1995–96 – Nags Head
- 1996–97 – Wheatsheaf Wdrs
- 1997–98 – Three Compasses
- 1998–99 – Whiston Belgrave
- 1999–00 – AC Eleanor
- 2000–01 – Eureka
- 2001–02 – Down The Hatch
- 2002–03 – Lions
- 2003–04 – Olde Hope
- 2004–05 – Santos Athletic
- 2005–06 – Lapton
- 2006–07 – Albion Manor
- 2007–08 – Clapton Rangers
- 2008–09 – Army & Navy N16
- 2009–10 – FC Metwin
- 2010–11 – Hackney Borough
- 2011–12 – FC Bartlett
- 2012–13 – Mustard
- 2013–14 – Shakespeare
- 2014–15 – FC Krystal
- 2015–16 – El Valiente
- 2016–17 –
- 2017–18 –
- 2018–19 –
- 2019–20 –
- 2020–21 – Crondall FC
- 2021–22 – City East
- 2022–23 – Boundary Estate
- 2023–24 – Azteca
- 2024–25 – Lymore Gardens
- 2025–26 – Crondall (2)

=== Division Two ===
Founded in 1953 as the second tier, returned in 1957. It is now considered the third tier.

- 1953–54 – St Augustines
- 1957–58 – Spears
- 1958–59 – Globe Villa
- 1959–60 – no record
- 1960–61 – United Services
- 1961–62 – Lordship
- 1962–63 – Prince George
- 1963–64 – Arcola
- 1964–65 – Norville
- 1965–66 – Hackney Volunteer
- 1966–67 – Tiger
- 1967–68 – Dagmar
- 1968–69 – Windsor
- 1969–70 – no record
- 1970–71 – Swan United
- 1971–72 – St Peter's
- 1972–73 – Rayjack
- 1973–74 – Brunswick Albion
- 1974–75 – St Mathias
- 1975–76 – Jolly Farmers
- 1976–77 – Brickfield Galloway
- 1977–78 – Hoxton Athletic
- 1978–79 – Highbury Athletic
  G.F Leisure
- 1979–80 – Senrab
- 1980–81 – Woodville
  White Horse
- 1981–82 – M.G Sports
- 1982–83 – Telegraph
- 1983–84 – Needlegun
- 1984-85 – Directors
- 1985-86 – Melford
- 1986-87 – The Albert
- 1987-88 – Norfolk Arms
- 1988-89 – Marion Arms
- 1989-90 – Midfield (D.O.W.)
- 1990–91 – Bow Athletic
- 1991–92 – Lithuanian Victoria
- 1992–93 – Freemasons Arms
- 1993–94 – Crown & Manor
- 1994–95 – Wheatshead Wdrs
- 1995–96 – Ones FC
- 1996–97 – Three Compasses
- 1997–98 – Palm Tree
- 1998–99 – The Cambridge
- 1999–00 – Eureka
- 2000–01 – Wellington Victoria
- 2001–02 – OId Hope
- 2002–03 – Caspels
- 2003–04 – Wellington Lyons
- 2004–05 – Lapton
- 2005–06 – Army & Navy N16
- 2006–07 – FC Kenton
- 2007–08 – Lancresse Rangers
- 2008–09 – Hospital Tavern
- 2009–10 – Hare & Hounds
- 2010–11 – Shakespeare
- 2011–12 – Mustard FC
- 2012–13 – Chapel N1
- 2013–14 – Athletico Angels
- 2014–15 – Angel And Crown
- 2015–16 – FC Stepney
- 2016–17 –
- 2017–18 –
- 2018–19 –
- 2019–20 –
- 2020–21 – City East
- 2021–22 – Boundary Estate
- 2022–23 – The Gun FC
- 2023–24 – Docklands
- 2024–25 – London Jaguars FC
- 2025–26 – Onetouchables

=== Division Three ===
Founded in 1949.

- **1949–50** – Parnell
- **1950–51** – Gospal
- **1951–52** – Victoria
- **1952–53** – Welwyn
- **1953–54** – Kings Cross
- **1954–55** – Monarchs
- **1955–56** –
- **1956–57** – Lions FC
- **1957–58** –
- **1958–59** – No Record
- **1959–60** – No Record
- **1960–61** – Key & Whiting
- **1961–62** – Arcola
- **1962–63** – Hackney Downs
- **1963–64** – Arden
- **1964–65** – Methley
- **1965–66** – Windsor
- 1966–67 – Dagmar
- 1967–68 – No Record
- 1968–69 – Fieldway
- 1969–70 – No Record
- 1970–71 – W G D Social
- 1971–72 – No Record
- 1972–73 – St Monica's
- 1973–74 – St Mathias
- 1974–75 – Old Ford Greyhound
- 1975–76 – Rising Sun
- 1976–77 – Riva
- 1977–78 – Highbury Athletic
- 1978–79 – Clothwokers
  M.G Sports
- 1979–80 – Brownswood B
  White Horse
- 1980–81 – Lucca
- 1981–82 – Stonewood
- 1982–83 – Iceland
- 1983–84 – Rilcrest
- 1984–85 – Chats
- 1985–86 – Richmond
- 1986–87 – Hale End
- 1987–88 – Lithuanian 'A'
- 1988–89 – Midfield (D.O.W.)
- 1989–90 – Bow Athletic
- 1990–91 – Clarendon
- 1991–92 – Woodville
- 1992–93 – Ranelagh Arms
- 1993–94 – Whitehouse (2)
- 1994–95 – Resolute
- 1995–96 – Three Compasses
- 1996–97 – Dewdrop
- 1997–98 – Foresters Arms
- 1998–99 – St Georges
- 1999–00 – Wellington Victoria
- 2000–01 – Swans
- 2001–02 – London Aprilia
- 2002–03 – Lyons
- 2003–04 – Lapton
- 2004–05 – Chimes
- 2005–06 – Midfield
- 2006–07 – Walthamstow Village
- 2007–08 – FC Highstone
- 2008–09 – Tottenham Phoenix
- 2009–10 – Hackney Borough
- 2010–11 – Comets
- 2011–12 – Chapel Old Boys
- 2012–13 – Walthamstow Village (2)
- 2013–14 – City Flyers
- 2014–15 – Chapel United
- 2015–16 – Boston Celtics
- 2016–17 –
- 2017–18 –
- 2018–19 –
- 2019–20 –
- 2020–21 – Athletico DFZ
- 2021–22 – Clapton Community
- 2022–23 – FC Karpaty
- 2023–24 – Lymore Gardens
- 2024–25 – Limehouse Tigres
- 2025–26 – Spartan Athletic United

=== Division Four ===
Founded in 1948.Not played after 2025.

- **1948–49** – Fairmead
- **1949–50** – Grove United
- **1950–51** – Lustys & Grey Green
- **1951–52** – Globe Villa
- **1952–53** – Outcasts
- **1953–54** – Downham
- **1954–55** – Whitmore
- **1955–56** – No Division
- **1956–57** – Arcola FC
- **1957–58** – No Division
- **1958–59** – No Division
- **1959–60** – A. T Transport
- **1960–61** – Key & Whiting
- **1961–62** – Arcola
- **1962–63** – Norville
- **1963–64** – Arden
- **1964–65** – Albion
- **1965–66** – No Division
- 1966–67 – Dagmar
- 1967–68 – No Division
- 1968–69 – No Division
- 1969–70 – No Division
- 1970–71 – No Division
- 1971–72 – No Division
- 1972–73 – Leyton Windsor
- 1973–74 – Rising Sun
- 1974–75 – Riva
- 1975–76 – Brickfield Galloway
- 1976–77 – Juventus
- 1977–78 – Duchess of Kent
- 1978–79 – Arcola (3)
- 1979–80 – Builders Arms
- 1980–81 – Hoxton Athletic
- 1981–82 – Monteith
- 1982–83 – Upton House
- 1983–84 – Inter
- 1984–85 – Eastside
- 1985–86 – Misfits
- 1986–87 – Lithuanian Victori
- 1987–88 – Spread Eagle
- 1988–89 – Hoxton Colts
- 1989–90 – Horse & Groom
- 1990–91 – Lithuanian Victoria B
- 1991–92 – The Woodman
- 1992–93 – London Tavern
- 1993–94 – Allborough United
- 1994–95 – AC Dynamo
- 1995–96 – AC Dynamo (2)
- 1996–97 – Pint Pot
- 1997–98 – Albert
- 1998–99 – Lucca
- 1999–00 – Dukes Bridge
- 2000–01 – Stanton
- 2001–02 – Amhurst Arms
- 2002–03 – Lapton
- 2003–04 – FC Welly
- 2004–05 – Army & Navy N16
- 2005–06 – No Division
- 2006–07 – No Division
- 2007–08 – No Division
- 2008–09 – AC Islington
- 2009–10 – Florist Arms
- 2010–11 – Chapel Old Boys
- 2011–12 –
- 2012–13 –
- 2013–14 –
- 2014–15 – Wojak Sunday
- 2015–16 –
- 2016–17 –
- 2017–18 –
- 2018–19 –
- 2019–20 –
- 2020–21 –
- 2021–22 –
- 2022–23 – The Gun FC II
- 2023–24 –
- 2024–25 –

=== Division Five ===
Lasted for only 3 seasons.

- 1975–76 – British Oak
- 1976–77 – Alexander
- 1977–78 – White Horse B

== Cup winners ==
=== Dickie Davies Cup ===
The cup was established in 1980 to honor Dickie Davies, the league's long-time Registration Secretary.

- 1981–82 – Joiners
- 1982–83 – Joiners
- 1983–84 – Joiners (3)
- 1984–85 – M.G Sports
- 1985–86 – Monteith
- 1986–87 – Chats
- 1987–88 – Norfolk Arms
- 1988–89 – M.G Sports
- 1989–90 – Poplar Park
- 1990–91 – Dock Settlement
- 1991–92 – Country Flyer
- 1992–93 – Ordell
- 1993–94 – Bow Athletic
- 1994–95 – Titan
- 1995–96 – Ordell Arms
- 1996–97 – Ordell
- 1997–98 – Ordell (3)
- 1998–99 – Queensbridge
- 1999–00 – AC Eleanor
- 2000–01 – Hoxton Athletic
- 2001–02 – London Aprilia
- 2002–03 – Eureka
- 2003–04 – Eureka (2)
- 2004–05 – Bancroft United
- 2005–06 – Hoxton Athletic (2)
- 2006–07 – Albion Manor
- 2007–08 – Clapton Rangers
- 2008–09 – Lapton
- 2009–10 – Lapton
- 2010–11 – Lapton
- 2011–12 – Lapton (4)
- 2012–13 – Black Meteors
- 2013–14 – Black Meteors
- 2014–15 – Clapton Rangers (2)
- 2015–16 – Black Meteors (3)
- 2016–17 –
- 2017–18 –
- 2018–19 – Mile End Baiteze Squad
- 2019–20 – *
- 2020–21 –
- 2021–22 – FC Niva
- 2022–23 – Baddoo FC
- 2023–24 – London Jaguars FC (Note: London Jaguars FC beat Crondall FC. Final Score: 3–3 after extra time, decided by a penalty shootout. Played on 16 May 2024, at the Old Spotted Dog Ground)
- 2024–25 – Hackney Borough FC (Note: Hackney Borough FC won the 2024/25 Dickie Davies Cup beating Baddoo FC 3-0)
- 2025–26 – FC Niva (2) (Note: The final between Boundary Estate and FC Nyva took place on Sunday, 7 June 2026 at the BetWright Stadium (the home of Leyton Orient ), with a 12:30 PM kick-off.)

- Remarks: The 2019-20 season was abandoned due to the COVID-19 pandemic.

=== Albert Daniels Cup ===
The league's first cup competition, known as the Dave Taylor Cup (1972-1999). Started in 1952.

- 1952–53 – Stoke United FC
- 1953–54 – Lea United
- 1954–55 – Lea United (2)
- 1955–56 – United Services
- 1956–57 – United Services (2)
- 1957–58 –
- 1958–59 – Tiger
- 1959–60 – Chatsworth
- 1960–61 – No Record
- 1961–62 – No Record
- 1962–63 – Kings Head
- 1963–64 – Lordship
- 1964–65 – Mount FC
- 1965–66 – Gus Sports
- 1966–67 – Gus Sports
- 1967–68 – Gus Sports (3)
- 1968–69 – Victoria
- 1969–70 – No Record
- 1970–71 – Islington Stanley
- 1971–72 – No Record
- 1972–73 – No Record
- 1973–74 – Eastern
- 1974–75 – Woodford Tavern
- 1975–76 – Islington Stanley
- 1976–77 – Brickfield
- 1977–78 – Dinmore
- 1978–79 – Cricketers
- 1979–80 – Cricketers
- 1980–81 – St. Monica's
- 1981–82 – Prince of Wales
- 1982–83 – Joiners
- 1983–84 – Alexander
- 1984–85 – Monteith
- 1985–86 – Monteith
- 1986–87 – Monteith (3)
- 1987–88 – Richmond
- 1988–89 – M.G Sports
- 1989–90 – Ordell Arms
- 1990–91 – Hoxton A
- 1991–92 – Ordell Arms
- 1992–93 – Ordell (Iceland)
- 1993–94 – Hoxton Athletic
- 1994–95 – Titan
- 1995–96 – Bricklayers Arms
- 1996–97 – Ordell
- 1997–98 – Ordell (4)
- 1998–99 – Void Competition
- 1999–00 – Hoxton Athletic
- 2000–01 – Hoxton Athletic (3)
- 2001–02 – Eureka
- 2002–03 – Eureka (2)
- 2003–04 – Bancroft United
- 2004–05 – Lapton
- 2005–06 – Bancroft United
- 2006–07 – Bancroft United (3)
- 2007–08 – Lapton
- 2008–09 – Lapton (3)
- 2009–10 – Real Romania
- 2010–11 – Black Meteors
- 2011–12 – Hackney Borough
- 2012–13 – FC Bartlett
- 2013–14 – FC Bartlett
- 2014–15 – FC Bartlett (3)
- 2015–16 – Highfield (Note: Highfield beat London Young Meteors in March 2016)
- 2016–17 –
- 2017–18 –
- 2018–19 – FC Nyva
- 2019–20 –
- 2020–21 –
- 2021–22 –
- 2022–23 – CSM London
- 2023–24 – City East
- 2024–25 – Boundary Estate
- 2025–26 – City East (2)

=== Jack Walpole Cup ===
The competition started in 1972.

- 1972–73 – Monica's
- 1973–74 – Brunswick Albion
- 1974–75 – Old Ford Greyhound
- 1975–76 – Scala
- 1976–77 – Alexander
- 1977–78 – Cricketers
- 1978–79 – Cricketers
- 1979–80 – Cricketers (3)
- 1980–81 – Aquarius
- 1981–82 – Joiners
- 1982–83 – Joiners (2)
- 1983–84 – Alexander (2)
- 1984–85 – White House
- 1985–86 – Monteith
- 1986–87 – Monteith (2)
- 1987–88 – Chats
- 1988–89 – Melford
- 1989–90 – Ordell Arms
- 1990–91 – Dock Settlement
- 1991–92 – Country Fayre
- 1992–93 – Hoxton Athletic
- 1993–94 – Sun Athletic
- 1994–95 – Wanstead Park
- 1995–96 – Eastwood
- 1996–97 – Titan
- 1997–98 – Clarendon
- 1998–99 – Clarendon (2)
- 1999–00 – Hoxton Athletic
- 2000–01 – Birlik Spor
- 2001–02 – Hoxton Athletic
- 2002–03 – Hoxton Athletic (4)
- 2003–04 – St Georges
- 2004–05 – Eureka
- 2005–06 – Three Compasses
- 2006–07 – Chimes
- 2007–08 – Lapton
- 2008–09 – Clapton Rangers
- 2009–10 – Clapton Rangers
- 2010–11 – Lapton
- 2011–12 – Lapton (3)
- 2012–13 – Clapton Rangers (3)
- 2013–14 – Black Meteors
- 2014–15 – Mile End
- 2015–16 – Mile End
- 2016–17 – Mile End (3)
- 2017–18 – Balteze Squad
- 2018–19 –
- 2019–20 –
- 2020–21 –
- 2021–22 –
- 2022–23 –
- 2023–24 – City East FC
- 2024–25 – FC Nyva (Note: Nyva beat Wojak Sunday FC in May 2025)
- 2025–26 –

=== Jack Morgan Cup ===
The competition started in 1973.

- 1973–74 – Railway Rovers
- 1974–75 – Islington Stanley
- 1975–76 – Cricketers
- 1976–77 – M.G Sports
- 1977–78 – Culford
- 1978–79 – Clapton Park
- 1979–80 – White Horse
- 1980–81 – William Hughes
- 1981–82 – M.G Sports (2)
- 1982–83 – Florist
- 1983–84 – Huckles
- 1984–85 – Rilcrest
- 1985–86 – Melford
- 1986–87 – Stag
- 1987–88 – Lucca
- 1988–89 – Marion Arms
- 1989–90 – Midfield (D.O.W)
- 1990–91 – Clarendon
- 1991–92 – Lithuanian Victoria
- 1992–93 – Hackney Volunteer
- 1993–94 – Maynell
- 1994–95 – Nags Head
- 1995–96 – Three Compasses
- 1996–97 – Maynell (2)
- 1997–98 – Palm Tree
- 1998–99 – AC Dynamo
- 1999–00 – Down The Hatch
- 2000–01 – Wellington Victoria
- 2001–02 – Caspels
- 2002–03 – Caspels (2)
- 2003–04 – Lapton
- 2004–05 – Chimes
- 2005–06 – Army & Navy N16
- 2006–07 – FC Kenton
- 2007–08 – Midfield
- 2008–09 – FC Highstone
- 2009–10 – Midfield (Hackney)
- 2010–11 – Tottenham Phoenix
- 2011–12 – Mustard FC
- 2012–13 – Chapel N1
- 2013–14 – FC Duchess
- 2014–15 – Delta Athletic
- 2015–16 – Lymore Gardens (Note: won the 2016 Jack Morgan Cup final by defeating Flamingo FC with a final score of 6–3.)
- 2016–17 –
- 2017–18 –
- 2018–19 –
- 2019–20 –
- 2020–21 –
- 2021–22 –
- 2022–23 –
- 2023–24 – Lymore Gardens (2)
- 2024–25 –
- 2025–26 – The Wenlock (Note: The Wenlock defeated Limited Pros 5–3 on penalties following a 2–2 draw in regular and extra time after coming back from a 2–0 deficit.)

=== Hackney and Leyton Junior Cup ===
For lower division-clubs. Organised by Hackney Gazette newspaper, started in 1995. Renamed to Jonnie Walker Cup in 2024.

- 1995–96 – Royal Duchess
- 1996–97 – Bricklayers Arms
- 1997–98 – AC Eleanor
- 1998–99 – Bricklayers Arms (2)
- 1999–00 – Wellington Victoria
- 2000–01 – Morgan FC
- 2001–02 – Old George
- 2002–03 – Shkodra
- 2003–04 – St. Georges
- 2004–05 – Lyons
- 2005–06 – Shakespeare
- 2006–07 – St. Georges
- 2007–08 – Gascoyne
- 2008–09 – OKJH
- 2009–10 – Bancroft United
- 2010–11 – Black Meteors
- 2011–12 – Albion Manor
- 2012–13 – FC Status
- 2013–14 – Top Red
- 2014–15 – Boroughs United
- 2022-23 - The Gun II (Note: Gun II beat Wenlock 3-2)
- 2023-24 - Lymore Gardens
- 2024-25 - Delta Athletic (Note: Delta Athletic beat East London Spartans in the final)
- 2025-26 - AFC Shooters (Note: AFC Shooters played Bow Badgers B on Sunday 17 May 2026 at 11:00 AM)

=== Hackney Marshes Super Cup ===
Tournament starts in January and ends in May.

- 2024-25: Lymore Gardens FC
- 2025-26: Boundary Estate (Note: They claimed the trophy after defeating Hackney Borough 2–1 in a tightly contested final played in late May 2026)

=== London FA Cups ===
The HLSL clubs are eligible to play in County cups organised by London FA. They have won the following County cups on the years below:

==== London Sunday Intermediate Cup ====
- 1992-93: Ordell Arms
- 1993-94: Ordell (Iceland)
- 1998-99: Bricklayers
- 2005-06: Albion Manor
- 2007-08: Eureka
- 2008-09: Clapton Rangers

==== London Sunday Challenge Cup ====
- 1971-72: Islington Stanley
- 1977-78: Cricketers

==== London Sunday Junior Cup ====
For lower division clubs.

- 1991-92: Sutton
- 2007-08: Clapton Rangers

== Records and statistics ==
- M.G Sports have won the Premier Division 5 times.
- Lapton FC have won the prestigious Dickie Davis Cup 4 times.
- Ordell Arms/Ordell have won the Albert Daniels Cup, also known as the Dave Taylor Cup, 4 times.
- Hoxton Athletic won the Jack Walpole Cup 4 times.
- M.G Sports, Maynell, Caspels won the Jack Morgan Cup 2 times.
- Bricklayers Arms won the Hackney and Leyton Junior Cup, held by Hackney Gazette, 2 times.
- Soke United (as top tier), Lordship, Collingwood and Crondall FC have won the Division One 2 times.
- No team have won the Division Two more than once.
- Walthamstow Village and White Horse have won the Division Three 2 times.
- Arcola FC have won the Division Four 3 times.
- Lapton is the most decorated club with at least 19 trophies.
- Brisbane Road has historically hosted most of the cup finals, while recently they have been played at the Hackney Marshes Centre.
- Longest-running club was Midfield, founded in 1967.
- Longest serving manager was Midfield's Stan Gittings for over 40 years, since 1967.

== Performance by club ==
Most Decorated Clubs
Club	Total Titles	Premier Division / Division One (Top Tier)	Lower Divisions (Tiers 2–5)	Dickie Davies Cup	Albert Daniels Cup (Dave Taylor Cup)	Jack Walpole Cup	Jack Morgan Cup	Hackney and Leyton Junior Cup	Hackney Marshes Super Cup	London FA Cups
Lapton	19	4	3	4	3	3	1	1	—	—
Hoxton Athletic	17	3	—	2	5	4	2	1	—	—
Ordell Arms	15	3	1	3	4	1	1	—	—	2
M.G Sports	11	5	1	2	1	—	2	—	—	—
Clapton Rangers	10	1	1	2	—	3	1	—	—	2
Eureka	10	1	2	2	2	1	1	—	—	1
Bancroft United	9	3	—	1	3	—	—	1	—	—
Lordship	7	3	3	—	1	—	—	—	—	—
Joiners	7	1	—	3	1	2	—	—	—	—
Monteith	7	—	2	1	3	1	—	—	—	—
FC Nyva	7	2	—	2	1	1	—	—	—	—
Boundary Estate	6	1	3	—	1	—	—	—	1	—
Arcola FC	6	—	5	—	—	—	1	—	—	—
Cricketers	6	3	—	—	2	—	1	—	—	—
United Services	5	2	1	—	2	—	—	—	—	—
Lymore Gardens	4	—	2	—	—	—	2	—	1	—
Black Meteors	4	1	—	3	—	—	—	—	—	—
Mile End	4	1	—	—	—	3	—	—	—	—

== Notable players ==
The following players either started their careers from the league or featured in later stages.

- (England) David Beckham
- (England) Sol Campbell
- (England) Rio Ferdinand
- (England) Bedford Jezzard
- (England) Jimmy Greaves
- (England) Bobby Moore
- (England) Stuart Pearce
- (England) John Terry
- (England) Ian Wright
- (Greece) Ntinos Pontikas

== Notable clubs ==
- Senrab
- Lapton

== See also ==
- Camden Sunday Football League
- Orpington and Bromley District Sunday Football League

== Sources ==
- ARCHIVES: DIVISIONAL WINNERS
- ARCHIVES: CUP WINNERS
- ARCHIVES: REFEREE OF THE YEAR
