= Senrab F.C. =

Association football club in England

- Full name: Senrab Football Club
- Founded: 1961
- Ground: Wanstead Flats, Forest Gate, London
- Chairman: Dave Hyland
- League: Echo Junior Football League
- Website: https://www.senrab-fc-official-website.com/
Home colours

Senrab F.C. is a Sunday League football club, based at Wanstead Flats in the Forest Gate district of London, England. It is noted for the high number of professional players who played for the club in their youth.

== History ==
The club takes its name from Senrab Street in Stepney; the club's players trained at Marion Richardson School on Senrab Street (which is close to Barnes Street, and is 'Barnes' spelt backwards).

The club was founded in 1961 by then 15-year-old Jimmy Tindall (later a youth development officer for West Ham United), playing eight-a-side at first before progressing to 11-a-side within two years. Tindall's son, Jason was a 1990s product of Senrab, playing in midfield with Lee Bowyer before later moving to AFC Bournemouth. The club had three 11-a-side teams to begin with, all playing in the Regent's Park Youth League. Tindall's recruitment policy was to pick up only the best young players, stipulating that to play for Senrab, a player must have previously played for his district or county. In the early 1970s, so many Senrab players signed for Chelsea that former player Ray Lewington nicknamed Senrab "Chelsea Juniors". In 1980 Senrab's senior team won the title in the Division Two of the Hackney and Leyton Sunday Football League and earned promotion.

In 2014 Senrab were shortlisted for the Daily Mirror Pride of Sport Awards in the Local Team of the Year category.

== Operation ==
Senrab operates 15 teams for age groups ranging from 5 to 17 years old. The club has produced a great number of players who have gone on to have successful professional careers, including Sol Campbell, Jermain Defoe, Ledley King, Bobby Zamora, John Terry and Ezri Konsa. Zamora, Jlloyd Samuel, King and Terry were teammates featuring in the 1993–94 Cup Final against Waltham Forest in the U-13 Echo Junior Football League.

A number of professional coaches have also started out at Senrab, most notably Dario Gradi, who, until June 2007, was the longest-serving football manager in the Football League. In April 2011, former Senrab player John Terry donated an undisclosed sum to the club to keep it running.

== Former players ==
The following players and coaches have all gone on to play for or coach a professional football club after leaving Senrab FC.

=== Players ===
- (Nigeria) Ade Akinbiyi
- (England) Adebayo Akinfenwa
- (Ghana) Cliff Akurang
- (England) Lee Bowyer
- (England) Sol Campbell
- (England) Scott Canham
- (England) Gary Chivers
- (England) Alan Curbishley
- (England) Jermain Defoe
- (England) Ugo Ehiogu
- (Jamaica) Simon Ford
- (England) Jonathan Fortune
- (England) Leo Fortune-West
- (England) Fitz Hall
- (England) Vince Hilaire
- (England) Terry Hurlock
- (England) Kemal Izzet
- (Turkey) Muzzy Izzet
- (Malta) Jodi Jones
- (England) David Kerslake
- (England) Ledley King
- (England) Leon Knight
- (England) Paul Konchesky
- (England) Ezri Konsa
- (England) Tommy Langley
- (England) Ray Lewington
- (England) Teddy Maybank
- (England) Kevin Nicholls
- (England) David Robson
- (Trinidad and Tobago) Jlloyd Samuel
- (England) Terry Skiverton
- (England) John Sparrow
- (England) John Terry
- (England) Jason Tindall
- (England) Sanchez Watt
- (England) Ray Wilkins
- (England) Bobby Zamora

=== Coaches ===
- (England) Tony Carr
- (England) Alan Curbishley
- (Italy) Dario Gradi
- (England) Ray Wilkins
- (England) Ray Lewington
- (England) Lee Bowyer
- (England) Sol Campbell

== Honours ==
- Hackney and Leyton Division Two: 1979-80

== Sources ==
- Hayward, Paul (7 April 2004). "Dedicated learner has eyes on late call". Telegraph.co.uk. London: Telegraph Media Group.
- Slot, Owen (19 May 2007). "Foundations ripped from under club that inspired Terry's golden generation". The Times. London: Times Newspapers. Archived from the original on 23 May 2011.
- Szcezepanik, Nick (30 December 2002). "Doors still open at fame academy; The battle for survival at the Senrab Boys Club in East London". The Times. Times Newspapers.
