= FA Sunday Cup =

- Founded: 1964
- Region: England
- Current champions: Home Bargains
- Most championships: Hetton Lyons Cricket Club (4 titles)
- Website: https://www.thefa.com/competitions/grassroots/fa-sunday-cup

The FA Sunday Cup is a knock-out amateur competition founded in 1964 for English Sunday league football teams.

Prior to 1960 The Football Association did not permit clubs or players under its jurisdiction to take part in competitive football played on Sunday. A change of policy by the governing body in 1960 allowed Sunday leagues to become affiliated to County Associations and, four years later, The FA started the Sunday Cup to allow Sunday players to compete in a national knock-out tournament.

The Sunday Cup trophy was presented to the FA by the Shah of Iran as a gift to mark the centenary of the FA in 1963. It was created by Iranian silversmiths.

In the Cup's first season (1964–65), teams representing Sunday players in various counties entered with London winning the two-legged final 6–2 against Staffordshire.

In the first final featuring club sides, Ubique United beat Aldridge Fabrications 1–0 in 1965–66.

After The Sunday Cup’s inaugural season, 1,600 requests for entry forms for the following season’s competition were received. Entries for season 2017–18 were 80. Since its inception in 1964-65 (53 years ago) the competition has been won by 42 different sides.

The most successful team is Hetton Lyons Cricket Club FC with 4 wins, in 2006, 2008, 2010, and 2012. St Joseph's (Luton) have appeared in a record seven finals, winning on three occasions in 1995, 1996 and 2023. Eight teams have been successful on two occasions – Carlton United in 1967 and '73, Newtown Unity in 1972 and '74, Fantail in 1980 and '81, Nicosia in 1991 and 2004, Oyster Martyrs in 2011 and '13, Humbledon Plains Farm in 1990 and 2014, Hardwick Social in 2017 and 2018, and Campfield FC in 2015 and 2020.

In 2018, Hardwick Social FC became the first club for 22 years to retain the trophy since St Joseph's (Luton) in 1995-96.

The latest holders are Home Bargains who beat Hartlepool AFC Supporters 3–1 on penalties after a 1-1 draw.

== SFA Finals 1961-1965 ==
The National Sunday Football Association was founded in 1932 and re-formed in 1950. It was not affiliated to, nor recognised by the FA, and asserted itself as an alternative authority to the FA. It inaugurated a national knock-out club competition in 1960/61.

For the first few years it was an authentic national competition. However, the increasing affiliation of regional SFAs and leagues to the FA diminished the competition and it was never truly national after 1963, but it persevered for a number of seasons after the FA started their national competition. Nevertheless, the SFA winners were arguably the leading Sunday clubs remaining outside the FA affiliated Sunday leagues.

The first five finals were played at the Hare & Hounds, Leyton, East London.

| Season | Winner | Score | Runners-up |
|---|---|---|---|
| 1960–61 | Walsall Wofflers | 2-0 | Stamford Rovers |
| 1961–62 | Forest Gate Mount Athletic | 2–0 | Ashford Victoria |
| 1962-63 | Forest Gate Mount Athletic | 3-3, aet 5-3 | Chiswick East Barnes |
| 1963–64 | Forest Gate Mount Athletic | 4-1 | Hull Anlaby |
| 1964–65 | Edmonton Park United | 5-1 | Hull Esso |

== Finals since 1965 (FA sanctioned) ==
The results of the finals to date:

| Season | Winner | Score | Runners-up |
|---|---|---|---|
| 1964–65 | London | 6–2 aggregate | Staffordshire |
| 1965–66 | Ubique United | 1–0 | Aldridge Fabrications |
| 1966–67 | Carlton United | 2–0 | Stoke Works |
| 1967–68 | Drovers | 2–0 | Brook United |
| 1968–69 | Leigh Park | 3–1 | Loke United |
| 1969–70 | Vention United | 1–0 | Ubique United |
| 1970–71 | Becontree Rovers | 2–0 | Saltley United |
| 1971–72 | Newtown Unity | 4–0 | Springfield Colts |
| 1972–73 | Carlton United | 2–1 | Wear Valley |
| 1973–74 | Newtown Unity | 3–0 | Brentford East |
| 1974–75 | Fareham Town Centipedes | 1–0 | Players Athletic Engineers |
| 1975–76 | Brandon United | 2–1 | Evergreen |
| 1976–77 | Langley Park Rams Head | 2–0 | Newtown Unity |
| 1977–78 | Arras | 2–1 | Lion Rangers |
| 1978–79 | Lobster | 3–2 | Carlton United |
| 1979–80 | Fantail | 1–0 | Twin Foxes |
| 1980–81 | Fantail | 1–0 | Mackintosh |
| 1981–82 | Dingle Rail | 2–1 | Twin Foxes |
| 1982–83 | Eagle | 1–1, replay 2–1 | Lee Chapel North |
| 1983–84 | Lee Chapel North | 4–3 | Eagle |
| 1984–85 | Hobbies United | 2–2, 1–1 replay, 2–1 second replay | Avenue |
| 1985–86 | Avenue | 1–0 | Glenn Sports |
| 1986–87 | Lodge Cottrell | 1–0 | Avenue |
| 1987–88 | Nexday | 2–0 | Humbledon Plains Farm |
| 1988–89 | Almithak | 3–1 | East Levenshulme |
| 1989–90 | Humbledon Plains Farm | 2–1 | Marston Sports |
| 1990–91 | Nicosia (Liverpool) | 3–2 | Ouzavich |
| 1991–92 | Theale | 3–2 | Marston Sports |
| 1992–93 | Seymour | 1–0 | Bedfont Sunday |
| 1993–94 | Ranelagh Sports | 2–0 | Hartlepool Lion Hotel |
| 1994–95 | St Joseph's (Luton) | 2–1 | B & A Scaffolding |
| 1995–96 | St Joseph's (Luton) | 2–1 | Croxteth & Gilmoss RBL |
| 1996–97 | Marston Sports | 1–0 | Northwood |
| 1997–98 | Olympic Star | 1–1, 5–3 penalties | St Joseph's (Luton) |
| 1998–99 | Little Paxton | 2–2, 4–3 penalties | St Joseph's (Luton) |
| 1999–2000 | Prestige Brighams | 1–0 | Albion Sports |
| 2000–01 | Hartlepool Lion Hillcarter | 0–0, 3–2 penalties | Houghton Centre |
| 2001–02 | Britannia | 2–0 | Little Paxton |
| 2002–03 | Duke of York | 3–1 | Allerton |
| 2003–04 | Nicosia | 3–1 | U K Flooring |
| 2004–05 | Gossoms End | 3–2 | Albion Sports |
| 2005–06 | Hetton Lyons Cricket Club | 5–3 | St Joseph's (Luton) |
| 2006–07 | Coundon Conservative | 5–0 | Lebeq Tavern Courage |
| 2007–08 | Hetton Lyons Cricket Club | 3–2 | Coundon Conservative |
| 2008–09 | Scots Grey | 4–3 a.e.t | Oyster Martyrs |
| 2009–10 | Hetton Lyons Cricket Club | 4–2 | Magnet Tavern |
| 2010–11 | Oyster Martyrs | 1–0 | Paddock |
| 2011–12 | Hetton Lyons Cricket Club | 5–1 | Canada |
| 2012–13 | Oyster Martyrs | 4–3 | Barnes Albion |
| 2013–14 | Humbledon Plains Farm | 5–2 | Oyster Martyrs |
| 2014–15 | Campfield FC | 2–0 | OJM |
| 2015–16 | New Salamis | 1–1, 4–3 penalties | Barnes AFC |
| 2016–17 | Hardwick Social | 1–1, 3–1 penalties. | New Salamis |
| 2017-18 | Hardwick Social | 2-0 a.e.t | Gym United |
| 2018-19 | Aylesbury Flooring | 3–1 | Birstall Stamford |
| 2019-20 | Campfield FC | 1-0 A.E.T | St. Joseph's (Luton) |
| 2021-22 | Baiteze Squad | 2-0 | Highgate Albion |
| 2022-23 | St Joseph’s (Luton) | 3–2 | Aigburth Arms |
| 2023-24 | Trooper FC | 2–1 | Home Bargains |
| 2024-25 | Highgate Albion | 3-0 | North Solihull Athletic |
| 2025-26 | Home Bargains | 1–1, 3–1 penalties. | Hartlepool AFC Supporters |

== See also ==
- FA Amateur Cup
