= London Football Association =

Regional football association in England

- Abbreviation: LFA
- Formation: 1882
- Headquarters: Wembley Stadium
- Location: London HA9 OWS
- Chief Executive: Paul Bickerton
- Website: www.londonfa.com

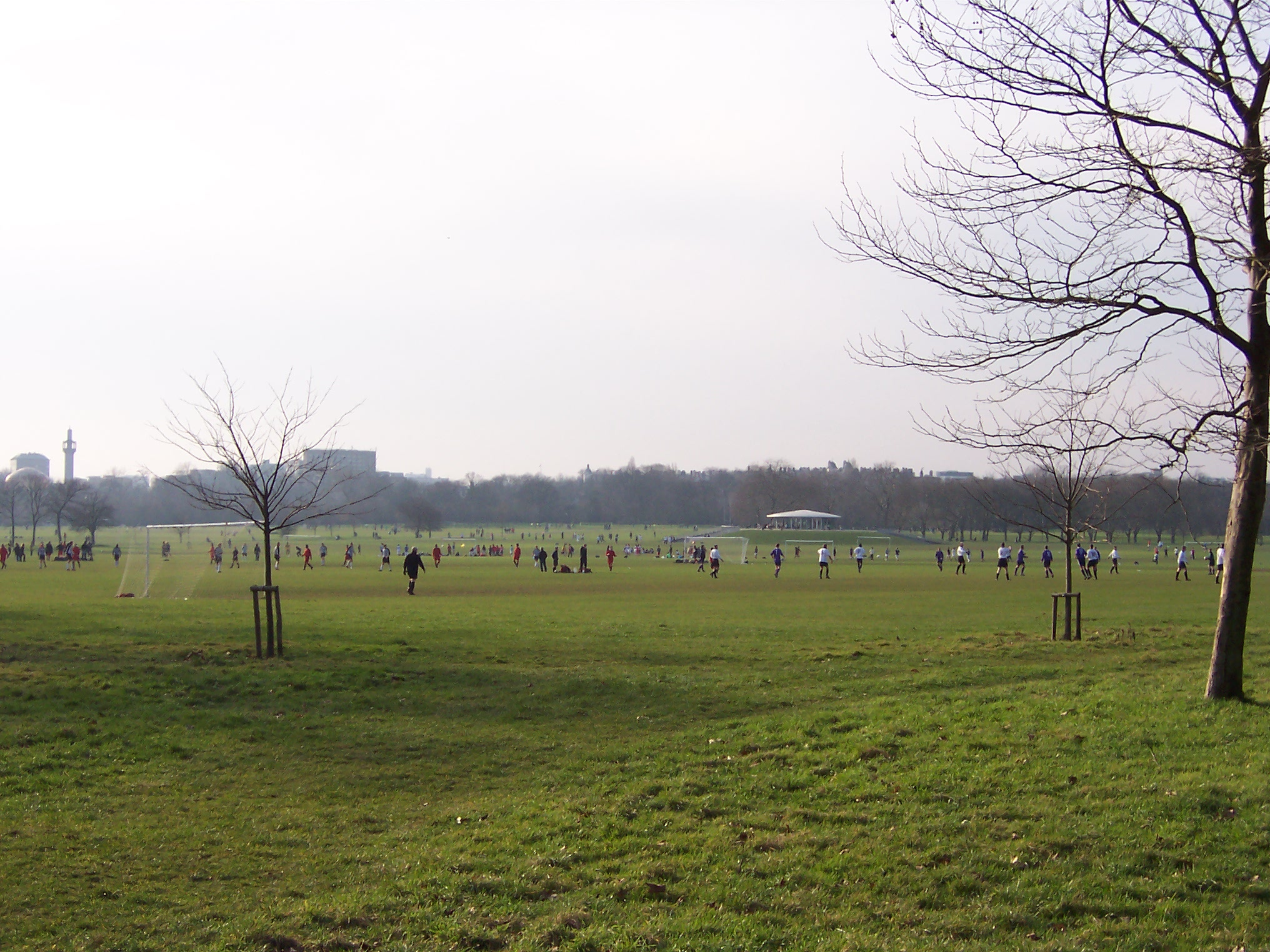
Football matches in Regent's Park

The London Football Association (LFA) is the regional Football Association for inner areas of London. The London FA was established in 1882 and is affiliated to The Football Association. The London FA administers all levels of men's, women's and youth football within its area, a circle 12 miles in radius with Charing Cross at the centre.

== History ==
The London Football Association (LFA) is unique for the reason that it is the only one founded by The Football Association. While others were founded to organise football locally around the country, Charles Alcock and Lord Kinnaird, then Secretary and Chairman of The FA, created the London FA to deal with local clubs and competitions while the main body focused on the Laws of the Game and international football matters.

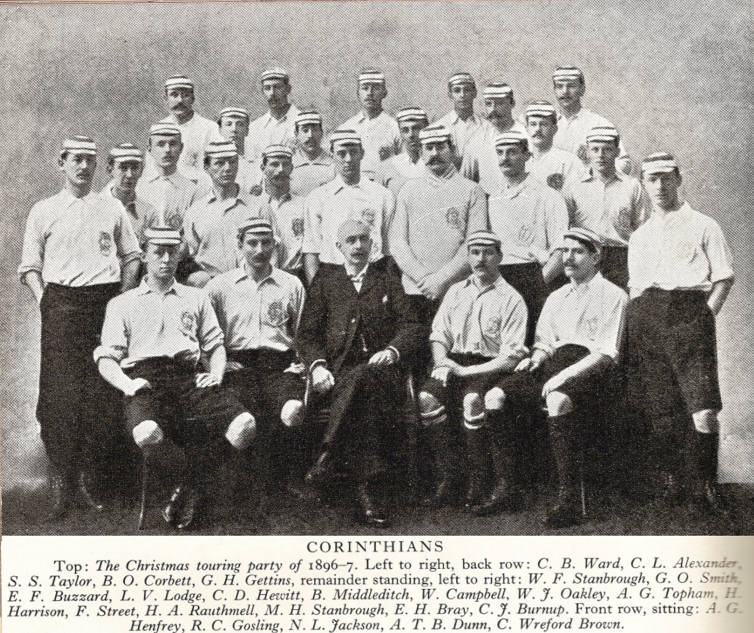
Corinthians 1896-7

According to the Memorandum on Areas and Overlapping of Associations the London FA covers the area 12 miles from Charing Cross. The association is ‘overlapped’ by a number of its colleague County FA’s: Essex FA, Kent FA, Middlesex FA, Surrey FA and the Amateur Football Alliance.

The first Secretary was N. L. 'Pa' Jackson who was also serving on the FA Council. He was famous for founding the Corinthians Football Club and is said to be the inventor of the international cap.

The London FA's other claim to fame is that its representative team was the first ever English team to play in a European final, the Inter-Cities Fairs Cup final in 1958 where they lost over two legs to Barcelona. Friendly matches had also been played against foreign opposition after the end of World War II, including annual matches in Belgium.

It has had many headquarters since its foundation in 1882, including Paternoster Row, St. Mark's College Chelsea, Finsbury Barracks, Leytonstone, Manor Park, Barking, and Lewisham. It even stayed temporarily at Upton Park and Highbury during the Second World War, having been bombed out of its previous homes. The current headquarters in Fulham were moved into in August 2004. A centenary match for the association was played in 1981 between a London XI and an England XI at Highbury, however only 5,000 fans attended.

The London Football Association is one of the biggest in the country with just under 1,000 clubs, nearly 1,500 referees and over 30 leagues.

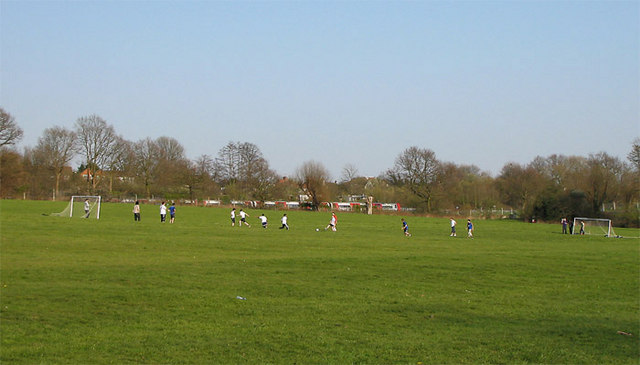
A Sunday football match in progress at Brook Farm open space.

The association has a history of long-serving, dedicated officials. For example, Tommy Kirkup served as Secretary for 44 years between 1903 and 1947. Basil Stallard is by far the longest serving Treasurer having been in that position since 1973. There have been only nine Presidents since 1882, Lionel Seymour being the current incumbent.

In 1922 the London Minor Football Association was founded for youth football. It became the London Youth Football Association and continues to administer youth football in the capital to this day. It did, however, come under the London FA Limited when it incorporated in 2001.

Both the Inner London County Schools Football Association and London Football Coaches Association work in collaboration with the London FA for the mutual benefit of its members. This provides participants in the capital with a complete range of opportunities in football.

In 2022, the London FA relocated its headquarters from Fulham to Wembley Stadium, the home of English football. The move formed part of a wider effort to strengthen its connection with the national game and improve accessibility for staff, partners, and stakeholders. In 2024, the London FA unveiled a new brand identity and strategic plan titled London For All aimed at enhancing grassroots football across the capital for the 2024 to 2028 period.

== Affiliated leagues ==
=== Men's Saturday leagues ===
- Bromley and South London Football League (2017)
- West End (London) AFA (1881)
- Wimbledon and District League (1898)

Footnote: No leagues belong to the English football league system.

=== Men's Sunday leagues ===
- Camden Sunday League (1948)
- Central London Super Sunday League (2008)
- Hackney and Leyton Sunday League (1947)
- Inner London League (2001)
- Metropolitan Sunday League (1934)
- North London Sunday League (1985)
- Southern Sunday Football League (1944)
- Sportsman's Senior Sunday League (1949)
- Wandsworth and District Sunday League (1949)
- West Fulham Sunday League (1936)
- Woolwich and Eltham Sunday Football Alliance (2006)

=== Small Sided leagues ===
- Hamlets 7-a-Side League (2007)
- Lillie Road Five-a-Side League

=== Other leagues ===
- All Nations Football Festival Summer League (2001)
- Association of Provincial Supporters Clubs in London (1983)
- Ballerz League (2008)
- Bangladesh Football Association Summer League (2007)
- Brixton Summer League
- Bromley and Croydon Christian League (1994)
- Cypriot League (KOPA) (1974)
- East London Christian League
- Football for Christ Championship (1998)
- Islington Midweek League (1973)
- Lionheart Surveyors League (2001)
- London Accountants League
- London Communities League
- London Underground League (1996)
- Maccabi (Southern) League
- Maccabi Masters League (1999)
- MPAA Internal Leagues (2007)
- Southern Veterans League
- Street League
- Thames League
- Turkish Community Football Federation (1976)

=== Ladies and girls leagues ===
- London and South East Regional Women's League
- Greater London Women's League
- Capital Girls League
- South London Girls League

=== Youth leagues ===
- Ballerz League (Youth) (2008)
- Bangladesh Football Association (UK) (Youth) (2010)
- Bexley and District Junior (and Mini-Soccer) League
- Brixton Summer League (Youth)
- Camden and Islington Youth League (1968)
- East London and Essex Junior League (1998)
- Hackney Youth League
- London County Saturday Youth League
- Maccabi GB Junior (Youth) (2007)
- Maccabi Junior League
- Positive Youth Community League (2007)
- South East London and Kent Youth League (2002)
- South London Special League (Youth) (2004)
- Tandridge Youth League
- Tandridge Youth Mini Soccer Tournament
- Turkish Community Football Federation Youth League
- Waltham Forest and District Youth League

=== Futsal leagues ===
- Futsal Super League
- Newham Futsal League
- Newham Futsal League (Youth)

=== Cup competitions ===
- Beckenham Hospital Charity Invitation Football Cup (Saturday) (1903)
- East Ham Memorial Hospital Charity Cup Competition (1901)
- Hays Property and Surveying Cup

== Disbanded or amalgamated leagues ==
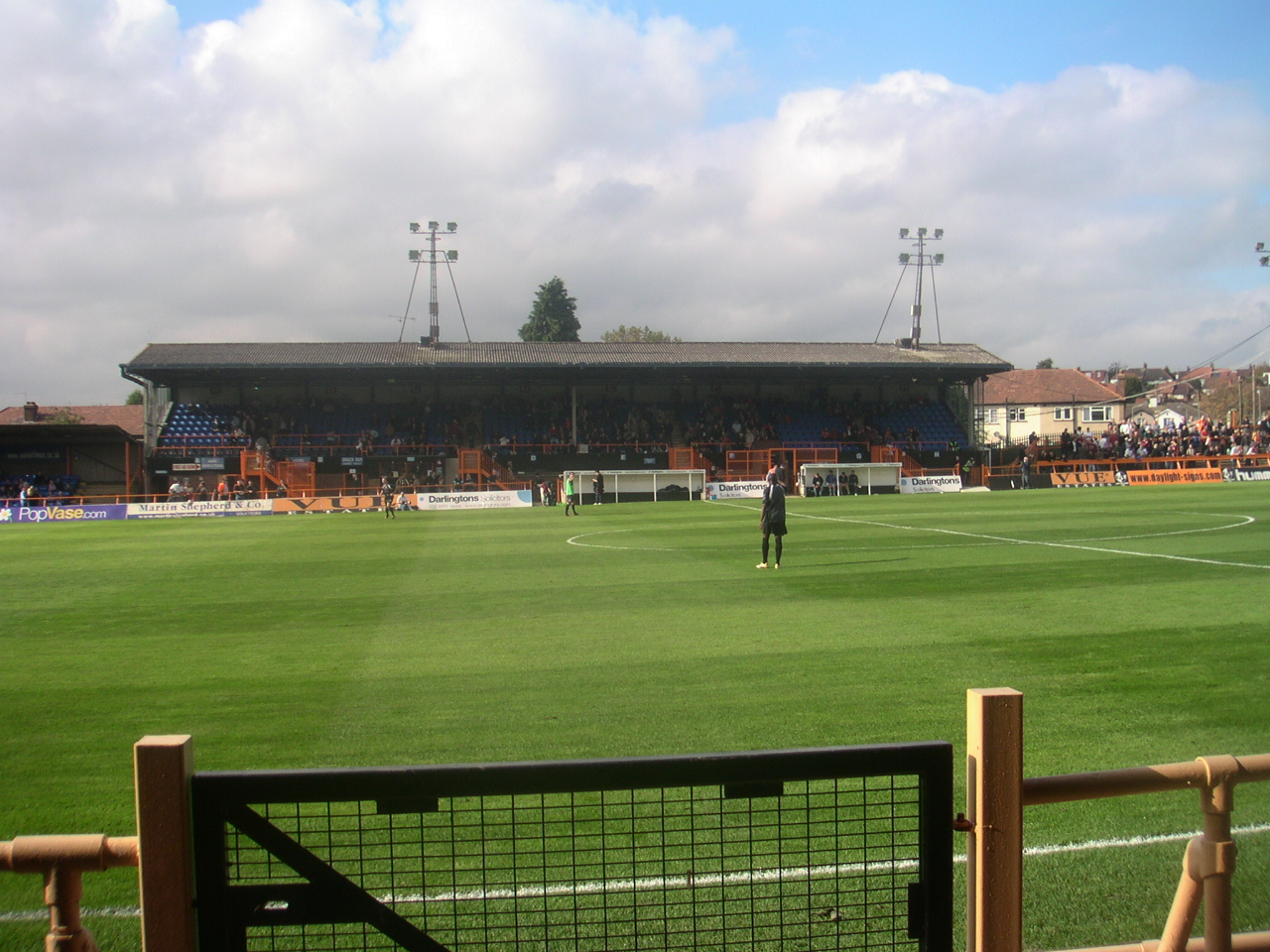
The Underhill Stadium at Barnet staged Athenian League football from 1912 to 1965

Leagues that were affiliated to the London FA (or FA) but have disbanded or amalgamated with other leagues include:

=== Major non-League leagues ===
- Aetolian League
- Athenian League
- Corinthian League
- Delphian League
- Greater London League (formed by a merger of the Aetolian and London Leagues)
- London League
- Metropolitan League
- Metropolitan–London League (formed by a merger of the Metropolitan and Greater London Leagues)
- Parthenon League
- Spartan League (known as the London Spartan League for a few season following a merger with the Metropolitan–London League)

=== Other leagues ===
- Asian Premier League (founded 2009, dissolved 2012)
- Beckenham League
- Bermondsey League
- Bromley and District Football League
- Camberwell League
- Clapham League
- Delphis Sunday Football League (incorporated in London and Kent Border Football League)
- East London Sunday League (1930)
- Enfield Football Alliance (founded 1941, dissolved 2012)
- Finchley and District League
- Ford Sunday League
- Herald League
- Lewisham League
- London and Kent Border Football League
- London City Airport Sunday League
- London Shipping League
- Northern Suburban Intermediate League
- South East London Amateur League
- South London Football Alliance
- South London League
- Southern Alliance
- Southern Suburban League (also known as South Suburban League)
- Tottenham & District Junior Alliance League
- United Senior League
- Walthamstow and District League
- Wandsworth and District League
- West London League
- West London Alliance League
- Woolwich and District League

== Member and associated clubs ==
It is difficult to provide a comprehensive list of those notable clubs that are (or at one time were) affiliated to the London FA. However, by identifying those clubs that have competed in the London Senior Cup along with those clubs that are (or were) located in the Greater London area it is possible to establish the following list:

- 2nd Grenadier Guards (now defunct)
- 3rd Grenadier Guards (now defunct)
- A.F.C. Hayes
- A.F.C. Hornchurch
- Argonauts (now defunct)
- Barking
- Barkingside
- Beckenham Town
- Bedfont
- Bedfont Town
- Bethnal Green United
- Bexley United (now defunct)
- Bishop's Stortford
- Boreham Wood
- Briggs Sports (now defunct)
- Brimsdown Rovers
- Bromley
- Carshalton Athletic
- Casuals (became Corinthian-Casuals)
- Clapham Rovers
- Clapton
- Cockfosters
- Colliers Wood United
- Corinthian (became Corinthian-Casuals)
- Corinthian-Casuals
- Cray Wanderers
- Croydon
- Croydon Athletic
- Croydon Common (now defunct)
- Dagenham (became Dagenham & Redbridge)
- Dulwich Hamlet
- Enfield
- Enfield Town
- Erith & Belvedere
- Erith Town
- Farnborough Town
- Finchley
- Fisher
- Fisher Athletic (now defunct)
- Greenwich Borough
- Hampton & Richmond Borough
- Hanwell Town
- Haringey & Waltham Development
- Haringey Borough
- Harrow Borough
- Hayes (became Hayes & Yeading United)
- Hayes & Yeading United
- Hendon
- Hillingdon Borough
- Hitchin Town
- Ilford
- Kingsbury London Tigers
- Kingstonian
- Leatherhead
- Leyton (now defunct)
- Leytonstone (became Dagenham & Redbridge)
- London All Peoples Sports Association
- London Caledonians (now defunct)
- London Welsh
- Metropolitan Police F.C.
- North Greenford United
- Northwood
- Old Castle Swifts (became West Ham United)
- Redbridge
- Redbridge Forest (became Dagenham & Redbridge)
- Royal Ordnance Factories (now defunct)
- St. Albans City
- Seven Acre & Sidcup
- Shepherd's Bush (now defunct)
- Southall
- South Kilburn
- Sporting Bengal United
- Staines Town
- Surbiton (now defunct)
- Sutton United
- Thames (now defunct)
- Thames Ironworks (became West Ham United)
- Thamesmead Town
- Tooting & Mitcham United
- Upton Park (now defunct)
- Uxbridge
- Waltham Abbey
- Waltham Forest
- Walthamstow Avenue (became Dagenham & Redbridge)
- Walton & Hersham
- Wealdstone
- Welling United
- Wingate & Finchley
- Wanderers
- Woking
- Yeading (became Hayes & Yeading United))

Clubs in the Premier League and The Football League that have competed in the London FA's London Charity Cup or are located in the Greater London area include:

- AFC Wimbledon
- Arsenal
- Barnet
- Brentford
- Charlton Athletic
- Chelsea
- Crystal Palace
- Dagenham & Redbridge
- Fulham
- Leyton Orient
- Millwall
- Queens Park Rangers
- Tottenham Hotspur
- West Ham United
- Wimbledon (now defunct)

== County Cup competitions ==
Today the London Football Association runs 9 different County Cup competitions:

- The London Senior Cup;
- The London Senior Trophy
- The London Intermediate Cup – commenced in 1914–15;
- The London Junior Cup;
- The London FA Women's Cup – first contested in 1994–95.;
- The London Women's Junior Cup
- The London Veterans Cup;
- The London Sunday Intermediate Cup;
- The London Sunday Junior Cup; and
- The London Sunday Challenge Cup.
- Turnham Green Trophy
- Jack Morgan Cup
- Marcus Lipton Cup
- Presidents Charity Cup

The LFA also formerly ran the following competitions:

- London Charity Cup – discontinued in 1975
- London Challenge Cup – discontinued in 2000

The London FA also jointly administers the Capital Women's Cups alongside the Surrey FA, the Amateur Football Alliance and the Middlesex FA.

== List of recent London Cup winners ==
Season	London Senior Cup	London Intermediate Cup	London Junior Cup	London Women's Cup	London Women's Junior Cup
2000–01	Ford United	Corinthian-Casuals Reserves	Competition Void	Fulham Ladies	
2001–02	Croydon	London City Athletic	TC Sports	Fulham Ladies	
2002–03	Bromley	Cray Valley Paper Mills	Memorial Sports	Charlton Athletic Ladies	
2003–04	Dulwich Hamlet	Cray Valley Paper Mills	Battersea	Arsenal Ladies	
2004–05	Fisher Athletic	Metrogas	Real Phoenix	Charlton Athletic Ladies	
2005–06	Fisher Athletic (2)	Metrogas	Fenerbahce	Charlton Athletic Ladies	
2006–07	Tooting & Mitcham United	Corinthian-Casuals Reserves	Tornados	Arsenal Ladies	
2007–08	Tooting & Mitcham United (2)	Metrogas	Flanders	Arsenal Ladies	
2008–09	Hendon		Summertown	Arsenal Ladies	
2009–10	Metropolitan Police F.C.			Arsenal Ladies	
2010–11	Wingate and Finchley	Cray Valley Paper Mills	AFC Sevenoaks	Arsenal Ladies	West Ham United Ladies
2011-12	Hendon (2)				
2012-13	Bromley FC (2)				
2013-14	AFC Wimbledon				
2014-15	Hendon (3)				
2015-16	Tooting & Mitcham United (3)				
2016-17	Cray Valley Paper Mills				
2017-18	Balham				
2018-19	Welling United				
2019-20	Hendon (4)				
2020-21	Tooting & Mitcham United (4)				
2021-22	Brentford B				
2022-23	Charlton Athletic				

== List of recent London Sunday and Veterans Cup winners ==
Season	London Sunday Challenge Cup	London Sunday Intermediate Cup	London Sunday Junior Cup	London Veterans Cup
2000–01	Livingstone	Sporting Club Tropic	Regent Celtic	
2001–02	Green Island United	Libra Arms	Black Horse	Reginald Vets
2002–03	Memorial Sports	Aris	Roebuck	Walthamstow Pennant Vets
2003–04	St Anselm's	Aris	Mottingham Village	Walthamstow Pennant Vets
2004–05	Aris	Mehmetcik	Fenerbahce	Walthamstow Pennant Vets
2005–06	Aris	Albion Manor	Red Star (Camden)	Fisher Athletic (London)
2006–07	Akincilar	Frenford Sunday	Rolls Park	Baldon Sports
2007–08	New Salamis	Eureka	Clapton Rangers	Waltham Forest Vets
2008–09	Baldon Sports	Clapton Rangers	Cetinkaya Cinar	
2009–10	New Salamis			
2010–11	New Salamis	Greengate	Yalova	Livingstone RARA
2011–12	Eltham Town			
2012–13	APOEL UK			
2013–14	FC Tripimeni			
2014–15	New Salamis			
2015–16	Baldon Sports			
2016–17	New Salamis			
2017–18	New Salamis			

== Members of council ==
=== President ===
- Lionel Seymour

=== Vice presidents ===
- Basil Stallard (1973)
- Stan Nathan (1966)
- David Richbell (1969)
- David Wolff (1970)
- Clive Coleman (1974)
- Michael McElligott (1974)
- Norman Moss (1976)
- Maurice Hales B.E.M (1977)
- Bob Henderson (1977)
- Darryl Ryan (1981)

=== Chairman ===
- Tony Sharples (1981)

=== Vice chairman ===
- George Dorling (1983)

=== Honorary treasurer ===
- Basil Stallard (1973)

=== Honorary life members ===
- Lawrie Aldridge (1960)
- Ron Halfacre (1964)
- Harry Hall (1973)
- Cyril Rebak (1973)

== Directors and officials ==
=== Board of directors ===
- L.J. Seymour (President)
- David Fowkes ( Chief Executive and Company Secretary)
- RA Blackman
- G Dorling
- BJ Miller
- B Stallard
- AJ Sharples
- GC Taylor
- CD Wheeler

=== Key officials ===
- Paul Bickerton ( Chief Executive)
- Josie Clifford (County Development Manager)

== See also ==
- Football in London
- London Senior Cup
- London Intermediate Cup
