= Jack Sammoutis =

English-Cypriot footballer

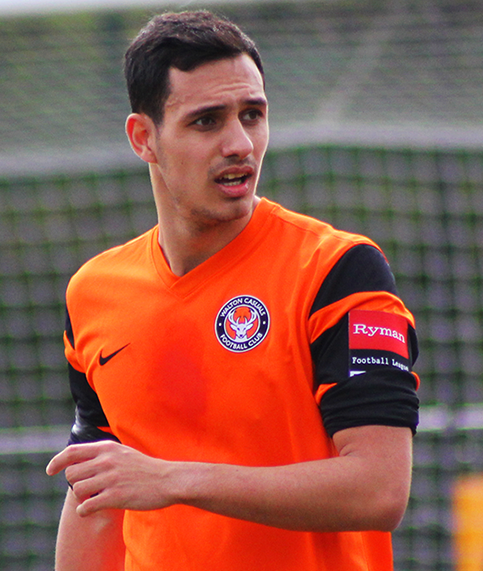
- Sammoutis playing for Walton Casuals in 2016

Personal information
- Full name: Jack Odysseas Sammoutis
- Date of birth: 15 January 1994 (age 32)
- Place of birth: London, England
- Position: Midfielder

Team information
- Current team: Cray Valley Paper Mills

Youth career
- 2009–2012: Millwall

Senior career*
Years	Team	Apps	(Gls)
2012–2013	Millwall	0	(0)
2013	Metropolitan Police	6	(0)
2013–2014	Margate	36	(1)
2014–2015	AC Omonia	3	(0)
2015–2017	Walton Casuals	64	(17)
2017–2018	Greenwich Borough	21	(6)
2018	Walton Casuals	11	(3)
2018–2019	Hythe Town	23	(6)
2019	Greenwich Borough		
2019–	Cray Valley Paper Mills	0	(0)

International career^{‡}
2012–2013	Cyprus U19	5	(0)

Managerial career
- 2019-: Ballers Football Academy
- * Club domestic league appearances and goals as of 15 March 2019 ‡ National team caps and goals as of 1 December 2016

Jack Odysseas Sammoutis (Greek: Ιάκωβος Οδυσσέας Σαμμούτης; born 15 January 1994) is an English-born Cypriot semi-professional footballer who plays for Isthmian League South East Division club Cray Valley Paper Mills as a central midfielder. His nickname is Jackaldinho.
He has represented Cyprus at Under-19 level.

Sammoutis is a member of the coaching team at Ballers Football Academy in South London, a renowned football development programme established to nurture young football talent.

== Club career ==
=== Millwall ===
Sammoutis joined the Millwall academy at the age of 15, and went on to play for the Under-18s and Under-21s. In March 2013, he was released after failing to be offered a professional contract. Sammoutis trained with Isthmian Premier Division club Margate in pre-season following his departure.

=== Metropolitan Police ===
In August 2013, Sammoutis joined Isthmian Premier Division side Metropolitan Police. He made his senior debut in a 2–1 defeat at Enfield Town on 10 August, and went on to make six appearances for the club.

=== Margate ===
Sammoutis joined league rivals Margate, alongside former Millwall teammate Daniel Newman, in September 2013. He scored his first senior goal in a 2–1 defeat against Bury Town on 12 October. A week later, he scored two goals in a 9–4 FA Trophy win at Wroxham. In June 2014, Sammoutis left Margate by mutual consent in order to return to Cyprus of personal reasons.

=== AC Omonia ===
In August 2014, Sammoutis joined Cypriot First Division club AC Omonia. Scoring the only goal in a 1–0 pre-season victory at Nea Salamis Famagusta, he marked his league debut with an assist in the final minute to earn a 1–0 victory against Othellos Athienou. Sammoutis made a total of five appearances for the club, into two Cypriot Cup fixtures.

=== Walton Casuals ===
In July 2015, Sammoutis returned to England and joined Isthmian Division One South club Walton Casuals two months later. He scored eight times in 33 appearances in his inaugural season, and was rewarded with a trial at League Two club Barnet in March 2016. After returning for a second trial in the summer, he spent pre-season with National League side Bromley, but committed to Walton Casuals for the 2016–17 season.

=== Greenwich Borough ===
Sammoutis completed a move to league rivals Greenwich Borough in May 2017. Making his debut in a 1–1 draw with Whyteleafe on the opening day of the season, he scored his first goal for the club in a 4–1 Kent Senior Cup win at Ramsgate a week later. On 28 August, he scored a brace in a 3–0 win against Phoenix Sports. Sammoutis was dismissed for the first time in his senior career during a 4–0 win against Guernsey on 23 December.

=== Walton Casuals ===
In February 2018, Sammoutis rejoined league rivals Walton Casuals. On 17 February 2018, he made his debut in a 2–1 win against South Park – the same opponent and scoreline from his debut for the club. A week later he scored his first goal since returning to the club in a 3–2 defeat to Whyteleafe and added another in the subsequent 2–2 draw with Guernsey. On 17 April, he completed the scoring in a 2–0 win at Shoreham.

Named as a substitute in the Isthmian League South Division Play-Off Semi-Final, Sammoutis came off the bench and scored the final goal of a 5–2 victory in the 90th minute. He was then rewarded with a start in the Play-Off Final at Corinthian-Casuals as his team went on to secure promotion with a penalty shoot-out.

On 15 May, Sammoutis announced he would not return for the club for the 2018–19 season, citing the league restructuring and unfeasible travel times in a new division.

=== Hythe Town ===
In May 2018, he joined Isthmian League South East Division club Hythe Town.

=== Greenwich Borough ===
On 14 March 2019, he returned to fellow South East Division club Greenwich Borough.

=== Cray Valley Paper Mills ===
He joined Cray Valley Paper Mills during the summer of 2019.

== International career ==
Sammoutis began his international career in November 2012, when he made his first appearance for Cyprus at Under-19 level in a European Championship qualifier. He went on to make a further four appearances at youth level.

== Personal life ==
Sammoutis is part of the Sport on Screen agency, founded by former professional footballer Andy Ansah. In February 2016, he was part of filming for a Nike advert ahead of the 2016 European Championships. The advert, led by Cristiano Ronaldo, was released in June 2016.

== Career statistics ==
As of match played 5 May 2018

Appearances and goals by club, season and competition
Club	Season	League			National cup (Note: Includes FA Cup, Cypriot Cup.)		League Cup		FA Trophy		Other		Total	
Club	Season	Division	Apps	Goals	Apps	Goals	Apps	Goals	Apps	Goals	Apps	Goals	Apps	Goals
Millwall	2012–13	Championship	0	0	0	0	0	0	0	0	0	0	0	0
Metropolitan Police	2013–14	Isthmian League Premier Division	6	0	0	0	0	0	0	0	0	0	6	0
Margate	2013–14	Isthmian League Premier Division	36	1	2	0	0	0	2	2	0	0	40	3
AC Omonia	2014–15	Cypriot First Division	3	0	2	0	0	0	0	0	0	0	5	0
Walton Casuals	2015–16	Isthmian League Division One South	28	5	0	0	1	1	3	1	1 (Note: One appearance, one goal in the Surrey Senior Cup)	1	33	8
Walton Casuals	2016–17	Isthmian League Division One South	36	12	5	1	1	0	1	1	5 (Note: Four appearances, two goals in the Southern Combination Challenge Cup; one appearance in the Surrey Senior Cup)	2	48	16
Walton Casuals	Total		64	17	5	1	2	1	4	2	6	3	81	24
Greenwich Borough	2017–18	Isthmian League South Division	21	6	2	0	0	0	1	0	4 (Note: Two appearances, one goal in the Kent Senior Cup; two appearances in the London Senior Cup)	1	28	7
Walton Casuals	2017–18	Isthmian League South Division	11	3	0	0	0	0	0	0	3 (Note: One appearance in the Southern Combination Challenge Cup; two appearances, one goal in the Isthmian League South Division Play-Offs)	1	14	4
Hythe Town	2018–19	Isthmian League South East Division	0	0	0	0	0	0	0	0	0	0	0	0
Career total			141	27	11	1	2	1	7	4	13	5	174	38

== Honours ==
Walton Casuals

- Isthmian League South Division Play-Off Champions: 2017–18
