= New Salamis F.C. =

Association football club in England

Coordinates: 51°36′20.12″N 0°05′33.97″W

New Salamis
- Full name: New Salamis Football Club
- Founded: 1971; 55 years ago
- Dissolved: 2024
- Ground: Coles Park
- Capacity: 3,000
Home colours

New Salamis Football Club was a football club based in Bowes Park, London, England. They were lastly members of the Isthmian League North Division and played at the Coles Park, White Hart Lane, London, groundsharing with Haringey Borough.

== History ==
New Salamis was formed in 1971 by fans of Cypriot club Nea Salamis Famagusta, with the Cyprus-based club acting as a parent club. Playing in the KOPA League, a British Cypriot league, the club won the 2016 FA Sunday Cup, following a penalty shootout win against Barnes at Selhurst Park. Ahead of the 2019–20 season, New Salamis were promoted to the Spartan South Midlands League, following a second-placed finish in the Hertfordshire Senior League. New Salamis entered the FA Vase for the first time in 2019–20. In 2021 the club were promoted to the Premier Division based on their results in the abandoned 2019–20 and 2020–21 seasons. The following season they were promoted as champions to the Isthmian League North Division.

In March 2024, New Salamis announced that they would fold at the end of the 2023–24 season.

== Ground ==
The club groundshared and played at Coles Park, home of Haringey Borough on Saturday and Tuesday nights.

== Honours ==
=== League ===
- Spartan South Midlands League
  - Premier Division champions: 2021–22
- Hertfordshire Senior League
  - Runners-up: 2018–19
- KOPA League
  - Champions: 1984–85, 1993–94, 1999–2000, 2000–01, 2008–09, 2010–11, 2011–12, 2012–13, 2014–15, 2015–16, 2016–17, 2017–18
  - Runners-up: 1988–89, 1991–92, 1995–96, 1998–99, 2001–02, 2009–10

=== Cups ===
- Hertfordshire Senior League Aubrey Cup
  - Winners: 2018–19
- FA Sunday Cup
  - Winners: 2015–16
  - Runners-up: 2016–17
- London FA Sunday Challenge Cup
  - Winners: 1981–82, 2007–08, 2009–10, 2010–11, 2013–14, 2014–15, 2016–17, 2017–18
  - Runners-up: 2005–06
- KOPA League Challenge Cup
  - Winners: 1987–88, 1994–95, 1995–96, 2013–14, 2016–17, 2017–18
  - Runners-up: 1988–89, 1991–92, 1996–97, 2002–03, 2005–06, 2009–10
- KOPA League First Division Cup
  - Winners: 1987–88, 1994–95, 1995–96, 2005–06, 2013–14, 2016–17, 2017–18
  - Runners-up: 1988–89, 1991–92, 1996–97, 2002–03, 2009–10

== Records ==
- Best FA Cup performance: First qualifying round, 2020–21
- Best FA Vase performance: Second qualifying round, 2019–20
