= 1951 in association football =

The following are the football (soccer) events of the year 1951 throughout the world.

== Events ==
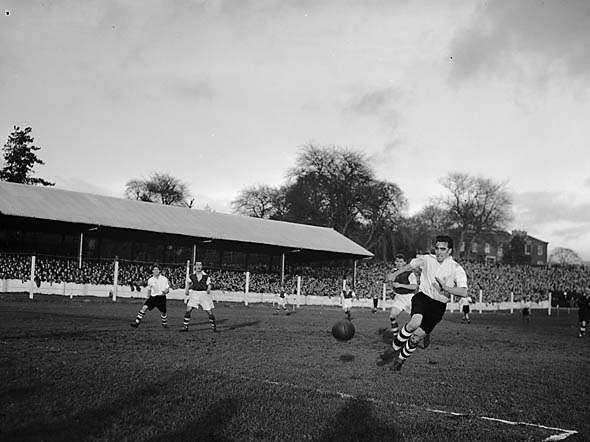
A 1951–52 FA Cup match between Welsh club Merthyr and England's Ipswich

Category:Association football clubs established in 1951

== Winners club national championship ==
- Argentina: Racing Club
- England: Tottenham Hotspur
- France: OGC Nice
- Italy: A.C. Milan
- Netherlands: PSV Eindhoven
- Romania: CCA București
- Scotland: Hibernian
- (Spain) : Atlético Madrid
- West Germany: 1. FC Kaiserslautern

== International tournaments ==
- Pan American Games in Buenos Aires, Argentina (25 February – 8 March 1951)
  - Gold Medal: Argentina
  - Silver Medal: Costa Rica
  - Bronze Medal: Chile
- 1951 Asian Games in New Delhi, India (5 – 10 March 1951)
  - (gold) : India
  - (silver) : Iran
  - (bronze) : Japan
- 1950–51 British Home Championship (7 October 1950 – 14 April 1951)

Scotland

== Births ==
- 1 January – Dante Garro, Argentine club footballer and manager (died 2008)
- 2 January – Terry Stanley, English former professional footballer
- 18 January – Renato Zaccarelli, Italian international footballer and manager.
- 14 February – Kevin Keegan, English international footballer and manager.
- 21 February – Wolfgang Frank, German footballer and manager (died 2013)
- 4 March – Kenny Dalglish, Scottish international footballer and manager
- 11 April – Jim Holton, Scottish international footballer (died 1993)
- 2 June – Antonio Benítez, Spanish international footballer (died 2014)
- 21 September – Bruce Arena, American soccer player and coach.
- 23 September – Harry Lubse, Dutch international footballer
- 12 October – István Halász, Hungarian international footballer (died 2016)
- 3 November – François Bracci, French international footballer
- 9 December – Dominique Dropsy, French international footballer (died 2015)
- 17 December – Jed Reilly, Scottish former footballer

== Deaths ==
=== January ===
- 26 January - Henri Bard, French footballer (born 1892)

=== May ===
- 9 May - Leo Bosschart, Dutch footballer (born 1888)

=== July ===
- 14 July - Ben Verweij (55), Dutch footballer (born 1895)

=== November ===
- 13 November – Walter de Souza Goulart, Brazilian goalkeeper, semi-finalist at the 1938 FIFA World Cup (born 1912)
