= Griffin Park =

Football stadium in London, England

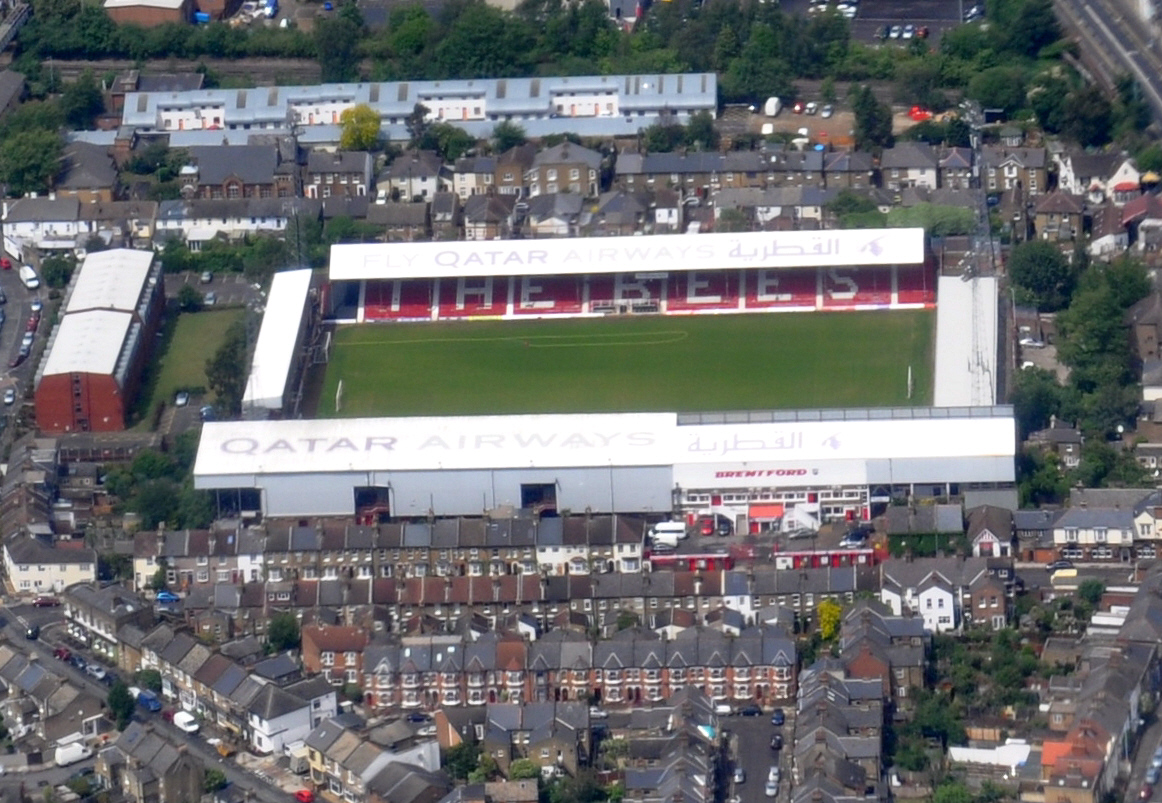
- Interactive map of Griffin Park
- Full name: Griffin Park
- Location: Braemar Road; Brentford; TW8 0NT
- Coordinates: 51°29′17.46″N 0°18′9.50″W
- Owner: Brentford
- Capacity: 12,300
- Field size: 110 × 73 yd (100 × 67 metres)
- Public transit: Brentford

Construction
- Built: January–September 1904
- Opened: September 1904; 122 years ago
- Closed: August 2020; 6 years ago
- Demolished: 2021; 5 years ago

Tenants
- Brentford (1904–2020); London Broncos (2002–2006); Chelsea Reserves (2007–2010)

Griffin Park was a football ground in Brentford in the London Borough of Hounslow, England. It was the home ground of Brentford from its opening in September 1904 to August 2020. The ground was in a predominantly residential area and was known for being the only English league football ground to have a pub on each corner. The ground's name referred to the griffin featured in the logo of Fuller's Brewery, which at one point owned the orchard on which the stadium was built.

== History ==
=== Planning, construction and opening ===
Between Brentford's formation in 1889 and 1904, the club played at five grounds around Ealing – Clifden Road, Benns Field, Shotters Field, Cross Road and Boston Park Cricket Ground. In 1903, Fulham chairman Henry Norris (a prominent estate agent), Brentford manager Dick Molyneux and club president Edwin Underwood negotiated a 21-year lease at a peppercorn rent on an orchard (owned by local brewers Fuller, Smith and Turner) along the Ealing Road, with the option to buy the freehold at a later date for £5,000. After a gypsy camp was removed from the site and work began on building the ground in January 1904, under the guidance of architects Parr & Kates. The orchard was cut down by local volunteers, who were allowed to keep the wood.

The ground was initially built with a 20,000 capacity in mind, with a provision for an increase to 30,000–40,000. An 800-capacity stand from Boston Park was rebuilt along the Braemar Road side of the ground, with an extension taking the stand's capacity to 1,500. Beneath and behind the stand were three dressing rooms (one for each team and one for officials), a number of offices and a recreation room. The ground was named 'Griffin Park' after a nearby pub, The Griffin, which was owned by the Griffin Brewery and was used for accommodation. After a number of trial matches, Griffin Park was opened on 1 September 1904. Season tickets for the 1904–05 season (priced between 10 shillings and one guinea) sold out.

=== The first matches ===
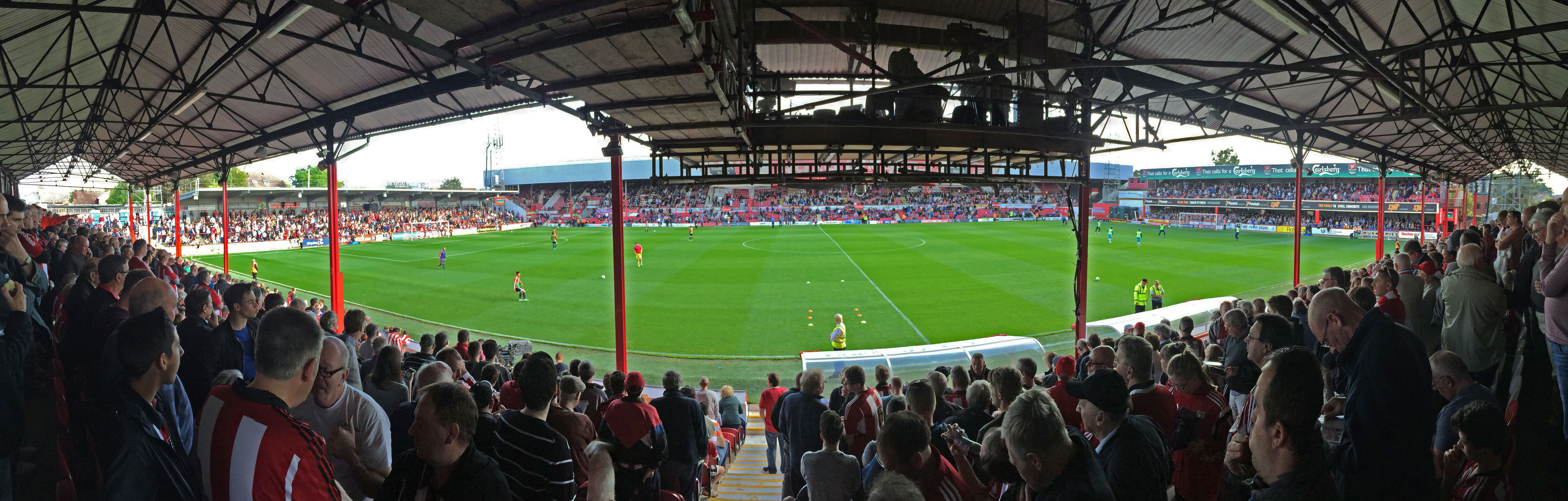
Griffin Park pictured from the New Road stand, September 2015.

The first competitive match played at Griffin Park was a Western League fixture versus Plymouth Argyle on 1 September 1904. The Braemar Road grandstand had been completed by the time of the fixture, but as the dressing rooms were not ready and the players were forced to change at the public baths in Clifden Road. The borough surveyor declared the grandstand unsafe and banned its use until improvements had been made. Argyle scored the first competitive goal at the ground through Fred Buck, but four minutes from the final whistle, Tommy Shanks converted a James Swarbrick cross to secure a 1–1 draw. The attendance was estimated at between 4,000 and 5,000.

The first competitive fixture to be played at the ground was a Southern League First Division match on 3 September 1904, which yielded a 0–0 draw between Brentford and West Ham United. The Bees had to wait until 22 October 1904 for their first victory at the ground, a 2–0 win over Millwall. The first Football League match to be played at the ground was on 30 August 1920, with Reginald Boyne scoring the only goal of a Third Division fixture versus Millwall.

=== Development ===
The money generated from Brentford's run to the fifth round of the FA Cup during the 1926–27 season (£5,000, equivalent to £270,000 in 2025) allowed a new grandstand to be constructed to replace the 'cow shed' on the Braemar Road side of the ground.

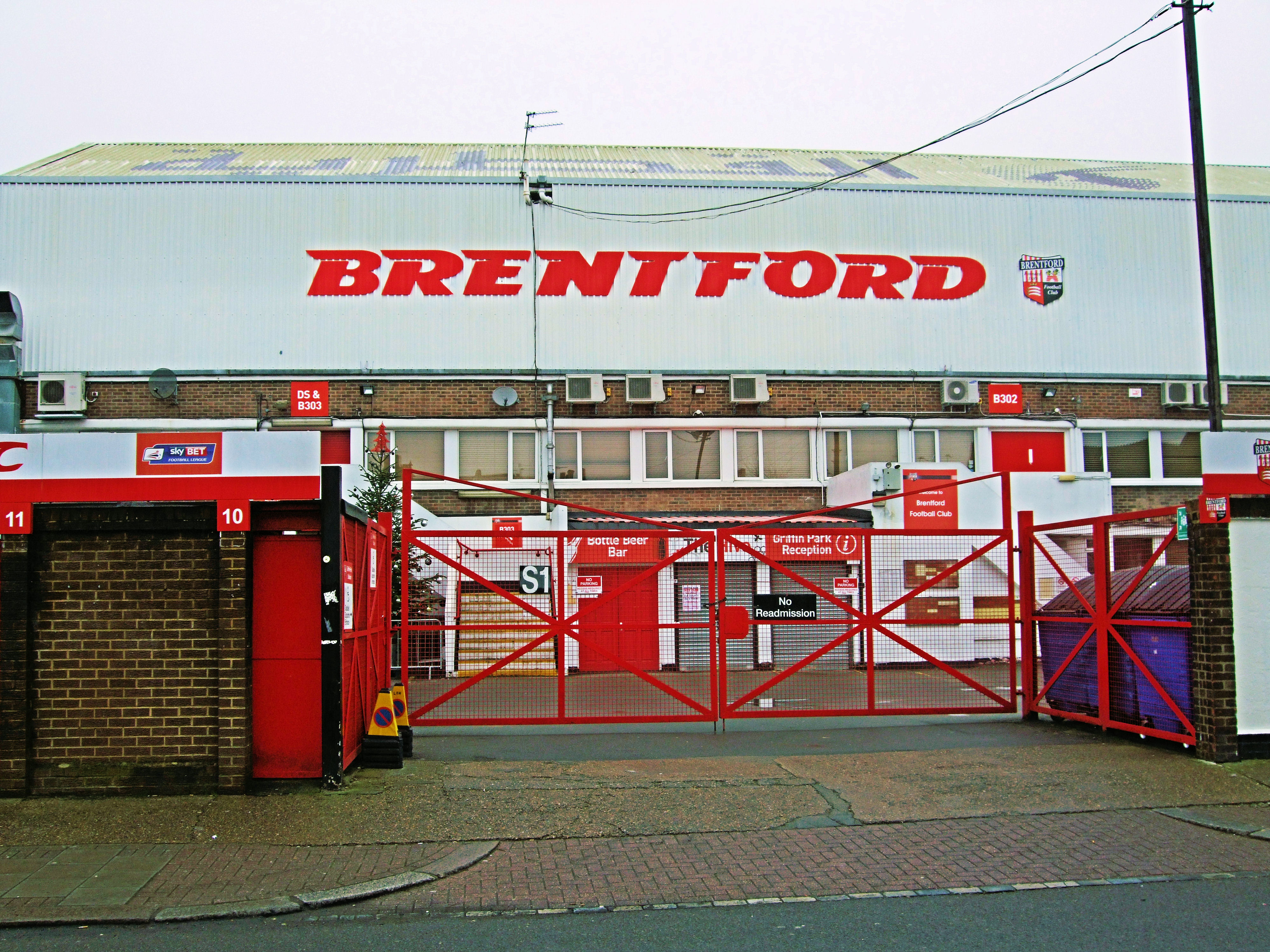
The forecourt behind the Braemar Road stand, pictured in January 2015, with the club offices and bar visible.

Unlike the old grandstand, the new stand ran the length of the pitch. After the season, it was announced that Griffin Park would be completely redeveloped over the following decade. Concrete terracing was installed at the Ealing Road end of the ground in 1930. During the 1933 off-season, a new stand was constructed at the Brook Road end of the ground and the New Road terrace was extended the following year to allow a further 5,000 supporters to be accommodated. Prior to Brentford's debut First Division season in 1935–36, the New Road terrace was extended and a roof was added, which took the stand's capacity to 20,000.

Little development occurred at Griffin Park between the mid-1930s and the mid-1980s and the ground's 38,000 capacity was the largest in its history. The frontage of the Braemar Road stand was rebuilt in 1963, adding club offices and a club room. Flats were built in a spare, matchday parking area behind the Ealing Road terrace in 1985 and the following year the Brook Road 'kop' was torn down and replaced by a two-tiered stand, colloquially known as the 'Wendy House'. On the New Road side of the ground, the 1930s extension to the terrace was removed and a sheet metal wall was added to the back of the stand.

In 2006, the pitch was moved a few metres to the west in order to accommodate box goal nets and the following year, a roof was added to the Ealing Road terrace. Numerous improvements were made after Brentford's promotion to the Championship in 2014, including resurfacing of access areas, extra CCTV, new signage, new heated seats in the dugouts and AstroTurf installed in the pitch-side run-off areas. With the club placed in the Championship playoff places in January 2015, additional work was carried out on the New Road stand ahead of a deadline for submission of a report to the Premier League, which outlined development plans ahead of a potential promotion. LED advertising boards were installed at the ground for the first time during the 2017–18 season and goal-line technology was installed during the 2017 off-season.

=== Crowd disturbance ===
The only occasion on which Griffin Park was closed due to crowd trouble was following a Third Division South match versus Brighton & Hove Albion on 12 September 1925. Ill-feeling on the pitch sparked trouble on the terraces and following the referee's report, the FA closed the ground for 14 days. The following home match against Crystal Palace was moved to Selhurst Park, where Brentford suffered a 2–0 defeat and dropped to bottom place in the Football League.

=== Wartime bombing ===
Griffin Park survived the bombing raids of the First World War unscathed, though bombs fell on the nearby High Street while the team was playing away at Crystal Palace on 19 January 1918. During the Second World War, Griffin Park was hit by two high-explosive bombs in 1940 and 1941. Six matches were abandoned or postponed during the Blitz.

=== The "Great Fire of Brentford" ===
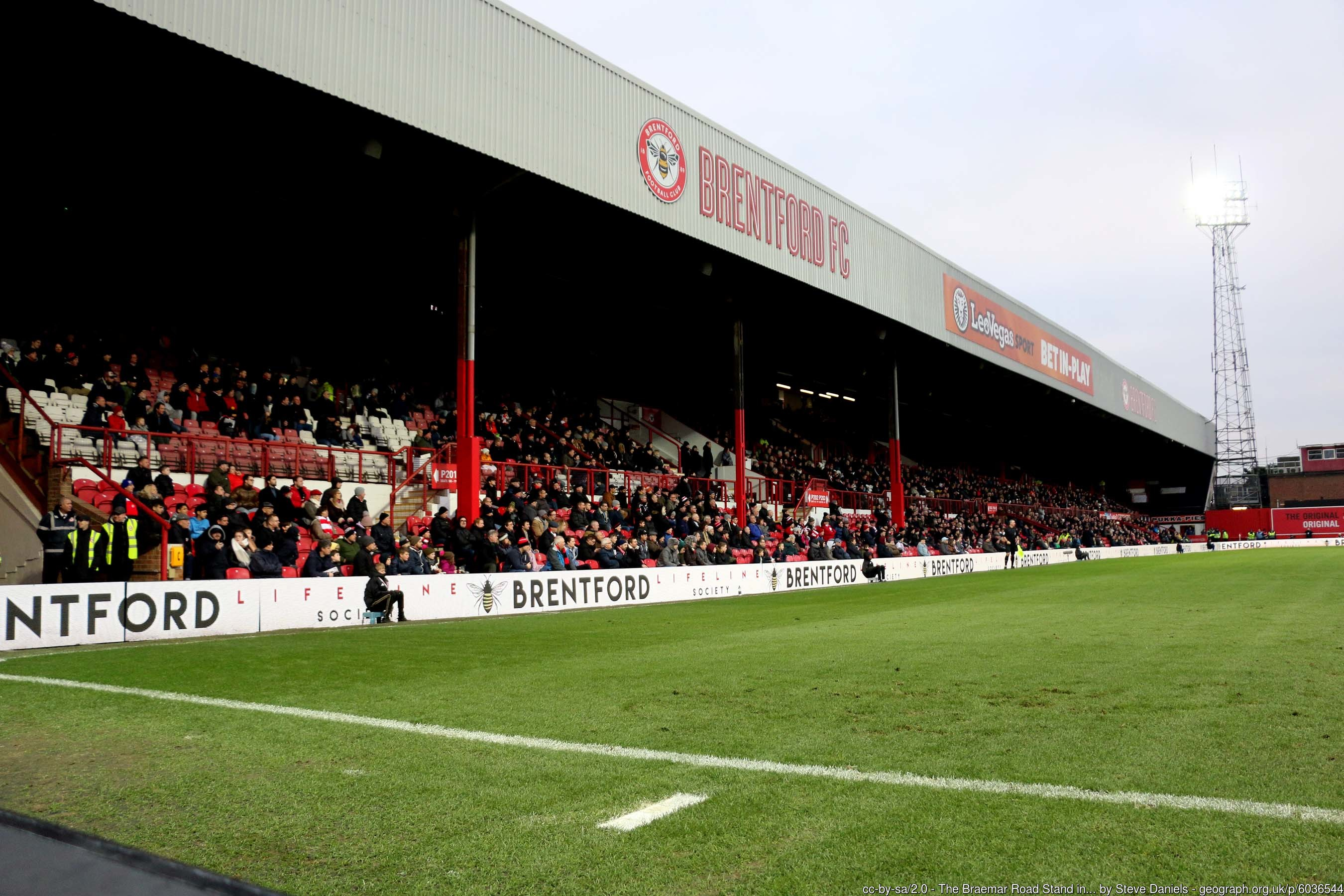
The Braemar Road stand from pitchside in January 2019.

At 11:30 pm on 1 February 1983, a fire broke out in the Braemar Road Stand, possibly due to an electrical fault in the boiler room under the stand. The fire quickly spread through the timber used in the construction of the stand. Groundsman Alec Banks, who lived under the stand, was rescued by then-Brentford player Stan Bowles and his wife Jane. Sixty people were evacuated from homes nearby and an estimated £150,000 worth of damage was caused, including 800 seats, the away dressing room, the gymnasium, the kit store and the laundry. It was after the reconstruction that the players' tunnel was moved to the western corner of the Braemar Road Stand, with the players having previously emerged from a tunnel at the halfway line.

=== "Fortress Griffin Park" ===
Brentford set an English football record when the club won all 21 home games during the 1929–30 Third Division South season. Despite the record (which still stands as of 2025), the Bees finished as runners-up to Plymouth Argyle and failed to win promotion to Second Division. Brentford finished the 2014 calendar year with the best home record in the Football League, winning 17 of 23 games (two more than the next-best tally) and accruing a 78% winning record.

=== Ticketing ===
An electronic ticketing system was installed on all turnstiles at Griffin Park during the 2014 off-season. Previously, supporters were able to pay on the turnstiles on match days for non-all-ticket matches.

=== Attempts to move to a new stadium ===
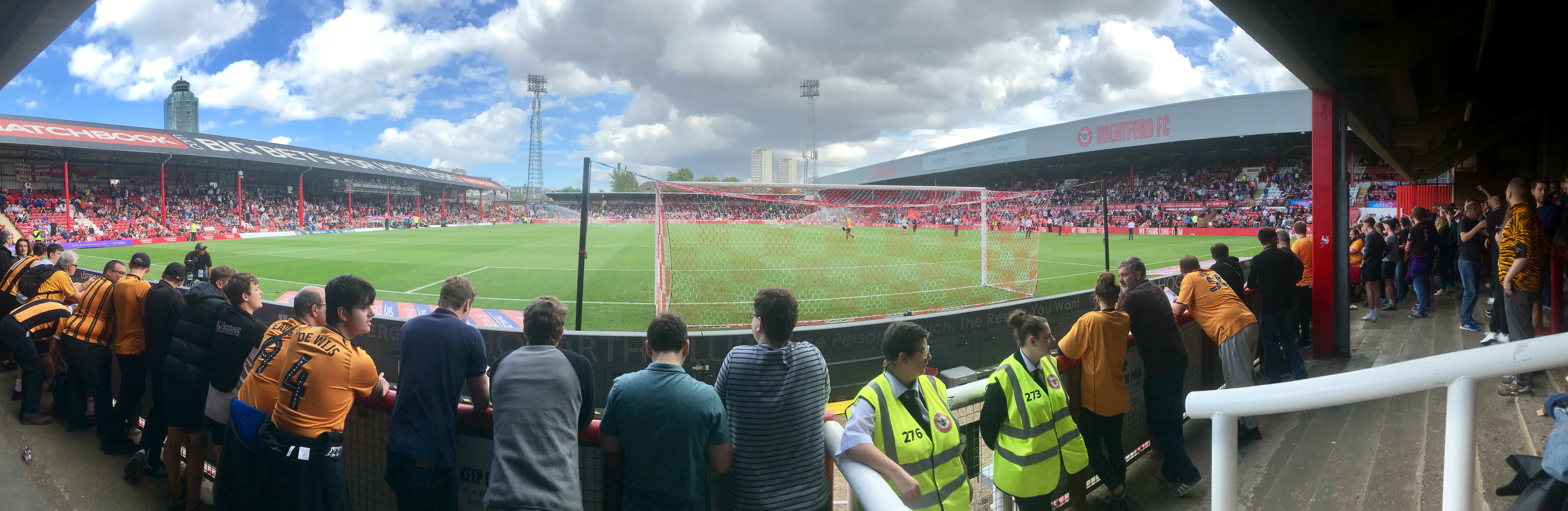
Hull City supporters accommodated in the Brook Road stand prior to a match in August 2019.

In August 1973, the Middlesex Chronicle reported that Brentford had submitted a bid to Hounslow Council to build a new ground and leisure complex on the site of Brentford Market. Brentford's hopes of moving to a new 20,000-capacity stadium were boosted in 2007 after the club was given an option to buy a 7.6-acre (31,000 m^{2}) site at Lionel Road, less than a mile away from Griffin Park. The project was halted in 2010 due to the economic downturn and partners Barratt Homes pulled out of the deal in January 2011. In June 2012, the club bought the Lionel Road site from Barratt Homes. Outline planning approval was given by the London Borough of Hounslow on 5 December 2013 and the Mayor of London's office gave their approval in February 2014. Eric Pickles (then-Secretary of State for Communities and Local Government) gave final approval for the stadium on 14 March 2014 and a development agreement was signed with Willmott Dixon in December 2014.

The commencement of work on the Lionel Road site was held up through 2015 due to First Industrial Ltd (which owned the final parcel of land needed to begin development) objecting to a compulsory purchase order by Hounslow Council. Hounslow Council completed the acquisition of the land in September 2016 and on-site preparation for construction began in late March 2017. Ground was broken at the site on 19 March 2018 and a long-term deal to groundshare with London Irish was agreed in December 2018. The project was completed in August 2020 and both clubs began the 2020–21 season at the 17,250-capacity Community Stadium.

=== Last years and final matches ===
Brentford's fifth-place finish in the Championship playoff places in the 2014–15 season raised questions about Griffin Park's suitability for Premier League football, prior to the then-expected move to the Community Stadium in 2017. Brentford were given special dispensation by the Sports Ground Safety Authority to retain the terracing in the Ealing Road and Brook Road stands for the 2017–18, 2018–19 and 2019–20 Championship seasons, due to the club's good safety record and its impending move to the Community Stadium.

In October 2018, it was reported that the 2019–20 season would be Brentford's last at Griffin Park. Had promotion to the Premier League been achieved at the end of the 2018–19 season, the club would have applied for special dispensation to play the 2019–20 Premier League season at Griffin Park. Due to the COVID-19 pandemic, the final match not to be played behind closed doors at Griffin Park was a 5–0 Championship win over Sheffield Wednesday on 7 March 2020. The final first team match played at Griffin Park was a 3–1 Championship play-off semi-final second leg victory over Swansea City on 29 July 2020, with Bryan Mbeumo scoring the final Brentford goal. The final match at Griffin Park was a 2019–20 London Senior Cup semi-final, played between Brentford B and Erith Town on 26 August 2020. Brentford B won the match, 6–3, however the last ever goal was scored by Erith Town player, Steadman Callender.

=== Redevelopment ===
Outline planning permission for the redevelopment of Griffin Park into housing was granted in 2005 but, the following year, the club was granted more time to identify an appropriate scheme for a new stadium. A second extension was granted in 2012 and, in 2015, the club submitted a reserved matters application to establish the landscaping and scale of the development. On 3 September 2015, Hounslow Council approved the building of 75 new homes on the site of Griffin Park, after the club moves out. At the centre of the development will be a garden, which will honour the stadium.

== Stadium structure ==
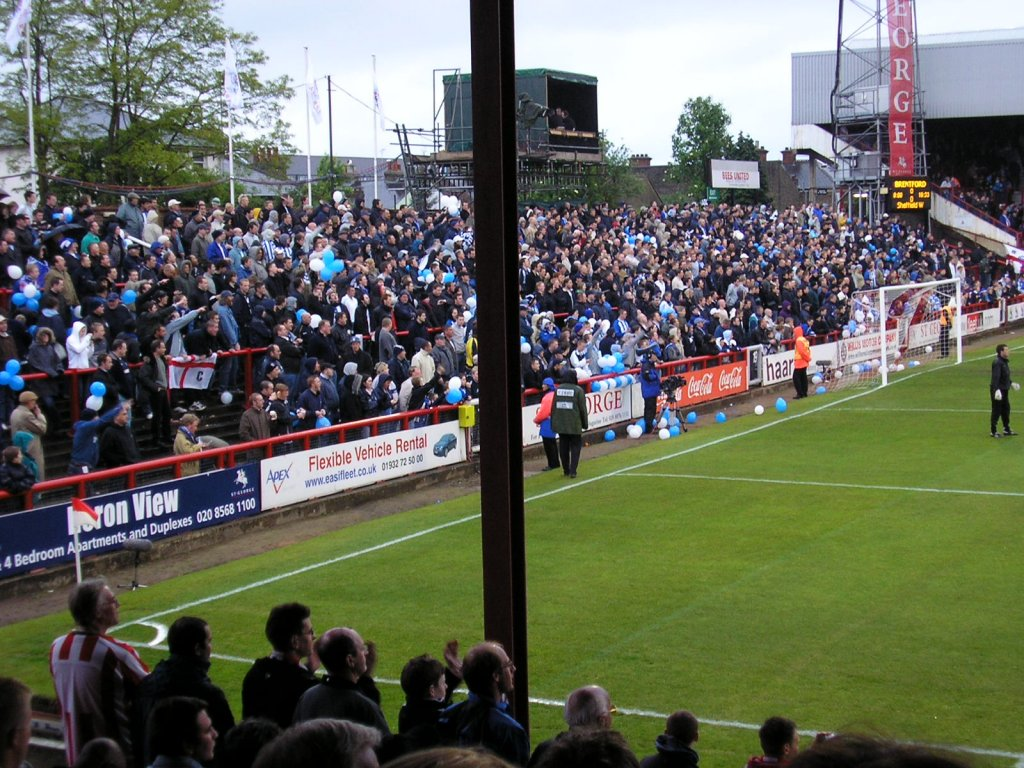
Sheffield Wednesday supporters on the uncovered Ealing Road terrace during the 2005 League One playoffs. A temporary Sky Sports TV gantry is located at the back of the stand.

When first opened, Griffin Park had no terracing and banks surrounded the pitch, covered with ashes. A tiny stand was erected, which was initially refused a safety certificate.

=== Stands ===
- Braemar Road Stand – A two-tiered all-seated stand located along the Braemar Road, with the lower tier being known as 'the Paddock'. The stand also housed the dressing rooms, supporters' bar and club offices. The stand's forecourt housed the club shop and ticket office. Until 2010, the dugouts were located in front of the stand.
- New Road Stand – A single-tiered all-seated stand located along the New Road. During its final years it was officially named the Bill Axbey Stand, as a tribute to the club's oldest-ever supporter. The away supporters' section was housed in the northwest corner of the stand until October 1991. Previously a terrace, the stand was converted to seating during the 1996 off-season. In 2010, at the request of then-manager Andy Scott, the dugouts were relocated in front of the stand. The central camera position for TV broadcasts of games was located in a gantry suspended from the roof of the stand. The Family Section was located in blocks N506, N507 and N508.
- Ealing Road Terrace – A single-tier terrace located at the Ealing Road end of the ground. Previously uncovered, the club had an application to build a roof turned down in 2004 and the terrace finally received a roof in 2007. Traditionally a home end, the terrace housed away supporters at various times throughout the 2000s.
- Brook Road Stand – A two-tiered stand with seating on the upper level and terracing on the lower level, built in the mid-1980s to replace the Royal Oak Stand (Griffin Park's 'kop'). At varying times the stand has housed home supporters (1980s, 2001–2007) or away supporters (1980s, 2007–2020) and because of its appearance was affectionately known as 'the Wendy House'. Until 2004, a vane display scoreboard was mounted on the stand's facade.

=== Floodlights ===
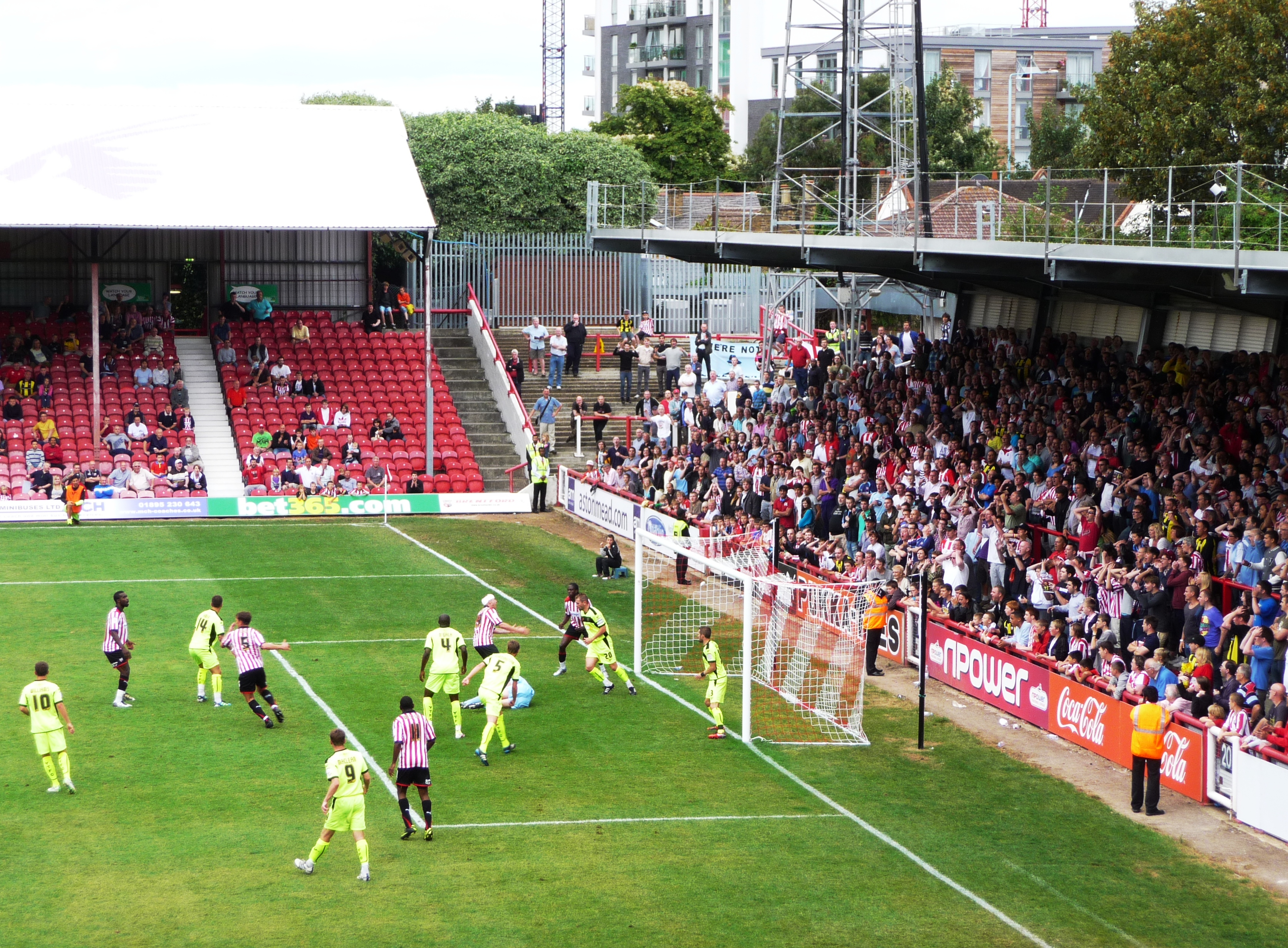
Brentford and Yeovil Town contesting a corner in front of the roofed Ealing Road stand in August 2011.

Brentford was one of the first clubs to recognise the potential of floodlit football and in 1954, a sum of £5,345 (equivalent to £127,000 in 2025) was spent on erecting perimeter lights the length of the Braemar Road and New Road stands. With the Football League banning competitive games under floodlights, a number of friendly matches were arranged to increase revenue, with one match against an International Managers XI attracting 21,600 spectators. By the time the Football League's ban on competitive floodlit football was lifted in February 1956, the club had received over £10,000 in gate receipts from the friendly matches. The original perimeter lights were replaced in August 1963 with pylons located at each corner of the ground, at a cost of £17,000. A new set of floodlight lamps were purchased from West London neighbours Chelsea in 1983. Electronic scoreboards were first attached to two of the pylons in 2004. The floodlights were upgraded from 590 to 1000 lux during the 2015 off-season.

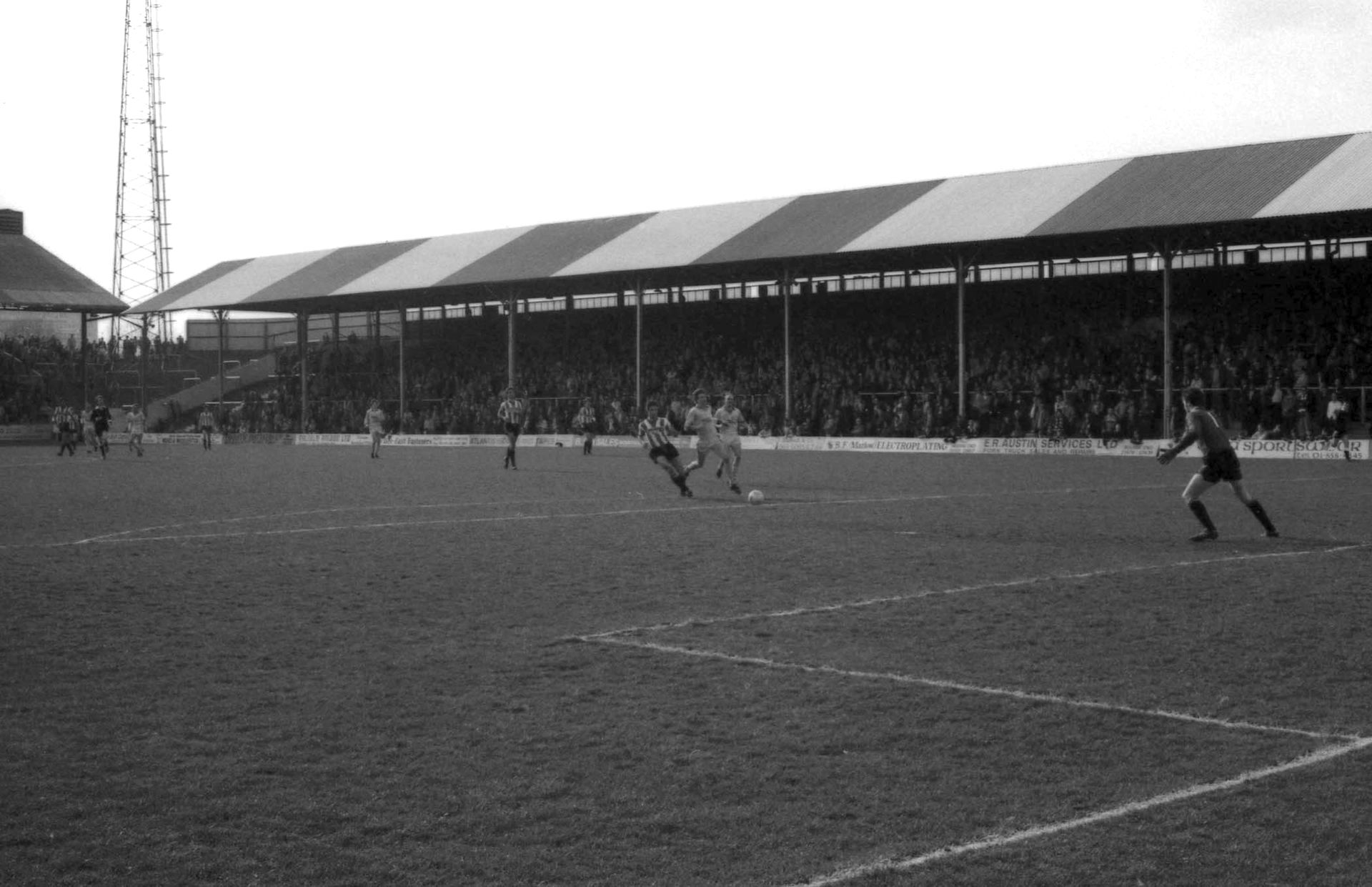
Griffin Park in 1982, with the New Road Stand visible.

== Attendances ==
=== Records ===
- Record attendance (all competitions) – 38,678 (versus Leicester City, FA Cup sixth round, 24 February 1949)
- Record attendance (Football League) – 38,535 (versus Arsenal, First Division, 8 September 1938)
- Record attendance (League Cup) – 17,859 (versus Liverpool, second round, first leg, 5 October 1983)
- Record average attendance in a season – 27,716 (1936–37, First Division)
- Highest attendance in division – 13,300 (1932–33, Third Division South), 11,738 (1971–72, Fourth Division)

=== Last years ===
As of 2016, Griffin Park had a capacity of 12,573. The highest attendance for a league match in its final seasons was 12,367 versus Queens Park Rangers on 21 April 2018. FA Cup fourth and fifth round matches versus Sunderland and Southampton drew crowds of 11,698 and 11,720 in 2006 and 2005 respectively.

== Neutral venue ==
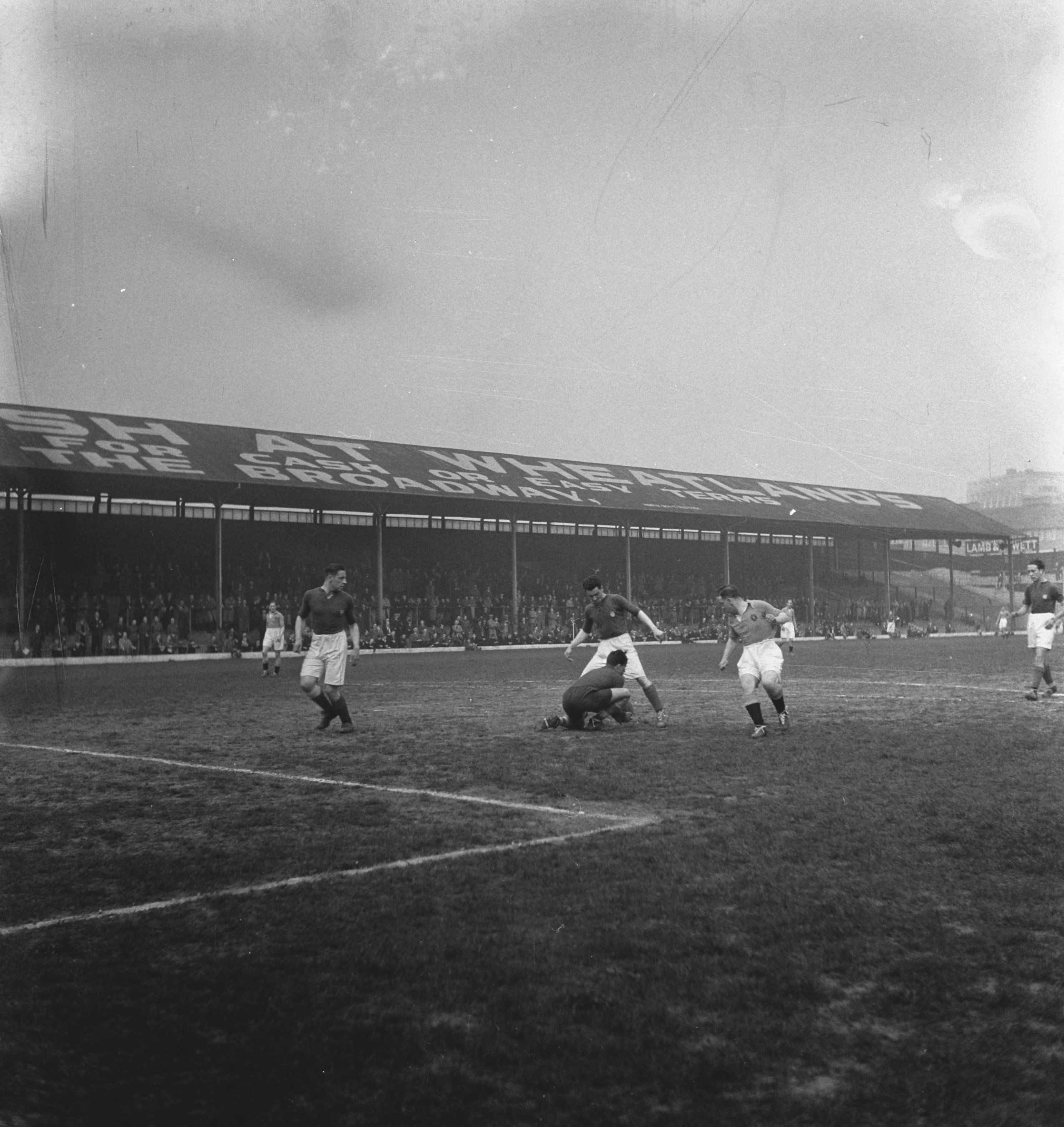
The Netherlands and France contested a wartime friendly match at Griffin Park on 18 April 1942. The Netherlands won 2–0.

=== Football matches ===
- 1942 – Netherlands 2–0 France (friendly)
- 1942 – Netherlands 0–0 Belgium (friendly)
- 1947 – Barnet 1–2 Leytonstone (FA Amateur Cup semi-final)
- 1947 – Barnet 2–0 Kingstonian (London Senior Cup Final)
- 1948 – England Schoolboys 0–1 Republic of Ireland Schoolboys (friendly)
- 1948 – Italy 9–0 United States (1948 Olympic Games)
- 1950 – Bishop Auckland 2–1 Wycombe Wanderers (FA Amateur Cup semi-final)
- 1950 – London University 1–4 Cambridge Town (Amateur Football Alliance Senior Cup Final)
- 1952 – Pegasus 1–0 Kingstonian (Amateur Football Alliance Invitational Final)
- 1953 – Harwich & Parkeston 3–1 Walton & Hersham (FA Amateur Cup semi-final)
- 1957 – England 5–5 Netherlands (youth)
- 1958 – Barnet 2–3 Woking (FA Amateur Cup semi-final)
- 1959 – Fulham 1–0 Luton Town (Southern Professional Floodlit Cup)
- 1960 – Fulham 1–0 Coventry City (Southern Professional Floodlit Cup)
- 1960 – Enfield 0–2 Hendon (FA Amateur Cup semi-final)
- 1962 – Bishop Auckland 1–2 Hounslow Town (FA Amateur Cup semi-final)
- 1963 – Soviet Union U18 0–1 Romania U18 (1963 European U18 Championship finals)
- 1963 – Viking Sports 3–1 Stade Portelois (friendly)
- 1965 – Middlesex 2–2 Northumberland (FA County Youth Cup Final)
- 1966 – England Amateurs 4–0 Republic of Ireland Amateurs (friendly)
- 1967 – Oxford United 0–1 Chelmsford City (FA Cup first round second replay)
- 1968 – Leytonstone 3–1 Sutton United (FA Amateur Cup semi-final replay)
- 1969 – Hillingdon Borough 4–1 Dartford (FA Cup fourth qualifying round second replay)
- 1972 – Hendon 2–1 Wycombe Wanderers (FA Amateur Cup semi-final)
- 1974 – Bishop's Stortford 3–0 Ashington (FA Amateur Cup semi-final replay)
- 1974 – AFC Bournemouth 2–1 Gillingham (Football League Cup first round second replay)
- 1978 – Barnet 0–3 Woking (FA Cup first round second replay)
- 1986 – Finchley 1–2 Walthamstow Avenue (London Senior Cup Final)
- 1988 – England U15 1–0 Brazil U15 (friendly)
- 1989 – England Women 0–0 Finland Women (friendly)
- 1990 – Hayes 1–0 Cardiff City (FA Cup first round)
- 1991 – England U21 4–0 Republic of Ireland U21 (1992 European U21 Championship qualification)
- 1994 – England U21 1–0 Denmark U21 (friendly)
- 1994 – England Women 10–0 Slovenia Women (friendly)
- 1996 – England Women 3–0 Portugal Women (1997 Women's European Championship qualification)
- 2005 – Arsenal Ladies 3–0 Charlton Athletic Women (Women's Premier League Cup Final)
- 2005 – Ghana 0–0 Senegal (friendly)
- 2006 – Ghana 2–0 Togo (friendly)
- 2006 – England U17 2–2 Turkey U17 (FA International Tournament)
- 2006 – South Africa 1–0 Egypt (Nelson Mandela Challenge)
- 2007 – Ghana 4–1 Nigeria (friendly)
- 2007 – England U17 6–1 Northern Ireland U17 (friendly)
- 2019 – Brentford B 4–0 Harrow Borough (Middlesex Senior Cup Final)

Brentford hosted the Zambia and India international teams in pre-season friendly matches in 1994 and 2000 respectively and England Amateurs in February 1967. Griffin Park hosted more FA Amateur Cup semi-finals than any other ground, with 9 matches played between 1947 and 1974.

=== Tenants ===
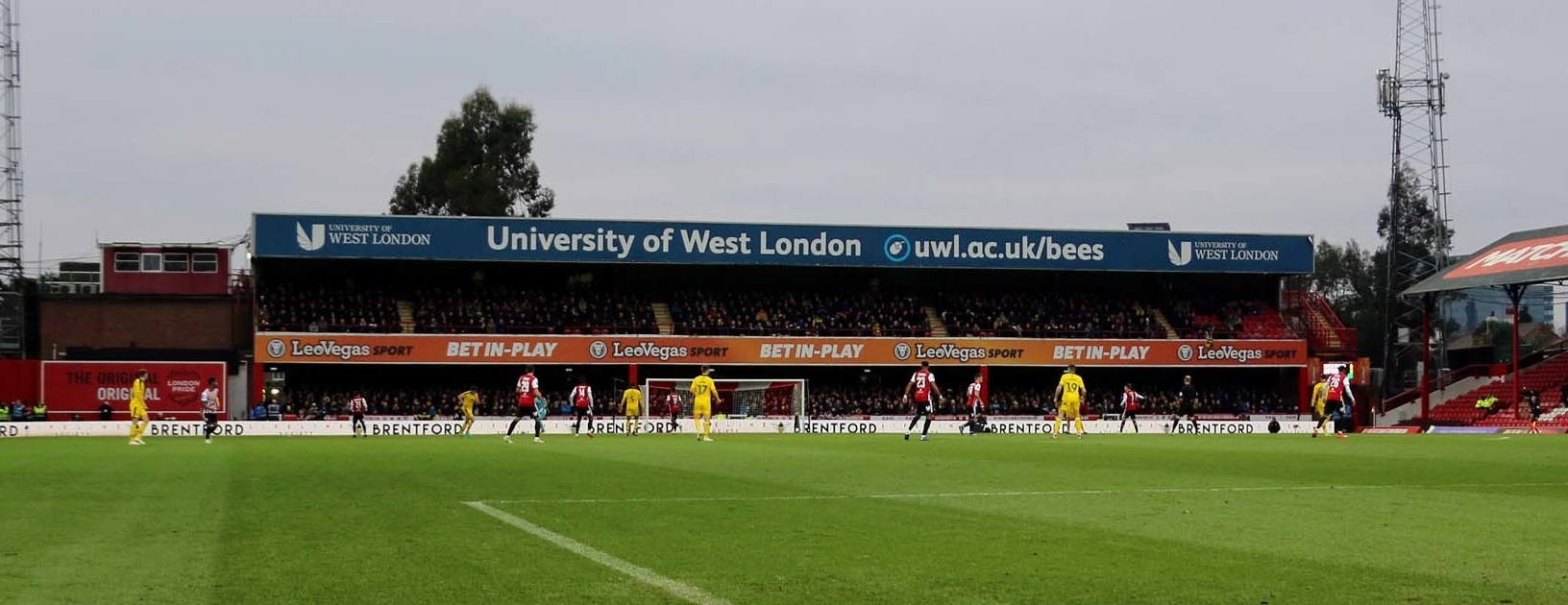
The Brook Road stand during an FA Cup match versus Oxford United in January 2019.

- In 2002, London Broncos rugby league team moved to Griffin Park. The club stayed at Griffin Park until the 2006 season, when it was re-branded Harlequins RL and moved to The Stoop. The Broncos had earlier played two Rugby League Championship matches at Griffin Park during the 1995–96 season.
- Chelsea's reserve and youth teams played their home games at Griffin Park from the beginning of the 2007–08 season until the end of 2009–10. This agreement included the upgrading of the home dressing rooms in 2007. The reserve team returned to Griffin Park for a number of fixtures during the 2012–13 season.
- Rugby union club London Welsh considered moving to Griffin Park in 2012, but ultimately moved to the Kassam Stadium in Oxford.

=== Other sports ===
The first ever paying event at Griffin Park was a sports meeting on 29 July 1904, which included a wrestling match. Athletics, tennis and Gaelic football also took place at the ground. The Heinz baseball team played at the ground in the late 1900s, after gaining admittance to the National Baseball League of Great Britain and Ireland.

== Advertising ==
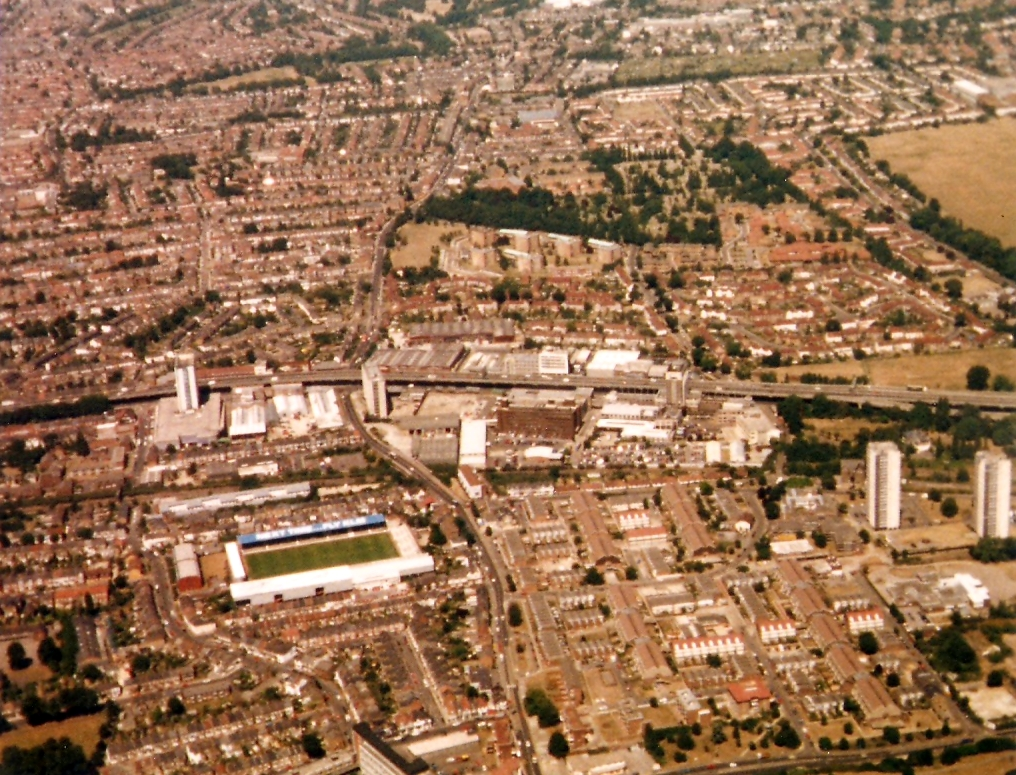
Griffin Park pictured from the Heathrow flight path in 1995, with a KLM advertisement visible on the roof of the New Road stand.

Griffin Park was beneath the flightpath of London Heathrow Airport and the roofs of the New Road and Braemar Road stands were used as a large advertising space. The roofs of both stands were used to advertise KLM, Ericsson, Infogrames and Qatar Airways. The New Road Stand roof was latterly sponsored by Matchbook, the club's official betting partner. In the late 2000s, the Braemar Road stand was sponsored by water cooler business Refreshing Solutions.

== "A pub on every corner" ==
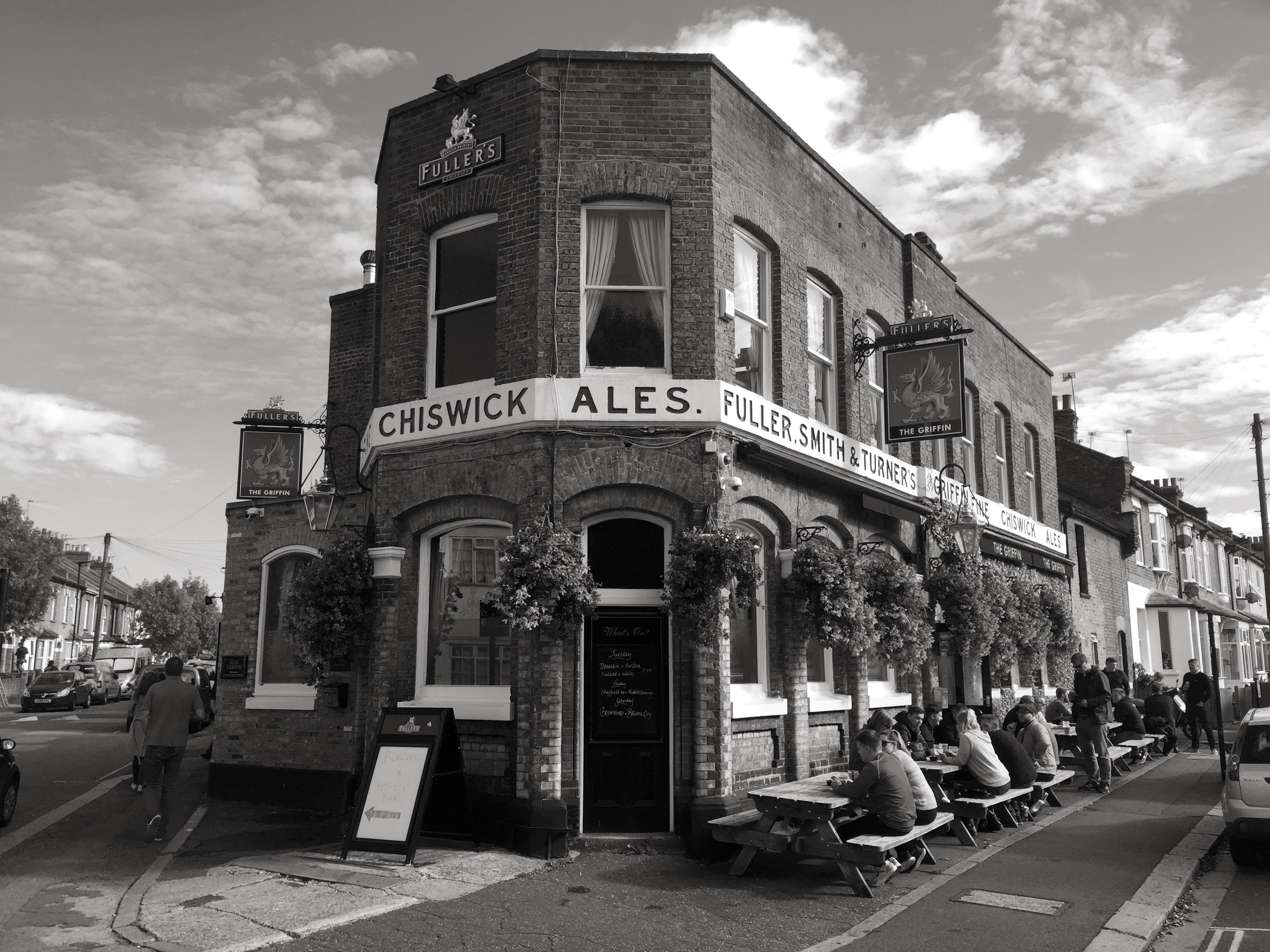
The Griffin pub, at the corner of Braemar Road and Brook Road.

Griffin Park was well known in football circles for being the only football ground in England to have a pub on each corner. The pubs are:

- The Griffin, located at the corner of Braemar Road and Brook Road. The interior and exterior of the pub was used as a location in the 2005 film Green Street and is also visible in the 1954 film The Rainbow Jacket. The interior is seen briefly in the 2018 film Bohemian Rhapsody.
- The Princess Royal, located at the corner of Braemar Road and Ealing Road. After the pub's closure in 2020, it was converted into the headquarters of the Diocese of The Armenian Church.
- The New Inn, located at the corner of New Road and Ealing Road.
- The Brook, located at the corner of New Road and Brook Road. Prior to 2019, it was named The Royal Oak.

== Appearances in media ==
Due to its convenient location in West London, Griffin Park has featured in a number of films, TV programmes and advertisements:

- The Winning Goal (film, 1920) – Footage was shot of a specially staged match between fictional teams Blacktown and Bichester, with both teams featuring 16 then-current international players.
- The Great Game (film, 1954) – Scenes were shot in and around the ground and during matches.
- Minder (The Long Ride Back to Scratchwood, TV, 1984) – The interior of the ground was used for football training scenes.
- Standing Room Only (TV, 1991) – The interior of the ground was featured in a sketch, with an emphasis on two of the club's main sponsors at the time, KLM and Bollingmores Car Distributors.
- Goal! (film, 2005) – Griffin Park featured as Newcastle United Reserves' home ground.
- Mike Bassett: Manager (TV, 2005) – Griffin Park doubled as the home ground of the series' fictitious team Wirral County. All Brentford-inscribed signs and notices were replaced around the ground with Wirral County equivalents.

== Ownership ==
The original lease on the ground ran out in 1925, but the deal was kept on ice and the club became freeholders in April 1936.

With Brentford in the Fourth Division and heavily in debt in the late 1960s, in March 1968 Jim Gregory (chairman of West London rivals Queens Park Rangers) offered £250,000 to buy the ground and move Queens Park Rangers to Griffin Park. Former Brentford chairman Walter Wheatley stepped in and provided the club with a £69,000 loan.

In 1998, then-chairman Ron Noades acquired the freehold of Griffin Park, through his company Griffin Park Stadium Limited. With Noades declaring he would only fund the club until 2000, the prospect of the sale of Griffin Park for development looked likely until 2006, when supporters' trust Bees United bought his majority shareholding. Noades' loans to the club were repaid by current owner Matthew Benham in 2007. On 15 September 2020, ownership of the ground was transferred to EcoWorld, a partner of Community Stadium developers Willmott Dixon.

== See also ==
- Ground improvements at English football Stadia
