= 2019 FA Cup final =

English association football match

- Wembley Stadium, the venue of the match
- Event: 2018–19 FA Cup
Manchester City	Watford
6	0
- Date: 18 May 2019
- Venue: Wembley Stadium, London
- Man of the Match: Kevin De Bruyne (Manchester City)
- Referee: Kevin Friend (Leicestershire)
- Attendance: 85,854

The 2019 FA Cup final was an association football match between Manchester City and Watford on 18 May 2019 at Wembley Stadium in London, England, and the 138th FA Cup final. It was Manchester City's eleventh appearance at the FA Cup final and Watford's second.

Kevin Friend was the referee for the match played in front of 85,854 spectators. Manchester City dominated the early stages of the final. In the 21st minute Abdoulaye Doucouré's shot struck Vincent Kompany's arm in the Manchester City penalty area, but after consultation with the video assistant referee (VAR), Friend declined to award a penalty and showed Doucouré the first yellow card of the game for his subsequent protests. In the 26th minute the deadlock was broken as David Silva scored from a Raheem Sterling header. Twelve minutes later Manchester City doubled their lead after Gabriel Jesus side-footed the ball past Kiko Femenía and Heurelho Gomes in the Watford goal. At 61 minutes City further extended their lead to 3–0 with a goal from substitute Kevin De Bruyne from close range. Seven minutes later Jesus made it 4–0 after taking the ball on the counter-attack and shooting past Gomes. In the 81st minute Sterling scored from a Bernardo Silva cross to make it 5–0, before scoring again in the 87th minute after his initial shot was pushed onto the post by Gomes. The match ended 6–0 to Manchester City: it was only the third time that a team had scored six goals in an FA Cup final, and the margin of victory is the joint-largest in an FA Cup final, equalling Bury's 6–0 win over Derby County in 1903.

De Bruyne was named man of the match. The win completed a domestic treble for Manchester City, who had already won the League Cup and the Premier League that season, which at the time was unprecedented by any English men's team. As they had already qualified for the UEFA Champions League, City's continental qualification place for winning the FA Cup went to the team that finished seventh in the league (Wolverhampton Wanderers), who entered the second qualifying round of UEFA Europa League.

== Route to the final ==
=== Manchester City ===
Route to the final for Manchester City
Round	Opposition	Score
3rd	Rotherham United (H)	7–0
4th	Burnley (H)	5–0
5th	Newport County (A)	4–1
QF	Swansea City (A)	3–2
SF	Brighton & Hove Albion (N)	1–0
Key: (H) = Home venue; (A) = Away venue; (N) = Neutral venue

As a Premier League club, Manchester City started in the third round where they were drawn against Championship team Rotherham United at the City of Manchester Stadium. In what Neil Johnston of the BBC described as a "powerful attacking performance", City dominated their opponents and won 7–0, with goals from Raheem Sterling, Phil Foden, an own goal from Semi Ajayi, Gabriel Jesus, Riyad Mahrez, Nicolás Otamendi, and Leroy Sané. It was Rotherham's heaviest ever FA Cup defeat, but their manager Paul Warne was philosophical: "It was a difficult day but we were playing against a world-class team. I don't think we embarrassed ourselves". In the fourth round, City were drawn at home once again, this time against fellow Premier League team Burnley. In a display which Burnley manager Sean Dyche called "clinical", City won 5–0 with goals from Jesus, Bernardo Silva, Kevin De Bruyne, Sergio Agüero and an own goal from Kevin Long.

In the fifth round, City played League Two side Newport County away at Rodney Parade in Newport, Wales. Once again, City dominated their opponents, and although the first half ended goalless, they won 4–1 courtesy of two goals from Foden, and one each from Sané and Mahrez, with Pádraig Amond scoring the consolation for Newport. In the quarter-finals, City drew Championship team Swansea City. Played at the Liberty Stadium, Swansea were 2–0 ahead at half time, but a goal from Silva and an own goal from Kristoffer Nordfeldt were followed by a controversial late winner from Agüero. Video replays demonstrated that the striker was offside, but as the video assistant referee (VAR) system was not in use at the Liberty Stadium, the goal was allowed to stand, and the Manchester club progressed with a 3–2 victory. In the semi-final, played at Wembley Stadium as a neutral venue, Manchester City faced Premier League side Brighton & Hove Albion. City progressed to the final after a 1–0 win with a Jesus goal from a De Bruyne cross in the fourth minute.

=== Watford ===
Route to the final for Watford
Round	Opposition	Score
3rd	Woking (A)	2–0
4th	Newcastle United (A)	2–0
5th	Queens Park Rangers (A)	1–0
QF	Crystal Palace (H)	2–1
SF	Wolverhampton Wanderers (N)	3–2
Key: (H) = Home venue; (A) = Away venue; (N) = Neutral venue

As a Premier League club, Watford also started in the third round where they faced National League South side Woking away at the Kingfield Stadium. There were 110 places in the English football league system between the clubs, and Watford dominated the match. They won 2–0 with goals from Will Hughes and Troy Deeney. In the next round Watford played fellow Premier League side Newcastle United away at St James' Park. A total of eighteen changes were made to the starting line-ups of the two teams. After a goalless first half, Andre Gray opened the scoring for Watford, and Isaac Success' strike in injury time ensured Watford's progress with a 2–0 win.

In the fifth round Watford played Championship side Queens Park Rangers away at Loftus Road. Watford won 1–0 when Étienne Capoue scored with his side's only shot on target of the game, just before half time. In the quarter-final, they played Premier League Crystal Palace at home at Vicarage Road. Watford took the lead mid-way through the first half with a Capoue strike, but Michy Batshuayi levelled the score in the 62nd minute. Gray, a second-half substitute, then scored the winning goal within two minutes of his introduction, ensuring a 2–1 Watford victory and progression to the semi-final at Wembley. There they faced Premier League Wolverhampton Wanderers (Wolves). A header from Matt Doherty and a volley from Raúl Jiménez put Wolves into a 2–0 lead before Gerard Deulofeu reduced the deficit with what BBC reporter Phil McNulty described as "an audacious angled flick" with eleven minutes of the game remaining. Four minutes into injury time, Deeney levelled the score from the penalty spot, forcing the game into extra time. Deulofeu then scored his second in the 104th minute to ensure Watford's progression to the final with a 3–2 victory.

== Match ==
=== Background ===
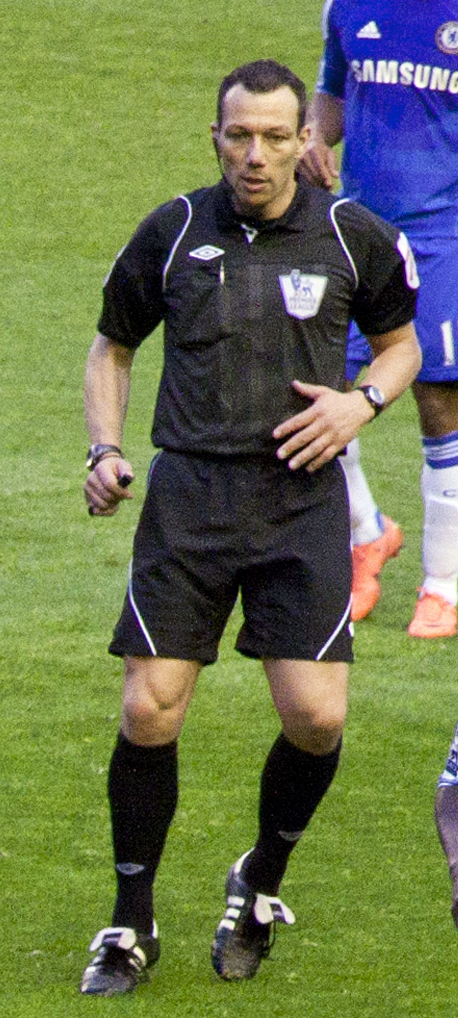
Kevin Friend (pictured in 2012) was the match referee.

This was Manchester City's eleventh FA Cup Final and their first since losing 1–0 to Wigan Athletic in the 2013 final. City had won the FA Cup on five previous occasions, the most recent being the 2011 final when they beat Stoke City 1–0. Watford qualified for their first FA Cup Final since 1984 when they lost 2–0 to Everton. In the two meetings between the clubs during the 2018–19 Premier League, City won 2–1 at Vicarage Road in December 2018 and 3–1 at the City of Manchester Stadium. Watford had beaten Manchester City once in the previous seventeen meetings, including a losing streak of ten games going back to 2013. The league season ended with City as champions and Watford eleventh, forty-eight points behind. It was City's second cup final of the season: in February they had won the 2018–19 League Cup against Chelsea in a penalty shootout. This meant that City were aiming to become the first club in English football history to win the domestic treble which came into existence with the creation of the League Cup in the 1960–61 season.

The referee for the match was Kevin Friend representing the Leicestershire and Rutland County Football Association. He was promoted to the Select Group in 2009 and had previously officiated over Wembley matches including the 2012 FA Community Shield and the 2013 Football League Cup Final. Friend's assistants were Constantine Hatzidakis (Kent County Football Association) and Matthew Wilkes (Birmingham County Football Association). The fourth official was Graham Scott (Berks & Bucks Football Association), and the reserve assistant referee was Edward Smart (Kent County Football Association). Andre Marriner (Birmingham County Football Association) was the video assistant referee and was assisted by Harry Lennard (Sussex County Football Association). Both clubs received an allocation of approximately 28,000 tickets. For adults, these were priced £45, £70, £115 and £145, with concessions in place. 14,000 tickets were distributed through the "football family", which included volunteers representing County FAs, FA-affiliated leagues, clubs and charities. Manchester City supporters were seated on the east side of the ground, and Watford's on the west. The match was broadcast live in the UK on BBC One and BT Sport. The traditional performance of the hymn "Abide with Me" was by the Band of the Scots Guards and a mixed choir. Former players Luther Blissett (Watford) and Tony Book (Manchester City) brought out the trophy before the teams were introduced to Prince William, Duke of Cambridge.

Watford left-back José Holebas was sent off on the last day of the Premier League season in a 4–1 home defeat by West Ham United. The resulting one-match suspension would have ruled him out of the final but, on 13 May, the red card was rescinded, clearing him for selection. Deulofeu had recovered from a dead leg sustained against West Ham. The final was also slated to have been the Watford goalkeeper Heurelho Gomes' last professional football match, after he announced his intention to retire at the end of the season. He was selected in preference to Ben Foster, and Adrian Mariappa replaced Christian Kabasele in Watford's defence. Manchester City were still without long-term injured Benjamin Mendy but both Fernandinho and De Bruyne were available for selection, the former having recovered from a knee injury while the latter was back from damaging his hamstring. Jesus was preferred up front with Agüero starting on the bench, along with De Bruyne. Watford played in their standard home kit of black and yellow stripes, black shorts and black socks while City's players wore light blue shirts, white shorts and white socks.

=== First half ===
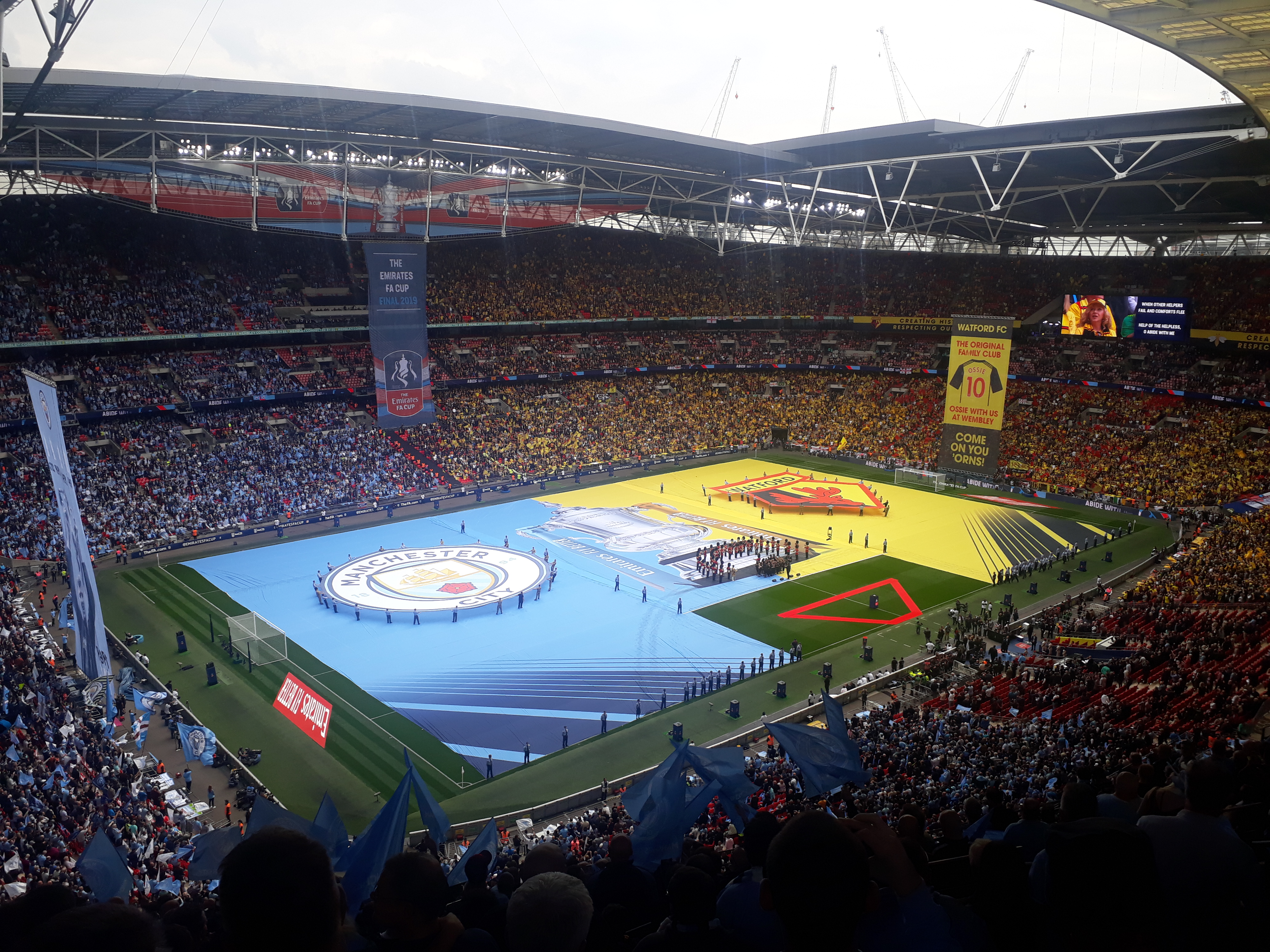
Pre-match display

The match was kicked off by Watford just after 5 p.m. on 18 May 2019 in front of a Wembley crowd of 85,854. The first chance of the game fell to Aymeric Laporte on 4 minutes whose long-range shot flew over Watford's crossbar. Three minutes later, Bernardo Silva made a run but his pass into the Watford penalty area was intercepted by Craig Cathcart. In the 10th minute, Mahrez won a corner for City which was cleared by Watford who went on the counter-attack. A cross from Deulofeu found Roberto Pereyra whose shot was saved by the Manchester City goalkeeper Ederson. Bernardo Silva then saw his strike saved by Gomes two minutes later and on 16 minutes, City won another corner off Holebas. Gomes failed to gather the set piece but Watford cleared the ball.

In the 21st minute, Pereyra passed to Abdoulaye Doucouré in the Manchester City box, whose shot struck Vincent Kompany's arm. After consultation with the VAR, Friend declined to award a penalty and showed Doucouré the first yellow card of the game for his subsequent protests. Two minutes later, Sterling was unable to capitalise on a Gomes handling error before Jesus' shot was deflected for a corner by Mariappa. Capoue cleared the ball out to Deulofeu on the break, but Ederson was quick to react and clear the danger. In the 26th minute the deadlock was broken, as David Silva scored his first goal in 28 games, shooting across Gomes from a Sterling header. On 33 minutes, Mahrez passed to Jesus who was prevented from shooting by a Mariappa tackle. Five minutes later Manchester City doubled their lead. Bernardo Silva played a ball into a space on the left side of the six-yard box for Jesus who side-footed past Kiko Femenía and Gomes in the Watford goal. A minute later, Gomes pushed a Mahrez shot away and in the 44th minute, Watford's Hughes struck from distance and the ball was deflected for a corner. The set piece came to nothing and the half ended with Manchester City holding a 2–0 lead.

=== Second half ===
No changes were made to either side during half time, and Watford kicked the second half off. They had the first chance, after 47 minutes, when Deeney found Pereyra who chose to try to find Hughes instead of shooting. Sterling then found Jesus whose shot from a tight angle was saved by Gomes. Oleksandr Zinchenko then crossed for Jesus who headed the ball into the Watford net but the goal was disallowed for offside. Watford then had a brief spell of pressure but failed to capitalise. In the 55th minute, Manchester City made their first substitution of the afternoon with De Bruyne coming on to replace Mahrez. İlkay Gündoğan's corner on 57 minutes found Laporte whose header was wide. Watford responded with Deulofeu picking up a long ball but his shot was mishit wide of the far post. David Silva was then shown a yellow card in the 60th minute for a foul on Hughes. On 61 minutes City further extended their lead to 3–0 with a goal from De Bruyne. Jesus beat Pereyra in the air and passed to De Bruyne, who took the ball past Gomes and scored from close range.

In the 65th minute, Watford made a double substitution with Deulofeu and Pereyra coming off, to be replaced by Gray and Success. Three minutes later, Jesus made it 4–0 after taking the ball on the counter-attack and shooting past Gomes. De Bruyne then shot high and wide in the 70th minute before Sané was brought on for Gündogan and Watford's Hughes was replaced by Tom Cleverley. After a period of City possession, John Stones then came on for David Silva, and in the 80th minute, Kiko was booked for a foul on Sané. In the 81st minute, Sterling scored from a Bernardo Silva cross to make it 5–0, before scoring again in the 87th minute after his initial shot was pushed onto the post by Gomes. Two minutes into injury time, Stones' strike from around 10 yards (9.1 m) was saved by Gomes and Friend blew the final whistle, ending the match with Manchester City winning 6–0.

=== Details ===
18 May 2019
17:00 BST

Manchester City	6–0	Watford
D. Silva 26'; Gabriel Jesus 38', 68'; De Bruyne 61'; Sterling 81', 87'

Wembley Stadium, London
Attendance: 85,854
Referee: Kevin Friend (Leicestershire)

Manchester City	Watford

GK	31	(Brazil) Ederson
RB	2	(England) Kyle Walker
CB	4	(Belgium) Vincent Kompany (c)
CB	14	(France) Aymeric Laporte
LB	35	(Ukraine) Oleksandr Zinchenko
CM	20	(Portugal) Bernardo Silva
CM	8	(Germany) İlkay Gündoğan		(substituted off) 73'
CM	21	(Spain) David Silva	(yellow card) 60'	(substituted off) 79'
RF	26	(Algeria) Riyad Mahrez		(substituted off) 55'
CF	33	(Brazil) Gabriel Jesus
LF	7	(England) Raheem Sterling
Substitutes:
GK	49	(Kosovo) Arijanet Muric
DF	3	(Brazil) Danilo
DF	5	(England) John Stones		(substituted on) 79'
DF	30	(Argentina) Nicolás Otamendi
MF	17	(Belgium) Kevin De Bruyne		(substituted on) 55'
MF	19	(Germany) Leroy Sané		(substituted on) 73'
FW	10	(Argentina) Sergio Agüero
Manager:
(Spain) Pep Guardiola

GK	1	(Brazil) Heurelho Gomes
RB	21	(Spain) Kiko Femenía	(yellow card) 80'
CB	6	(Jamaica) Adrian Mariappa
CB	15	(Northern Ireland) Craig Cathcart
LB	25	(Greece) José Holebas
RM	19	(England) Will Hughes		(substituted off) 73'
CM	16	(France) Abdoulaye Doucouré	(yellow card) 21'
CM	29	(France) Étienne Capoue
LM	37	(Argentina) Roberto Pereyra		(substituted off) 66'
CF	7	(Spain) Gerard Deulofeu		(substituted off) 66'
CF	9	(England) Troy Deeney (c)
Substitutes:
GK	26	(England) Ben Foster
DF	2	(Netherlands) Daryl Janmaat
DF	11	(Italy) Adam Masina
DF	27	(Belgium) Christian Kabasele
MF	8	(England) Tom Cleverley		(substituted on) 73'
FW	10	(Nigeria) Isaac Success		(substituted on) 66'
FW	18	(England) Andre Gray		(substituted on) 66'
Manager:
(Spain) Javi Gracia

Man of the Match:
Kevin De Bruyne (Manchester City)

Assistant referees:
Constantine Hatzidakis (Kent)
Matthew Wilkes (Birmingham)
Fourth official:
Graham Scott (Berks & Bucks)
Reserve assistant referee:
Edward Smart (Birmingham)
Video assistant referee:
Andre Marriner (Birmingham)
Assistant video assistant referee:
Harry Lennard (Sussex)

Match rules

- 90 minutes
- 30 minutes of extra time if necessary
- Penalty shoot-out if scores still level
- Seven named substitutes
- Maximum of three substitutions, with a fourth allowed in extra time

=== Statistics ===
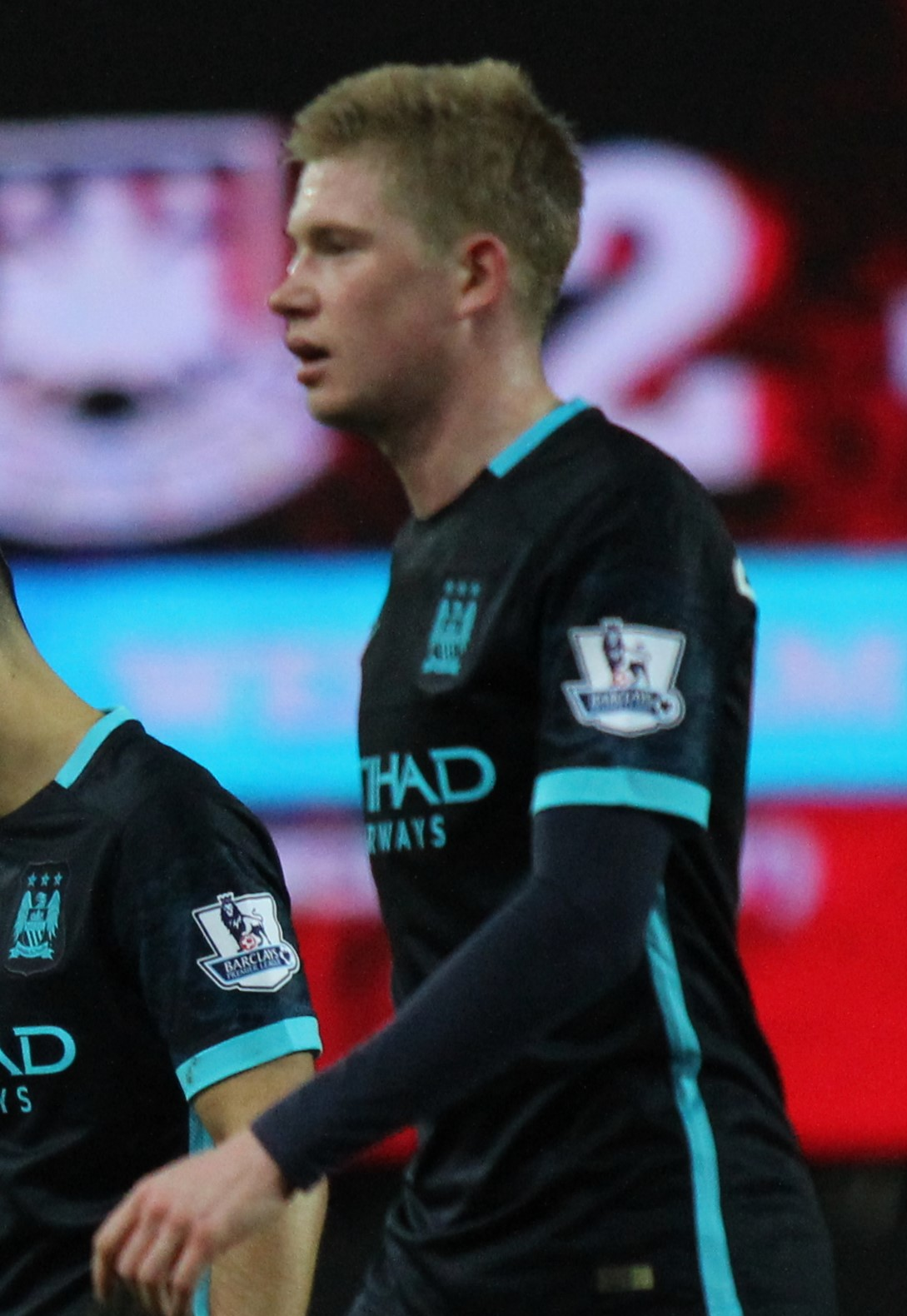
Kevin De Bruyne (pictured in 2016) was named man of the match.

Statistics
	Manchester City	Watford
Total shots	23	11
Shots on target	12	2
Corner kicks	13	1
Fouls committed	8	5
Possession	66%	34%
Yellow cards	1	2
Red cards	0	0

== Post-match ==
Pep Guardiola, the winning manager, was elated: "It was an incredible final for us and we have finished an incredible year ... To all the people at the club a big congratulations, especially the players because they are the reason why we have won these titles". His opposite number, Javi Gracia said: "we knew before the game we had to play the perfect game ... We started well and we created the best chance after 10 minutes with Roberto Pereyra but after that they dominated. They were better, congratulations to them and we will try again". De Bruyne was named as the man of the match. Kompany, the City captain, said: "As soon as we scored the two goals and they had to come at us and press ... It made it easier for us. It wasn't as easy as the score suggests". The day after the game, Kompany said that the match was his final game for the club as he would be leaving after eleven years to become the player-manager of Anderlecht. Watford's Gomes decided against retirement and instead signed a one-year extension to his contract.

Daniel Taylor writing in The Guardian described the game as a "cakewalk" for City. City scored 26 goals during the season's cup campaign, the most by any FA Cup-winning team since the 1925–26 FA Cup. It was also the largest margin of victory in an FA Cup Final since the 1903 final which ended with the same scoreline, Bury beating Derby County. Manchester City became the first English men's team to win a domestic treble, having already won the EFL Cup and Premier League that season.

Winning the FA Cup meant that Manchester City qualified to play Liverpool, the Premier League runners-up, in the Community Shield in August which they won on penalties after a 1–1 draw. City's victory meant that Wolves went into the second qualifying round of the 2019–20 UEFA Europa League having finished seventh in the Premier League while Manchester United went directly into the group stages.

== Sources ==
- 2019 Final at FA
