= FA County Youth Cup =

- Founded: 1944
- Region: England
- Current champions: Manchester FA
- Website: FA County Youth Cup

The FA County Youth Cup is a football competition run by The Football Association in England. It was launched in the 1944–45 season to provide young players who had not yet signed with a professional club, even on a scholarship basis, with competitive representative football.

Each County Football Association provides a team made up of school or league players affiliated to the County Association that are under 18.

== Finals ==
Season	Winners	Score	Runners-up	Venue
1944–45	Staffordshire	3–2 (agg)	Wiltshire	1L: Twerton Park; 2L: Victoria Ground
1945–46	Berks & Bucks	4–3 (agg)	Durham	1L: Elm Park; 2L: Roker Park
1946–47	Durham	4–2 (agg)	Essex	1L: Upton Park; 2L: Roker Park
1947–48	Essex	5–3 (agg)	Liverpool	1L: 2L: Goodison Park
1948–49	Liverpool	4–3 (agg)	Middlesex	1L: Goodison Park; 2L: White Hart Lane
1949–50	Essex	4–3 (agg)	Middlesex	1L: Highbury; 2L: Wembley
1950–51	Middlesex	3–1 (agg)	Leicestershire and Rutland	1L: Filbert Street; 2L: Lower Mead
1951–52	Sussex	3–1 (agg)	Liverpool	1L: Goodison Park; 2L: Goldstone Ground
1952–53	Sheffield & Hallamshire	5–3 (agg)	Hampshire	1L: Hillsborough; 2L: Recreation Ground
1953–54	Liverpool	4–1 (agg)	Gloucestershire	1L: 2L: Anfield
1954–55	Bedfordshire	2–0 (agg)	Sheffield & Hallamshire	1L: 2L:
1955–56	Middlesex	3–2 (agg)	Staffordshire	1L: 2L:
1956–57	Hampshire	4–3 (agg)	Cheshire	1L: 2L:
1957–58	Staffordshire	8–0 (agg)	London	1L: 2L:
1958–59	Birmingham	7–5 (agg)	London	1L: 2L:
1959–60	London	6–4 (agg)	Birmingham	1L: 2L:
1960–61	Lancashire	6–3 (agg)	Nottinghamshire	1L: 2L:
1961–62	Middlesex	6–3 (agg)	Nottinghamshire	1L: 2L:
1962–63	Durham	3–2 (agg)	Essex	1L: 2L:
1963–64	Sheffield & Hallamshire	1–0 (agg)	Birmingham	1L: 2L:
1964–65	Northumberland	7–4 (agg)	Middlesex	1L: 2L:
1965–66	Leicestershire and Rutland	6–5 (agg)	London	1L: 2L:
1966–67	Northamptonshire	5–4 (agg)	Hertfordshire	1L: 2L:
1967–68	North Riding	7–4 (agg)	Devon	1L: 2L:
1968–69	Northumberland	1–0 (agg)	Sussex	1L: 2L:
1969–70	Hertfordshire	2–1	Cheshire	
1970–71	Lancashire	2–0	Gloucestershire	
1971–72	Middlesex	2–0	Liverpool	Lower Mead
1972–73	Hertfordshire	3–0	Northumberland	
1973–74	Nottinghamshire	2–0	London	
1974–75	Durham	2–1	Bedfordshire	
1975–76	Northamptonshire	7–1	Surrey	Kingstonian F.C. Richmond Road
1976–77	Liverpool	3–0	Surrey	
1977–78	Liverpool	3–1	Kent	
1978–79	Hertfordshire	4–1	Liverpool	
1979–80	Liverpool	2–0	Lancashire	
1980–81	Lancashire	3–2	East Riding	
1981–82	Devon	3–2	Kent	Venue Replay held at Plymouth Argyle FC after first game drawn 0:0 in Gravesend FC.
1982–83	London	3–0	Gloucestershire	
1983–84	Cheshire	2–1	Manchester	
1984–85	East Riding	2–1	Middlesex	
1985–86	Hertfordshire	4–0	Manchester	
1986–87	North Riding	3–1	Gloucestershire	
1987–88	East Riding	5–3	Middlesex	
1988–89	Liverpool	2–1	Hertfordshire	
1989–90	Staffordshire	2–1	Hampshire	
1990–91	Lancashire	6–0	Surrey	
1991–92	Nottinghamshire	1–0	Surrey	
1992–93	Durham	4–0	Liverpool	
1993–94	West Riding	3–1	Sussex	[Bradford City Football Club
1994–95	Liverpool	3–2	Essex	
1995–96	Durham	1–0	Gloucestershire	
1996–97	Cambridgeshire	1–0	Lancashire	
1997–98	Northumberland	2–1	West Riding	
1998–99	Durham	1–0	Sussex	Leyburn Grove
1999–00	Birmingham	2–1	Surrey	St Andrew's
2000–01	Northamptonshire	3–0	Birmingham	Molineux
2001–02	Birmingham	2–1	Durham	Bescot Stadium
2002–03	Northumberland	1–0	Liverpool	Haig Avenue
2003–04	Durham	4–0	North Riding	Riverside Stadium
2004–05	Suffolk	2–1	Hampshire	Portman Road
2005–06	Bedfordshire	3–2	Durham	The Darlington Arena
2006–07	West Riding	1–1‡	Suffolk	Valley Parade
2007–08	Suffolk	2–1	Cambridgeshire	Portman Road
2008–09	Birmingham	2–1	Kent	Priestfield Stadium
2009–10	Kent	1–0	Sheffield & Hallamshire	Priestfield Stadium
2010–11	Norfolk	4–2	Staffordshire	Britannia Stadium
2011–12	Essex	4–2†	West Riding	Colchester Community Stadium
2012–13	Bedfordshire	4–4‡	Manchester	Spotland
2013–14	Lancashire	3–2†	Suffolk	Portman Road
2014–15	Cheshire	3–2	Middlesex	The Hive
2015–16	Liverpool	2-0	Sussex	Broadfield Stadium
2016–17	Middlesex	2-1	Cornwall	The Hive
2017–18	Norfolk	2–0	Staffordshire	Bet365 Stadium
2018–19	Manchester	3–0	Norfolk	Spotland Stadium

†–After extra time
‡–After penalties
