= Kevin Friend =

English football referee (born 1971)

Kevin Friend
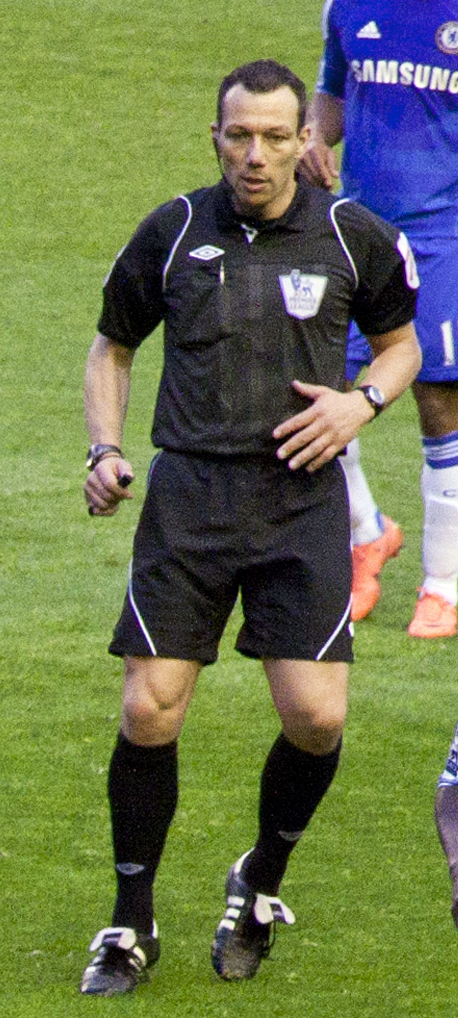
- Born: Bristol, England
- Full name: Kevin Friend
- Born: July 8, 1971 (age 55); Bristol, England
Years		Role
2003–2022		Referee

Kevin Friend (born 8 July 1971) is a former professional football referee based in Leicester. He is a member of the Leicestershire and Rutland County Football Association.

His most notable appointments have been to referee the 2012 Community Shield, played at Villa Park, the 2013 League Cup final which was held at Wembley Stadium, and the 2019 FA Cup final which was also held at Wembley.

== Career ==
Friend started refereeing at the age of 14 in his home county of Leicestershire. He officiated in the Leicestershire Senior League and Midland Football Alliance before being promoted to the National List of Referees, and later to the Select Group of Referees ahead of the 2009–10 season. His first Premier League fixture was on 20 September 2009: a 2–1 victory for Wolverhampton Wanderers over Fulham; Friend showed two yellow cards during his debut appointment in England's top-flight.

Friend issued his first Premier League red card on 15 December 2009 to Sunderland captain Lorik Cana for a second bookable offence in his team's 2–0 defeat to Aston Villa.

He refereed the 2009 FA Vase final at Wembley Stadium on 10 May between Whitley Bay and Glossop North End, won 2–0 by the Bay.

During a Football League One match in 2010 between Norwich City and Milton Keynes Dons Friend issued 11 yellow cards, including two to Dons player Aaron Wilbraham.

Friend showed a red card to Sunderland defender Wes Brown in a 2013 Premier League match against Stoke City, which the FA later rescinded.

In 2016, Friend was controversially prevented from officiating a Premier League match between Stoke City and title contenders Tottenham Hotspur, due to him being a supporter of fellow title challengers Leicester City.

At the end of the 2021–22 season, Friend retired from officiating, but will continue to work for PGMOL as manager of the Select Group 2 referees.

=== 2012 FA Community Shield ===
On 3 July 2012, it was announced that Friend would referee the 2012 FA Community Shield, played on 12 August at Villa Park. His assistants were Michael McDonough and Richard West, and Anthony Taylor was the fourth official.

Chelsea were defeated 3–2 by Manchester City. Branislav Ivanović was sent off for the Blues for a high challenge towards the end of the first half. Ivanović did not serve any subsequent suspension, however, after FA rule changes regarding pre-season fixtures.

=== 2013 League Cup final ===
Friend refereed the 2013 League Cup final at Wembley Stadium on 24 February. The match was contested by League 2's Bradford City and Premier League Swansea City.

Swansea won the final 5–0. An incident early in the second-half, when the Premier League side were already 3–0 up, saw Friend adjudge Bradford goalkeeper Matt Duke to have committed a professional foul. The official dismissed Duke and awarded Swansea a penalty kick, which was converted by Jonathan de Guzmán; he also scored again in the 90th minute. The other Swansea goals came courtesy of Nathan Dyer (2) and Michu.

=== 2019 FA Cup final ===
Friend refereed the 2019 FA Cup final at Wembley Stadium on 18 May 2019. The match was contested between Manchester City and Watford, with Manchester City winning the match 6–0.

== Statistics ==
Season	Games	Total (yellow card)	(yellow card) per game	Total (red card)	(red card) per game
2003–04	27	98	3.63	4	0.15
2004–05	37	107	2.89	7	0.19
2005–06	21	45	2.14	2	0.09
2006–07	34	87	2.56	6	0.18
2007–08	41	100	2.44	11	0.27
2008–09	46	124	2.69	6	0.13
2009–10	34	133	3.91	7	0.21
2010–11	33	116	3.52	7	0.21
2011–12	33	120	3.64	3	0.09
2012–13	34	120	3.53	3	0.09
2013–14	31	98	3.16	1	0.03
2014–15	35	141	4.03	5	0.14
2015–16	31	100	3.23	6	0.06
2016–17	32	127	3.97	2	0.06
2017–18	33	66	2.00	1	0.03
2018–19	39	139	3.56	3	0.08
2019–20	33	89	2.70	8	0.24
2020–21	31	74	2.39	3	0.10
2021–22	28	109	3.89	2	0.07

Statistics are for all competitions as of 18 May 2019. No records are available prior to 2003–04.
