= Actonians W.F.C. =

Football Club, founded 1998

Actonians
- Full name: Actonians Womens Football Club
- Founded: 1998
- Ground: Berkeley Fields, Greenford
- League: FA Women's National League Division One South East
- 2025–26: FA Women's National League Division One South East, 5th of 12
- Website: https://www.actonianslfc.com/
Home colours

Actonians WFC is a women's football team that was founded in 1998 as Chiswick United, changing their name in 2008 to Actonians. In 2025 they changed from Actonians LFC to Actonians WFC. They also have a strong girls section with teams from U9s-U18s competing in the Capital Girls League. Actonians WFC is based in Acton and the First XI currently plays at Berkeley Fields, North Greenford FC whilst the Reserves and Third team play at Gunnersbury Park and Actonians Clubhouse.

This team competes in the FA Women's National League Division One South East and their development teams play in the Greater London League They have won both a regional league title and league cup double in 2014/15, and in 2018/19 they won the Capital Women's Senior Cup final beating Leyton Orient 1–0. They were runners up in the same competition in 2021, losing on penalties to QPR after a 2-2 draw.

Actonians WFC is currently linked with Middlesex FA who also support a number of other women's team such as London Bees, QPR Ladies FC, Enfield Town Ladies FC, and Denham Ladies FC.

== Honours ==
London and South East Women's Regional Football League

- Winners (1): 2014-15

London and South East Women's Regional Football League Cup

- Winners (1): 2014-15

Capital Women's Senior Cup

- Winners (1): 2018-19
- Runners up (1): 2020-21
