= Terry Stanley =

English footballer (born 1951)

Personal information
- Full name: Terence James Stanley
- Date of birth: 2 January 1951 (age 75)
- Place of birth: Brighton, England
- Height: 5 ft 7 in (1.70 m)
- Positions: Midfielder; full back

Youth career
- West Ham United

Senior career*
Years	Team	Apps	(Gls)
- Lewes
196?–1972	Brighton & Hove Albion	22	(0)
1972–1974	Ramsgate Athletic		
1974–197?	Horsham		
- Lewes
- Burgess Hill Town
- Worthing
- Steyning Town
- Southwick
- Peacehaven & Telscombe

Managerial career
- 1978: Lewes (caretaker)
- * Club domestic league appearances and goals

Terence James Stanley (born 2 January 1951) is an English former professional footballer who played as a midfielder or full back in the Football League for Brighton & Hove Albion.

== Life and career ==
Stanley was born in 1951 in Brighton, where he attended Coldean School and Westlain Grammar School. He represented both town and county in schools football, and was on the books of West Ham United as a youngster. He moved into adult football with Lewes, then playing in the Athenian League, from where he joined Football League Third Division club Brighton & Hove Albion. After playing for the Sussex team that lost in the final of the 1968–69 FA County Youth Cup, Stanley turned professional with Albion in November 1969.

He made his first-team debut on 13 December in a goalless draw at home to Orient, and made another 6 league appearances in his first season. He never established himself in the side – of his 16 appearances in 1970–71, 6 were as a substitute – and he played only reserve-team football the following season before being released on a free transfer.

He went on to play non-league football for clubs including Ramsgate Athletic, Horsham, Lewes, Burgess Hill Town, Worthing, Steyning Town, Southwick and Peacehaven & Telscombe. He also acted as caretaker manager of Lewes in 1978.
