= Capital Women's Senior Cup =

Football tournament in England

- Organiser(s): Middlesex FA, Surrey FA, London FA, Amateur Football Alliance
- Founded: 2013
- Region: Greater London
- Teams: 18 clubs (2023–24)
- Current champions: Fulham (1st title)
- Most championships: Charlton Athletic (5 titles)

The Capital Women's Senior Cup is an annual women's association football cup competition run jointly by the Middlesex FA, the London FA, the Surrey FA and the Amateur Football Alliance. The competition is open to clubs in tiers 3 to 5 of the Women's Football Pyramid and under-21 and under-23 teams of clubs in tiers 1 to 2 of the Women's Football Pyramid.

== History ==
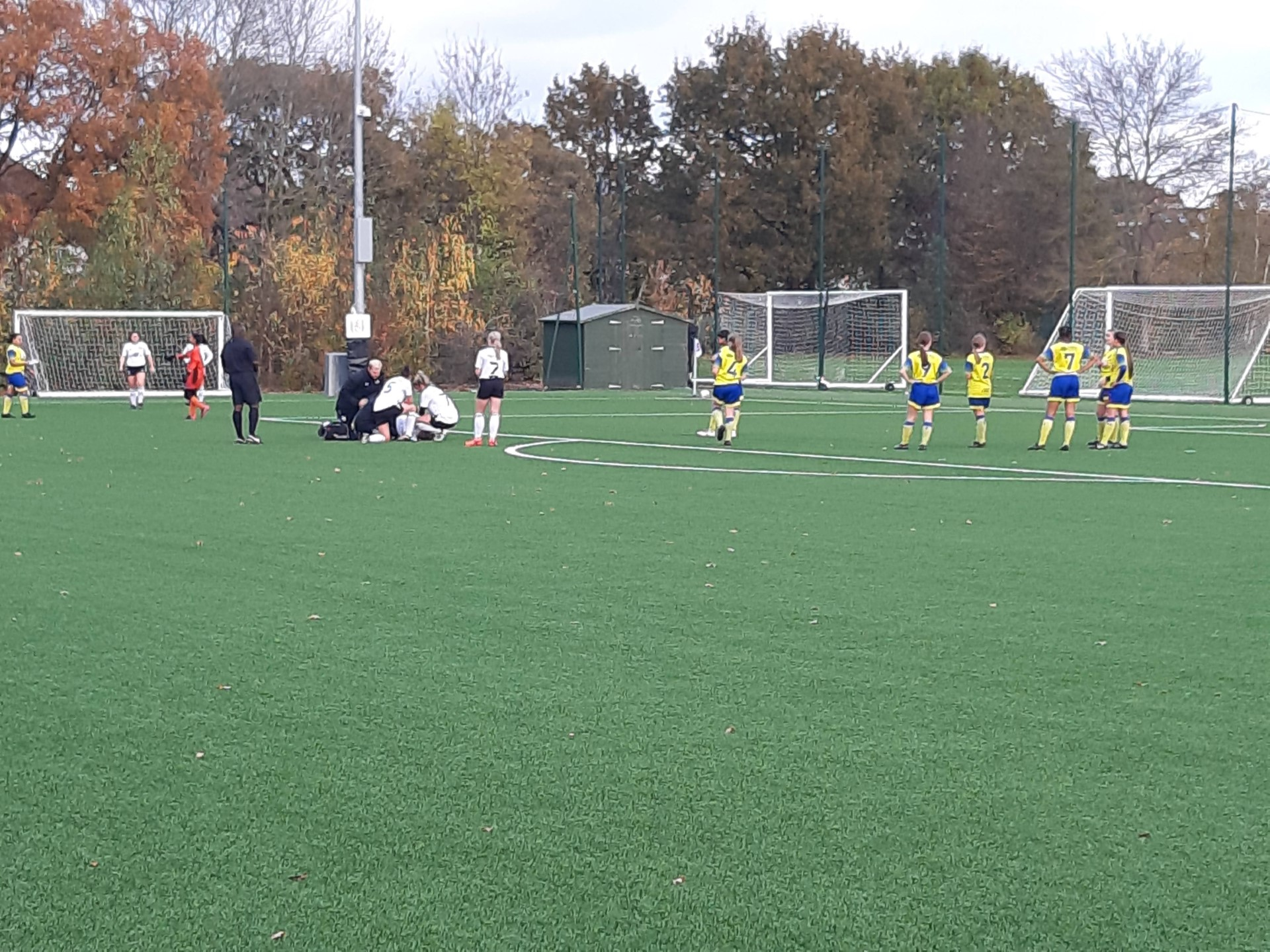
Fulham play Haringey in the Capital Women's Senior Cup in 2021

The Capital Women's Cups were established in 2013, on the initiative of Jackie Newing of the Amateur Football Alliance. The intention was to consolidate London's fragmented system of county cups, which saw considerable mismatches across the five geographical cup competitions, into three competitions based on league position.

Initially the Senior Cup was open to all clubs in tiers 1 to 5 of the Women's Football Pyramid, but since 2018 this has been restricted to tiers 3 to 5, plus under-23 teams from the top two tiers.

The Intermediate Cup is open to clubs in tiers 6 and 7 and the Junior Cup is open to Greater London Women's Football League Division 1 and 2 clubs, plus any club in tier 7 or below (including clubs not in a league).

It replaced the London Women's Cup, the Middlesex FA Women's Cup and the Surrey Women's FA Cup. Administration of the competitions rotate between the four organising associations.

The first five editions of the tournament were dominated by Charlton Athletic W.F.C. Their run of dominance was only ended by reformatting the competition to exclude tier 1 and 2 senior teams.

Women's Super League and Women's Championship academy clubs have enjoyed mixed fortunes in the competition. Arsenal W.F.C. Academy won the 2022–23 and 2024–25 editions of the tournament whereas in 2023–24 only Tottenham Hotspur W.F.C. Academy progressed beyond the second round, losing to Haringey Borough in the quarter finals.

== Format ==
The tournament is a single-legged, unseeded, knock-out competition with team. If a tie is level after 90 minutes, the match is decided by a penalty shoot-out.

== Winners and Finalists ==
Season	Winners	Runners up	Score	Venue	Attendance
2013–14	Charlton Athletic (1)	Queens Park Rangers	2–1	Imber Court, Molesey	
2014–15	Charlton Athletic (2)	West Ham United	5–0	Earlsmead Stadium, Harrow	222
2015–16	Charlton Athletic (3)	Tottenham Hotspur	3–0	Harry Abrahams Stadium, Finchley	
2016–17	Charlton Athletic (4)	Tottenham Hotspur	2–1	Harry Abrahams Stadium, Finchley	136
2017–18	Charlton Athletic (5)	Crystal Palace	2–1	Bedfont Recreation Ground, Bedfont	
2018–19	Actonians (1)	Leyton Orient	1–0	Reynolds Fields, Perivale	181
2019–20	Not held due to COVID-19 pandemic				
2020–21	Queens Park Rangers (1)	Actonians	2–2 (4–3 p)	Bedfont Recreation Ground, Bedfont	317
2021–22	Ashford Town (1)	Dulwich Hamlet	2–0	Meadowbank, Dorking	204
2022–23	Arsenal Academy (1)	AFC Wimbledon	2–1	Green Lane, Hounslow	400
2023–24	Ashford Town (2)	Haringey Borough	4–2	Silver Jubilee Park, Hendon	170
2024–25	Arsenal Academy (2)	Dulwich Hamlet	2–0	Uxbridge F.C., Yiewsley	
2025–26	Fulham (1)	AFC Wimbledon	1–0	Gander Green Lane, Sutton	442

== Statistics ==
=== Performance by club ===
Club	Winners	Runners up	Winning years
Charlton Athletic	5	0	2014, 2015, 2016, 2017, 2018
Arsenal Academy	2	0	2023, 2025
Ashford Town	2	0	2022, 2024
Actonians	1	1	2019
Queens Park Rangers	1	1	2021
Fulham	1	0	2026
AFC Wimbledon	0	2	
Dulwich Hamlet	0	2	
Tottenham Hotspur	0	2	
Haringey Borough	0	1	
London Seaward	0	1	
West Ham United	0	1	
