= Dante Garro =

Argentine footballer and manager

Personal information
- Full name: Luis Dante Garro
- Date of birth: January 1, 1951
- Place of birth: Argentina
- Date of death: November 13, 2008 (aged 57)
- Position: Midfielder

Senior career*
| Years | Team | Apps | (Gls) |
| 1967–1971 | Independiente Rivadavia | | |
| 1971– | Jorge Newbery de Junín | | |
| 1976 | Atlanta | | |
| 1977– | Deportivo Maipú | | |
| 1978– | Independiente Rivadavia | | |

Managerial career
- Godoy Cruz Antonio Tomba
- * Club domestic league appearances and goals

Dante Garro (†, Mendoza 13 November 2008) was an Argentine football player and manager.

== Club career ==
Garro was a midfielder who began his career with Independiente Rivadavia in the Primera División Argentina. He made his debut against Estudiantes de La Plata in 1967, and he played 11 seasons in Argentine football.

== Personal ==
Garro died 13 November 2008.
