= Jed Reilly =

Scottish footballer

Personal information
- Full name: Gerard Reilly
- Date of birth: 17 December 1951 (age 74)
- Position: Goalkeeper

Senior career*
Years	Team	Apps	(Gls)
?–1969	Broughty Athletic		
1969–1970	Dundee United	0	(0)
1970	Broughty Athletic		
1970–1971	Montrose	17	(0)
1971	Forfar Athletic	10	(0)
1971–1973	Inverness Thistle		
1973–1974	Brechin City	26	(0)
1974–1975	Dundee North End		
1975-1976	Inverness Thistle		
1976–1978	Dundee North End		
1978–1979	Brechin City	9	(0)
1979–?	Lochee United		
- * Club domestic league appearances and goals

Gerard Reilly is a Scottish former footballer who played as a goalkeeper.

Reilly grew up in St Marys, Dundee. He played junior football with Broughty Athletic before joining Dundee United in August 1969. He was immediately called up to play for the reserve team as cover for Hamish McAlpine, who had a long-term injury. On 15 September 1969, Reilly was named as a substitute for Dundee United's Inter-Cities Fairs Cup tie against Newcastle United. Aged 16 and having never even watched the first team play before, Reilly made his senior debut after 72 minutes of the match, replacing the injured Donald Mackay. This proved to be his only first team appearance for the club, and he was released in May 1970 following McAlpine's return to fitness.

After a brief spell back at Broughty Athletic, Reilly joined Montrose, making his Scottish Football League (SFL) debut against Clydebank on 12 September 1970. He then began the 1971–72 season with Forfar Athletic before joining Inverness Thistle, where he twice won the Highland League title. He then returned to the SFL with Brechin City and also played in junior football with Dundee North End before rejoining Inverness Thistle in 1975.

Reilly was released by Inverness Thistle in 1976 and returned to Dundee North End. He was named as substitute goalkeeper for the Scotland junior representative team to play a Republic of Ireland XI in September 1977. He had another spell with Brechin, as second-choice goalkeeper, during 1978–79 before being released at the season's end. He once again returned to junior football in Dundee, joining Lochee United.
