= Estate Agents Ombudsman =

The Estate Agents Ombudsman is an Ombudsman in the United Kingdom who handles complaints against estate agents.
