= Surrey County Football Association =

Regional football association in England

- Surrey FA logo
- Formation: 1877
- Purpose: Football Association
- Headquarters: Meadowbank, Dorking
- Website: www.surreyfa.com

The Surrey County Football Association was founded in 1877 and affiliated to The Football Association in 1882, at the same time as a County Senior Cup competition, the Surrey Senior Cup, was established. The organisation administers all levels of men's, women's and junior football in the county of Surrey, as well as those parts of Greater London in historic Surrey lying more than 12 miles from Charing Cross.

== County cups ==
These are the current county cups run by the Surrey FA. All finals are played at Surrey FA’s headquarters at Meadowbank Stadium.

- Saturday Senior Cup
- Saturday Premier Cup
- Saturday Intermediate Cup
- Saturday Junior Cup
- Saturday Lower Junior Cup
- Sunday Senior Cup
- Sunday Premier Cup
- Sunday Intermediate Cup
- Sunday Junior Cup
- Sunday Lower Junior Cup
- Mid-week Cup
- Sunday Veterans Cup
- Women's Cup
- U18s Youth Floodlit Mid-week Cup
- U18s Youth Cup
- U16s Youth Cup
- U15s Youth Cup
- U14s Youth Cup
- U13s Youth Cup
- U12s Youth Cup
- U16s Girls Youth Cup
- U15s Girls Youth Cup
- U14s Girls Youth Cup
- U13s Girls Youth Cup
- U12s Girls Youth Cup

The Surrey FA also jointly administers the Capital Women's Cups alongside the London FA, the Amateur Football Alliance and the Middlesex FA.

Recently, Surrey FA hosted a new Disability Cup Tournament.

== Surrey Charity Shield ==
The Surrey Charity Shield was introduced in 1895–96 in England as the main prize given by the Surrey County Football Association.
