= Middlesex County Football Association =

Regional football association in England

Middlesex Football Association
- Formation: 1883
- Purpose: Football Association
- Headquarters: Rectory Park, Northolt
- Website: www.middlesexfa.com

The Middlesex Football Association is an organisation that regulates and promotes football, aiming to increase the quantity and quality of participation in the historic area of Middlesex.

== History ==
The Middlesex F.A. was founded in 1883 by the Football Association. Nicholas Lane Jackson, who had helped found the Corinthians in 1882, organised the founding of the association, and became its first chairman. The association left the Football Association in 1907 to join the Amateur Football Association, but it soon returned. It moved to its current headquarters at Roxborough Road in Harrow in 1975. It did not employ any full-time staff until 1992.

== Geography ==
The Middlesex F.A. covers the historic extent of Middlesex and the entirety of the boroughs of Richmond upon Thames and Barnet. This area overlaps with the scope of the London Football Association, the Surrey County Football Association and Hertfordshire County Football Association. This means that many clubs are eligible for affiliation with more than one county football association, such as Ashford Town (Middlesex) who are affiliated to Middlesex and Surrey, and Potters Bar Town who are affiliated to Middlesex and Hertfordshire.

== Cups ==
The Middlesex F.A. organises the following cup competitions:

- MFA Senior Challenge Cup, more usually called the Middlesex Senior Cup
- MFA Senior Charity Cup, more usually called the Middlesex Senior Charity Cup or simply Middlesex Charity Cup
- MFA Ladies Senior Cup
- MFA Ladies Junior Cup
- MFA Premier Cup
- MFA Intermediate Cup
- MFA Junior Cup
- MFA Junior Trophy
- MFA Junior Trophy
- MFA Midweek Cup
- MFA Sunday Premier Cup
- MFA Sunday Intermediate Cup
- MFA Sunday Intermediate Cup
- MFA Sunday Junior Cup
- MFA Sunday Junior Cup
- MFA Sunday Junior Trophy
- MFA Sunday Junior Trophy
- MFA Senior Youth Cup
- MFA Youth Under 18 Cup
- MFA Youth Under 16 Cup
- MFA Youth Under 16 Girls Cup
- MFA Youth Under 15 Cup
- MFA Youth Under 15 Girls Cup
- MFA Youth Under 14 Cup
- MFA Youth Under 14 Cup
- MFA Youth Under 14 Girls Cup
- MFA Youth Under 13 Cup
- MFA Youth Under 13 Cup
- MFA Youth Under 13 Girls Cup
- MFA Youth Under 12 Cup
- MFA Youth Under 11 Cup

The Middlesex FA also jointly administers the Capital Women's Cups alongside the London FA, the Amateur Football Alliance and the Middlesex FA.
