= Leicestershire and Rutland County Football Association =

Area sporting organization with 19th century origins

- Leicestershire & Rutland County FA logo
- Abbreviation: LRCFA
- Formation: 1886
- Purpose: Football association
- Headquarters: Holmes Park
- Location: Whetstone, Leicester
- Coordinates: 52.560699°N 1.176274°W
- Chief Executive Officer: Joe Dunmore
- Website: www.leicestershirefa.com

The Leicestershire and Rutland County Football Association, also simply known as the Leicestershire & Rutland CFA, Leicestershire FA or LRCFA, is the governing body of football in the counties of Leicestershire and Rutland.

== Affiliated Leagues ==
=== Men's Saturday Leagues ===
- Leicestershire Senior League
- Leicestershire Church Football League
- Leicestershire Football Combination
- Leicester & District Football League
- Leicester City Football League
- North Leicestershire Football League

=== Men's Sunday Leagues ===
- Alliance Football League
- Charnwood Sunday Football League
- Hinckley & District Football League
- Leicester Sunday Football League
- Melton & District Sunday Football League

=== Women's Leagues ===
- Leicestershire Senior County Women's Football League
